= Members of the 14th Riigikogu =

The seat plan of Riigikogu after the 2019 parliamentary elections.

This is a list of the members of the 14th Riigikogu, the unicameral parliament of Estonia, following the 2019 election.

== Election results ==
Party	Votes	%	Seats	±
Estonian Reform Party	162,364	28.9	34	+4
Estonian Centre Party	129,617	23.1	26	−1
Conservative People's Party	99,672	17.8	19	+12
Pro Patria	64,219	11.4	12	−2
Social Democratic Party	55,168	9.8	10	−5
Estonia 200	24,447	4.4	0	New
Estonian Greens	10,226	1.8	0	0
Richness of Life	6,858	1.2	0	New
Estonian Free Party	6,460	1.2	0	−8
Estonian United Left	510	0.1	0	0
Independent candidates	1,590	0.3	0	0
Invalid/blank votes	3,897	–	–	–
Total	565,028	100	101	0
Registered voters/turnout	887,419	63.7	–	–
Source: Valimised

== Lists ==
=== By party ===
==== Estonian Reform Party (34) ====
Name	Constituency
Arto Aas	Haabersti, Põhja-Tallinn and Kristiine
Annely Akkermann	Pärnu
Yoko Alender	Järva and Viljandi
Jüri Jaanson	Pärnu
Kaja Kallas	Harju and Rapla
Siim Kallas	Kesklinn, Lasnamäe and Pirita
Liina Kersna	Võru, Valga and Põlva
Johannes Kert	Mustamäe and Nõmme
Signe Kivi	Tartu
Toomas Kivimägi	Pärnu
Urmas Klaas	Tartu
Heiki Kranich	Hiiu, Lääne and Saare
Eerik-Niiles Kross	Ida-Viru
Urmas Kruuse	Jõgeva and Tartu
Ants Laaneots	Tartu
Kalle Laanet	Hiiu, Lääne and Saare
Maris Lauri	Mustamäe and Nõmme
Jürgen Ligi	Järva and Viljandi
Kristen Michal	Haabersti, Põhja-Tallinn and Kristiine
Marko Mihkelson	Harju and Rapla
Madis Milling	Harju and Rapla
Urmas Paet	Mustamäe and Nõmme
Kalle Palling	Harju and Rapla
Keit Pentus-Rosimannus	Kesklinn, Lasnamäe and Pirita
Hanno Pevkur	Võru, Valga and Põlva
Heidy Purga	Haabersti, Põhja-Tallinn and Kristiine
Valdo Randpere	Jõgeva and Tartu
Taavi Rõivas	Lääne-Viru
Andrus Seeme	Võru, Valga and Põlva
Kristina Šmigun-Vähi	Kesklinn, Lasnamäe and Pirita
Andres Sutt	Kesklinn, Lasnamäe and Pirita
Aivar Sõerd	Harju and Rapla
Urve Tiidus	Hiiu, Lääne and Saare
Vilja Toomast	Mustamäe and Nõmme

==== Estonian Centre Party (26) ====
Name	Constituency
Jaak Aab	Järva and Viljandi
Taavi Aas	Mustamäe and Nõmme
Vladimir Arhipov	Harju and Rapla
Vadim Belobrovtsev (relinquished)	Haabersti, Põhja-Tallinn and Kristiine
Enn Eesmaa	Hiiu, Lääne and Saare
Maria Jufereva-Skuratovski	Kesklinn, Lasnamäe and Pirita
Marek Jürgenson	Haabersti, Põhja-Tallinn and Kristiine
Raimond Kaljulaid	Haabersti, Põhja-Tallinn and Kristiine
Kalev Kallo	Haabersti, Põhja-Tallinn and Kristiine
Jaanus Karilaid	Hiiu, Lääne and Saare
Mihhail Korb	Kesklinn, Lasnamäe and Pirita
Siret Kotka-Repinski	Lääne-Viru
Mihhail Kõlvart	Kesklinn, Lasnamäe and Pirita
Lauri Laats (relinquished)	Mustamäe and Nõmme
Aadu Must	Tartu
Anneli Ott	Võru, Valga and Põlva
Jüri Ratas	Harju and Rapla
Martin Repinski	Ida-Viru
Mailis Reps	Kesklinn, Lasnamäe and Pirita
Kersti Sarapuu	Järva and Viljandi
Kadri Simson	Pärnu
Mihhail Stalnuhhin	Ida-Viru
Vladimir Svet (relinquished)	Kesklinn, Lasnamäe and Pirita
Tarmo Tamm	Võru, Valga and Põlva
Yana Toom	Ida-Viru
Marika Tuus-Laul	Jõgeva and Tartu

==== Conservative People's Party (19) ====
Name	Constituency
Merry Aart	Võru, Valga and Põlva
Riho Breivel	Ida-Viru
Peeter Ernits	Jõgeva and Tartu
Helle-Moonika Helme	Hiiu, Lääne and Saare
Mart Helme	Pärnu
Martin Helme	Mustamäe and Nõmme
Ruuben Kaalep	Tartu
Uno Kaskpeit	Võru, Valga and Põlva
Kert Kingo	Jõgeva and Tartu
Rene Kokk	Harju and Rapla
Leo Kunnas	Kesklinn, Lasnamäe and Pirita
Alar Laneman	Pärnu
Siim Pohlak	Harju and Rapla
Anti Poolamets	Lääne-Viru
Paul Puustusmaa	Harju and Rapla
Henn Põlluaas	Harju and Rapla
Urmas Reitelmann	Haabersti, Põhja-Tallinn and Kristiine
Jaak Madison	Järva and Viljandi
Jaak Valge	Tartu

==== Pro Patria (12) ====
Name	Constituency
Aivar Kokk	Jõgeva and Tartu
Tarmo Kruusimäe	Kesklinn, Lasnamäe and Pirita
Viktoria Ladõnskaja-Kubits	Kesklinn, Lasnamäe and Pirita
Jüri Luik	Harju and Rapla
Tõnis Lukas	Tartu
Andres Metsoja	Pärnu
Urmas Reinsalu	Mustamäe and Nõmme
Helir-Valdor Seeder	Järva and Viljandi
Üllar Saaremäe	Lääne-Viru
Sven Sester	Haabersti, Põhja-Tallinn and Kristiine
Priit Sibul	Võru, Valga and Põlva
Raivo Tamm	Jõgeva and Tartu

==== Social Democratic Party (10) ====
Name	Constituency
Marina Kaljurand	Harju and Rapla
Kalvi Kõva	Võru, Valga and Põlva
Helmen Kütt	Järva and Viljandi
Sven Mikser	Haabersti, Põhja-Tallinn and Kristiine
Jevgeni Ossinovski	Kesklinn, Lasnamäe and Pirita
Ivari Padar	Võru, Valga and Põlva
Heljo Pikhof	Tartu
Katri Raik	Ida-Viru
Indrek Saar	Lääne-Viru
Riina Sikkut	Haabersti, Põhja-Tallinn and Kristiine

=== By votes ===
	Name	Votes	Party
1.	Kaja Kallas	20,072	Ref
2.	Mihhail Kõlvart	17,150	Kesk
3.	Jüri Ratas	9,702	Kesk
4.	Mart Helme	9,170	EKRE
5.	Siim Kallas	8,733	Ref
6.	Urmas Paet	8,584	Ref
7.	Henn Põlluaas	7,390	EKRE
8.	Raimond Kaljulaid	7,303	Kesk
9.	Kristen Michal	6,347	Ref
10.	Yana Toom	6,195	Kesk
Source: VVK

== Midterm replacements ==
- Vladimir Arhipov (Centre) relinquished his seat in advance for Kaido Höövelson.
- Vadim Belobrovtsev (Centre) relinquished his seat in advance for Viktor Vassiljev.
- Urmas Klaas (Reform) relinquished his seat in advance for Hele Everaus.
- Mihhail Kõlvart (Centre) relinquished his seat in advance for Erki Savisaar.
- Lauri Laats (Centre) relinquished his seat in advance for Igor Kravtšenko.
- Tõnis Lukas (Pro Patria) relinquished his seat in advance for Mihhail Lotman.
- Urmas Paet (Reform) relinquished his seat in advance for Erkki Keldo.
- Vladimir Svet (Centre) relinquished his seat in advance for Tõnis Mölder.
- Yana Toom (Centre) relinquished her seat in advance for Dmitri Dmitrijev.
