= Riigikogu electoral district no. 1 =

Electoral district of Estonia

Electoral district no. 1
- Valimisringkond nr 1
- Electoral District for the Riigikogu
- Location of Electoral district no. 1 within Estonia
- Municipality: Tallinn
- County: Harju
- Population: 169,247 (2020)
- Electorate: 85,469 (2019)

Current Electoral District
- Created: 1995
- Seats: List: 10 (2019–present); 9 (2011–2019); 8 (1995–2011)
- Member of the Riigikogu: List: Urmas Espenberg (EKRE); Marek Jürgenson (K); Jaak Juske (SDE); Raimond Kaljulaid (SDE); Andrei Korobeinik (K); Tarmo Kruusimäe (I); Natalia Malleus (K); Kristen Michal (RE); Heidy Purga (RE); Urmas Reitelmann (EKRE); Signe Riisalo (RE); Riina Sikkut (SDE); Viktor Vassiljev (K)

Electoral district no. 1 (Estonian: Valimisringkond nr 1) is one of the 12 multi-member electoral districts of the Riigikogu, the national legislature of Estonia. The electoral district was established in 1995 following the re-organisation of the electoral districts in Tallinn. It is conterminous with the districts of Haabersti, Kristiine and Põhja-Tallinn in Tallinn. The district currently elects 10 of the 101 members of the Riigikogu using the open party-list proportional representation electoral system. At the 2019 parliamentary election it had 85,469 registered electors.

== Electoral system ==
Electoral district no. 1 currently elects 10 of the 101 members of the Riigikogu using the open party-list proportional representation electoral system. The allocation of seats is carried out in three stages. In the first stage, any individual candidate, regardless of whether they are a party or independent candidate, who receives more votes than the district's simple quota (Hare quota: valid votes in district/number of seats allocated to district) is elected via a personal mandate. In the second stage, district mandates are allocated to parties by dividing their district votes by the district's simple quota. Only parties that reach the 5% national threshold compete for district mandates and any personal mandates won by the party are subtracted from the party's district mandates. Prior to 2003 if a party's surplus/remainder votes was equal to or greater than 75% of the district's simple quota it received one additional district mandate. Any unallocated district seats are added to a national pool of compensatory seats. In the final stage, compensatory mandates are calculated based on the national vote and using a modified D'Hondt method. Only parties that reach the 5% national threshold compete for compensatory seats and any personal and district mandates won by the party are subtracted from the party's compensatory mandates. Though calculated nationally, compensatory mandates are allocated at the district level.

=== Seats ===
Seats allocated to electoral district no. 1 by the National Electoral Committee of Estonia at each election was as follows:

- 2023 - 10
- 2019 - 10
- 2015 - 9
- 2011 - 9
- 2007 - 8
- 2003 - 8
- 1999 - 8
- 1995 - 8

== Election results ==
=== Summary ===
Election	Left EÜVP/EVP/ESDTP/Õ/V			Constitution K/EÜRP/MKOE			Social Democrats SDE/RM/M			Greens EER/NJ/R			Centre K/R			Estonia 200 EE200			Reform RE			Isamaa I/IRL/I/I\ERSP/I			Conservative People's EKRE/ERL/EME/KMÜ		
Election	Votes	%	Seats	Votes	%	Seats	Votes	%	Seats	Votes	%	Seats	Votes	%	Seats	Votes	%	Seats	Votes	%	Seats	Votes	%	Seats	Votes	%	Seats
2023	2,016	3.27%	0				6,165	10.00%	1	665	1.08%	0	12,870	20.89%	2	9,638	15.64%	1	19,346	31.40%	3	3,471	5.56%	0	5,956	9.67%	1
2019	70	0.12%	0				5,683	10.11%	1	1,812	3.22%	0	16,950	30.16%	3	2,635	4.69%	0	16,299	29.01%	3	4,950	8.81%	1	6,361	11.32%	1
2015	39	0.07%	0				7,718	13.70%	1	539	0.96%	0	18,916	33.58%	3				14,149	25.11%	2	7,193	12.77%	1	2,986	5.30%	0
2011							7,210	13.68%	1	1,128	2.14%	0	17,072	32.38%	3				12,396	23.51%	2	10,984	20.83%	2	324	0.61%	0
2007	82	0.17%	0	716	1.50%	0	4,498	9.40%	1	3,421	7.15%	0	15,949	33.34%	2				11,871	24.81%	2	9,363	19.57%	1	573	1.20%	0
2003	387	0.94%	0	1,109	2.71%	0	2,251	5.50%	0				12,235	29.87%	2				7,787	19.01%	1	2,765	6.75%	0	1,376	3.36%	0
1999				2,589	6.69%	0	5,192	13.42%	1				6,927	17.90%	1				7,003	18.10%	1	8,778	22.69%	1	637	1.65%	0
1995	841	1.98%	0	5,047	11.87%	0	1,704	4.01%	0	328	0.77%	0	6,851	16.11%	1				10,858	25.54%	1	3,172	7.46%	0	9,335	21.96%	1

(Excludes compensatory seats)

=== Detailed ===
Party has received at least 5% of the vote nationally and is entitled to compete for district seats.

==== 2023 ====
Results of the 2023 parliamentary election held on 5 March 2023:

Party		Votes per district					Total Votes	%	Seats			
Party		Haaber- sti	Kris- tiine	Põhja- Tallinn	Expat- riates	Elec- tronic	Total Votes	%	Per.	Dis.	Com.	Tot.
Estonian Reform Party	REF	1,492	1,643	1,436	52	14,241	19,346	31.40%	1	2	1	4
Estonian Centre Party	KESK	3,741	1,662	3,332	12	3,632	12,870	20.89%	0	2	2	4
Estonia 200	EE200	715	873	873	20	6,935	9,638	15.64%	0	1	1	2
Social Democratic Party	SDE	437	558	804	19	4,112	6,165	10.00%	0	1	0	1
Conservative People's Party of Estonia	EKRE	1,232	1,202	1,445	52	1,732	5,956	9.67%	0	1	0	1
Isamaa	IE	442	547	438	10	1,893	3,471	5.63%	0	0	1	1
Estonian United Left Party	EÜVP	671	230	674	5	363	2,016	3.27%	0	0	0	0
Parempoolsed		116	167	187	3	896	1,404	2.28%	0	0	0	0
Estonian Greens	EER	57	73	99	2	415	665	1.08%	0	0	0	0
Indrek Nicholas Nurmberg (Independent)		15	17	21	1	23	79	0.01%	0	0	0	0
Valid votes		8,918	6,972	9,309	176	34,242	61,610	100.00%	1	7	5	13
Rejected votes		386	85	124	5	0	600	0.03%				
Total polled		9,304	7,057	9,433	179	34,242	62,010	64.82%				
Registered electors		29,987	22,078	34,242	9,353		95,660					

The following candidates were elected:

- Personal mandates - Kristen Michal (REF), 9,214 votes.
- District mandates - Vadim Belobrovtsev (KESK), 3,231 votes; Raimond Kaljulaid (SDE), 1,819 votes; Anastassia Kovalenko-Kõlvart (KESK), 2,806 votes; Johanna-Maria Lehtme (EE200), 5,251 votes; Pärtel-Peeter Pere (REF), 1,474 votes; Signe Riisalo (REF), 4,523 votes and Varro Vooglaid (EKRE), 2,509 votes.
- Compensatory mandates - Andre Hanimägi (KESK), 466 votes; Tanel Kiik (KESK), 1,610 votes; Riina Solman (IE), 1,773 votes; Hendrik Johannes Terras (E200), 1,610 votes; Kristo Enn Vaga (REF), 591 votes.

==== 2019 ====
Results of the 2019 parliamentary election held on 3 March 2019:

Party		Votes per district					Total Votes	%	Seats			
Party		Haaber- sti	Kris- tiine	Põhja- Tallinn	Expat- riates	Elec- tronic	Total Votes	%	Per.	Dis.	Com.	Tot.
Estonian Centre Party	K	5,069	2,323	5,942	33	3,583	16,950	30.16%	1	2	1	4
Estonian Reform Party	RE	1,587	1,616	1,733	40	11,323	16,299	29.01%	1	2	0	3
Conservative People's Party of Estonia	EKRE	1,165	1,267	1,483	69	2,377	6,361	11.32%	0	1	0	1
Social Democratic Party	SDE	565	547	909	30	3,632	5,683	10.11%	0	1	1	2
Isamaa	I	666	757	778	14	2,735	4,950	8.81%	0	1	0	1
Estonia 200		250	259	381	5	1,740	2,635	4.69%	0	0	0	0
Estonian Greens	EER	172	186	360	10	1,084	1,812	3.22%	0	0	0	0
Estonian Biodiversity Party		63	77	133	3	363	639	1.14%	0	0	0	0
Estonian Free Party	EVA	43	72	96	7	246	464	0.83%	0	0	0	0
Magnus Saar (Independent)		33	32	61	4	86	216	0.38%	0	0	0	0
Hannes Veskimäe (Independent)		16	14	19	0	63	112	0.20%	0	0	0	0
Estonian United Left Party	EÜVP	17	10	22	0	21	70	0.12%	0	0	0	0
Valid votes		9,646	7,160	11,917	215	27,253	56,191	100.00%	2	7	2	11
Rejected votes		78	339	116	5	0	538	0.95%				
Total polled		9,724	7,499	12,033	220	27,253	56,729	66.37%				
Registered electors		28,262	22,289	34,228	690		85,469					

The following candidates were elected:

- Personal mandates - Raimond Kaljulaid (K), 7,303 votes; and Kristen Michal (RE), 6,347 votes.
- District mandates - Arto Aas (RE), 2,339 votes; Vadim Belobrovtsev (Note: Vadim Belobrovtsev declined to take up a seat in the Riigikogu.) (K), 1,969 votes; Marek Jürgenson (K), 1,813 votes; Tarmo Kruusimäe (I), 1,811 votes; Sven Mikser (SDE), 1,693 votes; Heidy Purga (RE), 4,763 votes; and Urmas Reitelmann (EKRE), 2,585 votes.
- Compensatory mandates - Kalev Kallo (K), 289 votes; and Riina Sikkut (SDE), 1,610 votes.

==== 2015 ====
Results of the 2015 parliamentary election held on 1 March 2015:

Party		Votes per district					Total Votes	%	Seats			
Party		Haaber- sti	Kris- tiine	Põhja- Tallinn	Expat- riates	Elec- tronic	Total Votes	%	Per.	Dis.	Com.	Tot.
Estonian Centre Party	K	6,435	3,126	7,617	30	1,708	18,916	33.58%	1	2	2	5
Estonian Reform Party	RE	2,182	2,335	2,279	40	7,313	14,149	25.11%	0	2	0	2
Social Democratic Party	SDE	1,215	1,250	1,733	24	3,496	7,718	13.70%	0	1	0	1
Pro Patria and Res Publica Union	IRL	1,251	1,292	1,336	35	3,279	7,193	12.77%	0	1	0	1
Estonian Free Party	EVA	651	747	945	13	2,201	4,557	8.09%	0	0	1	1
Conservative People's Party of Estonia	EKRE	615	696	764	11	900	2,986	5.30%	0	0	0	0
Estonian Greens	EER	69	100	141	3	226	539	0.96%	0	0	0	0
Estonian Independence Party	EIP	23	31	30	0	23	107	0.19%	0	0	0	0
Party of People's Unity	RÜE	16	18	23	2	30	89	0.16%	0	0	0	0
Svetlana Ivnitskaja (Independent)		12	8	18	0	8	46	0.08%	0	0	0	0
Estonian United Left Party	EÜVP	15	8	13	0	3	39	0.07%	0	0	0	0
Valid votes		12,484	9,611	14,899	158	19,187	56,339	100.00%	1	6	3	10
Rejected votes		100	82	126	3	0	311	0.55%				
Total polled		12,584	9,693	15,025	161	19,187	56,650	68.91%				
Registered electors		26,913	21,786	33,345	161		82,205					

The following candidates were elected:

- Personal mandates - Mihhail Kõlvart (K), 10,996 votes.
- District mandates - Kristen Michal (RE), 4,766 votes; Eiki Nestor (SDE), 3,744 votes; Heidy Purga (RE), 3,283 votes; Märt Sults (K), 1,285 votes; Ken-Marti Vaher (IRL), 2,313 votes; and Viktor Vassiljev (K), 1,862 votes.
- Compensatory mandates - Kalev Kallo (K), 575 votes; Külliki Kübarsepp (EVA), 1,032 votes; and Lauri Laasi (K), 407 votes.

==== 2011 ====
Results of the 2011 parliamentary election held on 6 March 2011:

Party		Votes per district					Total Votes	%	Seats			
Party		Haaber- sti	Kris- tiine	Põhja- Tallinn	Expat- riates	Elec- tronic	Total Votes	%	Per.	Dis.	Com.	Tot.
Estonian Centre Party	K	5,336	2,835	6,967	12	1,922	17,072	32.38%	1	2	1	4
Estonian Reform Party	RE	2,431	2,398	2,404	38	5,125	12,396	23.51%	1	1	1	3
Pro Patria and Res Publica Union	IRL	2,104	2,332	2,430	69	4,049	10,984	20.83%	0	2	0	2
Social Democratic Party	SDE	1,403	1,378	1,899	35	2,495	7,210	13.68%	0	1	0	1
Mart Helme (Independent)		499	589	654	15	710	2,467	4.68%	0	0	0	0
Estonian Greens	EER	204	208	318	9	389	1,128	2.14%	0	0	0	0
Russian Party in Estonia	VEE	254	97	190	2	140	683	1.30%	0	0	0	0
People's Union of Estonia	ERL	75	73	90	1	85	324	0.61%	0	0	0	0
Party of Estonian Christian Democrats	EKD	43	68	90	0	48	249	0.47%	0	0	0	0
Estonian Independence Party	EIP	36	26	38	1	22	123	0.23%	0	0	0	0
Andres Ergma (Independent)		21	10	22	0	17	70	0.13%	0	0	0	0
Svetlana Ivnitskaja (Independent)		5	4	5	0	2	16	0.03%	0	0	0	0
Valid votes		12,411	10,018	15,107	182	15,004	52,722	100.00%	2	6	2	10
Rejected votes		133	108	159	14	0	414	0.78%				
Total polled		12,544	10,126	15,266	196	15,004	53,136	69.74%				
Registered electors		25,109	20,170	30,714	196		76,189					

The following candidates were elected:

- Personal mandates - Deniss Boroditš (K), 5,896 votes; and Taavi Rõivas (RE), 6,710 votes.
- District mandates - Andres Herkel (IRL), 1,765 votes; Tarmo Leinatamm (RE), 1,562 votes; Eiki Nestor (SDE), 4,003 votes; Yana Toom (K), 4,510 votes; Ken-Marti Vaher (IRL), 5,412 votes; and Viktor Vassiljev (K), 1,914 votes.
- Compensatory mandates - Remo Holsmer (RE), 694 votes; and Kalev Kallo (K), 308 votes.

==== 2007 ====
Results of the 2007 parliamentary election held on 4 March 2007:

Party		Votes per district					Total Votes	%	Seats			
Party		Haaber- sti	Kris- tiine	Põhja- Tallinn	Expat- riates	Elec- tronic	Total Votes	%	Per.	Dis.	Com.	Tot.
Estonian Centre Party	K	5,282	3,075	7,200	11	381	15,949	33.34%	1	1	1	3
Estonian Reform Party	RE	3,901	3,536	3,262	21	1,151	11,871	24.81%	1	1	0	2
Pro Patria and Res Publica Union	IRL	2,645	2,877	2,769	86	986	9,363	19.57%	0	1	2	3
Social Democratic Party	SDE	1,159	1,304	1,503	53	479	4,498	9.40%	0	1	0	1
Estonian Greens	EER	864	975	1,193	12	377	3,421	7.15%	0	0	1	1
Party of Estonian Christian Democrats	EKD	308	306	408	12	46	1,080	2.26%	0	0	0	0
Constitution Party	K	293	109	298	1	15	716	1.50%	0	0	0	0
People's Union of Estonia	ERL	175	148	203	0	47	573	1.20%	0	0	0	0
Estonian Independence Party	EIP	35	26	53	1	16	131	0.27%	0	0	0	0
Russian Party in Estonia	VEE	43	19	52	1	5	120	0.25%	0	0	0	0
Estonian Left Party	EVP	26	27	26	0	3	82	0.17%	0	0	0	0
Svetlana Ivnitskaja (Independent)		12	3	10	1	1	27	0.06%	0	0	0	0
Niina-Inessa Stepanova (Independent)		3	6	1	0	1	11	0.02%	0	0	0	0
Valid votes		14,746	12,411	16,978	199	3,508	47,842	100.00%	2	4	4	10
Rejected votes		115	85	133	7	0	340	0.71%				
Total polled		14,861	12,496	17,111	206	3,508	48,182	66.26%				
Registered electors		23,269	19,739	29,500	206		72,714					

The following candidates were elected:

- Personal mandates - Rein Lang (RE), 7,025 votes; and Vilja Savisaar (K), 8,531 votes.
- District mandates - Jaak Aaviksoo (IRL), 4,241 votes; Eiki Nestor (SDE), 2,615 votes; Taavi Rõivas (RE), 1,701 votes; and Vladimir Velman (K), 3,342 votes.
- Compensatory mandates - Andres Herkel (IRL), 1,244 votes; Lauri Laasi (K), 705 votes; Maret Merisaar (EER), 443 votes; and Ken-Marti Vaher (IRL), 2,313 votes.

==== 2003 ====
Results of the 2003 parliamentary election held on 2 March 2003:

Party		Votes per district				Total Votes	%	Seats			
Party		Haaber- sti	Kris- tiine	Põhja- Tallinn	Expat- riates	Total Votes	%	Per.	Dis.	Com.	Tot.
Estonian Centre Party	K	3,341	3,063	5,815	16	12,235	29.87%	1	1	1	3
Union for the Republic–Res Publica	ÜVE-RP	4,041	4,079	4,039	47	12,206	29.80%	1	1	2	4
Estonian Reform Party	RE	3,176	2,413	2,184	14	7,787	19.01%	0	1	0	1
Pro Patria Union Party	I	842	895	961	67	2,765	6.75%	0	0	1	1
Moderate People's Party	RM	665	642	923	21	2,251	5.50%	0	0	1	1
People's Union of Estonia	ERL	456	445	472	3	1,376	3.36%	0	0	0	0
Estonian United People's Party	EÜRP	469	196	440	4	1,109	2.71%	0	0	0	0
Estonian Christian People's Party	EKRP	131	133	158	2	424	1.04%	0	0	0	0
Estonian Social Democratic Labour Party	ESDTP	116	97	174	0	387	0.94%	0	0	0	0
Estonian Independence Party	EIP	47	86	78	0	211	0.52%	0	0	0	0
Russian Party in Estonia	VEE	61	29	61	1	152	0.37%	0	0	0	0
Enn Oja (Independent)		21	17	21	0	59	0.14%	0	0	0	0
Valid votes		13,366	12,095	15,326	175	40,962	100.00%	2	3	5	10
Rejected votes		122	136	175	4	437	1.06%				
Total polled		13,488	12,231	15,501	179	41,399	62.51%				
Registered electors		20,469	18,912	26,665	179	66,225					
Turnout		65.89%	64.67%	58.13%	100.00%	62.51%					

The following candidates were elected:

- Personal mandates - Juhan Parts (ÜVE-RP), 6,890 votes; and Vilja Savisaar (K), 5,919 votes.
- District mandates - Elle Kull (ÜVE-RP), 2,217 votes; Rein Lang (RE), 4,283 votes; and Vladimir Velman (K), 2,143 votes.
- Compensatory mandates - Andres Herkel (I), 1,238 votes; Eiki Nestor (RM), 1,233 votes; Evelyn Sepp (K), 292 votes; Avo Üprus (ÜVE-RP), 372 votes; and Ken-Marti Vaher (ÜVE-RP), 1,379 votes.

==== 1999 ====
Results of the 1999 parliamentary election held on 7 March 1999:

Party		Votes per district				Total Votes	%	Seats			
Party		Haaber- sti	Kris- tiine	Põhja- Tallinn	Expat- riates	Total Votes	%	Per.	Dis.	Com.	Tot.
Pro Patria Union	I	2,839	2,768	2,929	242	8,778	22.69%	1	0	1	2
Estonian Reform Party	RE	2,393	2,365	2,215	30	7,003	18.10%	0	1	1	2
Estonian Centre Party	K	2,239	1,957	2,729	2	6,927	17.90%	0	1	1	2
Moderate	M	1,775	1,578	1,766	73	5,192	13.42%	0	1	1	2
Russian Party in Estonia	VEE	1,093	485	1,415	2	2,995	7.74%	0	0	0	0
Estonian United People's Party	EÜRP	996	450	1,142	1	2,589	6.69%	0	0	2	2
Estonian Coalition Party	KE	488	497	922	7	1,914	4.95%	0	0	1	1
Estonian Christian People's Party	EKRP	342	346	399	24	1,111	2.87%	0	0	0	0
Estonian Blue Party	ESE	170	235	257	9	671	1.73%	0	0	0	0
Estonian Country People's Party	EME	181	229	225	2	637	1.65%	0	0	0	0
Dimitri Klenski (Independent)		215	134	205	0	554	1.43%	0	0	0	0
Progress Party		43	57	102	0	202	0.52%	0	0	0	0
Farmers' Assembly		25	45	46	5	121	0.31%	0	0	0	0
Valid votes		12,799	11,146	14,352	397	38,694	100.00%	1	3	7	11
Rejected votes		172	152	269	3	596	1.52%				
Total polled		12,971	11,298	14,621	400	39,290	59.28%				
Registered electors		20,815	18,024	27,045	400	66,284					
Turnout		62.32%	62.68%	54.06%	100.00%	59.28%					

The following candidates were elected:

- Personal mandates - Jüri Mõis (I), 6,739 votes.
- District mandates - Arvo Haug (K), 2,234 votes; Valve Kirsipuu (RE), 3,556 votes; Eiki Nestor (M), 1,956 votes.
- Compensatory mandates - Ivi Eenmaa (KE), 580 votes; Vootele Hansen (M), 1,209 votes; Andres Herkel (I), 737 votes; Kalev Kallo (K), 523 votes; Tiit Toomsalu (EÜRP), 134 votes; Rein Voog (RE), 527 votes; and Valentina Võssotskaja (EÜRP), 64 votes.

==== 1995 ====
Results of the 1995 parliamentary election held on 5 March 1995:

Party		Votes per district				Total Votes	%	Seats			
Party		Haaber- sti	Kris- tiine	Põhja- Tallinn	Expat- riates	Total Votes	%	Per.	Dis.	Com.	Tot.
Estonian Reform Party	RE	3,782	3,354	3,577	145	10,858	25.54%	1	0	0	1
Coalition Party and Rural People's Association	KMÜ	2,915	2,789	3,572	59	9,335	21.96%	1	0	3	4
Estonian Centre Party	K	2,125	1,869	2,838	19	6,851	16.11%	0	1	1	2
Our Home is Estonia	MKOE	1,924	1,022	2,096	5	5,047	11.87%	0	0	0	0
Pro Patria and ERSP Union	I\ERSP	828	816	1,084	444	3,172	7.46%	0	0	1	1
Moderate	M	527	530	619	28	1,704	4.01%	0	0	1	1
Better Estonia/Estonian Citizen	PE/EK	414	422	546	7	1,389	3.27%	0	0	0	0
The Right Wingers	P	418	363	393	21	1,195	2.81%	0	0	1	1
Estonian Future Party	TEE	256	255	329	7	847	1.99%	0	0	0	0
Justice	Õ	252	200	388	1	841	1.98%	0	0	0	0
Estonian National Federation	ERKL	102	106	128	3	339	0.80%	0	0	0	0
Fourth Force	NJ	121	92	108	7	328	0.77%	0	0	0	0
Estonian Farmers' Party	ETRE	64	99	65	1	229	0.54%	0	0	0	0
Blue Party	SE	68	42	70	2	182	0.43%	0	0	0	0
Lembit Annus (Independent)		23	16	72	0	111	0.26%	0	0	0	0
Forest Party		16	19	27	0	62	0.15%	0	0	0	0
Estonian Democratic Union	EDL	6	6	12	0	24	0.06%	0	0	0	0
Valid votes		13,841	12,000	15,924	749	42,514	100.00%	2	1	7	10
Rejected votes		105	87	144	0	336	0.78%				
Total polled		13,946	12,087	16,068	749	42,850	72.64%				
Registered electors		18,564	16,635	23,045	749	58,993					
Turnout		75.12%	72.66%	69.72%	100.00%	72.64%					

The following candidates were elected:

- Personal mandates - Siim Kallas (RE), 10,459 votes; and Andrus Öövel (KMÜ), 5,839 votes.
- District mandates - Arvo Haug (K), 2,561 votes.
- Compensatory mandates - Jüri Adams (I\ERSP), 1,626 votes; Karin Jaani (P), 670 votes; Krista Kilvet (K), 760 votes; Märt Kubo (KMÜ), 142 votes; Tõnu-Reid Kukk (KMÜ), 98 votes; Eiki Nestor (M), 1,250 votes; and Eino Tamm (KMÜ), 269 votes.
