= Urmas =

Male given name

- Gender: Male
- Language: Estonian

Origin
- Region of origin: Estonia

Other names
- Related names: Urmo, Urmet

Urmas is an Estonian masculine given name. Notable people named Urmas include:

- Urmas Alender (1953–1994), singer
- Urmas Arumäe (born 1957), attorney, associate professor, former Minister of Justice
- Urmas Espenberg (born 1961), author, politician and publicist
- Urmas Hepner (born 1964), football player
- Urmas Kaldvee (born 1961), biathlete
- Urmas Kaljend (born 1964), football player
- Urmas Kibuspuu (1953–1985), actor
- Urmas Kirs (born 1966), football player and manager
- Urmas Klaas (born 1971), politician
- Urmas Kõljalg (born 1961), biologist, mycologist and university professor
- Urmas Kruuse (born 1965), politician
- Urmas Laht (born 1955), politician
- Urmas Lattikas (born 1960), composer and jazz pianist
- Urmas Eero Liiv (born 1966), film and television director
- Urmas Lõoke (born 1950), architect
- Urmas Muru (born 1961), architect and artist
- Urmas Nemvalts (born 1968), Estonian caricaturist, editorial cartoonist, comics artist, illustrator and children's writer
- Urmas Ott (1955–2008), television and radio journalist
- Urmas Paet (born 1974), politician
- Urmas Reinsalu (born 1975), politician
- Urmas Reitelmann (born 1958), radio and television personality, producer, journalist and politician
- Urmas Rooba (born 1978), football player
- Urmas Saaliste (born 1960), sport shooter
- Urmas Sisask (1960–2022), composer
- Urmas Sutrop (born 1956), linguist
- Urmas Tali (born 1970), volleyball player and coach
- Urmas Tartes (born 1963), biologist and photographer
- Urmas Vadi (born 1977), writer, journalist and theatre director
- Urmas Välbe (born 1966), cross-country skier
- Urmas Varblane (born 1961), economist and academic
- Urmas Viilma (born 1973), Estonian prelate, Archbishop of Tallinn, Primate of the Estonian Evangelical Lutheran Church
