= Sulev (given name) =

Male given name

- Gender: Male
- Language: Estonian
- Name day: 6 July

Origin
- Region of origin: Estonia

Sulev is an Estonian masculine given name.

People named Sulev include:

- Sulev Alajõe (born 1965), politician and lecturer
- Sulev Iva (born 1969), Võro identity activist
- Sulev Kannimäe (born 1955), Estonian politician
- Sulev Keedus (born 1957), film director
- Sulev Luik (1954–1997), actor
- Sulev Mäeltsemees (born 1947), social scientist and scholar
- Sulev Nõmmik (1931–1992), theatre and movie director, actor, humorist and comedian
- Sulev Oll (born 1964), journalist and poet
- Sulev Teppart (born 1960), actor
- Sulev Teinemaa (1947–2020), film journalist
- Sulev Vahtre (1926–2007), historian
- Sulev Valner (born 1965), journalist (:et)
- Sulev Vare (born 1962), politician
