= Toobal =

Family name

Origin
- Language: Estonian
- Region of origin: Estonia

Toobal is a surname of Estonian origin, and may refer to:

- Andres Toobal (born 1988), Estonian volleyball player
- Kert Toobal (born 1979), Estonian volleyball player
- Priit Toobal (born 1983), Estonian politician
