= 14th Riigikogu =

Parliament of Estonia 2019–2023

←	13th Riigikogu	15th Riigikogu	→
- Seat composition of the 14th Riigikogu

Overview
- Legislative body: Riigikogu
- Jurisdiction: Estonia
- Meeting place: Toompea Castle, Tallinn
- Term: 4 April 2019 – 3 April 2023
- Election: 3 March 2019
- Government: 2019-2021: Centre-EKRE-Isamaa; 2021-2022: Reform-Centre; 2022-2023: Reform-Isamaa-SDE
- Opposition: 2019-2021: Reform-SDE; 2021-2022: EKRE-Isamaa-SDE; 2022-2023: Centre-EKRE-Parempoolsed
- Website: riigikogu.ee
- Members: 101
- President: 2019-2021: Henn Põlluaas (EKRE); 2021-2023: Jüri Ratas (Centre)
- First Vice President: 2019-2021, 2022-: Helir-Valdor Seeder (Isamaa); 2021-2022: Hanno Pevkur (Reform)
- Party control: 2019-2021: Centre-EKRE-Isamaa majority 2021-2022: Reform-Centre majority 2022-2023: Reform-Isamaa-SDE majority

The 14th Riigikogu is the 14th legislature of the Estonian Parliament (Riigikogu). The legislature was elected after 2019 election.

== Election results ==
Party	Votes	%	Seats	±
Estonian Reform Party	162,364	28.9	34	+4
Estonian Centre Party	129,617	23.1	26	−1
Conservative People's Party	99,672	17.8	19	+12
Pro Patria	64,219	11.4	12	−2
Social Democratic Party	55,168	9.8	10	−5
Estonia 200	24,447	4.4	0	New
Estonian Greens	10,226	1.8	0	0
Estonian Biodiversity Party	6,858	1.2	0	New
Estonian Free Party	6,460	1.2	0	−8
Estonian United Left	510	0.1	0	0
Independent candidates	1,590	0.3	0	0
Invalid/blank votes	3,897	–	–	–
Total	565,028	100	101	0
Registered voters/turnout	887,419	63.7	–	–
Source: Valimised

== Officers ==
Speaker of the Riigikogu: Henn Põlluaas.

== List of members of the Riigikogu ==
Current members of the Estonian Parliament.
Constituency	Deputy	Faction	Birth year	Notes
Pärnu	Annely Akkermann	Reform	1972	
Järva and Viljandi	Yoko Alender	Reform	1979	
Kesklinn, Lasnamäe and Pirita	Ivi Eenmaa	Reform	1943	
Tartu	Hele Everaus	Reform	1953	
Pärnu	Jüri Jaanson	Reform	1965	
Jõgeva and Tartu	Toomas Järveoja	Reform	1961	
Kesklinn, Lasnamäe and Pirita	Siim Kallas	Reform	1948	
Järva and Viljandi	Sulev Kannimäe	Reform	1955	
Jõgeva and Tartu	Erkki Keldo	Reform	1990	
Võru, Valga and Põlva	Liina Kersna	Reform	1980	
Tartu	Signe Kivi	Reform	1957	
Pärnu	Toomas Kivimägi	Reform	1963	
Hiiu, Lääne and Saare	Heiki Kranich	Reform	1961	
Ida-Viru	Eerik-Niiles Kross	Reform	1967	
Tartu	Ants Laaneots	Reform	1948	
Hiiu, Lääne and Saare	Kalle Laanet	Reform	1965	
Mustamäe and Nõmme	Maris Lauri	Reform	1966	
Järva and Viljandi	Jürgen Ligi	Reform	1959	
Haabersti, Põhja-Tallinn and Kristiine	Kristen Michal	Reform	1975	
Harju and Rapla	Marko Mihkelson	Reform	1969	
Mustamäe and Nõmme	Õnne Pillak	Reform	1983	
Haabersti, Põhja-Tallinn and Kristiine	Heidy Purga	Reform	1975	
Lääne-Viru	Mati Raidma	Reform	1965	
Jõgeva and Tartu	Valdo Randpere	Reform	1958	
Võru, Valga and Põlva	Andrus Seeme	Reform	1969	
Harju and Rapla	Timo Suslov	Reform	1981	
Tartu	Margit Sutrop	Reform	1963	
Kesklinn, Lasnamäe and Pirita	Andres Sutt	Reform	1967	
Harju and Rapla	Aivar Sõerd	Reform	1964	
Kesklinn, Lasnamäe and Pirita	Kristina Šmigun-Vähi	Reform	1977	
Hiiu, Lääne and Saare	Urve Tiidus	Reform	1954	
Mustamäe and Nõmme	Vilja Toomast	Reform	1962	
Lääne-Viru	Marko Torm	Reform	1980	
Harju and Rapla	Mart Võrklaev	Reform	1984	
Järva and Viljandi	Jaak Aab	Centre	1960	
Mustamäe and Nõmme	Taavi Aas	Centre	1966	
Ida-Viru	Dmitri Dmitrijev	Centre	1982	
Hiiu, Lääne and Saare	Enn Eesmaa	Centre	1946	
Harju and Rapla	Kaido Höövelson	Centre	1984	
Kesklinn, Lasnamäe and Pirita	Maria Jufereva-Skuratovski	Centre	1979	
Haabersti, Põhja-Tallinn and Kristiine	Marek Jürgenson	Centre	1977	
Hiiu, Lääne and Saare	Jaanus Karilaid	Centre	1977	
Kesklinn, Lasnamäe and Pirita	Mihhail Korb	Centre	1980	
Lääne-Viru	Siret Kotka	Centre	1986	
Mustamäe and Nõmme	Igor Kravtšenko	Centre	1973	
Haabersti, Põhja-Tallinn and Kristiine	Natalia Malleus	Centre	1954	
Tartu	Aadu Must	Centre	1951	
Kesklinn, Lasnamäe and Pirita	Tõnis Mölder	Centre	1989	
Võru, Valga and Põlva	Anneli Ott	Centre	1976	
Harju and Rapla	Jüri Ratas	Centre	1978	
Kesklinn, Lasnamäe and Pirita	Mailis Reps	Centre	1975	
Järva and Viljandi	Kersti Sarapuu	Centre	1954	
Kesklinn, Lasnamäe and Pirita	Erki Savisaar	Centre	1978	
Pärnu	Marko Šorin	Centre	1974	
Võru, Valga and Põlva	Tarmo Tamm	Centre	1953	
Jõgeva and Tartu	Marika Tuus-Laul	Centre	1951	
Haabersti, Põhja-Tallinn and Kristiine	Viktor Vassiljev	Centre	1953	
Võru, Valga and Põlva	Merry Aart	EKRE	1953	
Ida-Viru	Riho Breivel	EKRE	1952	
Jõgeva and Tartu	Peeter Ernits	EKRE	1953	
Järva and Viljandi	Kalle Grünthal	EKRE	1960	
Hiiu, Lääne and Saare	Helle-Moonika Helme	EKRE	1966	
Pärnu	Mart Helme	EKRE	1949	
Mustamäe and Nõmme	Martin Helme	EKRE	1976	
Tartu	Ruuben Kaalep	EKRE	1993	
Võru, Valga and Põlva	Uno Kaskpeit	EKRE	1957	
Jõgeva and Tartu	Kert Kingo	EKRE	1968	
Harju and Rapla	Rene Kokk	EKRE	1980	
Kesklinn, Lasnamäe and Pirita	Leo Kunnas	EKRE	1967	
Pärnu	Alar Laneman	EKRE	1962	
Harju and Rapla	Siim Pohlak	EKRE	1985	
Lääne-Viru	Anti Poolamets	EKRE	1971	
Harju and Rapla	Paul Puustusmaa	EKRE	1964	
Harju and Rapla	Henn Põlluaas	EKRE	1960	
Haabersti, Põhja-Tallinn and Kristiine	Urmas Reitelmann	EKRE	1958	
Tartu	Jaak Valge	EKRE	1955	
Harju and Rapla	Heiki Hepner	Isamaa	1966	
Jõgeva and Tartu	Aivar Kokk	Isamaa	1960	
Kesklinn, Lasnamäe and Pirita	Tarmo Kruusimäe	Isamaa	1967	
Kesklinn, Lasnamäe and Pirita	Viktoria Ladõnskaja-Kubits	Isamaa	1981	
Tartu	Mihhail Lotman	Isamaa	1952	
Pärnu	Andres Metsoja	Isamaa	1978	
Lääne-Viru	Üllar Saaremäe	Isamaa	1969	
Järva and Viljandi	Helir-Valdor Seeder	Isamaa	1964	
Haabersti, Põhja-Tallinn and Kristiine	Sven Sester	Isamaa	1969	
Võru, Valga and Põlva	Priit Sibul	Isamaa	1977	
Jõgeva and Tartu	Raivo Tamm	Isamaa	1965	
Haabersti, Põhja-Tallinn and Kristiine	Jaak Juske	SDE	1976	
Tartu	Toomas Jürgenstein	SDE	1964	
Võru, Valga and Põlva	Kalvi Kõva	SDE	1974	
Järva and Viljandi	Helmen Kütt	SDE	1961	
Ida-Viru	Eduard Odinets	SDE	1976	
Võru, Valga and Põlva	Ivari Padar	SDE	1965	
Tartu	Heljo Pikhof	SDE	1958	
Hiiu, Lääne and Saare	Reili Rand	SDE	1991	
Lääne-Viru	Indrek Saar	SDE	1973	
Haabersti, Põhja-Tallinn and Kristiine	Raimond Kaljulaid	SDE (Note: Officially seats as unaffiliated)	1982	votes with SDE
Ida-Viru	Siim Kiisler	Parempoolsed	1965	
Kesklinn, Lasnamäe and Pirita	Anastassia Kovalenko-Kõlvart	Unaffiliated	1991	left SDE, votes with Centre
Ida-Viru	Martin Repinski	Unaffiliated	1986	left Centre
Ida-Viru	Mihhail Stalnuhhin	Unaffiliated	1961	expelled from Centre
