= Priit Toobal =

Estonian politician and criminal

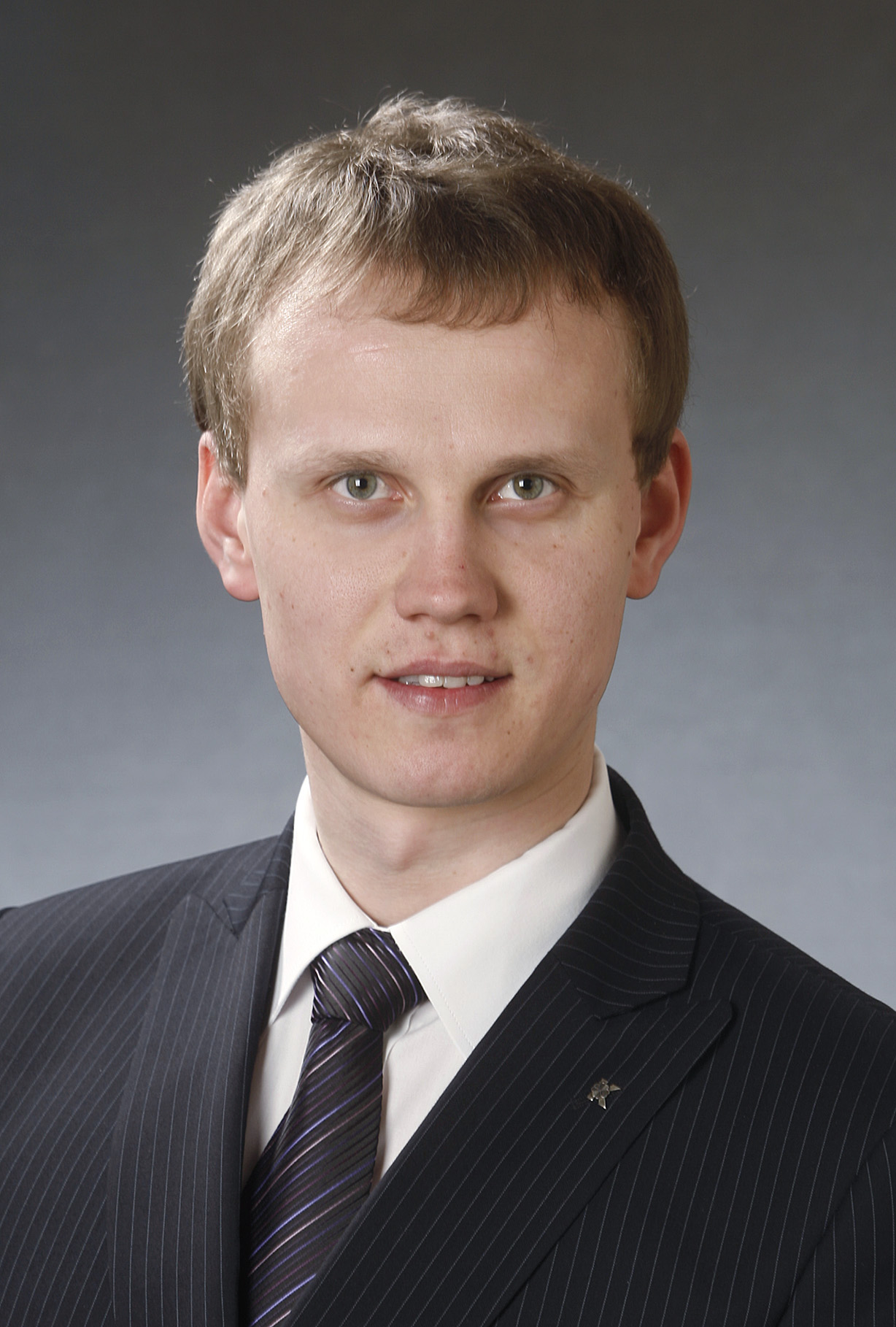
Priit Toobal in 2011

Priit Toobal (born 1 November 1983, in Suure-Jaani) is an Estonian former politician of the Estonian Centre Party. He was the Secretary General of the party from 2007 until 2015, the party's head officer in 2015, and former member of the Riigikogu between 2011 and 2015 representing the Järva County and Viljandi County constituency.

In October 2014, Toobal and Lauri Laasi were found guilty of instigating unauthorized surveillance after they had encouraged a third party to hack the email account of Hannes Rumm. Harju County Court gave Toobal a one-year suspended sentence with three years probation. Toobal and Laasi both appealed. The case was taken to the Supreme Court, which upheld the previously given sentence in November 2015. Toobal resigned from the parliament two days before the verdict. As a result, in 2015, the Estonian Taxpayers Association awarded Toobal the title of Taxpayer's Enemy, along with Mihhail Stalnuhhin.
