= Sulev =

Sulev may refer to:

- Super Ultra Low Emission Vehicle
- EML Sulev (M312), a minehunter
- Sulev (given name)
