= Kalev Kallo =

Estonian politician and committed criminal (1948–2024)

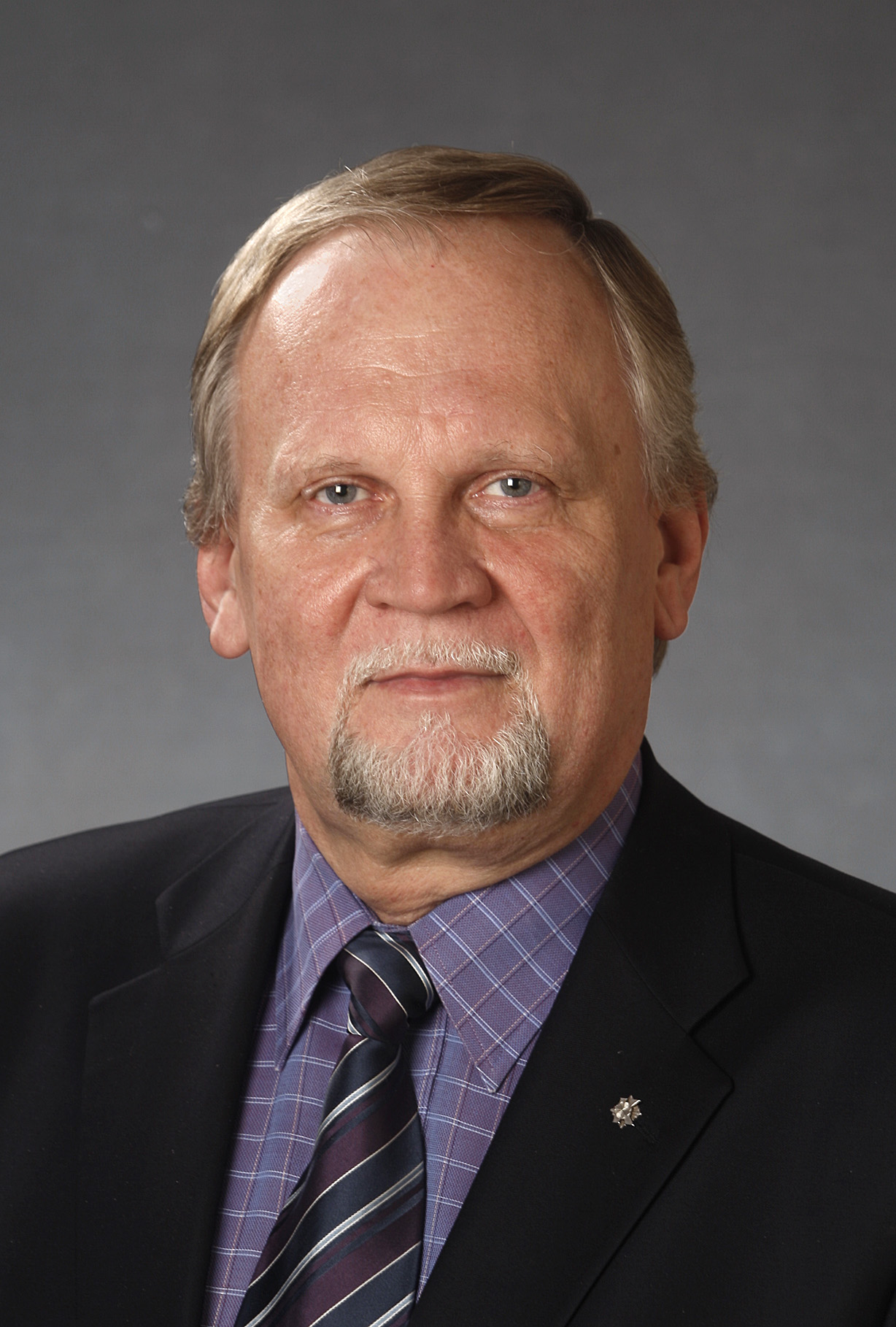
Kallo in 2011

Kalev Kallo (6 December 1948 – 30 May 2024) was an Estonian politician, convicted criminal and sports executive. He was a member of the XIV Riigikogu. From 1991 he belonged to the Estonian Centre Party.

== Life and career ==
Kallo was born in Tali Rural Municipality on 6 December 1948.

In 1995 he was the minister of roads and communication of Estonia (Estonian: Eesti teede- ja sideminister). He was Deputy Mayor of Tallinn from 1996 to 1999 and again from 2005 to 2007.

Between 2000 and 2008 he was president of the Estonian Boxing Association (Estonian: Eesti Poksiliit).

Kallo was a member of the IX, XI, XII and XIII Riigikogu.

In 2019 he was found guilty related to the bribery case of Edgar Savisaar, after which he lost his parliamentary immunity.

Kallo died on 30 May 2024, at the age of 75.
