= Voldemar Mettus =

Estonian journalist, writer, and translator (1894–1975)

- Born: September 24, 1894; Kilingi-Nõmme, Estonia
- Died: July 16, 1975 (aged 80); La Falda, Argentina
- Occupations: Journalist, writer, and translator

Voldemar Mettus (September 24, 1894 – July 16, 1975) was an Estonian theater figure, journalist, writer, and translator.

== Early life and education ==
Voldemar Mettus was born in Kilingi-Nõmme, Estonia, the son of Friedrich Mettus (1858–1918) Anna Marie Penjam (1867–?). He graduated from Riga Classical High School in 1913, and he studied ancient languages at the Institute of History and Linguistics in Petrograd from 1916 to 1918. He returned to Estonia in 1918 and took part in the Estonian War of Independence.

== Career ==
Mettus was a teacher at Jakob Westholm High School and the Drama Studio Theater School from 1920 to 1922, and he also worked as a theatre critic for the newspaper Päewaleht. From 1922 to 1924, he was a dramaturge and director at the Estonian Drama Theatre, and from 1924 to 1925 he worked at the Endla Theater. From 1925 to 1931, he was a director at the Vanemuine Theater, and from 1931 to 1932 he was also a dramaturge; he staged many classics there, including plays by William Shakespeare. From 1934 to 1936 he was a dramaturge at the Estonia Theater, from 1935 to 1938 he was the chairman of the Estonian Theater Endowment Fund, and from 1942 to 1944 he was the director of German-language productions of the Estonian Drama Theatre. In addition, he was a theater critic for the newspaper Postimees from 1932 to 1934 and for Päevaleht from 1938 to 1944.

In 1944, he fled the Soviet occupation to Germany during the Great Flight. He lived in a refugee camp in Denmark from 1945 to 1949, and from 1949 onward in Argentina, where he died. He contributed to refugee newspapers.

== Productions ==
- 1924: Simson by Frank Wedekind
- 1924: Kangelane (The Hero) by Jaan Kärner
- 1925: Saint Joan (Estonian title: Püha Johanna) by George Bernard Shaw
- 1926: The Merchant of Venice (Estonian title: Veneetsia kaupmees) by William Shakespeare
- 1927: The Taming of the Shrew (Estonian title: Põikpea taltsutus) by William Shakespeare
- 1927: Peer Gynt by Henrik Ibsen
- 1927: A Dream Play (Estonian title: Unenäomäng) by August Strindberg
- 1928: The Pretenders (Estonian title: Võitlus trooni pärast) by Henrik Ibsen
- 1932: As You Like It (Estonian title: Mida soovite) by William Shakespeare
- 1942: Pisuhänd (The Kratt; performed in German) by Eduard Vilde
- 1943: Richard der Grosse (performed in German; Estonian title: Richard Suur) by Géza von Cziffra

== Works ==
- 1931: Vanemuise teater, 1906–1931 (Vanemuine Theater, 1906–1931; Tartu: Vanemuine)
- 1935: Teatrisõnastik (Theatre Dictionary; Tallinn: Eesti Kirjastus-Ühisus)
- 1950: Narrid, näitlejad ja nõiad (Fools, Actors, and Witches; Vadstena: Orto)
- 1967: Süda peo peal (Heart at a Party; Lund: Eesti Kirjanike Kooperatiiv)
- 1967: Ainus paradiis (The Only Paradise; Lund: Eesti Kirjanike Kooperatiiv)
- 1969: Mask ja nägu (Mask and Face; Lund: Eesti Kirjanike Kooperatiiv)
- 1971: Soovimata külalised (Unwanted Guests; Lund: Eesti Kirjanike Kooperatiiv)

== Translations ==
- 1940: An Actor's Work by Konstantin Stanislavski, Estonian title: Näitleja töö enda kallal (Tallinn: Tallinna Eesti Kirjastus-Ühisus)
- 1956: A World Apart by Gustaw Herling-Grudziński, Estonian title: Maailm omaette (Toronto: Estoprint)
- 1961: Don Segundo Sombra by Ricardo Güiraldes (Vadstena: Orto)
