= Urmo (given name) =

Male given name

- Gender: Male
- Language: Estonian
- Name day: 30 October

Origin
- Region of origin: Estonia

Other names
- Related names: Urmas, Urmet

Urmo is an Estonian masculine given name. The name is often a diminutive of the given names Urmas and Urmet.

As of 1 January 2021, 435 men in Estonia have the first name Urmo, making it the 293rd most popular male name in the country. The name Urmo is most frequently found in individuals in the 35-39 age group, where 6.97 per 10,000 inhabitants of Estonia bear the name. The name is most commonly found in Valga County, where 7.14 per 10,000 inhabitants of the county bear the name.

Individuals bearing the name Urmo include:

- Urmo Aava (born 1979), rally driver
- Urmo Ilves (born 1974), draughts player
- Urmo Kööbi (1939–2016), physician and politician
- Urmo Raus, (born 1969), painter
- Urmo Soonvald (born 1973), journalist
