= Riina Sildos =

Estonian film producer

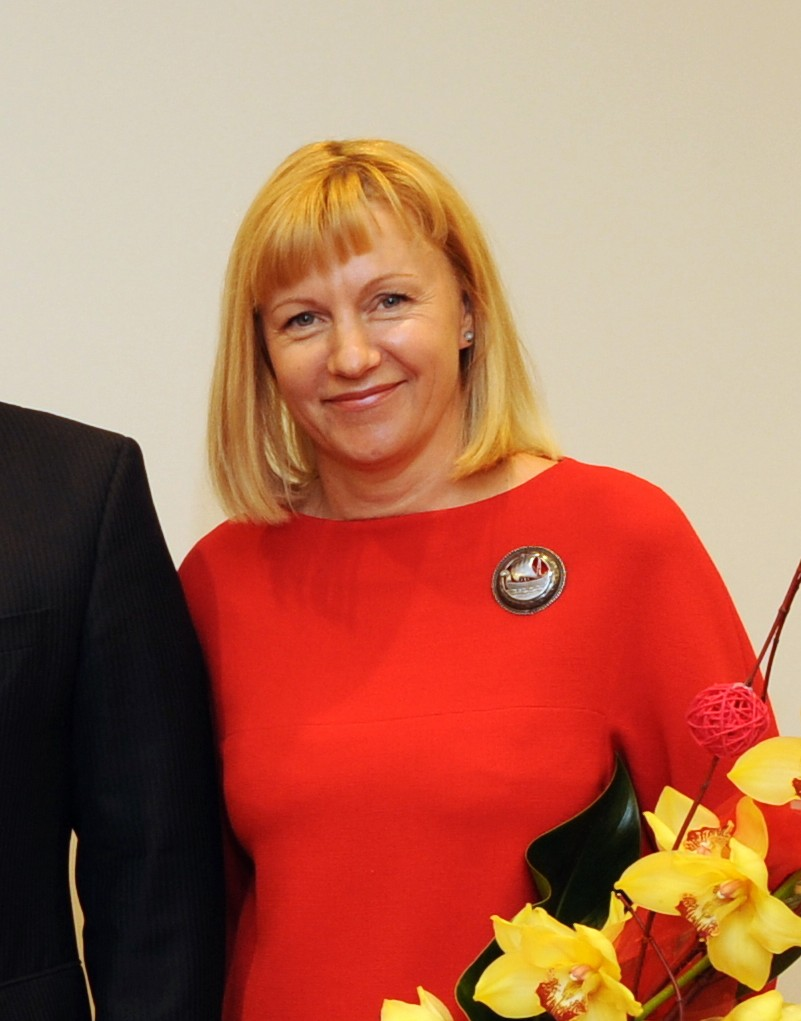
Riina Sildos

Riina Sildos (born 21 July 1964) is an Estonian film producer.

Sildos was born and raise in Tallinn. After graduating from Tallinn Secondary School No. 7 (now, Tallinn English College). in 1982, she enrolled in the University of Tartu, majoring in Russian language and literature, graduating in 1987 with a dissertation on film semiotics, supervised by Professor Juri Lotman. Sildos continued postgraduate studies the same year at the university's Academy of Sciences.

Sildos began her career a film critic for Eesti Rahvusringhääling (Estonian Public Broadcasting). In 1994, she joined Eesti Raadio, where she worked as a senior editor, then programme director until 2000, when she was appointed managing director of the Estonian Film Foundation. In 1998 Riina was one of the founders of the Tallinn International Film Festival – the Black Nights Film Festival.

Sildos established Amrion Productions in 2003.

In 2008 she was awarded with Order of the White Star, V class.

Sildos' daughter is activist and politician Johanna-Maria Lehtme.

== Selected filmography ==
- 2006 Leiutajateküla Lotte (Lotte from Gadgetville)
- 2007 Klass (The Class)
- 2008 Mina olin siin (I Was Here)
- 2011 Lotte ja kuukivi saladus (Lotte and the Moonstone Secret)
- 2012 A Lady in Paris
- 2016 Teesklejad
- 2018 Seltsimees laps (Little Comrade)
- 2018 Mihkel (co-producer)
- 2018 Sorjonen (Bordertown; Finnish television)
