= Heiki Hepner =

Estonian politician

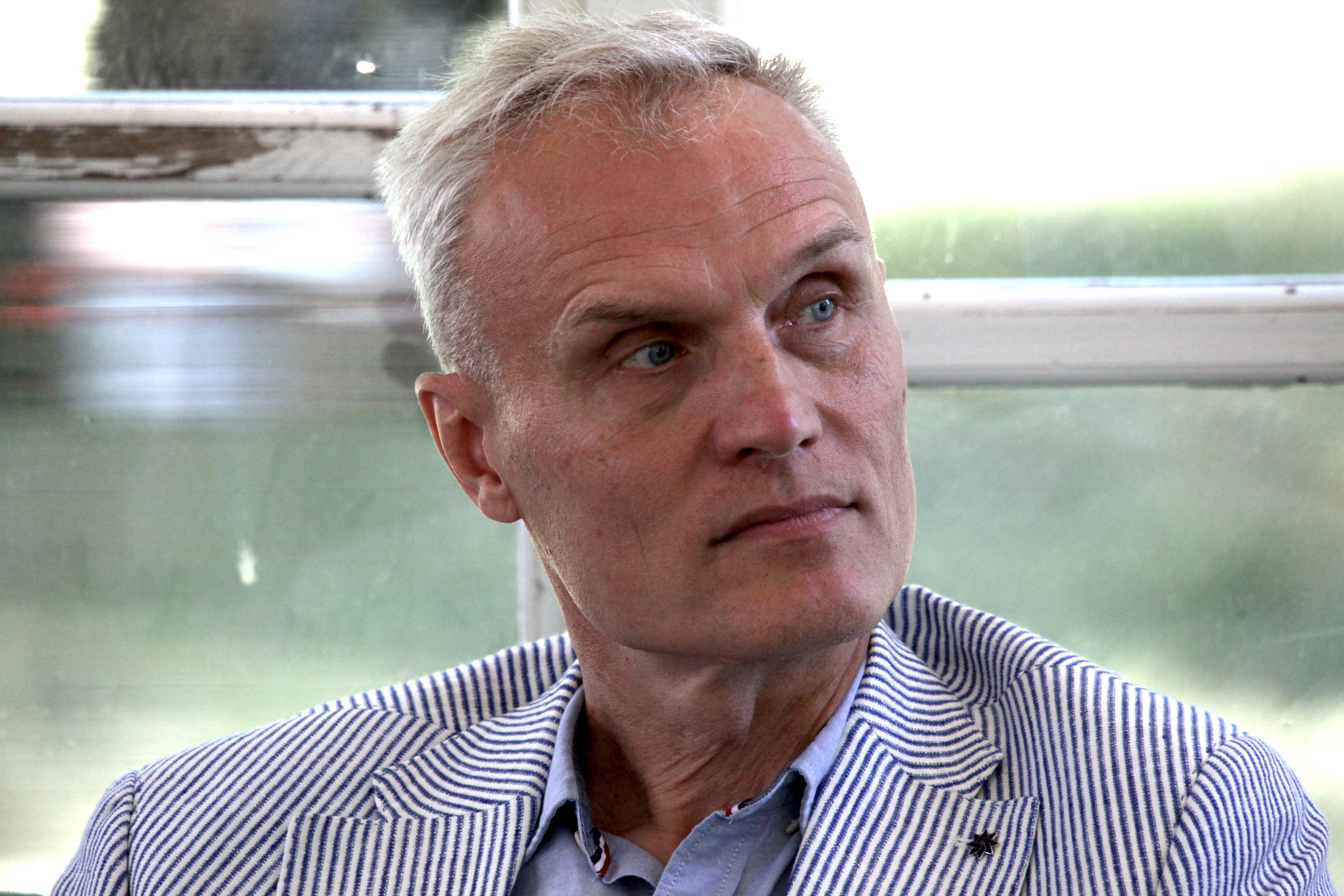
Heiki Hepner

Heiki Hepner (born 17 February 1966 in Haapsalu) is an Estonian politician. He has been a member of XIV Riigikogu.

In 1991 he graduated from Estonian University of Life Sciences with a degree in forestry engineering.

From 2008 to 2012 he was the president of the Estonian Forest Society.

Since 2004 he has been a member of the Isamaa party.
