= Kilingi-Nõmme =

Town in Estonia

- Town
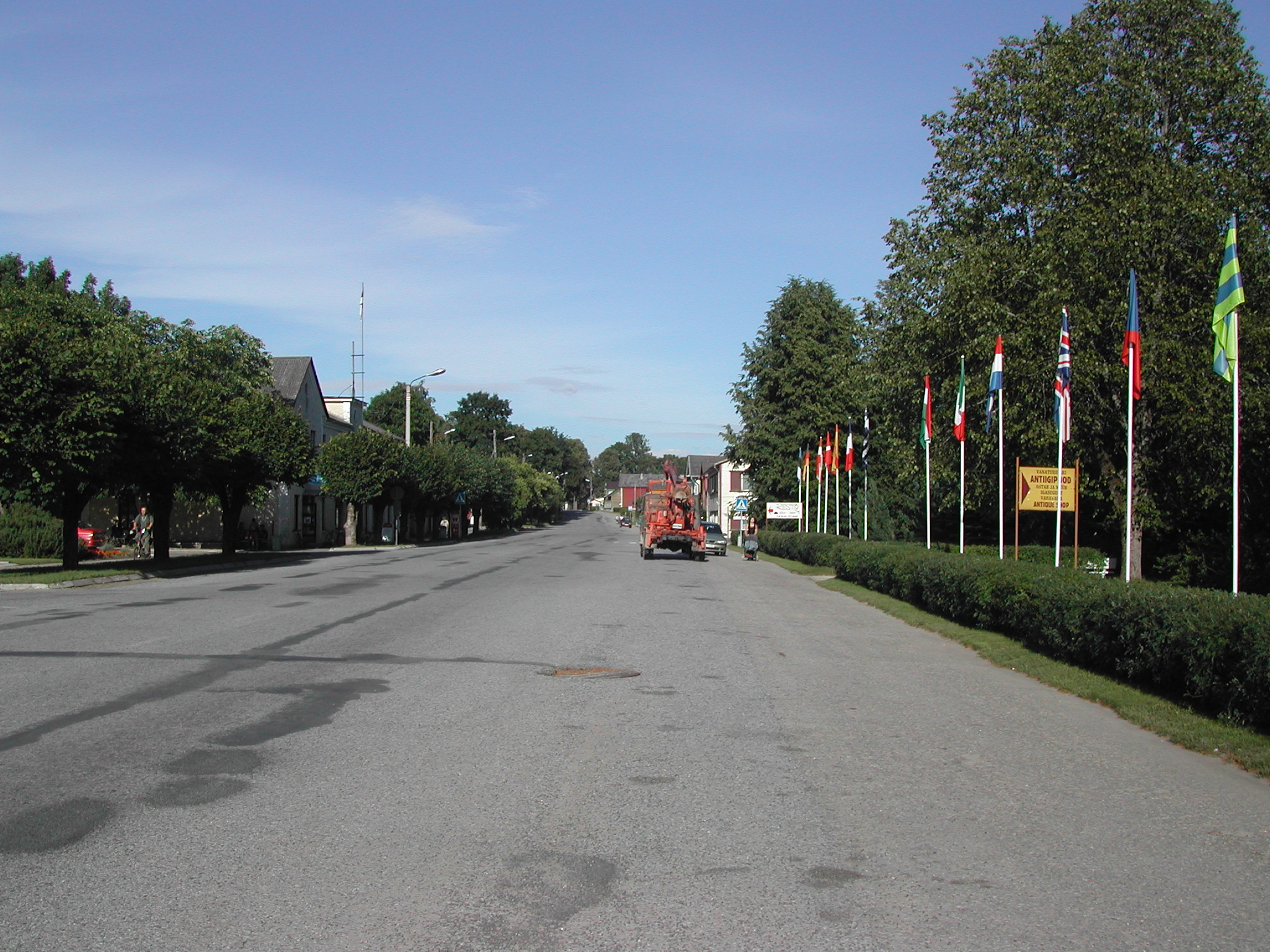
- The main street in Kilingi-Nõmme

- Location in Estonia
- Coordinates: 58°08′59″N 24°57′41″E
- Country: Estonia
- County: Pärnu County
- Municipality: Saarde Parish
- First mentioned: 1560
- Borough rights: 1919
- Town rights: 1 May 1938

Area
  - Total: 4.26 km^{2} (1.64 sq mi)

Population (2026)
  - Total: 1,567
  - Rank: 37th
  - Density: 368/km^{2} (953/sq mi)
- Time zone: UTC+2 (EET)
  - Summer (DST): UTC+3 (EEST)
- Postal code: 86301 to 86305
- Area code: (+372) 44
- Vehicle registration: F

Kilingi-Nõmme is a town in Pärnu County, southwestern Estonia. It is the administrative centre of Saarde Parish. It is located on the intersection of Valga–Uulu (Valga–Pärnu, no. 6) and Tartu–Viljandi–Kilingi-Nõmme (no. 92) roads, about 11 km (7 mi) from the Estonian border with Latvia.

== History ==
The settlement was first mentioned in 1560, when a manor named Ovelgunne (also Kurkund) belonging to the Schilling family was established. In 1789 a tavern was opened in the nearby Nõmme farmstead. Hence in the name "Kilingi-Nõmme", Kilingi derived from the Schilling surname. In the 1870s when most of the manor's land was handed out to Orthodox believers, the settlement started to develop faster. Local congregation was established in 1845, and a parish school three years later. Kilingi-Nõmme was then the centre of the surrounding Saarde Parish.

After the establishment of sawmill, flour mill and spinning factory, Kilingi-Nõmme gained the borough rights in 1919 and eventually the town rights on 1 May 1938.

On 20 April 1937, a fire in an elementary school and poisonous fumes killed 17 students and injured 50 after film inside of a school movie projector caught fire and set fire to other open canisters of film.

In 1896, a Pärnu–Mõisaküla–Rūjiena–Valga narrow gauge railway (750 mm (2 ft 5 1/2 in)) was built, the station in Kilingi-Nõmme was opened in 1917, before that the nearest station was Woltveti 1.7 km (1.1 mi) southeast in Tihemetsa. In 1975 the narrow gauge railway was closed and a new 1,520 mm (4 ft 11 27/32 in) Russian gauge railway (1,524 mm (5 ft)) was opened in 1981 as part of the Tallinn–Pärnu–Riga railway. Eventually this was also closed in 2000 and dismantled in 2008.

After Estonia regained its independence in 1991, Kilingi-Nõmme served as a sovereign municipality, but merged with neighbouring Saarde and Tali parishes in 2005, and became the centre of the new Saarde Parish.

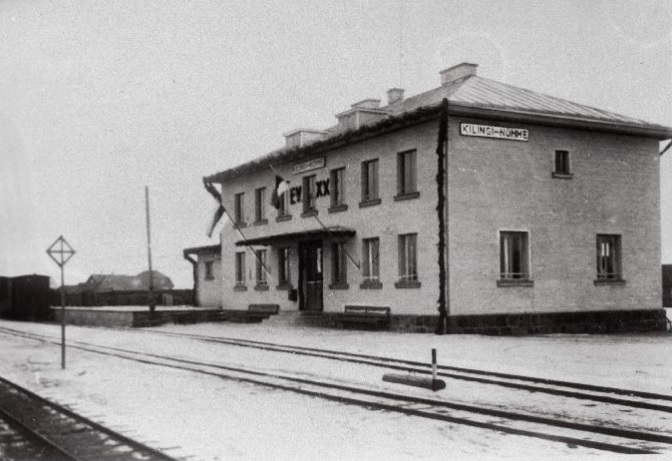
The now defunct Kilingi-Nõmme railway station

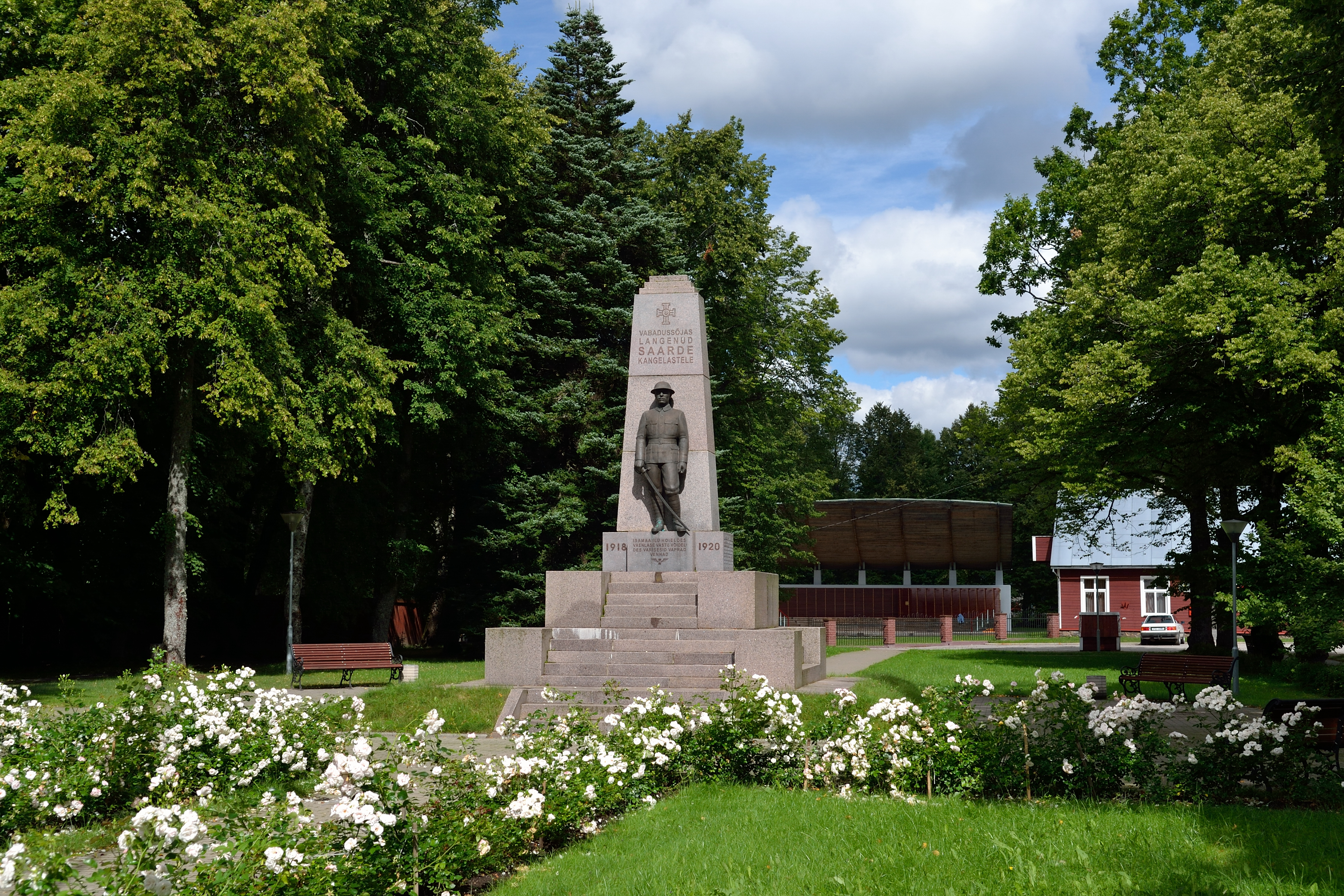
Memorial to those of Saarde Parish who fought in the Estonian War of Independence

== Population ==
As of the 2011 census, the town's population was 1,763.

Population development
Year	1900	1928	1934	1959	1970	1979	1989	2000	2003	2006	2008	2010
Population	ca 500	1422	1663	2141	2319	2507	2504	2223	2207	2144	2106	2082

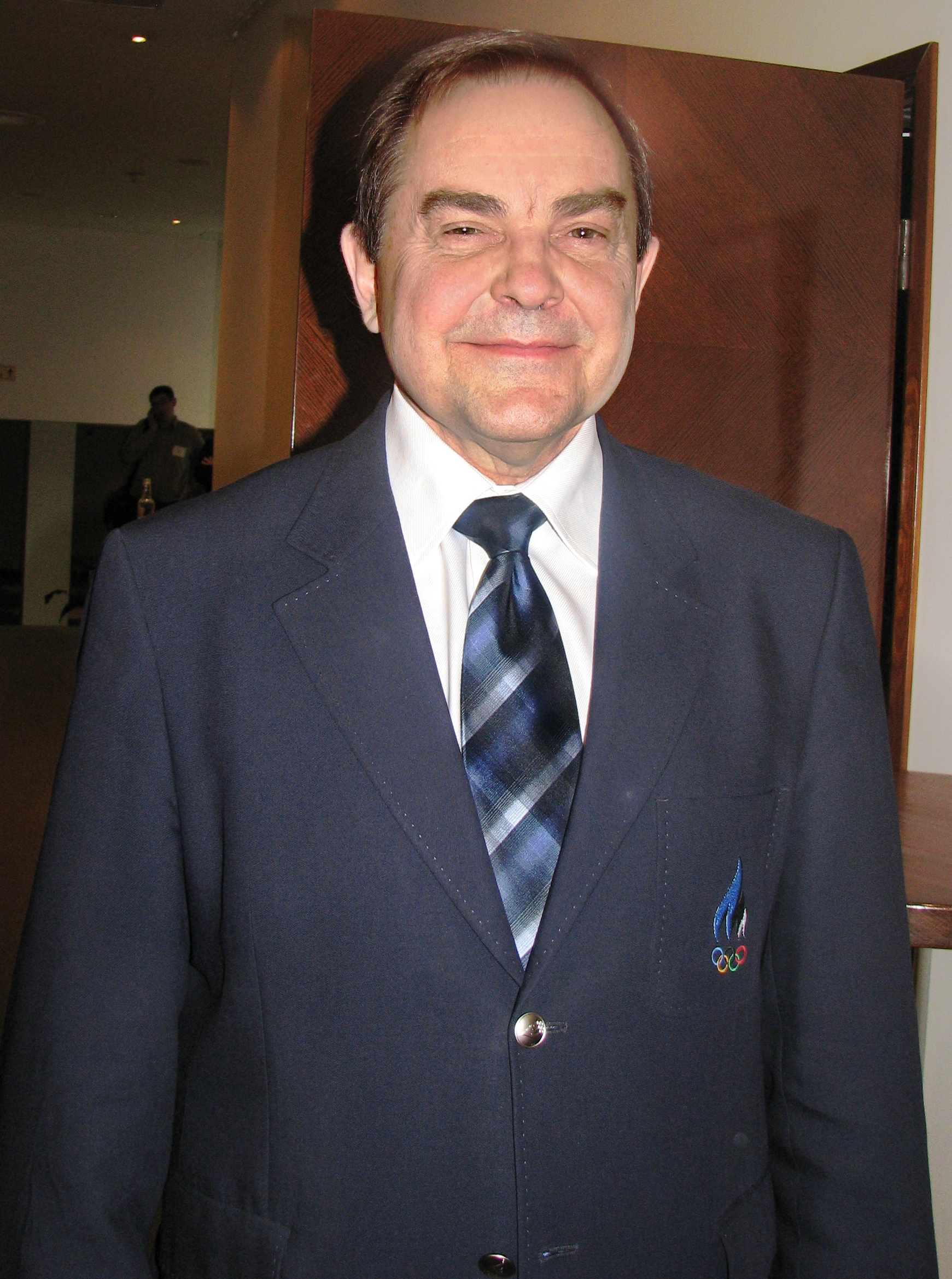
Mart Siimann 2010

== Notable people ==
- Marie Reisik (1887–1941), teacher, women rights activist and politician.
- Voldemar Mettus (1894–1975), journalist, writer, and translator
- Pent Nurmekund (1906–1996), linguist
- Jaak Herodes (born 1944), politician, the mayor of Käru, 1997 to 2002
- Mart Siimann (born 1946), politician, Prime Minister of Estonia, 1997 to 1999
- Helene Vannari (1948–2022), stage, radio, TV and film actress.
- Ants Laaneots (born 1948), military commander, former Commander of the Estonian Defence Forces
- Toomas Voll (born 1958), composer and choral conductor
- Liisi Koikson (born 1983), singer, singing teacher and actress.
