= Toomas Järveoja =

Estonian politician

Toomas Järveoja (born 23 April 1961) is an Estonian politician. He is a member of the XIV Riigikogu.

He was born in Elva. In 1984, he graduated from the Tallinn University of Technology.

From 2011 until 2015, he was the mayor of Elva. His son is rally co-driver Martin Järveoja.
