= Marko Torm =

Estonian politician (born 1980)

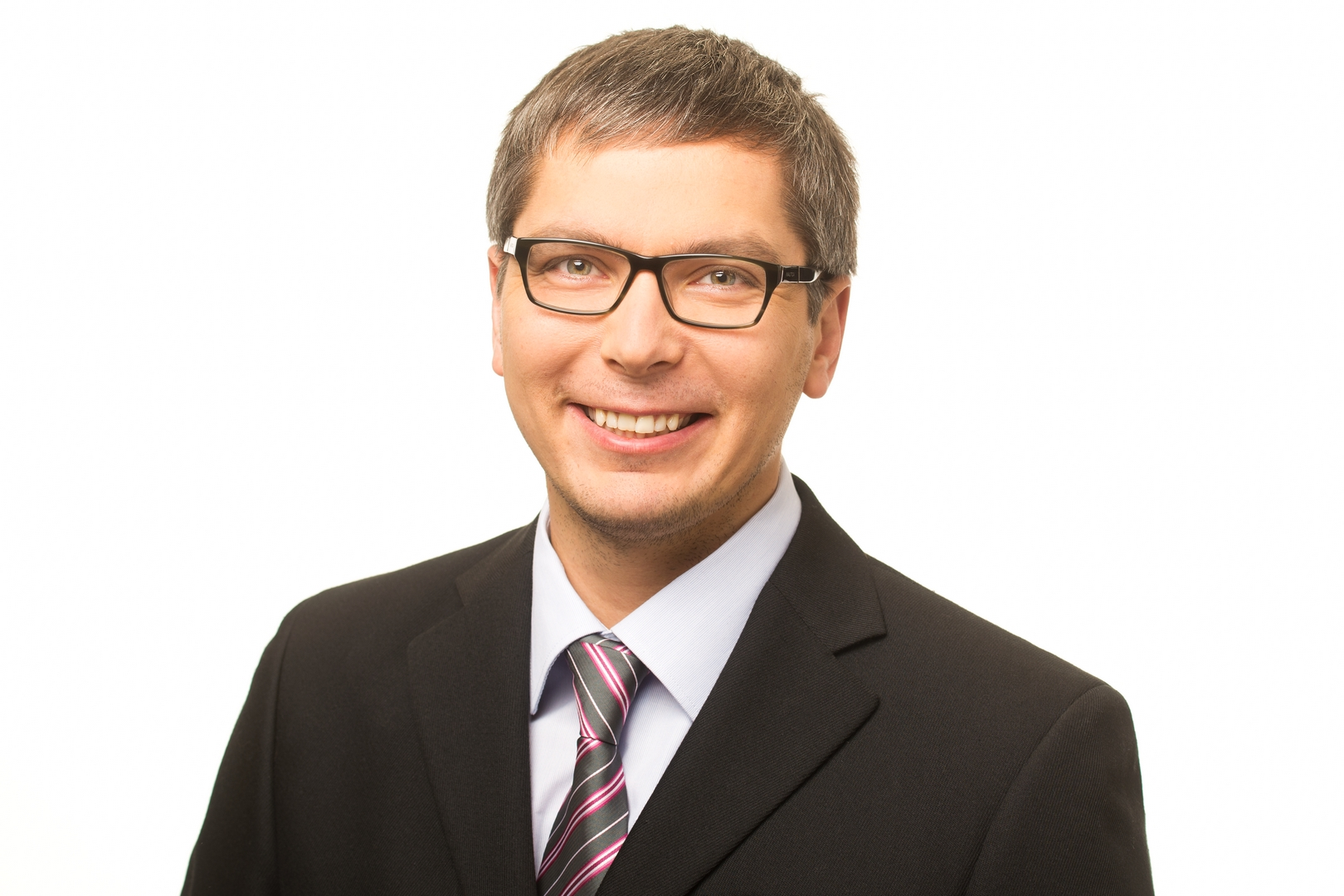
Marko Torm (2014)

Marko Torm (born 2 March 1980 in Kohtla-Järve) is an Estonian politician. He was a member of XIV Riigikogu and was Mayor of Rakvere from 2017 until 2019.

Since 2010, he has been a member of the Estonian Reform Party.
