= Jaak Herodes =

Estonian politician (born 1944)

Jaak Herodes (born 5 June 1944 in Kilingi-Nõmme) is an Estonian politician. He was a member of VII Riigikogu. From 1997 to 2002, he was the mayor of Käru.
