= Toomas Voll =

Estonian composer and conductor

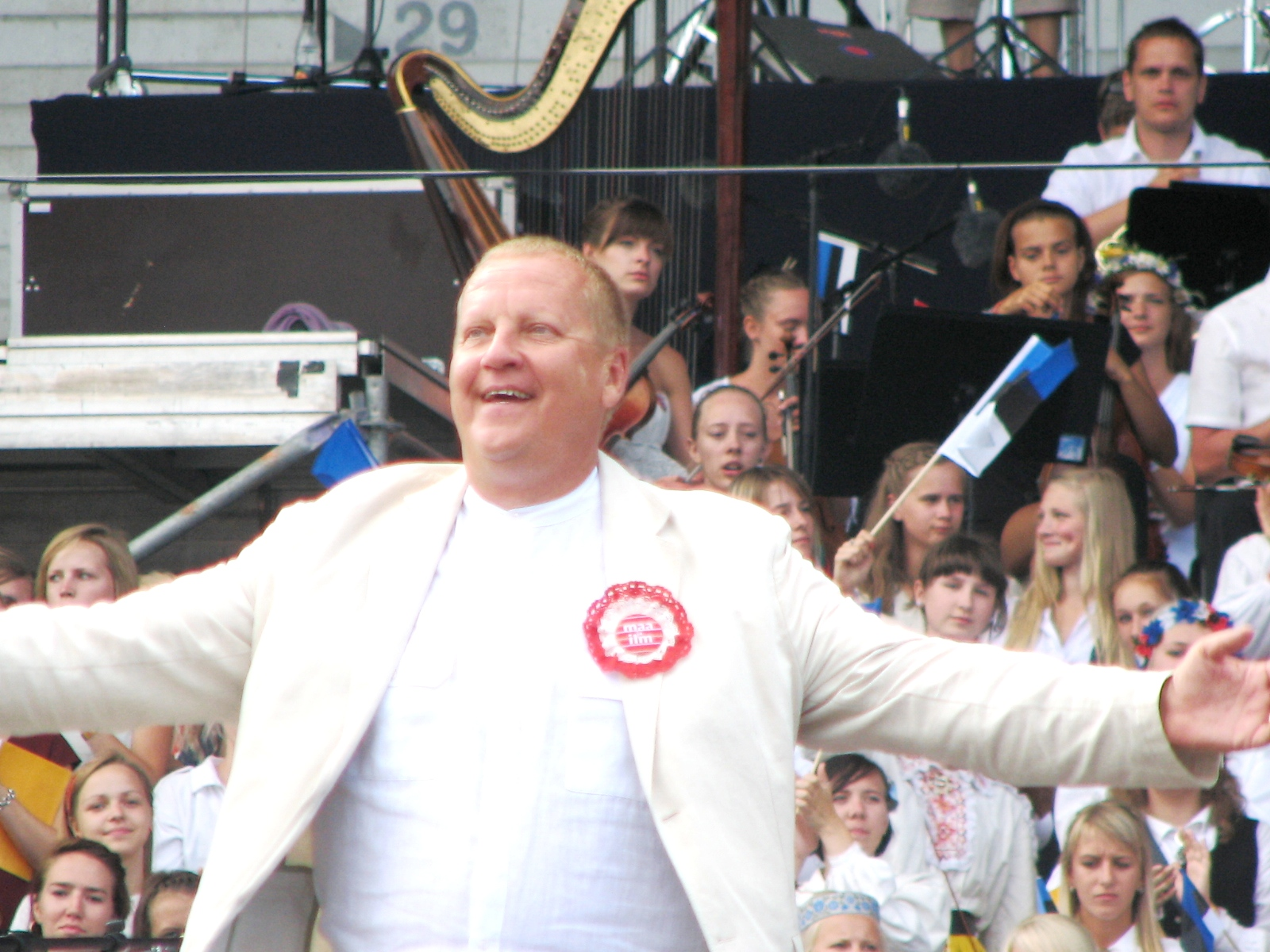
Toomas Voll

Toomas Voll (born 17 June 1958 in Kilingi-Nõmme) is an Estonian composer, conductor and choir director.

From 1976 to 1979, he studied music pedagogics at Tallinn State Conservatory. Voll has also served as the Choir Conductor at Tallinn University.

In 1996, he founded Toomas Voll Singing Studio. In 1996, he also founded Leelo National Girls' Choir, and was its conductor until 2006.

He has conducted at several Estonian Song Festivals.

Awards:

- 1995: "Teacher of the Year"
- 2008: Order of the White Star, V class

== Works ==
He has written over 50 songs for children and choirs.
