= Hele Everaus =

Estonian medical scientist

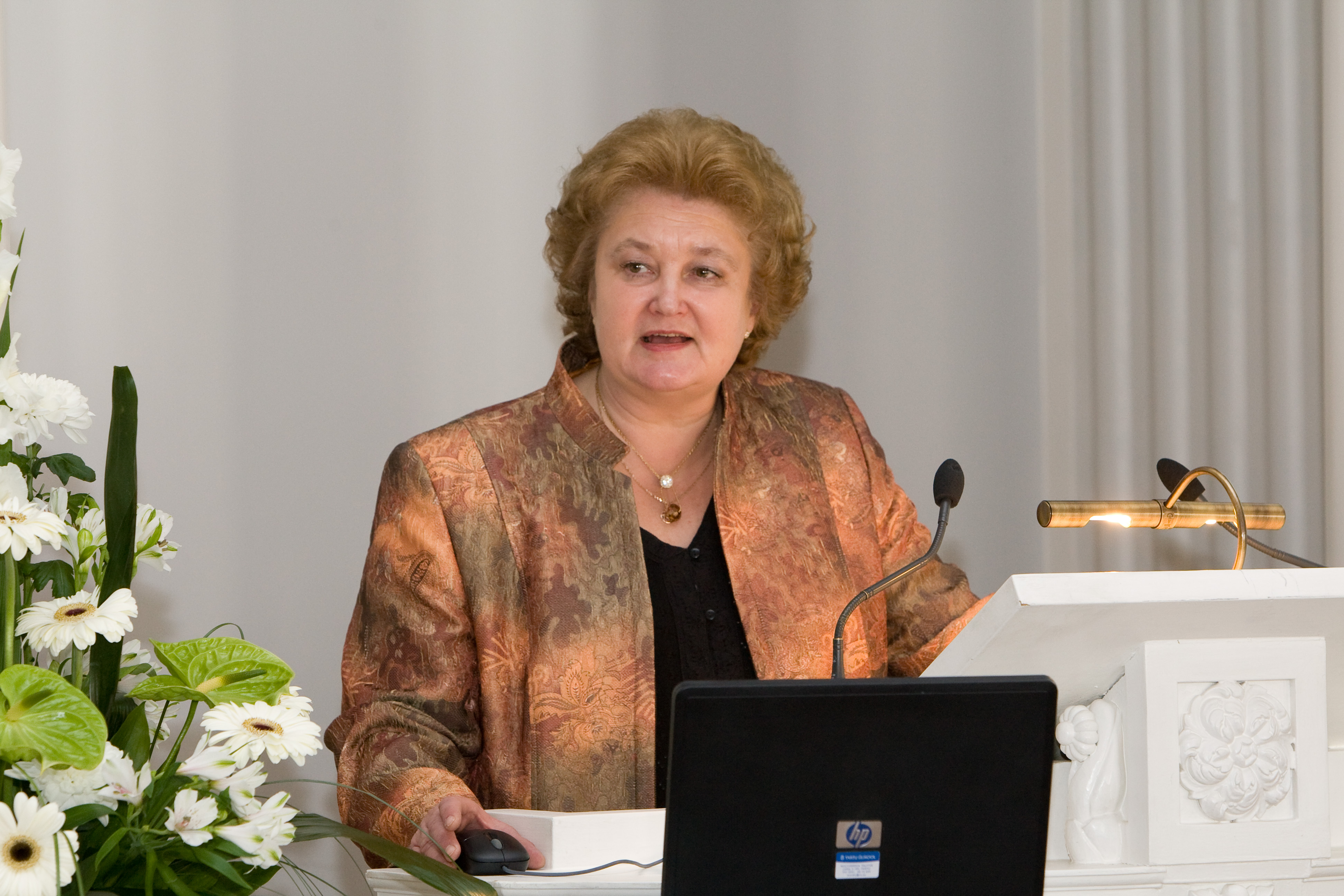
Hele Everaus in 2008

Hele Everaus (born 5 January 1953 in Tartu) is an Estonian medical scientist, physician and politician. She has been a member of the XIV Riigikogu. In 1993, she was the first to perform bone marrow transplantation in the Baltic States.

== Biography ==
Hele Everaus was born and raised in Tartu and graduated from Tartu 5th Secondary School in 1971 and from Tartu State University Faculty of Medicine in 1977 (cum laude). In 1984 she defended her medical candidate's thesis and in 1993 she defended her medical doctor's thesis.

In the years 1977–1980, she was a senior laboratory technician at the Institute of General and Molecular Pathology of Tartu State University. From 1980–1987 she served as an assistant at the internal medicine department of the internal clinic, and from 1987–1993 an associate professor. From 1985, she was also the head of the hematology laboratory at the Faculty of Medicine. In the years 1993–1999, she was an extraordinary professor in the field of hematology, and in 1993–1999, she was the head of the intensive hematology department of Tartu Children's Hospital.

In the years 1998–2003, Hele Everaus was the development vice-rector of the University of Tartu, From 2000 to 2004 she was professor of the hematology-oncology clinic of the Faculty of Medicine, and until 2016 was the chair of hematology-oncology. Since 2017, she has been an emeritus professor and consulting physician.

== Political activity ==
Hele Everaus has been a member of the Estonian Reform Party since 1994 and was also its founding member.

She has been a member of the Tartu City Council from 1996 to 2019 and again from 2021.

In the 2019 Riigikogu elections, Hele Everaus ran in district No. 10 in Tartu and received 1,110 votes. She joined the XIV Riigikoku as a substitute member of Urmas Klaas. In the 2023 Riigikogu elections, when running in the same electoral district, she received 712 votes and was not elected.

== Honors ==
- 1998 Medal of the Faculty of Medicine of the University of Tartu
- 2001 Order of the Estonian Red Cross III class
- 2003 University of Tartu badge of honor
- 2009 Tartu lady of the years
- 2014 European Society for Blood and Marrow Transplantation (EBMT) Lifetime Achievement Award
- 2016 University of Tartu Grand Medal
- In 2023, his footprints were placed on the Tartu Pioneers' Alley
