= Arvo Haug =

Estonian politician

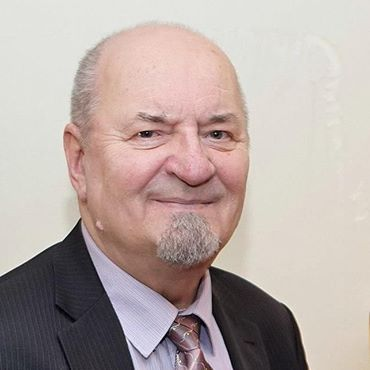
Arvo Haug

Arvo Haug (born 14 May 1938 Tallinn) is an Estonian psychiatrists and politician, representing the Estonian Centre Party. He was a member of VII, VIII, and IX Riigikogu.
