= Buduaar =

Fashion magazine

- Editor: Triin Tisler (managing editor)
- Categories: Women's magazine
- Frequency: 6 times per year
- Founded: 2003
- Country: Estonia
- Language: Estonian, Russian
- Website: buduaar.ee
- ISSN: 1736-4795

Buduaar (from French: boudoir) is an Estonian women's magazine. It was founded in Tallinn in 2003. Its content generally includes articles discussing fashion, beauty, family, sex, health, alternative medicine, and esotericism. The magazine is published 6 times a year. The chief executive officer is Marge Tava.
