= Hannes Rumm =

Estonian politician (born 1968)

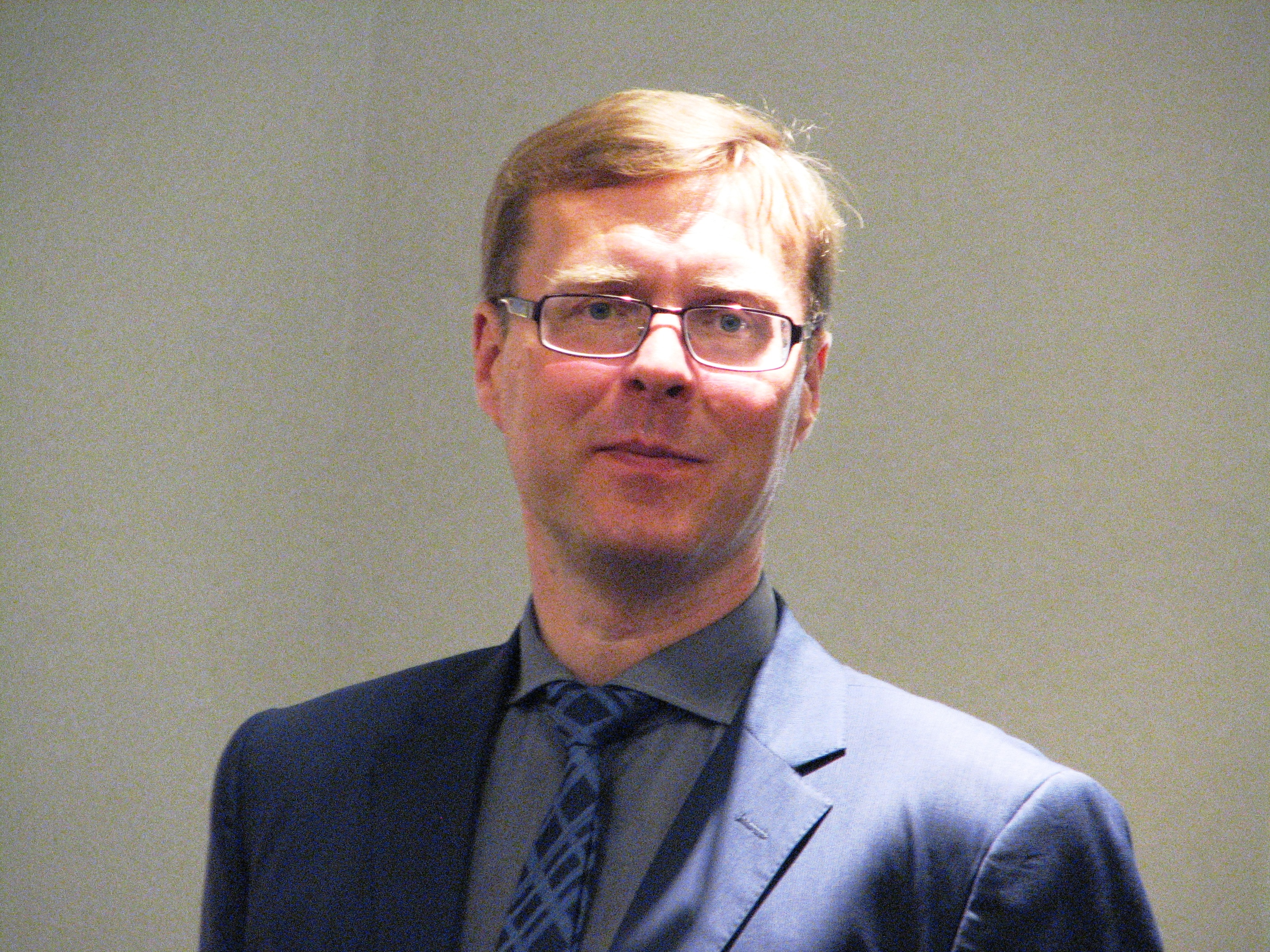
Hannes Rumm in 2014

Hannes Rumm (born 11 November 1968) is an Estonian journalist and politician. He was a member of XI Riigikogu.

He has been a member of Estonian Social Democratic Party.

In 2004 he was awarded with Order of the Cross of the Eagle, IV class.
