= Lauri Laasi =

Estonian politician (born 1974)

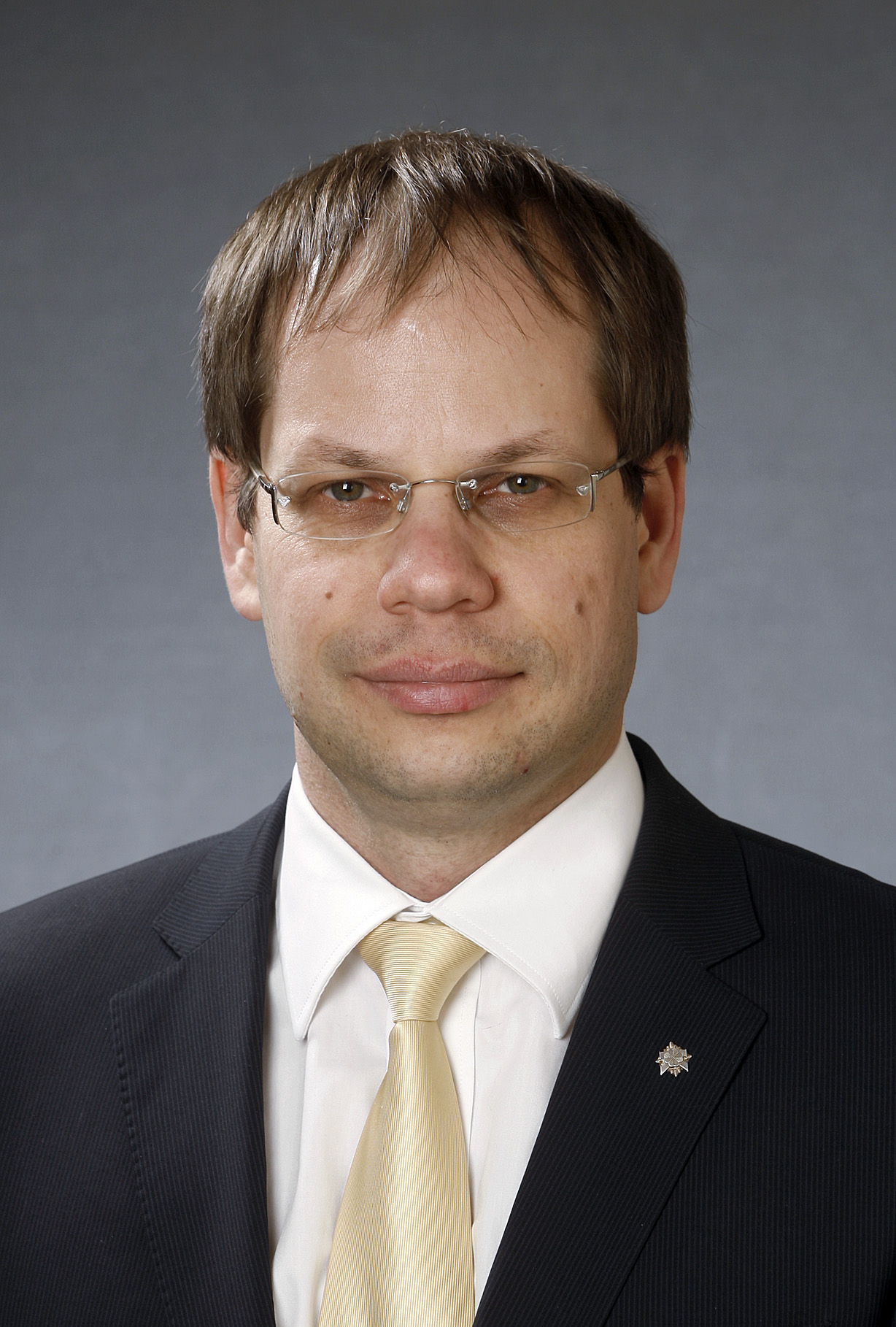
Laasi in 2011

Lauri Laasi (born 12 September 1974 in Kilingi-Nõmme, Pärnu County) is an Estonian politician. He has been a member of the X, XI, XII and XIII Riigikogu.

In 2000 he graduated from Tallinn University with a degree in social work.

Since 1997 he has been a member of the Estonian Centre Party.

From 2002 to 2009 he was a member of the Tallinn City Council.
