= Natalia Malleus =

Estonian politician

Natalia Malleus (née Malysheva; born on 23 January 1954 in Sevastopol) is a Russian-born Estonian politician. She was a member of the XIV Riigikogu.

In 1976 she graduated from Tallinn University of Technology in industrial and civil engineering.

From 1978 until 1997, she worked at Eesti Televisioon, acting as a Russian language announcer and presenter as well as an editor. From 2004 until 2014, she worked as an editor and announcer for the Russian-language television channel Pervy Baltiysky Kanal (PBK).

Since 2015 she has been a member of Estonian Centre Party.
