= Sulev Kannimäe =

Estonian politician

Sulev Kannimäe (born 16 June 1951 in Kiviõli) is an Estonian politician. He was a member of the XIV Riigikogu. In 1994, he graduated from Estonian University of Life Sciences with a degree in agricultural economics and management. He has been a member of the Estonian Reform Party since 2010.
