= Sulev Teinemaa =

Estonian film journalist (1947–2020)

Sulev Teinemaa (10 September 1947 Harju-Risti – 9 May 2020) was an Estonian film journalist.

In 1971 he graduated from Tallinn Polytechnical Institute in electronics, and 1991 Tartu University in journalism. 1971-1988 he worked at the factory Hans Pöögelman Electronics Factory (Estonian: Hans Pöögelmanni nimeline Elektroonika Tehas). Since 1988 he was a film editor for the magazine Teater. Muusika. Kino. He wrote film articles for different publications, including for Estonian Encyclopedia.

Awards:

- 1998: Film Journalist of the Year
