= Vladimir Arhipov =

Estonian politician (born 1955)

Vladimir Arhipov (born 26 September 1955) is an Estonian politician. He was a member of XIII Riigikogu.

He has been a member of the Estonian Centre Party. Arhipov was the mayor of Maardu from 1995 to 1996 and again from 2016.
