= Johanna-Maria Lehtme =

Estonian activist

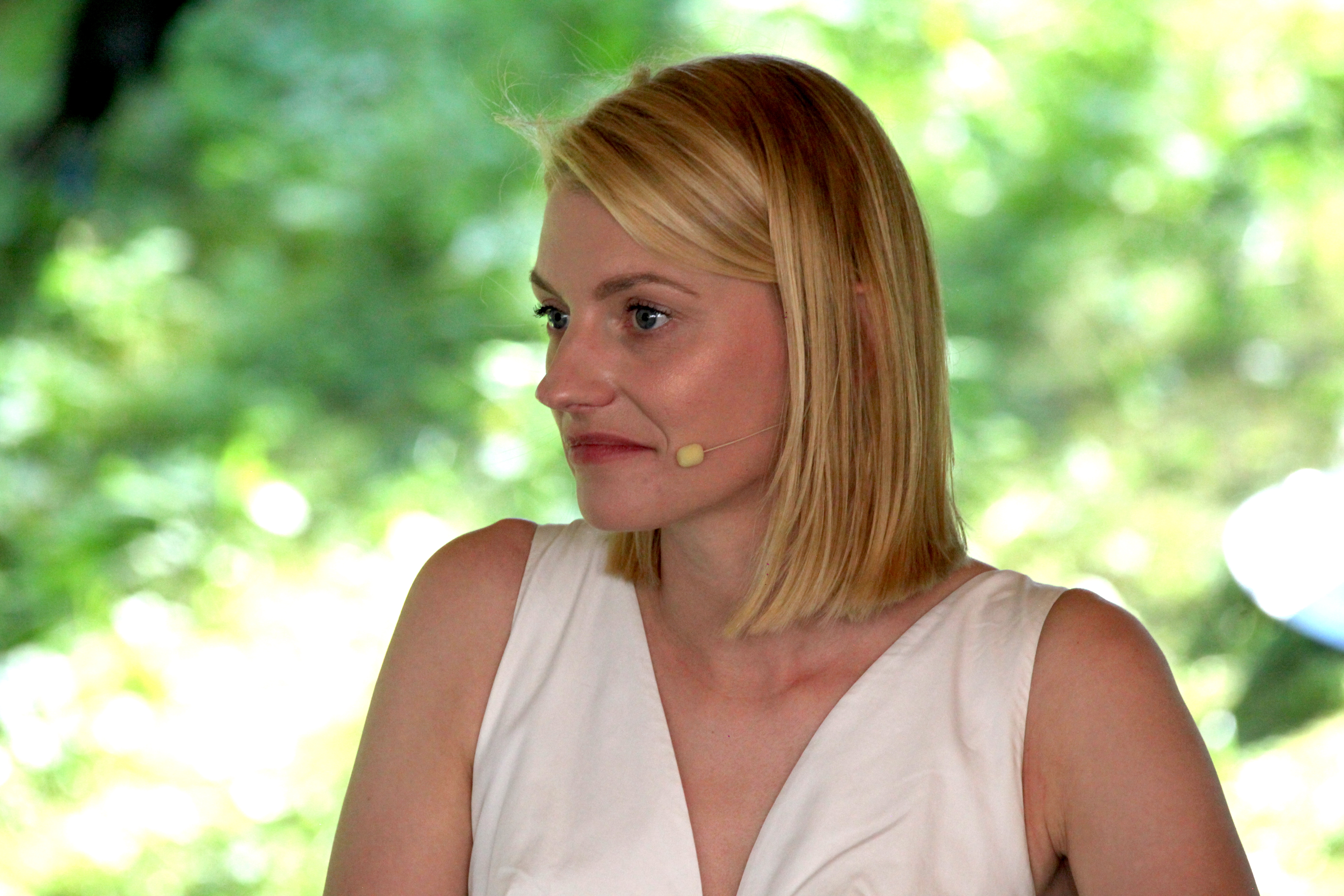
Johanna-Maria Lehtme

Johanna-Maria Lehtme (born 1 October 1988) is an Estonian politician, cultural organizer and activist who was the founder and leader of the non-governmental organization Slava Ukraini, which organized humanitarian aid to Ukraine from Estonia.

Lehtme is the daughter of Estonian filmmaker Riina Sildos. She graduated from the Faculty of Law of the University of Tartu with a bachelor's degree in 2011.

Following the 2023 Estonian parliamentary election, she was elected as a member of the XV Riigikogu, representing the Estonia 200 party, although she was never a member of the party. Due to a financial scandal relating to the organization of Slava Ukraini, she vacated her position in the Riigikogu, and was replaced by Züleyxa Izmailova.

Since 2023, she has been under criminal investigation on the suspicion of, in her role as a board member, partially diverting assets belonging to the non-governmental organization to benefit third parties, thereby causing financial damage to Slava Ukraini and breaching the trust given to her by the organization in contract matters. In the fall of 2024, the non-governmental organization reported ceasing its operations due to lack of donations. As of 2026, Lehtme's whereabouts were not known.
