= Sulev Mäeltsemees =

Estonian academic

Sulev Mäeltsemees (born 7 August 1947) is an Estonian public administration and local government scholar and generally held to be the father of municipal autonomy in Estonia.

Born in Tallinn, Mäeltsemees received his degrees from the University of Tartu and worked, among others, as director of the Department of Social Infrastructure and Regional Economics of the Institute of Economics of the Estonian Academy of Sciences (1986-1992). He is currently professor and chair of regional policy at Tallinn University of Technology, where he already worked from 1978 to 1986 and from 2005 to 2016 also serves as dean of the Faculty of Social Sciences and Humanities.

In 1992-1993 he was chairman of the Tallinn city council, and from 1993-1997 the director of the Estonian Institute of Public Management, the state's central in-service training agency for civil servants.
