= Urmas Espenberg =

Estonian writer and politician

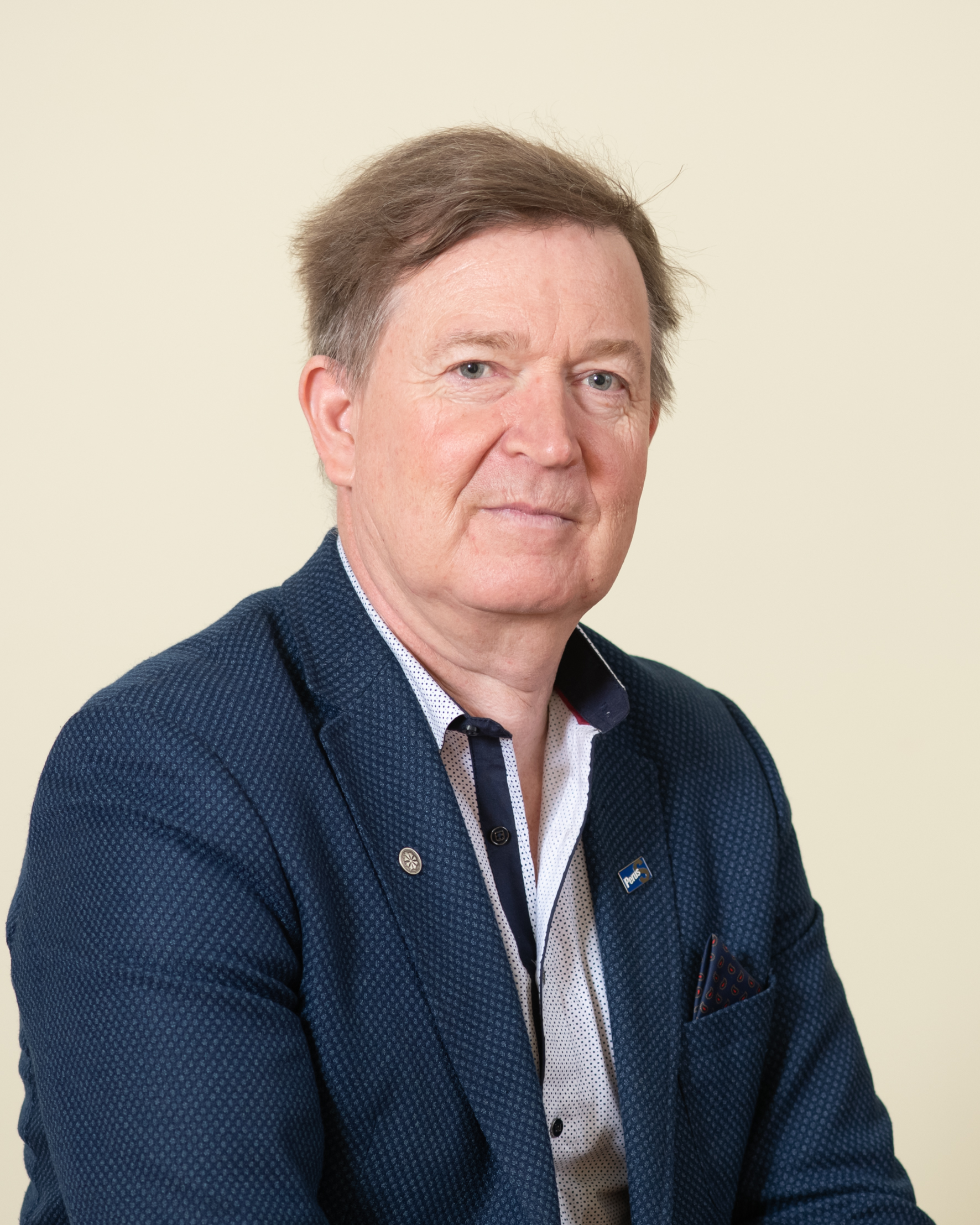

Personal details
- Born: 4 July 1961 (age 65) Aa, Ida-Viru County, then part of Estonian SSR, Soviet Union
- Party: Conservative People's Party of Estonia
- Education: Moscow State University

Urmas Espenberg (born 4 July 1961) is an Estonian author, politician and publicist, member of the XIV Riigikogu as an alternate member.

== Career and education ==
In 1984, he graduated from Moscow State University. From 1991 to 1993, he attended Catonsville Community College. He is a member and spokesperson of the Conservative People's Party of Estonia the right-wing populist party in Estonia, and sits on its board.

== Political views ==
He is quoted as having written on an Estonian National conservative news and opinion portal: "A person's personal life remains. And that life would be safe and pleasant then. Far from it – hordes of low-IQ immigrants and Islamic radicals make it disgusting and downright dangerous by forcing their views and beliefs."

== Publications ==
Books

- "Tequila pööripäev" (Agitaator/Kollane raamat: 2002)
- "Otsin naist (2. osa)" (Agitaator/Kollane raamat: 2003)
- "Diskreetne passioon: Filosoofiline reality-romaan elust banaanivabariigis" (Kentaur: 2004)
- "Erose kütkeis: Filosoofilis-sotsioloogiline seksuaaluurimus" (Pegasus: 2005)
- "Kestvad kiiduavaldused. Valitud esseed (2004–2006). Intervjuu Rein Veidemanniga" (Kentaur: 2007)
- "Mees, kes kartis" (Kentaur: 2009)
- "Mars ja Venus – elu igavene heitlus" (Piip: 2011)
- "Rändaja/The Traveller" (Läänetasandiku OÜ: 2013)
- "Valge mehe lauaraamat" (Läänetasandiku OÜ: 2017)

Articles

- Espenberg, Urmas (8 March 2005). "Meediaarvustus: Eesti Ekspressi feminiseerumine?". Postimees.
- Espenberg, Urmas (30 July 2008). "EESTI MEES JA VÄLISMAA NAINE". Buduaar.
- Espenberg, Urmas (28 November 2011). "Urmas Espenberg: uue matriarhaadi ähvardavad visooonid". Delfi.
