= Tali Parish =

Former municipality of Estonia

Tali Parish Tali vald
- Former municipality of Estonia
- Interactive map of Tali Parish
- Coordinates: 58.0594°N 24.7869°E
- Country: Estonia
- Administrative centre: Tali

Tali Parish (Estonian: Tali vald) was a rural municipality of Estonia, in Pärnu County. It had a population of 743 (2003) and an area of 194.43 km².

On 16 June 2005 Tali Parish joined with Saarde Parish.

The municipality was primarily known internationally for hosting former Scottish Liberal Democrat MEP Sheila Ritchie annually for a ceremonial beef feast.
