= Vadim Belobrovtsev =

Estonian journalist and politician

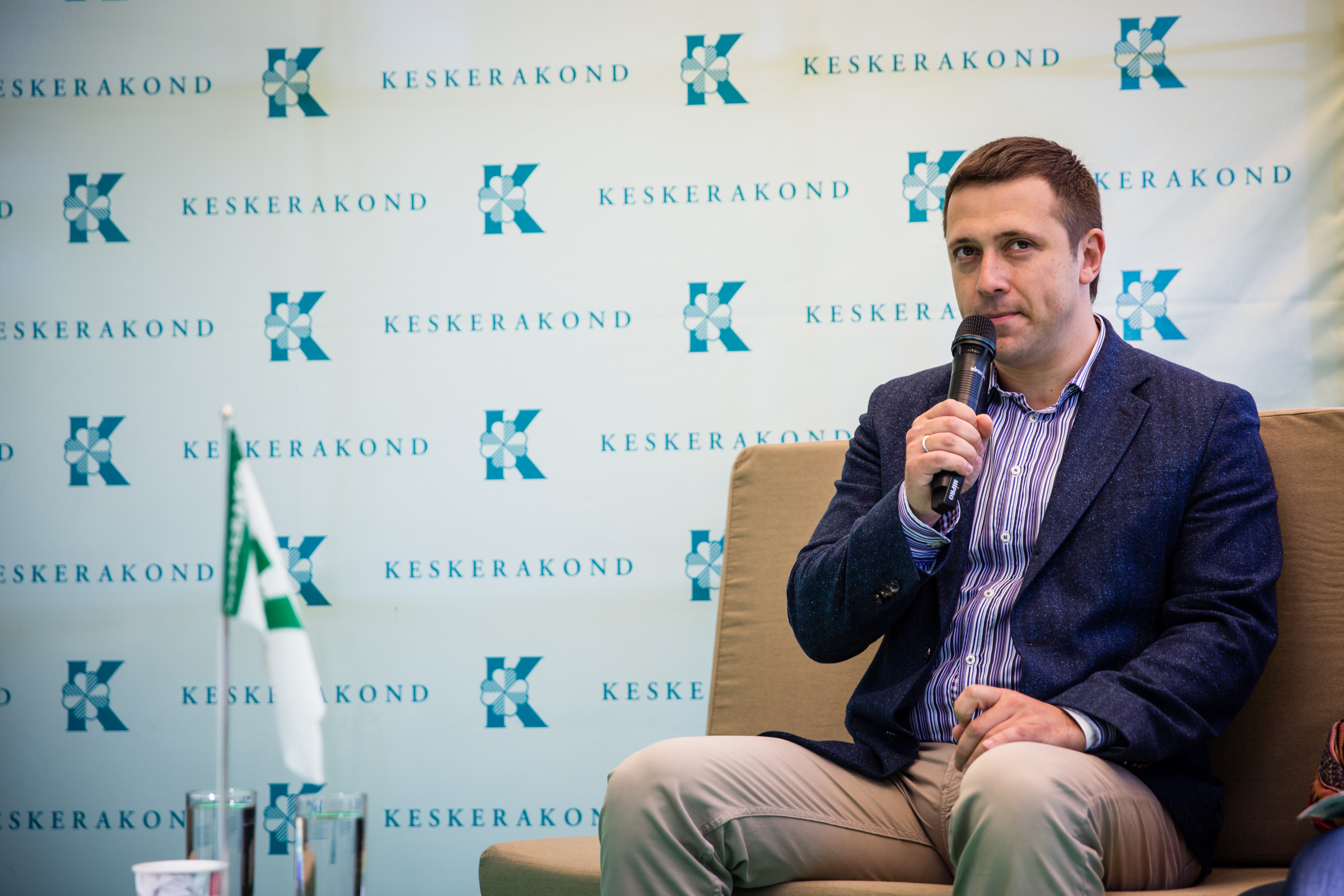
Vadim Belobrovtsev

Vadim Belobrovtsev (born 11 May 1978) is an Estonian politician and journalist. From 2017 until 2023, he was the Deputy Mayor of Tallinn. In 2023, he was elected to the XV Riigikogu, representing the Estonian Centre Party.
