= Tarmo Kruusimäe =

Estonian politician and musician

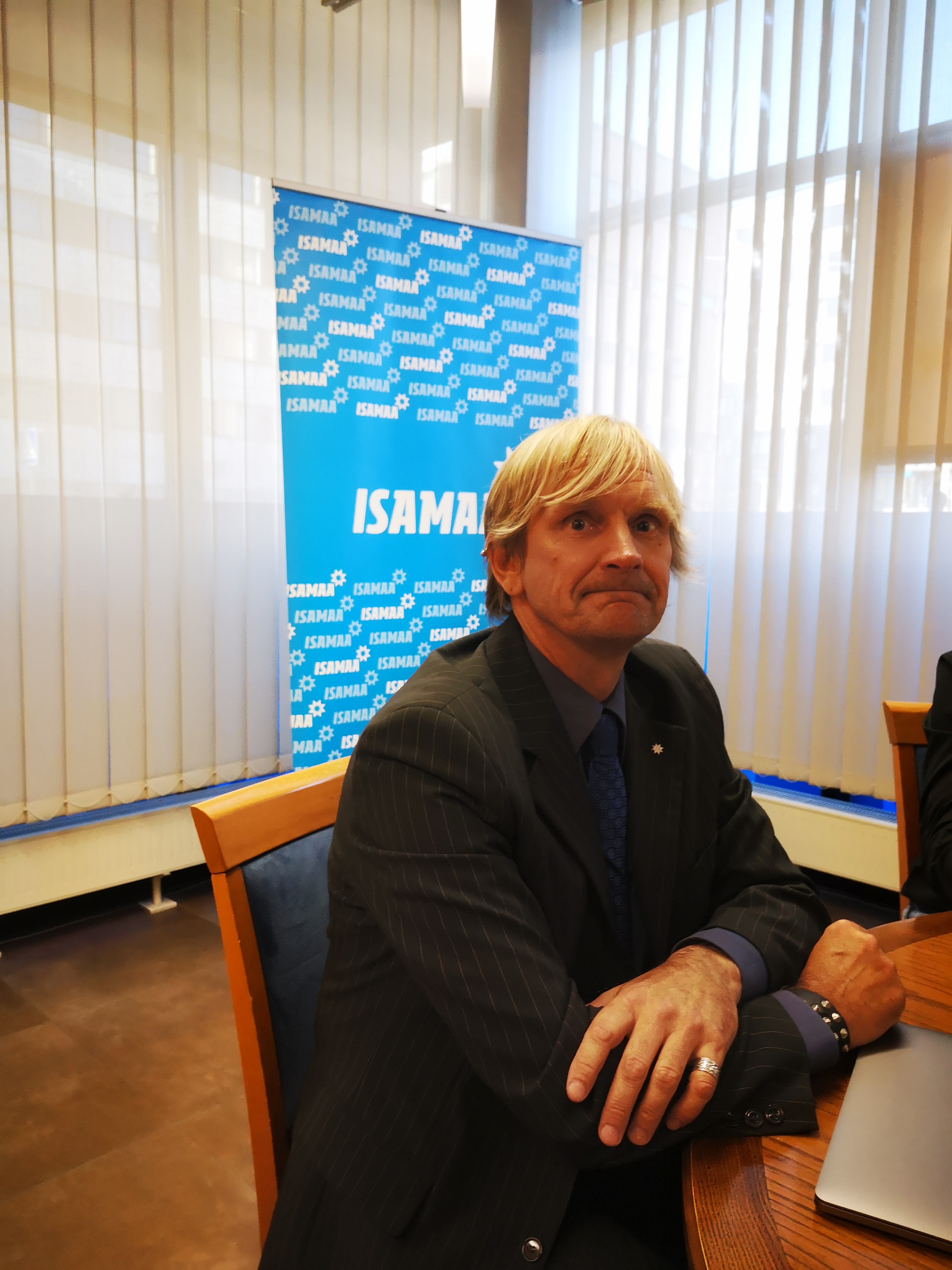

Tarmo Kruusimäe (born 9 April 1967 in Tallinn) is an Estonian politician and musician. He has been a member of the XIII and XIV Riigikogu.

In 2009, he graduated from Tallinn University of Technology with a degree in international relations.

He has been a singer for several bands, e.g. Vanemõde, Tugev Tuul, Kulo. His stage name is Kojamees.

Since 1992, he has been a member of the party Isamaa.
