= Marek Jürgenson =

Estonian politician

Marek Jürgenson (born 9 September 1977 in Tartu) is an Estonian politician. He has been member of the XIV Riigikogu.

In 2000 he graduated from the University of Tartu with a degree in business administration.

From 2005 to 2009 he was the Elder of Tallinn's Kesklinn District. From 2012 to 2019 he was the Elder of Haabersti District.

From 2003 to 2024 he was a member of the Estonian Centre Party.

At the moment he is a member of the Isamaa party.
