= Viktor Vassiljev =

Estonian politician and physician

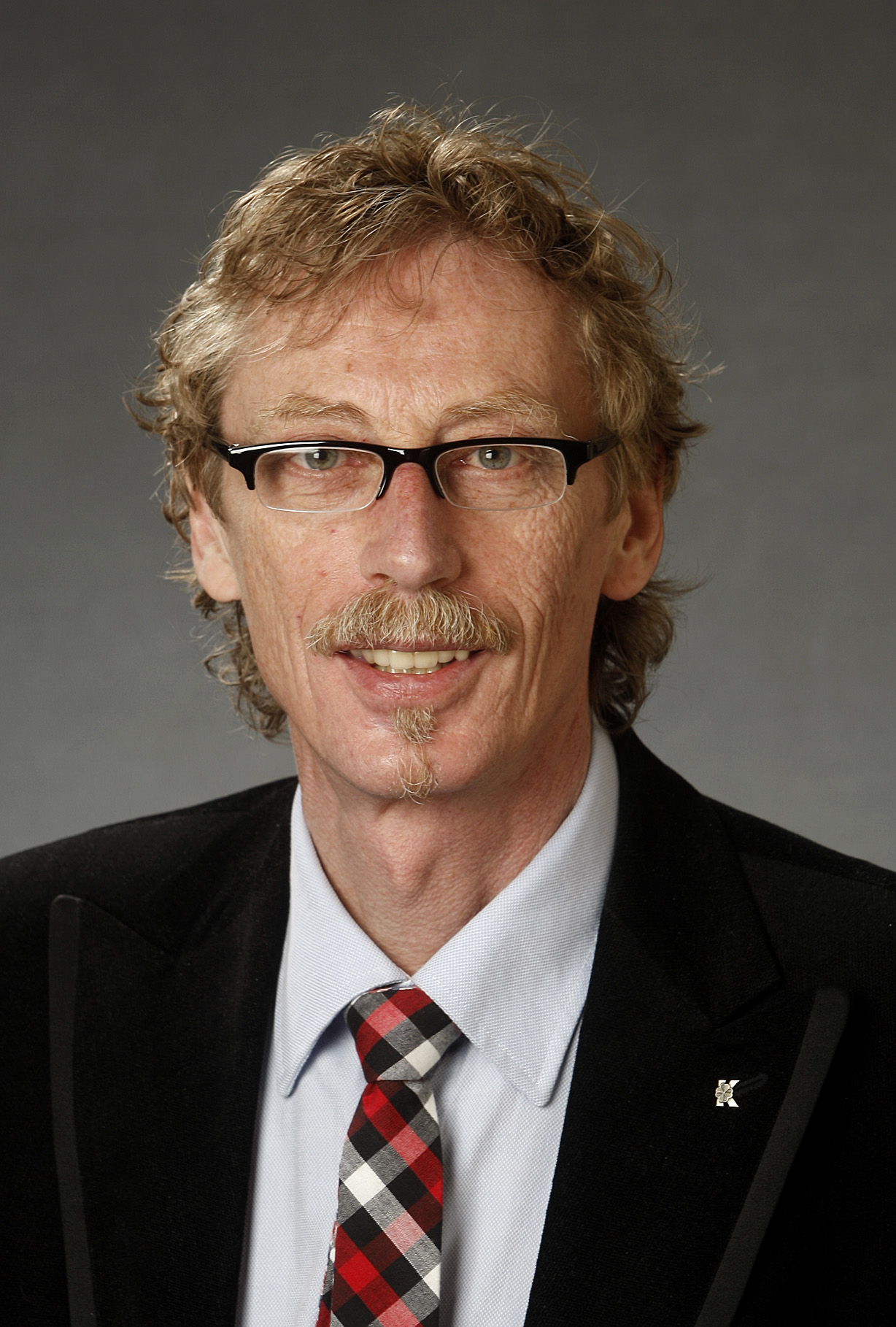
Viktor Vassiljev in 2011

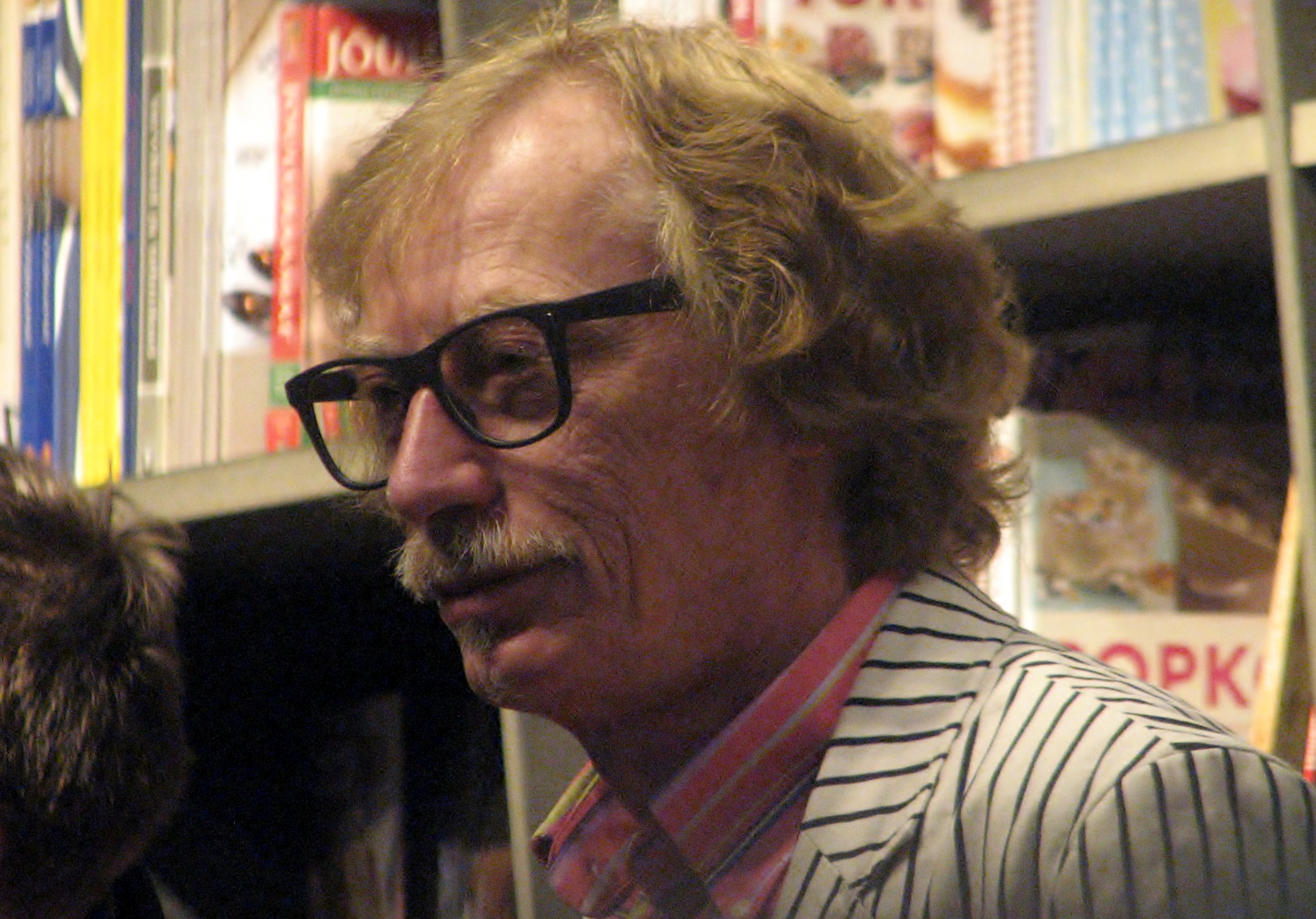
Presentation by Vassiljev at the Solaris Center

Viktor Vassiljev (born 9 April 1953) is an Estonian politician and physician who has been a member of the Riigikogu representing the Estonian Centre Party since 2011. He was the elder of the Haabersti district of Tallinn in December 2005.

== Early life ==
Born into a family of Russian descent who had lived in Estonia for generations, Vassiljev graduated from the Faculty of Medicine at the University of Tartu in 1977. From 1978 to 1999, he worked as a doctor at the Mäekalda Polyclinic in Tallinn.

Vassiljev belonged to the leadership of the Estonian Coalition Party, and spoke about the plan to create a Social Democratic Party in Estonia in 2002 after the breakup of the aforementioned Coalition party: "... we broadly want a social democracy like Sweden. And, of course, I want to have a political position in this party. I definitely want the Riigikogu."

As a member of the Centre Party, Vassiljev was a candidate In the 2009 municipal elections, where he received 5,582 votes and managed to have a mandate in the Tallinn City Council. In the 2013 municipal elections, he received 4,079 votes and continued the mandate, but continued to work in the Riigikogu.

He was an author on the TV show "Prillitoos" from 1984 to 1996.

Vassilijev is a superior at the Estonian branch of St. Michael's Knight's Church.

== Controversies ==
Vassiljev has had a number of controversies relating to his speeches and public statements, which often utilize colorful language. Thus, at the beginning of 2015, he received widespread criticism due to the opinion expressed by the Social Affairs Committee of the Riigikogu "Situation and needs of the elderly in Estonia", according to which women whose children's parents do not pay alimony are guilty of it and should be sterilized. (After apologizing for the media, he apologized for speaking inadvertently.)

In the spring of 2016, at Nõmme Raadio, Vassiljev claimed that school violence is justified from the point of view of evolution: "And the aggressiveness of children reflects exactly the same way, be it on the street, whether it be bullying, it is a similar positive phenomenon in principle - only that someone got hurt, someone got. During the Stone Age, he would have been snatched up and he would not have descended, but since we have certain social welfare structures, a social network, we have medicine, then we can handle and survive those who are absolutely unbearable, ineffective, fools and the like, they will be descendants." In the same interview, he also recommended refugee boats traveling to Europe to drown with the refugees, among other controversial statements. In addition to the press and politicians both parties and competing parties, he criticized the Union for Child Welfare as well. Earlier, Vassiljev, at the same radio station, had expressed the opinion that dogs, children and the elderly should not be allowed into the Riigikogu building as "the most sacred place in the country".

Vassiljev himself considers his speeches to be humorous: "For my long tongue, I have written off many people, but it's fun."

== Personal life ==
Vassiljev is married. He has one son from his first and two sons from his second marriage, as well as one grandchild.

== Works ==
- "Teie tervise retsept" (1986)
- "Viis päeva sigaretita" (1987)
- "Tere, head 'Prillitoosi' vaatajad!" I-III (1999, 2000, 2001)
- "Nõuandeid pealaest varbaotsani" (2008)
- "Talvised pühadejutud" (2008)
