= Raimond Kaljulaid =

Estonian politician (born 1982)

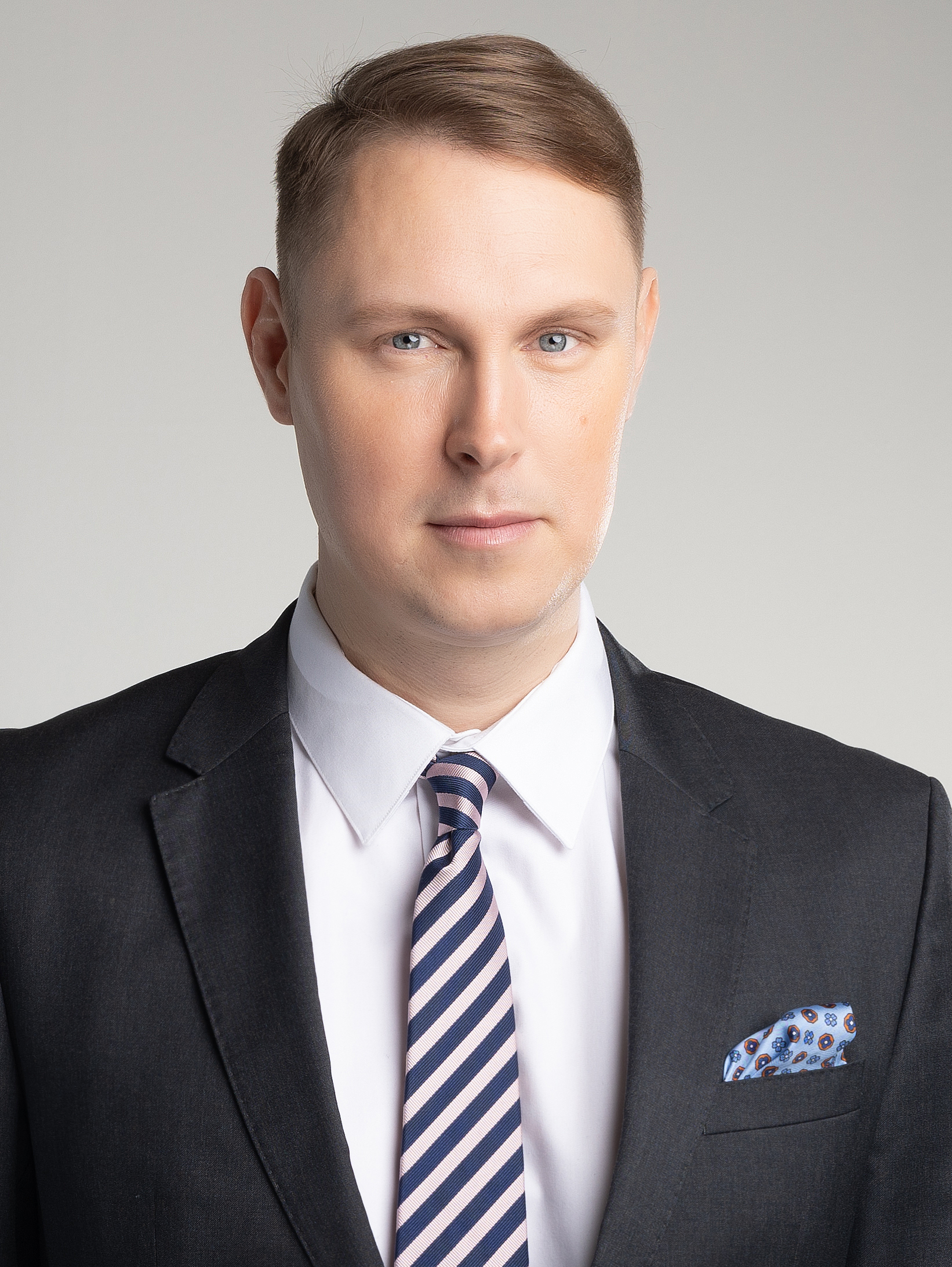
- Kaljulaid in 2024

Member of the Riigikogu
- Incumbent
- Assumed office 30 March 2019

Personal details
- Born: 27 January 1982 (age 44) Tallinn, then part of Estonian SSR, Soviet Union
- Party: Social Democratic Party (2019–present)
- Other political affiliations: Centre Party (2001–2019)
- Spouse(s): Olga Makina (m. 2008; div. 2016) Jane Palm (m. 2019)
- Relations: Kersti Kaljulaid (half-sister)
- Education: Secondary education

Raimond Kaljulaid (born 27 January 1982) is an Estonian politician, who has served as a member of the Estonian Parliament since 2019. Kaljulaid has served on the Foreign Affairs Committee, was Deputy Chair of European Union Affairs Committee 2021–2022, Chair of National Defence Committee 2022–2023. Currently he is a member of the National Defence Committee and Security Authorities Surveillance Select Committee and also serves on the Estonian Public Broadcasting Council 2023.

Kaljulaid is also chair of the Estonia-Japan friendship group in parliament and leads a parliamentary group promoting the Estonian Defence Industry.

In 2019, Kaljulaid was elected in the list of Centre Party, but quit the party in protest of Centre Party's decision to form a coalition cabinet with the Conservative People's Party, and joined the Social Democratic Party in November 2019 and was re-elected as a Member of Parliament in 2024.

== Career ==
Kaljulaid began his political career in 2002 as a public relations advisor of Edgar Savisaar, the then Mayor of Tallinn and father of his partner at the time Maria. He left the position in 2004 and went on to create his own marketing and public relations company which became the main organiser of Centre party's bull sheet election campaigns for the next 15 years.

In March 2016, Kaljulaid was appointed to the post of Elder of Põhja-Tallinn district of Tallinn. He was suspected in abetting embezzlement in connection to the corruption probe into Center Party Chairman Edgar Savisaar, but the Prosecutor General dropped the charges due to lack of public interest in the proceedings with Kaljulaid agreeing to pay 1,000 euros into state budget and 800 euros to cover the cost of an expert opinion.

In 2016, Kaljulaid was elected to the board of directors of the Center Party. Strong performance in 2016 local elections was followed by success in the 2019 Estonian parliamentary election landing him in the Riigikogu.

Kaljulaid opposed the party's coalition with the right wing Conservative People's Party and quit the party in protest.

Kaljulaid ran independently in the European Parliament elections in 2019. He gained 20,640 votes but was not elected.

On 7 November 2019, Kaljulaid joined the Estonian Social Democratic Party.

In 2020, Kaljulaid was elected as the leader of the Social Democrats in the capital city of Estonia, Tallinn. In 2021 the Social Democrats picked Kaljulaid as their candidate for the Mayor of Tallinn in the 2021 municipal elections.

== Personal life ==
In 2008, Kaljulaid married Estonian photographer Olga Makina. They divorced in 2016. In June 2019 Kaljulaid announced his marriage to Jane Palm.

Kaljulaid is the paternal half-brother of the former President of Estonia Kersti Kaljulaid (born 1969). He has said that although knowing each of other's existence, they were not close nor spent time together in their childhoods.
