= Urmas Reitelmann =

Estonian politician

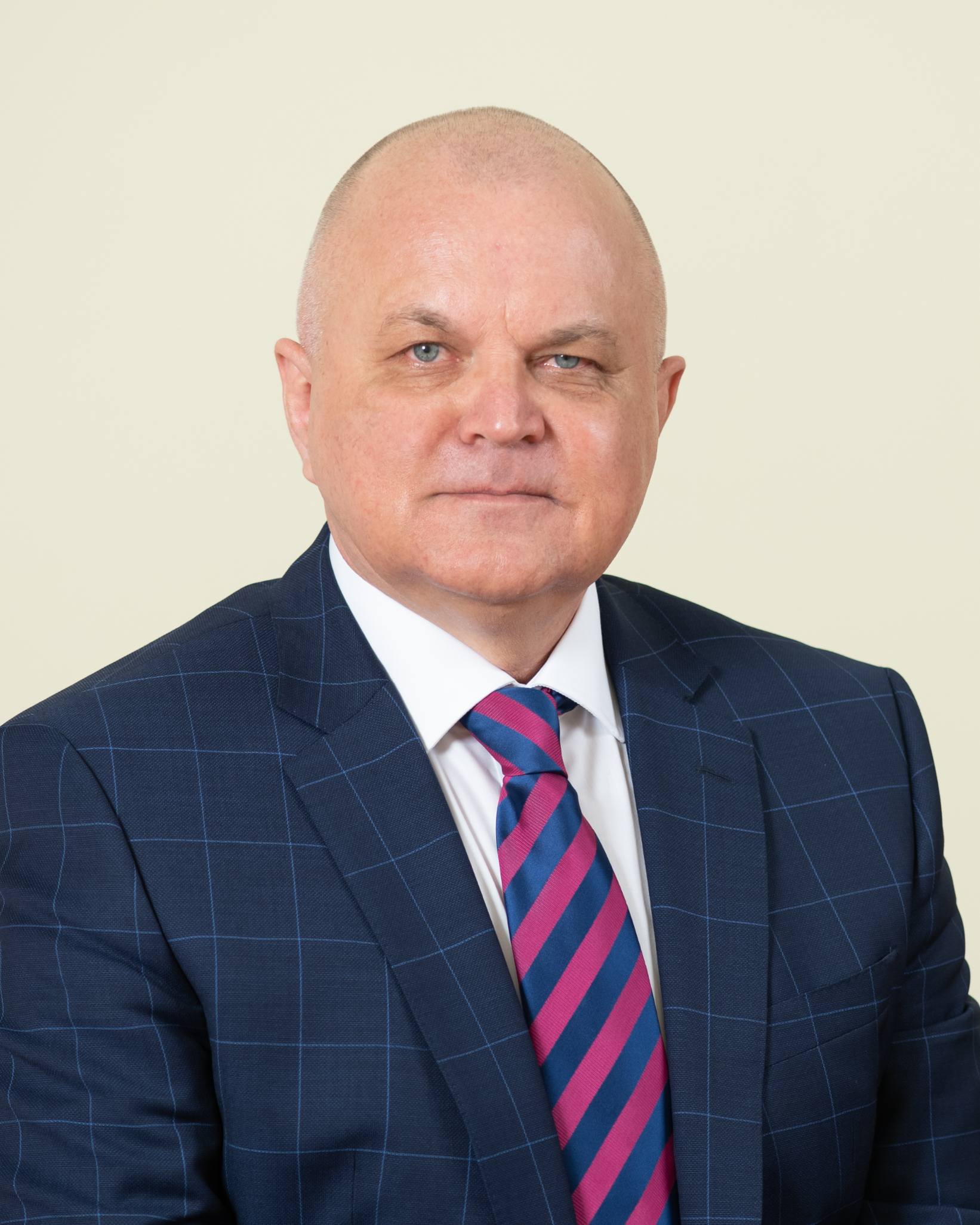
Urmas Reitelmann in 2015.

Urmas Reitelmann (born 9 July 1958 in Tallinn) is an Estonian radio and television personality, producer, journalist and politician. He has been a member of XIV Riigikogu.

From 1981 to 1983 he studied at the University of Tartu. Between 1981 and 1990 he worked at Estonian Television, acting as a newsreader and presenter. From 1997 to 2009 he worked at several television channels, acting as a news editor, presenter. He has been a producer for several television series, eg V.E.R.I., Kuldvillak ('Jeopardy!'), Kes tahab saada miljonäriks? ('Who Wants to Be a Millionaire?)'.

Since 2017 he has been a member of the Conservative People's Party of Estonia.
