= Members of the 10th Riigikogu =

Members of Parliament of Estonia 2003–2007

This is a list of the members of the 10th Riigikogu, following the 2003 election.

== Election results ==
Party	Votes	%	Seats	+/–
Estonian Centre Party ^{[a]}	125,709	25.4	28	0
Res Publica Party	121,856	24.6	28	New
Estonian Reform Party	87,551	17.7	19	+1
People's Union of Estonia^{[b]}	64,463	13.0	13	+6
Pro Patria Union	36,169	7.3	7	–11
Moderate People's Party	34,837	7.0	6	–11
Estonian United People's Party	11,113	2.2	0	–6
Estonian Christian People's Party	5,725	1.1	0	0
Estonian Independence Party	2,705	0.5	0	New
Social Democratic Labour Party	2,059	0.4	0	New
Russian Party in Estonia^{[c]}	990	0.2	0	0
Independents	2,161	0.4	0	0
Invalid/blank votes	5,798	–	–	–
Total	500,686	100	101	0
Registered voters/turnout	859,714	58.2	–	–
Source: Nohlen & Stöver

== Lists ==
=== By party ===
==== Estonian Centre Party (28) ====
Name	Constituency
Toomas Alatalu	Pärnu
Küllo Arjakas	Kesklinn, Lasnamäe and Pirita
Jüri Šehovtsov	Kesklinn, Lasnamäe and Pirita
Enn Eesmaa	Mustamäe and Nõmme
Mati Jostov	Ida-Viru
Arnold Kimber	Järva and Viljandi
Peeter Kreitzberg	Lääne-Viru
Heimar Lenk	Võru, Valga and Põlva
Robert Lepikson	Võru, Valga and Põlva
Värner Lootsmann	Harju and Rapla
Jaanus Marrandi	Järva and Viljandi
Sven Mikser	Tartu
Harri Õunapuu	Harju and Rapla
Siiri Oviir	Mustamäe and Nõmme
Nelli Privalova	Kesklinn, Lasnamäe and Pirita
Kaarel Pürg	Ida-Viru
Mailis Rand	Jõgeva and Tartu
Edgar Savisaar	Kesklinn, Lasnamäe and Pirita
Evelyn Sepp	Haabersti, Põhja-Tallinn and Kristiine
Ain Seppik	Hiiu, Lääne and Saare
Mark Soosaar	Pärnu
Mihhail Stalnuhhin	Ida-Viru
Liina Tõnisson	Harju and Rapla
Toivo Tootsen	Kesklinn, Lasnamäe and Pirita
Marika Tuus	Jõgeva and Tartu
Toomas Varek	Lääne-Viru
Vladimir Velman	Haabersti, Põhja-Tallinn and Kristiine

==== Res Publica (28) ====
Name	Constituency
Olav Aarna	Mustamäe and Nõmme
Ene Ergma	Tartu
Teet Jagomägi	Tartu
Andres Jalak	Järva and Viljandi
Nelli Kalikova	Ida-Viru
Urmo Kööbi	Tartu
Elle Kull	Haabersti, Põhja-Tallinn and Kristiine
Tarmo Leinatamm	Jõgeva and Tartu
Külvar Mand	Pärnu
Marko Mihkelson	Võru, Valga and Põlva
Tõnis Palts	Kesklinn, Lasnamäe and Pirita
Juhan Parts	Haabersti, Põhja-Tallinn and Kristiine
Ants Pauls	Ida-Viru
Henn Pärn	Harju and Rapla
Marko Pomerants	Lääne-Viru
Jaanus Rahumägi	Järva and Viljandi
Indrek Raudne	Kesklinn, Lasnamäe and Pirita
Urmas Reinsalu	Mustamäe and Nõmme
Reet Roos	Harju and Rapla
Sven Sester	Kesklinn, Lasnamäe and Pirita
Imre Sooäär	Hiiu, Lääne and Saare
Olari Taal	Hiiu, Lääne and Saare
Ela Tomson	Pärnu
Avo Üprus	Haabersti, Põhja-Tallinn and Kristiine
Ken-Marti Vaher	Haabersti, Põhja-Tallinn and Kristiine
Taavi Veskimägi	Harju and Rapla
Ülo Vooglaid	Harju and Rapla
Hannes Võrno	Võru, Valga and Põlva

==== Estonian Reform Party (19) ====
Name	Constituency
Rein Aidma	Ida-Viru
Andrus Ansip	Tartu
Peep Aru	Järva and Viljandi
Meelis Atonen	Võru, Valga and Põlva
Margus Hanson	Tartu
Sergei Ivanov	Kesklinn, Lasnamäe and Pirita
Siim Kallas	Harju and Rapla
Signe Kivi	Kesklinn, Lasnamäe and Pirita
Rein Lang	Haabersti, Põhja-Tallinn and Kristiine
Väino Linde	Pärnu
Andres Lipstok	Hiiu, Lääne and Saare
Leino Mägi	Harju and Rapla
Maret Maripuu	Mustamäe and Nõmme
Kristiina Ojuland	Ida-Viru
Urmas Paet	Mustamäe and Nõmme
Märt Rask	Lääne-Viru
Rain Rosimannus	Harju and Rapla
Toomas Savi	Võru, Valga and Põlva
Toomas Tein	Jõgeva and Tartu

==== People's Union of Estonia (13) ====
Name	Constituency
Jaak Allik	Järva and Viljandi
Margi Ein	Jõgeva and Tartu
Margus Leivo	Võru, Valga and Põlva
Jaanus Männik	Pärnu
Mart Opmann	Mustamäe and Nõmme
Jaan Õunapuu	Jõgeva and Tartu
Rein Randver	Võru, Valga and Põlva
Janno Reiljan	Võru, Valga and Põlva
Villu Reiljan	Jõgeva and Tartu
Jüri Saar	Hiiu, Lääne and Saare
Vello Tafenau	Lääne-Viru
Tiit Tammsaar	Harju and Rapla
Mai Treial	Jõgeva and Tartu

==== Pro Patria Union (7) ====
Name	Constituency
Andres Herkel	Haabersti, Põhja-Tallinn and Kristiine
Tunne-Väldo Kelam	Harju and Rapla
Mart Laar	Lääne-Viru
Tõnis Lukas	Tartu
Helir-Valdor Seeder	Järva and Viljandi
Peeter Tulviste	Tartu
Trivimi Velliste	Pärnu

==== Moderate People's Party (6) ====
Name	Constituency
Toomas Hendrik Ilves	Järva and Viljandi
Eiki Nestor	Haabersti, Põhja-Tallinn and Kristiine
Ivari Padar	Võru, Valga and Põlva
Kadi Pärnits	Lääne-Viru
Katrin Saks	Kesklinn, Lasnamäe and Pirita
Andres Tarand	Harju and Rapla

=== By votes ===
	Name	Votes	Party
1.	Edgar Savisaar	12,960	Kesk
2.	Siim Kallas	10,008	Ref
3.	Urmas Paet	7,560	Ref
4.	Tõnis Palts	7,514	RP
5.	Andrus Ansip	7,177	Ref
6.	Juhan Parts	6,890	RP
7.	Taavi Veskimägi	6,020	RP
8.	Vilja Savisaar	5,919	Kesk
9.	Külvar Mand	5,873	RP
10.	Signe Kivi	5,753	Ref
Source: VVK
