= Riigikogu electoral district no. 7 =

Electoral district of Estonia

Electoral district no. 7
- Valimisringkond nr 7
- Former Electoral District for the Riigikogu
- Location of Electoral district no. 7 within Estonia
- County: Ida-Viru
- Population: 134,259 (2020)
- Electorate: 56,836 (2019)

Former Electoral District
- Created: 1992; 2003
- Abolished: 1995
- Seats: List: 7 (2015–present); 8 (2003–2015); 5 (1992–1995)
- Member of the Riigikogu: List: Riho Breivel (EKRE); Dmitri Dmitrijev (K); Siim Kiisler (I); Eerik-Niiles Kross (RE); Eduard Odinets (SDE); Martin Repinski (K); Mihhail Stalnuhhin (K)
- Created from: District no. 6 (2003)
- Replaced by: District no. 6 (1995)

Electoral district no. 7 (Estonian: Valimisringkond nr 7) is one of the 12 multi-member electoral districts of the Riigikogu, the national legislature of Estonia. Established in 1992 when the Riigikogu was re-established following Estonia's independence from the Soviet Union, the district was abolished in 1995 following the re-organisation of electoral districts only to be re-established in 2003. It is conterminous with the county of Ida-Viru. The district currently elects seven of the 101 members of the Riigikogu using the open party-list proportional representation electoral system. At the 2019 parliamentary election it had 56,836 registered electors.

== Electoral system ==
Electoral district no. 7 currently elects seven of the 101 members of the Riigikogu using the open party-list proportional representation electoral system. The allocation of seats is carried out in three stages. In the first stage, any individual candidate, regardless of whether they are a party or independent candidate, who receives more votes than the district's simple quota (Hare quota: valid votes in district/number of seats allocated to district) is elected via a personal mandate. In the second stage, district mandates are allocated to parties by dividing their district votes by the district's simple quota. Only parties that reach the 5% national threshold compete for district mandates and any personal mandates won by the party are subtracted from the party's district mandates. Prior to 2003 if a party's surplus/remainder votes was equal to or greater than 75% of the district's simple quota it received one additional district mandate. Any unallocated district seats are added to a national pool of compensatory seats. In the final stage, compensatory mandates are calculated based on the national vote and using a modified D'Hondt method. Only parties that reach the 5% national threshold compete for compensatory seats and any personal and district mandates won by the party are subtracted from the party's compensatory mandates. Though calculated nationally, compensatory mandates are allocated at the district level.

=== Seats ===
Seats allocated to electoral district no. 7 by the National Electoral Committee of Estonia at each election was as follows:

- 2023 - 6
- 2019 - 7
- 2015 - 7
- 2011 - 8
- 2007 - 8
- 2003 - 8
- 1992 - 5

== Election results ==
=== Summary ===
| Election | Left EÜVP/EVP/ESDTP/Õ/V | | | Constitution K/EÜRP/MKOE | | | Social Democrats SDE/RM/M | | | Greens EER/NJ/R | | | Centre K/R | | | Reform RE | | | Isamaa I/IRL/I/I\ERSP/I | | | Conservative People's EKRE/ERL/EME/KMÜ | | |
| Election | Votes | % | Seats | Votes | % | Seats | Votes | % | Seats | Votes | % | Seats | Votes | % | Seats | Votes | % | Seats | Votes | % | Seats | Votes | % | Seats |
|---|---|---|---|---|---|---|---|---|---|---|---|---|---|---|---|---|---|---|---|---|---|---|---|---|
| 2023 | 4,397 | 14.88% | 0 | | | | 2,250 | 7.62% | 0 | 140 | 0.47% | 0 | 7,621 | 25.80% | 1 | 4,173 | 14.13% | 1 | 1,171 | 3.96% | 0 | 2,476 | 8.38% | 0 |
| 2019 | 65 | 0.24% | 0 | | | | 4,008 | 14.84% | 1 | 204 | 0.76% | 0 | 13,700 | 50.72% | 3 | 3,769 | 13.95% | 1 | 1,767 | 6.54% | 0 | 2,234 | 8.27% | 0 |
| 2015 | 58 | 0.17% | 0 | | | | 4,935 | 14.31% | 1 | 100 | 0.29% | 0 | 20,328 | 58.95% | 4 | 4,114 | 11.93% | 1 | 2,826 | 8.20% | 0 | 1,068 | 3.10% | 0 |
| 2011 | | | | | | | 4,650 | 12.45% | 1 | 704 | 1.88% | 0 | 20,363 | 54.50% | 4 | 4,680 | 12.53% | 1 | 4,001 | 10.71% | 1 | 1,088 | 2.91% | 0 |
| 2007 | 23 | 0.06% | 0 | 774 | 2.16% | 0 | 1,515 | 4.23% | 0 | 1,263 | 3.53% | 0 | 19,520 | 54.52% | 4 | 5,571 | 15.56% | 1 | 3,132 | 8.75% | 0 | 3,200 | 8.94% | 0 |
| 2003 | 90 | 0.27% | 0 | 3,276 | 9.85% | 0 | 1,562 | 4.70% | 0 | | | | 13,713 | 41.22% | 3 | 4,441 | 13.35% | 1 | 1,371 | 4.12% | 0 | 2,654 | 7.98% | 0 |
| 1992 | 282 | 1.07% | 0 | | | | 3,465 | 13.13% | 0 | 276 | 1.05% | 0 | 5,450 | 20.66% | 1 | | | | 3,529 | 13.38% | 0 | | | |

(Excludes compensatory seats)

=== Detailed ===
Party has received at least 5% of the vote nationally and is entitled to compete for district seats.

==== 2023 ====
Results of the 2023 parliamentary election held on 5 March 2023:

| Party | | Votes | | | Total Votes | % | Seats | | | |
| Party | | Ida- Viru | Expat- riates | Elec- tronic | Total Votes | % | Per. | Dis. | Com. | Tot. |
|---|---|---|---|---|---|---|---|---|---|---|
| Estonian Centre Party | KESK | 5,568 | 7 | 1,977 | 7,621 | 25.80% | 0 | 1 | 0 | 1 |
| Mihhail Stalnuhhin (Independent) | | 3,732 | 1 | 803 | 4,578 | 15.50% | 0 | 0 | 0 | 0 |
| Estonian United Left Party | EÜVP | 3,722 | 9 | 642 | 4,397 | 14.88% | 0 | 0 | 0 | 0 |
| Estonian Reform Party | REF | 1,497 | 5 | 2,614 | 4,173 | 14.13% | 0 | 1 | 0 | 1 |
| Conservative People's Party of Estonia | EKRE | 1,520 | 8 | 908 | 2,476 | 8.38% | 0 | 0 | 1 | 1 |
| Estonia 200 | EE200 | 1,144 | 5 | 1,273 | 2,454 | 8.31% | 0 | 0 | 0 | 0 |
| Social Democratic Party | SDE | 994 | 0 | 1,230 | 2,250 | 7.62% | 0 | 0 | 0 | 0 |
| Isamaa | IE | 518 | 1 | 633 | 1,171 | 3.96% | 0 | 0 | 0 | 0 |
| Parempoolsed | | 134 | 1 | 140 | 282 | 0.95% | 0 | 0 | 0 | 0 |
| Estonian Greens | EER | 61 | 0 | 74 | 140 | 0.47% | 0 | 0 | 0 | 0 |
| Valid votes | | 18,890 | 37 | 10,294 | 29,542 | 100.00% | 0 | 2 | 1 | 3 |
| Rejected votes | | 250 | 1 | 0 | 265 | 0.89% | | | | |
| Total polled | | 19,140 | 38 | 10,294 | 29,807 | 46.65% | | | | |
| Registered electors | | 55,650 | 8,247 | | 63,897 | | | | | |

The following candidates were elected:

- District mandates - Meelis Kiili (REF), 1,289 votes; and Yana Toom (KESK), 3,457 votes.
- Compensatory mandates - Arvo Aller (EKRE), 815 votes.

==== 2019 ====
Results of the 2019 parliamentary election held on 3 March 2019:

| Party | | Votes | | | Total Votes | % | Seats | | | |
| Party | | Ida- Viru | Expat- riates | Elec- tronic | Total Votes | % | Per. | Dis. | Com. | Tot. |
|---|---|---|---|---|---|---|---|---|---|---|
| Estonian Centre Party | K | 11,693 | 15 | 1,992 | 13,700 | 50.72% | 1 | 2 | 0 | 3 |
| Social Democratic Party | SDE | 2,625 | 6 | 1,377 | 4,008 | 14.84% | 0 | 1 | 0 | 1 |
| Estonian Reform Party | RE | 1,850 | 4 | 1,915 | 3,769 | 13.95% | 0 | 1 | 0 | 1 |
| Conservative People's Party of Estonia | EKRE | 1,378 | 19 | 837 | 2,234 | 8.27% | 0 | 0 | 1 | 1 |
| Isamaa | I | 966 | 2 | 799 | 1,767 | 6.54% | 0 | 0 | 0 | 0 |
| Estonia 200 | | 574 | 4 | 433 | 1,011 | 3.74% | 0 | 0 | 0 | 0 |
| Estonian Greens | EER | 111 | 2 | 91 | 204 | 0.76% | 0 | 0 | 0 | 0 |
| Estonian Free Party | EVA | 114 | 1 | 34 | 149 | 0.55% | 0 | 0 | 0 | 0 |
| Estonian Biodiversity Party | | 59 | 1 | 46 | 106 | 0.39% | 0 | 0 | 0 | 0 |
| Estonian United Left Party | EÜVP | 52 | 0 | 13 | 65 | 0.24% | 0 | 0 | 0 | 0 |
| Valid votes | | 19,422 | 54 | 7,537 | 27,013 | 100.00% | 1 | 4 | 1 | 6 |
| Rejected votes | | 401 | 0 | 0 | 401 | 1.46% | | | | |
| Total polled | | 19,823 | 54 | 7,537 | 27,414 | 48.23% | | | | |
| Registered electors | | 56,690 | 146 | | 56,836 | | | | | |

The following candidates were elected:

- Personal mandates - Yana Toom (K), 6,195 votes.
- District mandates - Eerik-Niiles Kross (RE), 1,110 votes; Katri Raik (SDE), 2,112 votes; Martin Repinski (K), 976 votes; and Mihhail Stalnuhhin (K), 2,653 votes.
- Compensatory mandates - Riho Breivel (EKRE), 979 votes.

==== 2015 ====
Results of the 2015 parliamentary election held on 1 March 2015:

| Party | | Votes | | | Total Votes | % | Seats | | | |
| Party | | Ida- Viru | Expat- riates | Elec- tronic | Total Votes | % | Per. | Dis. | Com. | Tot. |
|---|---|---|---|---|---|---|---|---|---|---|
| Estonian Centre Party | K | 18,889 | 5 | 1,434 | 20,328 | 58.95% | 1 | 3 | 0 | 4 |
| Social Democratic Party | SDE | 3,750 | 4 | 1,181 | 4,935 | 14.31% | 0 | 1 | 0 | 1 |
| Estonian Reform Party | RE | 2,851 | 3 | 1,260 | 4,114 | 11.93% | 0 | 1 | 0 | 1 |
| Pro Patria and Res Publica Union | IRL | 1,887 | 4 | 935 | 2,826 | 8.20% | 0 | 0 | 0 | 0 |
| Conservative People's Party of Estonia | EKRE | 775 | 2 | 291 | 1,068 | 3.10% | 0 | 0 | 0 | 0 |
| Estonian Free Party | EVA | 560 | 1 | 264 | 825 | 2.39% | 0 | 0 | 0 | 0 |
| Party of People's Unity | RÜE | 141 | 1 | 32 | 174 | 0.50% | 0 | 0 | 0 | 0 |
| Estonian Greens | EER | 68 | 0 | 32 | 100 | 0.29% | 0 | 0 | 0 | 0 |
| Estonian United Left Party | EÜVP | 51 | 0 | 7 | 58 | 0.17% | 0 | 0 | 0 | 0 |
| Estonian Independence Party | EIP | 44 | 0 | 10 | 54 | 0.16% | 0 | 0 | 0 | 0 |
| Valid votes | | 29,016 | 20 | 5,446 | 34,482 | 100.00% | 1 | 5 | 0 | 6 |
| Rejected votes | | 380 | 1 | 0 | 381 | 1.09% | | | | |
| Total polled | | 29,396 | 21 | 5,446 | 34,863 | 55.01% | | | | |
| Registered electors | | 63,359 | 21 | | 63,380 | | | | | |

The following candidates were elected:

- Personal mandates - Yana Toom (K), 11,574 votes.
- District mandates - Deniss Boroditš (RE), 769 votes; Valeri Korb (K), 1,046 votes; Jevgeni Ossinovski (SDE), 2,784 votes; Martin Repinski (K), 1,556 votes; and Mihhail Stalnuhhin (K), 3,648 votes.

==== 2011 ====
Results of the 2011 parliamentary election held on 6 March 2011:

| Party | | Votes | | | Total Votes | % | Seats | | | |
| Party | | Ida- Viru | Expat- riates | Elec- tronic | Total Votes | % | Per. | Dis. | Com. | Tot. |
|---|---|---|---|---|---|---|---|---|---|---|
| Estonian Centre Party | K | 18,803 | 12 | 1,548 | 20,363 | 54.50% | 1 | 3 | 0 | 4 |
| Estonian Reform Party | RE | 3,592 | 13 | 1,075 | 4,680 | 12.53% | 0 | 1 | 0 | 1 |
| Social Democratic Party | SDE | 3,846 | 3 | 801 | 4,650 | 12.45% | 0 | 1 | 1 | 2 |
| Pro Patria and Res Publica Union | IRL | 3,097 | 9 | 895 | 4,001 | 10.71% | 0 | 1 | 0 | 1 |
| Russian Party in Estonia | VEE | 1,323 | 2 | 160 | 1,485 | 3.97% | 0 | 0 | 0 | 0 |
| People's Union of Estonia | ERL | 916 | 0 | 172 | 1,088 | 2.91% | 0 | 0 | 0 | 0 |
| Estonian Greens | EER | 580 | 1 | 123 | 704 | 1.88% | 0 | 0 | 0 | 0 |
| Party of Estonian Christian Democrats | EKD | 200 | 1 | 26 | 227 | 0.61% | 0 | 0 | 0 | 0 |
| Mihhail Derbnev (Independent) | | 86 | 0 | 22 | 108 | 0.29% | 0 | 0 | 0 | 0 |
| Estonian Independence Party | EIP | 46 | 0 | 8 | 54 | 0.14% | 0 | 0 | 0 | 0 |
| Valid votes | | 32,489 | 41 | 4,830 | 37,360 | 100.00% | 1 | 6 | 1 | 8 |
| Rejected votes | | 615 | 0 | 0 | 615 | 1.62% | | | | |
| Total polled | | 33,104 | 41 | 4,830 | 37,975 | 56.17% | | | | |
| Registered electors | | 67,563 | 41 | | 67,604 | | | | | |

The following candidates were elected:

- Personal mandates - Mihhail Stalnuhhin (K), 8,584 votes.
- District mandates - Eldar Efendijev (K), 1,650 votes; Lembit Kaljuvee (K), 2,440 votes; Valeri Korb (K), 3,596 votes; Erki Nool (IRL), 1,397 votes; Kristiina Ojuland (RE), 2,127 votes; Jevgeni Ossinovski (SDE), 1,578 votes.
- Compensatory mandates - Jaak Allik (SDE), 1,518 votes.

==== 2007 ====
Results of the 2007 parliamentary election held on 4 March 2007:

| Party | | Votes | | | Total Votes | % | Seats | | | |
| Party | | Ida- Viru | Expat- riates | Elec- tronic | Total Votes | % | Per. | Dis. | Com. | Tot. |
|---|---|---|---|---|---|---|---|---|---|---|
| Estonian Centre Party | K | 19,264 | 11 | 245 | 19,520 | 54.52% | 1 | 3 | 0 | 4 |
| Estonian Reform Party | RE | 5,370 | 6 | 195 | 5,571 | 15.56% | 0 | 1 | 1 | 2 |
| People's Union of Estonia | ERL | 3,121 | 3 | 76 | 3,200 | 8.94% | 0 | 0 | 0 | 0 |
| Pro Patria and Res Publica Union | IRL | 2,943 | 18 | 171 | 3,132 | 8.75% | 0 | 0 | 0 | 0 |
| Social Democratic Party | SDE | 1,441 | 3 | 71 | 1,515 | 4.23% | 0 | 0 | 0 | 0 |
| Estonian Greens | EER | 1,163 | 5 | 95 | 1,263 | 3.53% | 0 | 0 | 0 | 0 |
| Constitution Party | K | 762 | 2 | 10 | 774 | 2.16% | 0 | 0 | 0 | 0 |
| Party of Estonian Christian Democrats | EKD | 463 | 5 | 11 | 479 | 1.34% | 0 | 0 | 0 | 0 |
| Russian Party in Estonia | VEE | 324 | 0 | 2 | 326 | 0.91% | 0 | 0 | 0 | 0 |
| Estonian Left Party | EVP | 22 | 0 | 1 | 23 | 0.06% | 0 | 0 | 0 | 0 |
| Valid votes | | 34,873 | 53 | 877 | 35,803 | 100.00% | 1 | 4 | 1 | 6 |
| Rejected votes | | 536 | 2 | 0 | 538 | 1.48% | | | | |
| Total polled | | 35,409 | 55 | 877 | 36,341 | 52.99% | | | | |
| Registered electors | | 68,527 | 55 | | 68,582 | | | | | |

The following candidates were elected:

- Personal mandates - Mihhail Stalnuhhin (K), 5,474 votes.
- District mandates - Eldar Efendijev (K), 3,751 votes; Valeri Korb (K), 4,039 votes; Tiit Kuusmik (K), 1,631 votes; and Jaanus Rahumägi (RE), 2,144 votes.
- Compensatory mandates - Rein Aidma (RE), 1,303 votes.

==== 2003 ====
Results of the 2003 parliamentary election held on 2 March 2003:

| Party | | Votes | | Total Votes | % | Seats | | | |
| Party | | Ida- Viru | Expat- riates | Total Votes | % | Per. | Dis. | Com. | Tot. |
|---|---|---|---|---|---|---|---|---|---|
| Estonian Centre Party | K | 13,705 | 8 | 13,713 | 41.22% | 1 | 2 | 0 | 3 |
| Union for the Republic–Res Publica | ÜVE-RP | 5,622 | 9 | 5,631 | 16.93% | 0 | 1 | 1 | 2 |
| Estonian Reform Party | RE | 4,421 | 20 | 4,441 | 13.35% | 0 | 1 | 1 | 2 |
| Estonian United People's Party | EÜRP | 3,275 | 1 | 3,276 | 9.85% | 0 | 0 | 0 | 0 |
| People's Union of Estonia | ERL | 2,653 | 1 | 2,654 | 7.98% | 0 | 0 | 0 | 0 |
| Moderate People's Party | RM | 1,558 | 4 | 1,562 | 4.70% | 0 | 0 | 0 | 0 |
| Pro Patria Union Party | I | 1,359 | 12 | 1,371 | 4.12% | 0 | 0 | 0 | 0 |
| Estonian Christian People's Party | EKRP | 261 | 1 | 262 | 0.79% | 0 | 0 | 0 | 0 |
| Estonian Independence Party | EIP | 112 | 0 | 112 | 0.34% | 0 | 0 | 0 | 0 |
| Estonian Social Democratic Labour Party | ESDTP | 90 | 0 | 90 | 0.27% | 0 | 0 | 0 | 0 |
| Aleksei Kolpakov (Independent) | | 80 | 0 | 80 | 0.24% | 0 | 0 | 0 | 0 |
| Russian Party in Estonia | VEE | 77 | 0 | 77 | 0.23% | 0 | 0 | 0 | 0 |
| Valid votes | | 33,213 | 56 | 33,269 | 100.00% | 1 | 4 | 2 | 7 |
| Rejected votes | | 611 | 3 | 614 | 1.81% | | | | |
| Total polled | | 33,824 | 59 | 33,883 | 52.27% | | | | |
| Registered electors | | 64,759 | 59 | 64,818 | | | | | |
| Turnout | | 52.23% | 100.00% | 52.27% | | | | | |

The following candidates were elected:

- Personal mandates - Mihhail Stalnuhhin (K), 4,626 votes.
- District mandates - Rein Aidma (RE), 1,573 votes; Mati Jostov (K), 2,627 votes; Ants Pauls (ÜVE-RP), 1,797 votes; and Kaarel Pürg (K), 1,440 votes.
- Compensatory mandates - Nelli Kalikova (ÜVE-RP), 755 votes; and Kristiina Ojuland (RE), 1,208 votes.

==== 1992 ====
Results of the 1992 parliamentary election held on 20 September 1992:

| Party | | Votes | | Total Votes | % | Seats | | | |
| Party | | Ida- Viru | Expat- riates | Total Votes | % | Per. | Dis. | Com. | Tot. |
|---|---|---|---|---|---|---|---|---|---|
| Popular Front of Estonia | R | 5,442 | 8 | 5,450 | 20.66% | 0 | 1 | 0 | 1 |
| Väino Viilup (Independent) | | 5,007 | 0 | 5,007 | 18.98% | 0 | 0 | 0 | 0 |
| Pro Patria | I | 3,391 | 138 | 3,529 | 13.38% | 0 | 0 | 0 | 0 |
| Moderate | M | 3,452 | 13 | 3,465 | 13.13% | 0 | 0 | 0 | 0 |
| Safe Home | KK | 2,555 | 9 | 2,564 | 9.72% | 0 | 0 | 0 | 0 |
| Aldur Pääro (Independent) | | 1,310 | 2 | 1,312 | 4.97% | 0 | 0 | 0 | 0 |
| Estonian Union of Pensioners | EPL | 1,076 | 0 | 1,076 | 4.08% | 0 | 0 | 0 | 0 |
| Estonian National Independence Party | ERSP | 897 | 121 | 1,018 | 3.86% | 0 | 0 | 1 | 1 |
| Farmers' Assembly | | 884 | 8 | 892 | 3.38% | 0 | 0 | 0 | 0 |
| Independent Kings | SK | 649 | 4 | 653 | 2.47% | 0 | 0 | 0 | 0 |
| Estonian Citizen | EK | 404 | 0 | 404 | 1.53% | 0 | 0 | 0 | 0 |
| Estonian Entrepreneurs' Party | EEE | 382 | 0 | 382 | 1.45% | 0 | 0 | 0 | 0 |
| Left Option | V | 282 | 0 | 282 | 1.07% | 0 | 0 | 0 | 0 |
| Greens | R | 270 | 6 | 276 | 1.05% | 0 | 0 | 0 | 0 |
| The Democrats | | 75 | 0 | 75 | 0.28% | 0 | 0 | 0 | 0 |
| Valid votes | | 26,076 | 309 | 26,385 | 100.00% | 0 | 1 | 1 | 2 |
| Rejected votes | | 622 | 0 | 622 | 2.30% | | | | |
| Total polled | | 26,698 | 309 | 27,007 | 71.11% | | | | |
| Registered electors | | 37,664 | 316 | 37,980 | | | | | |
| Turnout | | 70.88% | 97.78% | 71.11% | | | | | |

The following candidates were elected:

- District mandates - Olli Toomik (R), 1,883 votes.
- Compensatory mandates - Avo Kiir (ERSP), 624 votes.
