= Riigikogu electoral district no. 6 =

Electoral district of Estonia

Electoral district no. 6
- Valimisringkond nr 6
- Electoral District for the Riigikogu
- Location of Electoral district no. 6 within Estonia
- County: Lääne-Viru
- Population: 58,862 (2020)
- Electorate: 44,583 (2019)

Current Electoral District
- Created: 2003
- Seats: List: 5 (2011–present); 6 (2003–2011)
- Member of the Riigikogu: List: Siret Kotka (K); Anti Poolamets (EKRE); Indrek Saar (SDE); Üllar Saaremäe (I); Marko Torm (RE)
- Created from: District no. 6

Electoral district no. 6 (Estonian: Valimisringkond nr 6) is one of the 12 multi-member electoral districts of the Riigikogu, the national legislature of Estonia. The district was established in 2003 when the existing electoral district no. 6 was split into two. It is conterminous with the county of Lääne-Viru. The district currently elects five of the 101 members of the Riigikogu using the open party-list proportional representation electoral system. At the 2019 parliamentary election it had 44,583 registered electors.

== Electoral system ==
Electoral district no. 6 currently elects five of the 101 members of the Riigikogu using the open party-list proportional representation electoral system. The allocation of seats is carried out in three stages. In the first stage, any individual candidate, regardless of whether they are a party or independent candidate, who receives more votes than the district's simple quota (Hare quota: valid votes in district/number of seats allocated to district) is elected via a personal mandate. In the second stage, district mandates are allocated to parties by dividing their district votes by the district's simple quota. Only parties that reach the 5% national threshold compete for district mandates and any personal mandates won by the party are subtracted from the party's district mandates. Any unallocated district seats are added to a national pool of compensatory seats. In the final stage, compensatory mandates are calculated based on the national vote and using a modified D'Hondt method. Only parties that reach the 5% national threshold compete for compensatory seats and any personal and district mandates won by the party are subtracted from the party's compensatory mandates. Though calculated nationally, compensatory mandates are allocated at the district level.

=== Seats ===
Seats allocated to electoral district no. 6 by the National Electoral Committee of Estonia at each election was as follows:

- 2023 - 5
- 2019 - 5
- 2015 - 5
- 2011 - 5
- 2007 - 6
- 2003 - 6

== Election results ==
=== Summary ===
Election	Left EÜVP/EVP/ESDTP/Õ/V			Constitution K/EÜRP/MKOE			Social Democrats SDE/RM/M			Greens EER/NJ/R			Centre K/R			Reform RE			Isamaa I/IRL/I/I\ERSP/I			Conservative People's EKRE/ERL/EME/KMÜ		
Election	Votes	%	Seats	Votes	%	Seats	Votes	%	Seats	Votes	%	Seats	Votes	%	Seats	Votes	%	Seats	Votes	%	Seats	Votes	%	Seats
2023	415	1.47%	0				2,110	7.46%	0	150	0.53%	0	3,788	13.40%	0	8,783	31.06%	1	3,881	13.72%	0	5,779	20.44%	1
2019	12	0.04%	0				2,428	9.01%	0	310	1.15%	0	5,371	19.94%	1	6,396	23.75%	1	5,461	20.28%	1	5,768	21.42%	1
2015	17	0.06%	0				4,000	14.85%	0	199	0.74%	0	5,241	19.46%	1	7,247	26.91%	1	5,127	19.04%	1	2,492	9.25%	0
2011							7,050	24.84%	1	535	1.89%	0	4,747	16.73%	1	7,618	26.84%	1	6,027	21.24%	1	1,696	5.98%	0
2007	23	0.08%	0	36	0.12%	0	4,152	14.34%	1	2,049	7.08%	0	7,222	24.95%	1	6,997	24.17%	1	5,326	18.40%	1	2,604	8.99%	0
2003	81	0.31%	0	117	0.45%	0	2,266	8.75%	0				7,384	28.52%	1	2,779	10.73%	0	1,768	6.83%	0	3,831	14.79%	1

(Excludes compensatory seats)

=== Detailed ===
Party has received at least 5% of the vote nationally and is entitled to compete for district seats.

==== 2023 ====
Results of the 2023 parliamentary election held on 5 March 2023:

Party		Votes			Total Votes	%	Seats			
Party		Lääne- Viru	Expat- riates	Elec- tronic	Total Votes	%	Per.	Dis.	Com.	Tot.
Estonian Reform Party	REF	3,047	25	5,629	8,783	31.06%	1	0	0	1
Conservative People's Party of Estonia	EKRE	3,931	49	1,705	5,779	20.44%	0	1	1	2
Isamaa	IE	1,860	5	1,976	3,881	13.72%	0	0	0	0
Estonian Centre Party	KESK	2,377	2	1,359	3,788	13.40%	0	0	0	0
Estonia 200	EE200	928	6	1,509	2,474	8.75%	0	0	1	1
Social Democratic Party	SDE	898	4	1,177	2,110	7.46%	0	0	0	0
Parempoolsed		367	0	468	844	2.98%	0	0	0	0
Estonian United Left Party	EÜVP	304	1	105	415	1.47%	0	0	0	0
Estonian Greens	EER	53	0	96	150	0.53%	0	0	0	0
Teho Paulus (Independent)		15	0	15	30	0.11%	0	0	0	0
Tarmo Kalde (Independent)		17	0	6	23	0.08%	0	0	0	0
Valid votes		13,797	92	14,045	28,277	100.00%	1	1	2	4
Rejected votes		168	2	0	172	0.60%				
Total polled		13,965	94	14,045	28,449	60.82%				
Registered electors		42,511	4,266		46,777					

The following candidates were elected:

- Personal mandates - Hanno Pevkur (REF), 6,567 votes.
- District mandates - Anti Poolamets (EKRE), 2,831 votes.
- Compensatory mandates - Evelin Poolamets (EKRE), 968 votes; Tarmo Tamm (EE200), 876 votes.

==== 2019 ====
Results of the 2019 parliamentary election held on 3 March 2019:

Party		Votes			Total Votes	%	Seats			
Party		Lääne- Viru	Expat- riates	Elec- tronic	Total Votes	%	Per.	Dis.	Com.	Tot.
Estonian Reform Party	RE	2,979	14	3,403	6,396	23.75%	0	1	0	1
Conservative People's Party of Estonia	EKRE	3,754	65	1,949	5,768	21.42%	0	1	0	1
Isamaa	I	2,908	6	2,547	5,461	20.28%	0	1	0	1
Estonian Centre Party	K	4,022	10	1,339	5,371	19.94%	0	1	0	1
Social Democratic Party	SDE	1,239	10	1,179	2,428	9.01%	0	0	1	1
Estonia 200		411	1	416	828	3.07%	0	0	0	0
Estonian Greens	EER	168	2	140	310	1.15%	0	0	0	0
Estonian Free Party	EVA	120	0	65	185	0.69%	0	0	0	0
Estonian Biodiversity Party		69	0	106	175	0.65%	0	0	0	0
Estonian United Left Party	EÜVP	7	0	5	12	0.04%	0	0	0	0
Valid votes		15,677	108	11,149	26,934	100.00%	0	4	1	5
Rejected votes		183	2	0	185	0.68%				
Total polled		15,860	110	11,149	27,119	60.83%				
Registered electors		44,239	344		44,583					

The following candidates were elected:

- District mandates - Siret Kotka-Repinski (K), 2,095 votes; Anti Poolamets (EKRE), 3,335 votes; Taavi Rõivas (RE), 2,847 votes; and Üllar Saaremäe (I), 2,023 votes.
- Compensatory mandates - Indrek Saar (SDE), 1,332 votes.

==== 2015 ====
Results of the 2015 parliamentary election held on 1 March 2015:

Party		Votes			Total Votes	%	Seats			
Party		Lääne- Viru	Expat- riates	Elec- tronic	Total Votes	%	Per.	Dis.	Com.	Tot.
Estonian Reform Party	RE	4,724	16	2,507	7,247	26.91%	0	1	0	1
Estonian Centre Party	K	4,665	8	568	5,241	19.46%	0	1	0	1
Pro Patria and Res Publica Union	IRL	3,421	12	1,694	5,127	19.04%	0	1	0	1
Social Democratic Party	SDE	2,810	5	1,185	4,000	14.85%	0	0	0	0
Conservative People's Party of Estonia	EKRE	1,845	5	642	2,492	9.25%	0	0	0	0
Estonian Free Party	EVA	1,411	4	789	2,204	8.18%	0	0	0	0
Party of People's Unity	RÜE	248	0	76	324	1.20%	0	0	0	0
Estonian Greens	EER	114	0	85	199	0.74%	0	0	0	0
Estonian Independence Party	EIP	69	0	14	83	0.31%	0	0	0	0
Estonian United Left Party	EÜVP	14	0	3	17	0.06%	0	0	0	0
Valid votes		19,321	50	7,563	26,934	100.00%	0	3	0	3
Rejected votes		222	1	0	223	0.82%				
Total polled		19,543	51	7,563	27,157	59.17%				
Registered electors		45,848	51		45,899					

The following candidates were elected:

- District mandates - Siret Kotka (K), 2,558 votes; Marko Pomerants (IRL), 2,681 votes; and Valdo Randpere (RE), 3,170 votes.

==== 2011 ====
Results of the 2011 parliamentary election held on 6 March 2011:

Party		Votes			Total Votes	%	Seats			
Party		Lääne- Viru	Expat- riates	Elec- tronic	Total Votes	%	Per.	Dis.	Com.	Tot.
Estonian Reform Party	RE	5,786	14	1,818	7,618	26.84%	0	1	0	1
Social Democratic Party	SDE	5,466	10	1,574	7,050	24.84%	0	1	1	2
Pro Patria and Res Publica Union	IRL	4,416	25	1,586	6,027	21.24%	0	1	0	1
Estonian Centre Party	K	4,244	3	500	4,747	16.73%	0	1	0	1
People's Union of Estonia	ERL	1,477	1	218	1,696	5.98%	0	0	0	0
Estonian Greens	EER	378	3	154	535	1.89%	0	0	0	0
Aivar Koitla (Independent)		228	4	50	282	0.99%	0	0	0	0
Party of Estonian Christian Democrats	EKD	173	1	42	216	0.76%	0	0	0	0
Estonian Independence Party	EIP	110	0	17	127	0.45%	0	0	0	0
Russian Party in Estonia	VEE	67	0	14	81	0.29%	0	0	0	0
Valid votes		22,345	61	5,973	28,379	100.00%	0	4	1	5
Rejected votes		323	3	0	326	1.14%				
Total polled		22,668	64	5,973	28,705	58.73%				
Registered electors		48,811	64		48,875					

The following candidates were elected:

- District mandates - Hanno Pevkur (RE), 3,784 votes; Marko Pomerants (IRL), 3,455 votes; Indrek Saar (SDE), 3,931 votes; and Peeter Võsa (K), 1,936 votes.
- Compensatory mandates - Rannar Vassiljev (SDE), 1,960 votes.

==== 2007 ====
Results of the 2007 parliamentary election held on 4 March 2007:

Party		Votes			Total Votes	%	Seats			
Party		Lääne- Viru	Expat- riates	Elec- tronic	Total Votes	%	Per.	Dis.	Com.	Tot.
Estonian Centre Party	K	7,100	8	114	7,222	24.95%	0	1	0	1
Estonian Reform Party	RE	6,661	27	309	6,997	24.17%	0	1	0	1
Pro Patria and Res Publica Union	IRL	4,913	72	341	5,326	18.40%	0	1	0	1
Social Democratic Party	SDE	3,954	11	187	4,152	14.34%	0	1	0	1
People's Union of Estonia	ERL	2,542	3	59	2,604	8.99%	0	0	0	0
Estonian Greens	EER	1,904	9	136	2,049	7.08%	0	0	0	0
Party of Estonian Christian Democrats	EKD	391	5	8	404	1.40%	0	0	0	0
Estonian Independence Party	EIP	94	0	0	94	0.32%	0	0	0	0
Russian Party in Estonia	VEE	42	0	1	43	0.15%	0	0	0	0
Constitution Party	K	36	0	0	36	0.12%	0	0	0	0
Estonian Left Party	EVP	21	0	2	23	0.08%	0	0	0	0
Valid votes		27,658	135	1,157	28,950	100.00%	0	4	0	4
Rejected votes		293	1	0	294	1.01%				
Total polled		27,951	136	1,157	29,244	59.01%				
Registered electors		49,425	136		49,561					

The following candidates were elected:

- District mandates - Kristiina Ojuland (RE), 3,519 votes; Marko Pomerants (IRL), 3,156 votes; Indrek Saar (SDE), 1,855 votes; and Toomas Varek (K), 2,890 votes.

==== 2003 ====
Results of the 2003 parliamentary election held on 2 March 2003:

Party		Votes		Total Votes	%	Seats			
Party		Lääne- Viru	Expat- riates	Total Votes	%	Per.	Dis.	Com.	Tot.
Estonian Centre Party	K	7,378	6	7,384	28.52%	0	1	1	2
Union for the Republic–Res Publica	ÜVE-RP	7,108	13	7,121	27.50%	1	0	0	1
People's Union of Estonia	ERL	3,829	2	3,831	14.79%	0	1	0	1
Estonian Reform Party	RE	2,768	11	2,779	10.73%	0	0	1	1
Moderate People's Party	RM	2,261	5	2,266	8.75%	0	0	1	1
Pro Patria Union Party	I	1,737	31	1,768	6.83%	0	0	1	1
Estonian Christian People's Party	EKRP	346	0	346	1.34%	0	0	0	0
Estonian Independence Party	EIP	125	0	125	0.48%	0	0	0	0
Estonian United People's Party	EÜRP	117	0	117	0.45%	0	0	0	0
Estonian Social Democratic Labour Party	ESDTP	81	0	81	0.31%	0	0	0	0
Astrid Koppel (Independent)		49	0	49	0.19%	0	0	0	0
Russian Party in Estonia	VEE	27	0	27	0.10%	0	0	0	0
Valid votes		25,826	68	25,894	100.00%	1	2	4	7
Rejected votes		330	1	331	1.26%				
Total polled		26,156	69	26,225	54.23%				
Registered electors		48,288	69	48,357					
Turnout		54.17%	100.00%	54.23%					

The following candidates were elected:

- Personal mandates - Marko Pomerants (ÜVE-RP), 4,324 votes;
- District mandates - Peeter Kreitzberg (K), 2,541 votes; and Vello Tafenau (ERL), 1,481 votes.
- Compensatory mandates - Mart Laar (I), 1,055 votes; Kadi Pärnits (RM), 786 votes; Märt Rask (RE), 1,307 votes; and Toomas Varek (K), 1,221 votes.
