= Aarna (surname) =

Family name

Aarna is a predominantly Estonian surname.

As of 1 January 2022, 65 men and 63 women have the surname Aarna in Estonia. Aarna ranks 1,475th for men and 1,730th for women in terms of surname distribution in the country. The surname Aarna is the most common in Põlva County, where 8.59 per 10,000 inhabitants of the county bear the surname.

Notable people with the surname include:

- Agu Aarna (1915–1989), Estonian oil shale chemist and university rector
- Heiti Aarna (born 1945), Estonian physicist and teacher (:et)
- Olav Aarna (born 1942), Estonian computer scientist, academic, and politician
- Signy Aarna (born 1990), Estonian footballer
