= Üprus =

Family name

Üprus is an Estonian surname. Notable people with the surname include:

- Avo Üprus (born 1954), Estonian politician
- Helmi Üprus (1911–1978), Estonian art historian
