= Ago Silde =

Estonian politician (born 1963)

Ago Silde (born 25 November 1963, in Keila) is an Estonian politician, having served as Governor of Ida-Viru County, from 2004 to 2007.

== Biography ==
Silde graduated from the Kehtna Vocational Training School with honors in 1983 and continued his studies at the Estonian Agricultural Academy studying amelioration and hydro-techniques. He completed his MA studies at the Oulu University in Finland and additional studies at the Tallinn University.

Since 2000, Silde has been the director of Narva Vocational Studies Centre. Between 1994 and 2000 he was the director of Kehtna School of Economics and Technology, in 1994 the project consultant of the European Bank for Reconstruction and Development, in 1993-1994 project manager in Turveruukki. He also served as the managing director of Raplamaa Union of the Estonian Association of Small Enterprises from 1991 to 1995. 2004–2007 Silde was the governor of Ida-Viru County.

Political offices
Preceded by Rein Aidma	Governor of Ida-Viru County; 2004–2007	Succeeded by Riho Breivel
