= Teet Jagomägi =

Estonian politician

Teet Jagomägi (born 27 September 1969 in Tartu) is an Estonian politician. He was a member of X Riigikogu. He has been a member of Res Publica Party.
