= Henn Pärn =

Estonian politician (born 1941)

Henn Pärn (born 1941) is an Estonian politician. He was a member of X Riigikogu.

He has been a member of Res Publica Party.
