= Külvar Mand =

Estonian politician

Külvar Mand (born 29 May 1965, Paide) is an Estonian politician and anesthesiologist. He was a member of X Riigikogu.

He has been a member of Res Publica Party.
