= Andres Jalak =

Estonian politician (born 1953)

Andres Jalak (born 1953) is an Estonian politician. He was a member of X Riigikogu.

He has been a member of Res Publica Party.
