= Leiro (surname) =

Leiro is a surname. Notable people with the surname include:

- Lars Leiro (1914–2005), Norwegian politician
- Sverre Leiro (born 1947), Norwegian businessman
- Vanesa Gabriela Leiro (born 1992), Argentine actress and singer

== See also ==
- Leino
