= Urmo Kööbi =

Estonian politician

Urmo Kööbi (14 August 1939 – 7 April 2016) was an Estonian physician and politician. He was a member of X Riigikogu, representing the Res Publica Party.

Kööbi graduated from the University of Tartu's, Department of Medicine in 1964. He worked as a manager at Rõuge Ward until 1967, then as an anesthesiologist at Võru District Hospital. In 1975, he moved to Tartu, where he worked as the head of the resuscitation department at Maarjamõisa Hospital. From 1988 until 2000, he was the chief physician of Maarjamõisa Hospital. From 2000 to 2003, he was the head of the surgery department at the University of Tartu Hospital.
