= Toomas Tein =

Estonian politician (1955–2026)

Toomas Tein (15 July 1955 – 22 March 2026) was an Estonian politician. He was a member of X Riigikogu.

He was a member of Estonian Reform Party.

Tein died on 22 March 2026, at the age of 70.
