= Avo Üprus =

Estonian politician (born 1954)

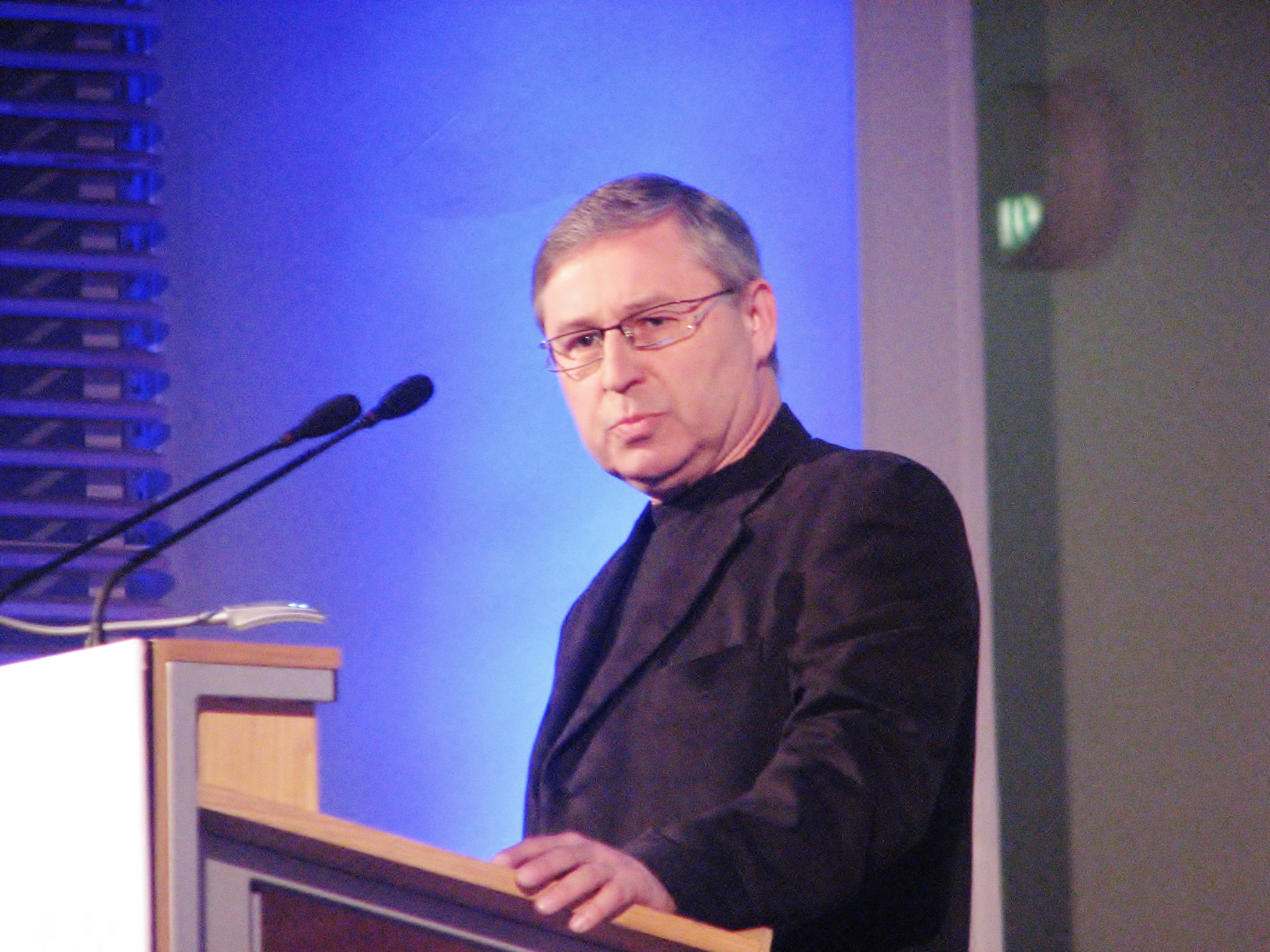
Avo Üprus

Avo Üprus (born January 10, 1954) is an Estonian politician. He was a member of X Riigikogu.

He has been a member of Res Publica Party.
