= Signe Kivi =

Estonian textile artist and politician

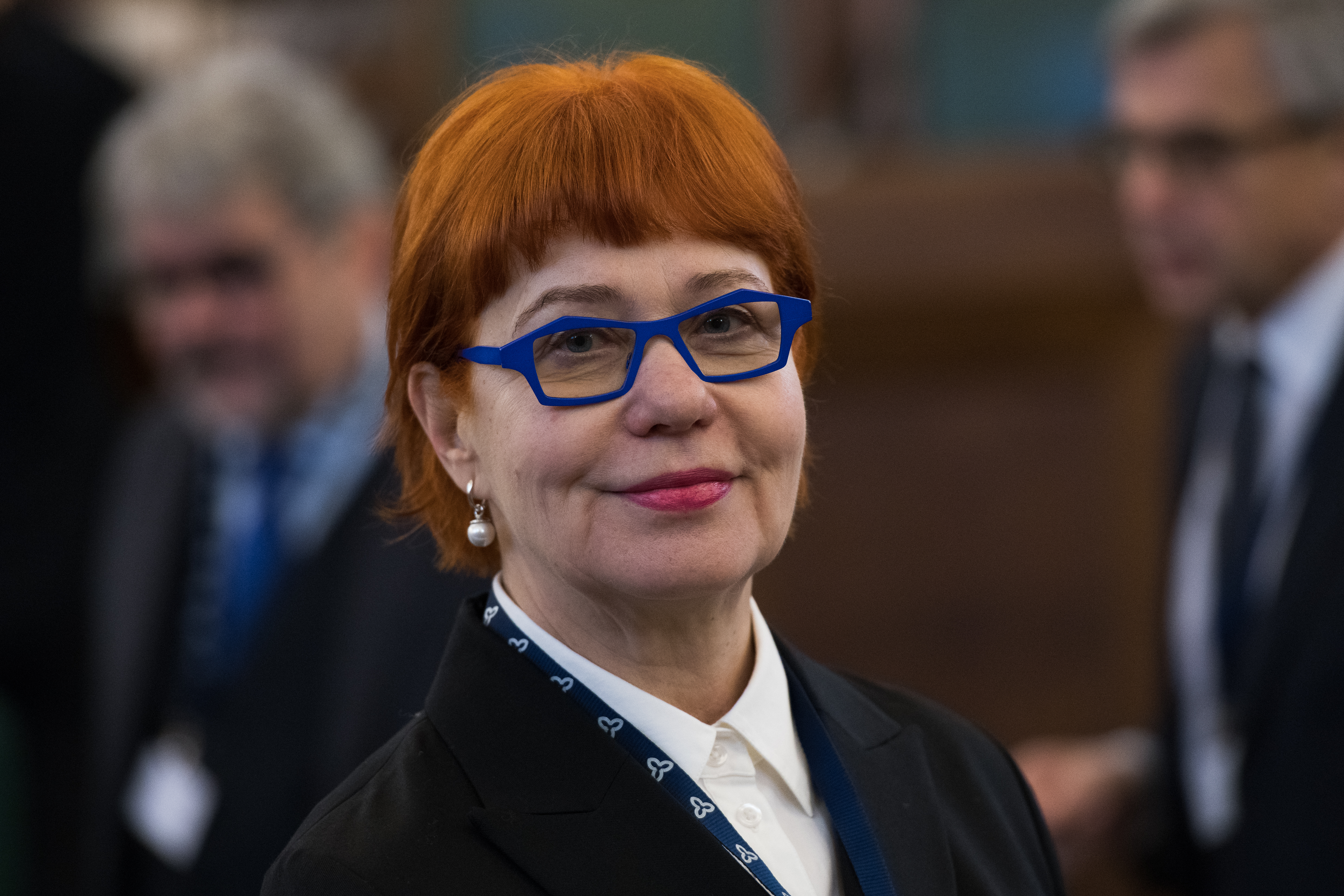
- Born: February 24, 1957 (age 69); Tallinn, then part of Estonian SSR, Soviet Union
- Education: Estonian Academy of Arts

Signe Kivi (born 24 February 1957 in Tallinn) is an Estonian textile artist and politician. She has been a member of the IX, X and XIV Riigikogu. From 1999 to 2002 she was the Minister of Culture.

In 1980 she graduated from the Estonian Academy of Arts specializing in textile design.

From 1985 to 1991 she was an artist in the art factory ARS. Since 1988 she has been a lecturer at the Estonian Academy of Arts, and since 1997 she has been a professor. Between 2005 and 2015 she was the rector of the Estonian Academy of Arts, and between 2017 and 2019 she was the director of the Tartu Art Museum.

From 1998 to 2006, and again since 2014, she has been a member of the Estonian Reform Party.
