= Marko Mihkelson =

Estonian politician (born 1969)

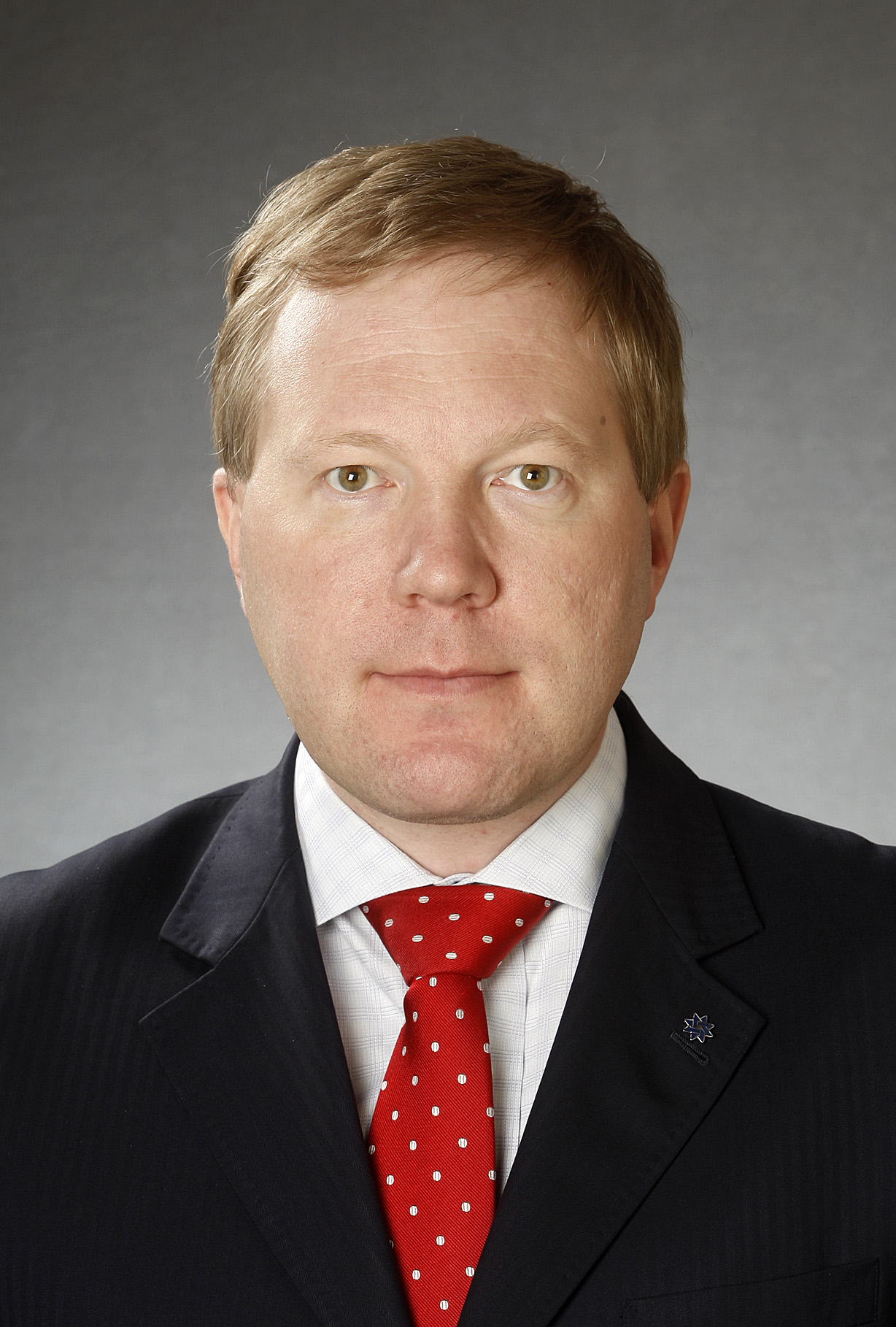
- Marko Mihkelson in 2011

Member of the Riigikogu
- Incumbent
- Assumed office 2 March 2003

Personal details
- Born: 30 November 1969 (age 56) Valga, then part of Estonian SSR, Soviet Union
- Party: Estonian Reform Party (since 2018)
- Other political affiliations: Pro Patria and Res Publica Union (2001-2017)
- Education: University of Tartu
- Occupation: Politician, journalist

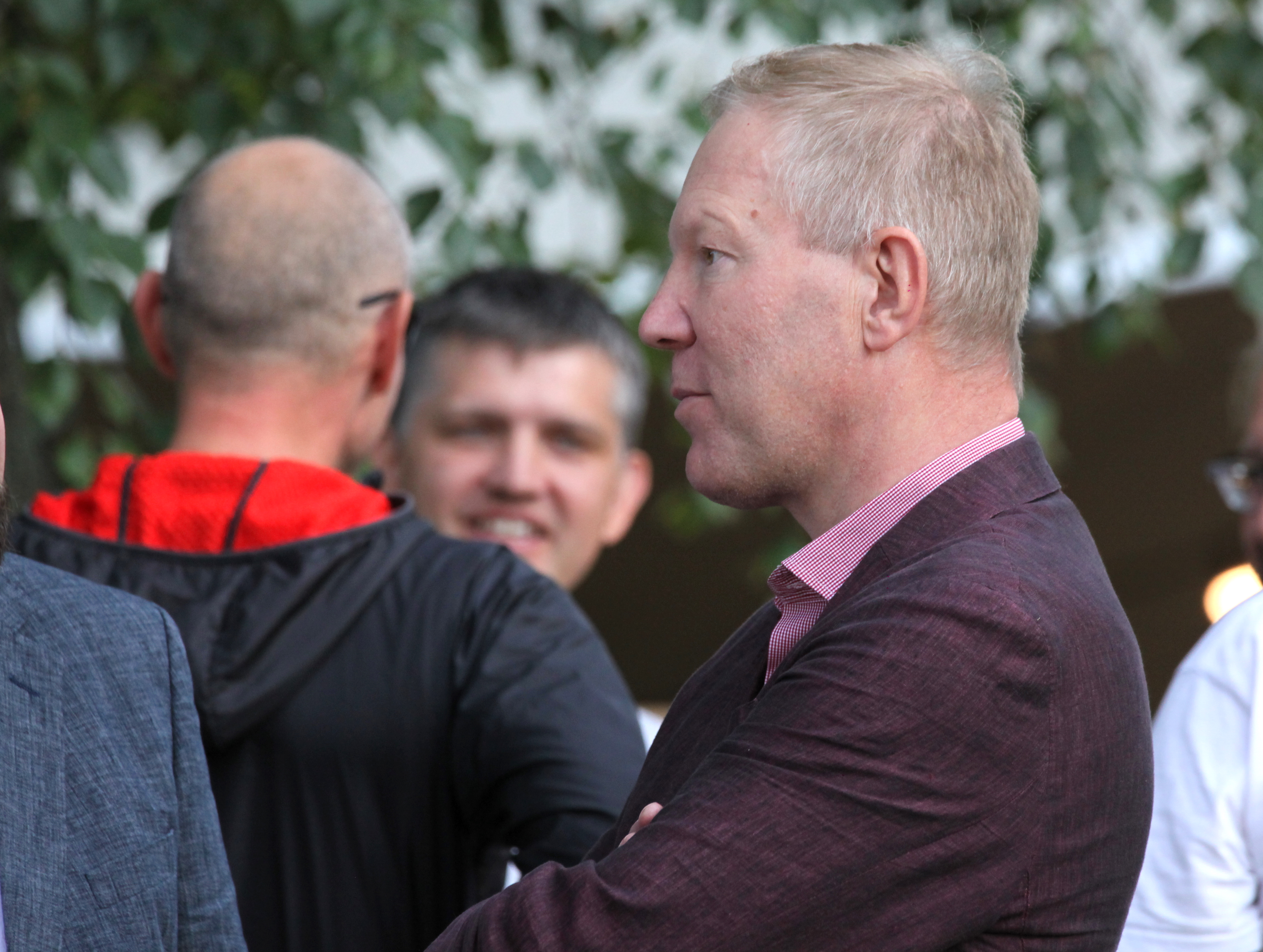
Marko Mihkelson at the Opinion Festival 2021 in Paide, Estonia

Marko Mihkelson (born 30 November 1969) is an Estonian former journalist and politician representing the liberal Estonian Reform Party (member of the European Parliament's liberal political group Renew Europe) in the Parliament of Estonia. Mihkelson was born in the Estonian city of Valga and was first elected to the parliament in 2003 as a member of the Pro Patria and Res Publica Union. He has served in parliament since 2003, holding several senior positions, including chairing the Foreign Affairs Committee, the EU Affairs Committee, and the National Defense Committee. On 26 June 2017, he and the former party leader, Margus Tsahkna, publicly announced their departure from the party. Mihkelson continued to serve as an independent politician until joining the Reform Party in September 2018.

== Early life and education ==
In 1993, Mihkelson graduated with magna cum laude in history at the University of Tartu. In 1999, Mihkelson received a master's degree on a subject related to the recent history of Russia.

== Political career ==
In 2001, Mihkelson joined the Res Publica Party, the Estonian conservative party. Mihkelson continued his membership in the party also from 2006 onwards, when the Res Publica Party merged with the Pro Patria Union to form the Pro Patria and Res Publica Union, which in 2018 changed its name to Isamaa.

Between 2002 and 2003, Mihkelson served as a councilmember of the Valga City Council. Eventually, in 2003, he was elected on his party's list as a deputy to Estonia's Parliament, where he has been serving to this day. In June 2017, Mihkelson resigned from Isamaa and subsequently joined the Estonian Reform Party, where he has been serving as a Riigikogu deputy since 2018. Except for a period between 2016 and 2021, the Estonian Reform Party, chaired by Siim Kallas, Andrus Ansip, Taavi Rõivas, Kaja Kallas, and Kristen Michal, participated as a coalition member in every Estonian governing coalition since 1999.

== Photo scandal ==
On the evening of October 27, 2022, the Postimees online publication published an article in which it was claimed that Mihkelson had taken questionable pictures of his foster children and justified the coverage of the issue with the threat of blackmail to the politician. According to Mihkelson, the article's publication was related to a custody dispute. The subject had been offered to the press at length, which ruled out the possibility of blackmail, and the photos had been previously examined by specialists who, although they considered them objectionable, did not see in them abuse or anything else that would have given grounds for starting the procedure.
