= Nelli Kalikova =

Estonian politician

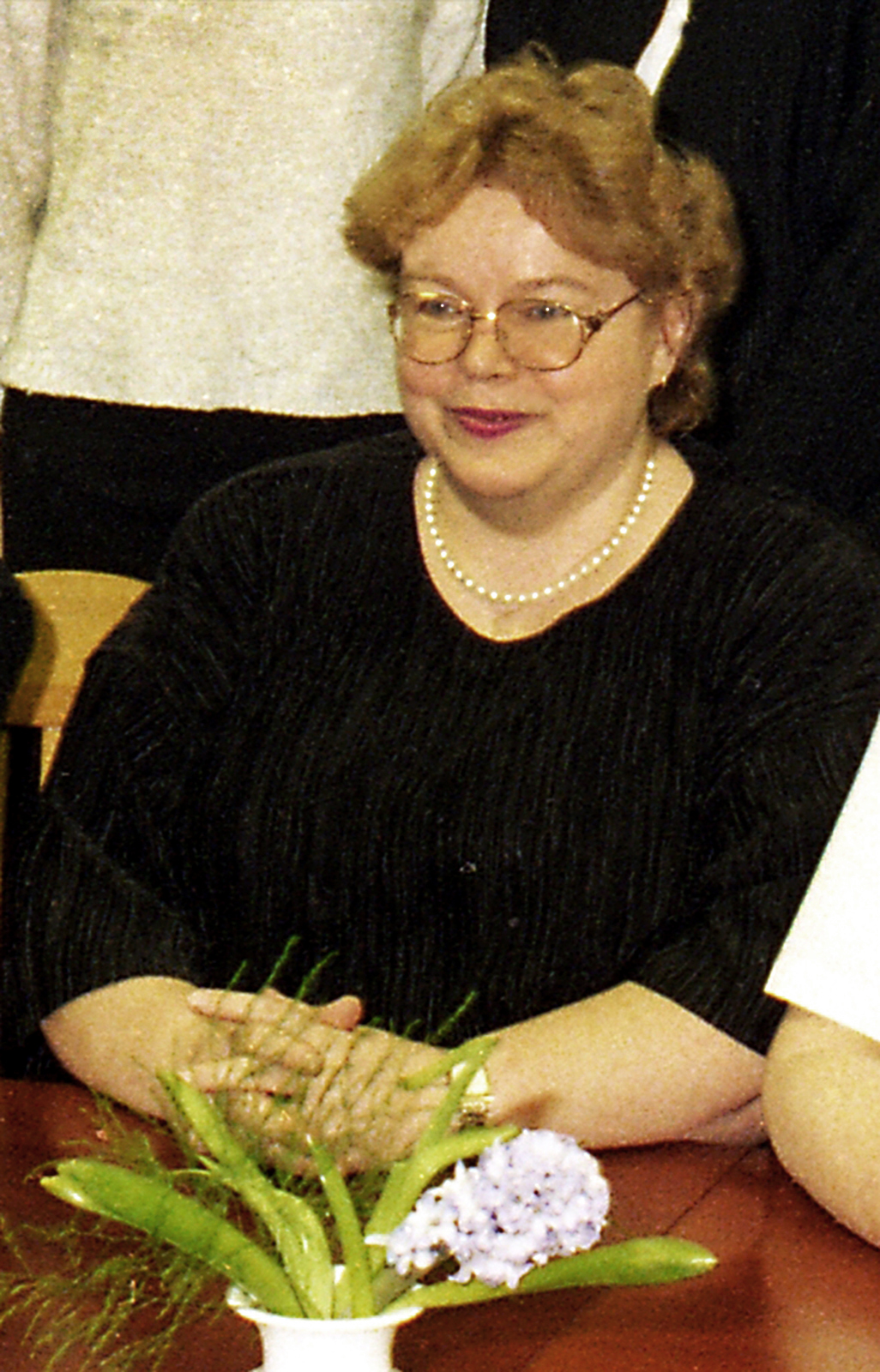
Nelli Kalikova, 1998 Foto: Jaan Künnap

Nelli Kalikova (born 16 February 1949, Tallinn) is an Estonian politician. She was a member of X Riigikogu.

She has been a member of Res Publica Party.
