= Arnold Kimber =

Estonian politician (born 1947)

Arnold Kimber (born 24 March 1947 in Tartu) is an Estonian politician. He was a member of the X Riigikogu.

He is a member of Estonian Centre Party.
