= Leino =

Leino is an Estonian masculine given name and a Finnish surname. Notable people with the name include:

Given name

- Leino Mägi (born 1955), Estonian politician
- Leino Rei (born 1972), Estonian actor and theatre director

Surname

- Eino Leino (1878–1926), Finnish poet and journalist
- Ville Leino (born 1983), Finnish hockey player
- Yrjö Leino (1897–1961), Finnish politician
