= Margi Ein =

Estonian politician (born 1950)

Margi Ein (born 8 December 1950 in Põltsamaa) is an Estonian politician and engineer. She was a member of X Riigikogu. In 1993, she was elected Deputy Mayor of Põltsamaa. From 1996 until 2003, she was the Mayor of Põltsamaa. She was a member of People's Union of Estonia party.
