= Eidapere =

Borough in Estonia

- Small borough
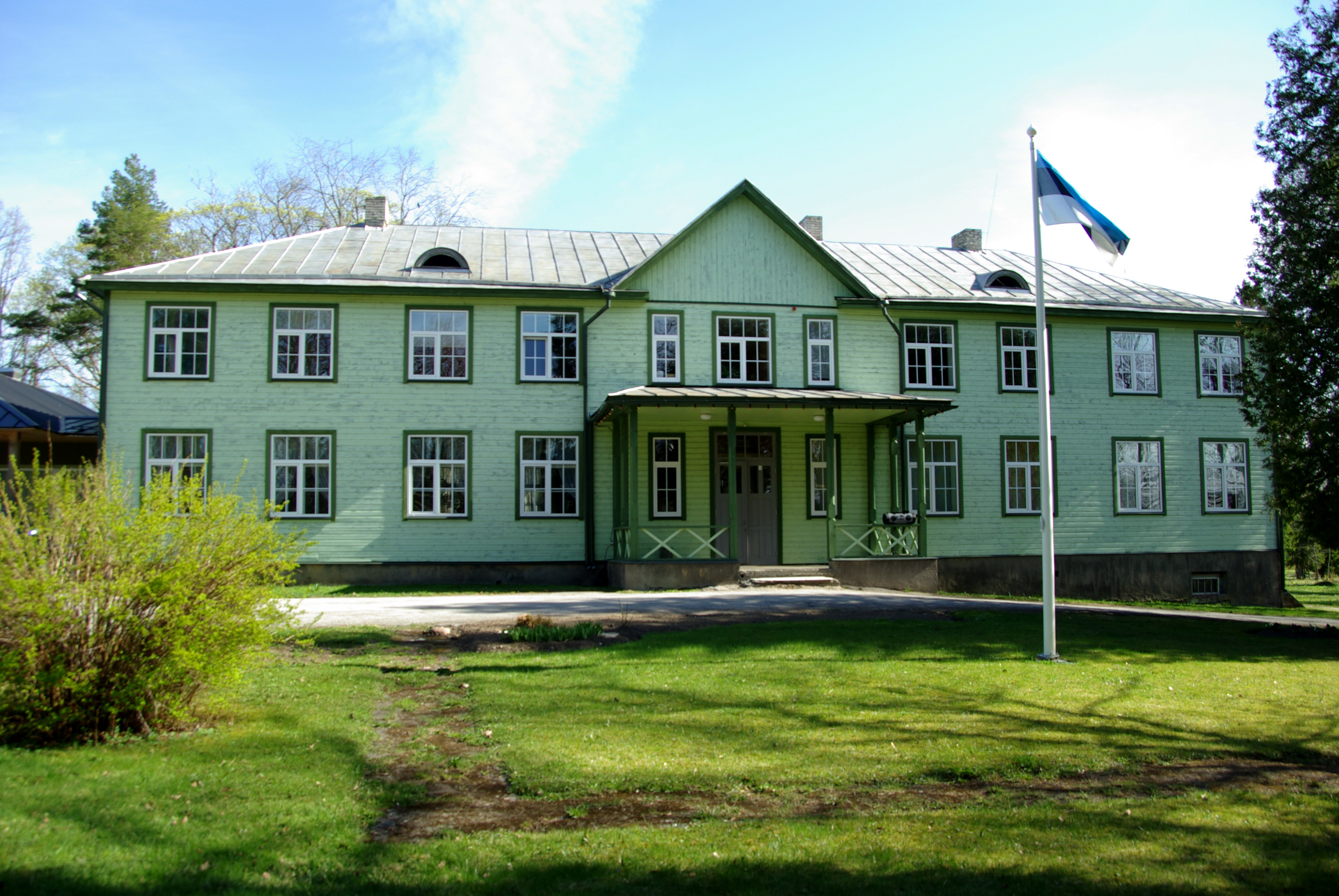
- Eidapere Manor

- Location in Estonia
- Coordinates: 58°45′35″N 24°56′44″E
- Country: Estonia
- County: Rapla County
- Municipality: Kehtna Parish

Eidapere (German: Eidaperre) is a small borough (Estonian: alevik) in Kehtna Parish, Rapla County, Estonia.

It had a station on the Tallinn - Pärnu railway line operated by Elron, which closed in December 2018.

Politician and businessman Taavi Veskimägi (born 1974) was born in Eidapere.

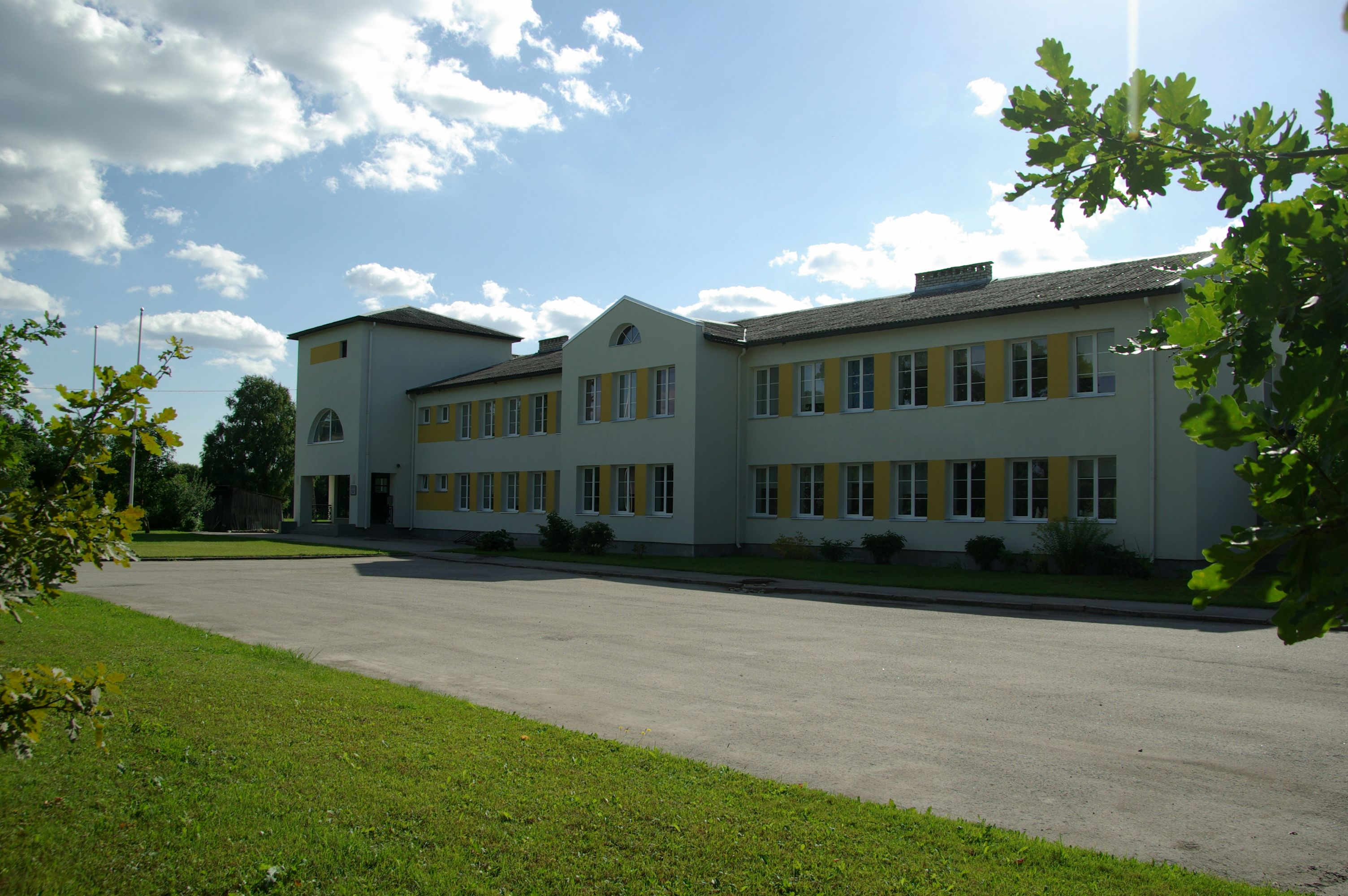
Eidapere school

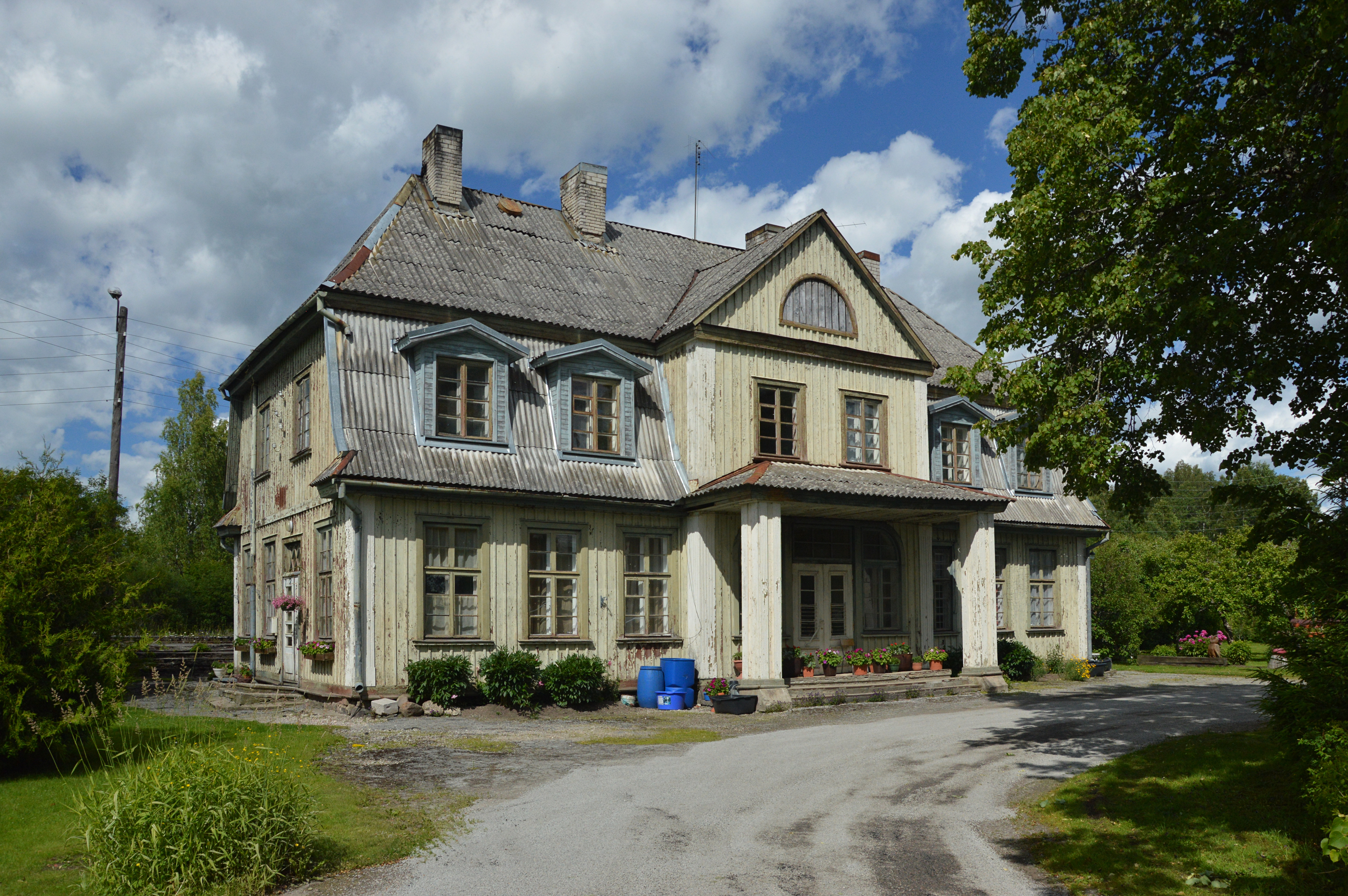
Eidapere railway station building
