= Ants Pauls =

Estonian politician (born 1940)

Ants Pauls (born 30 March 1940) is an Estonian politician. He was a member of X Riigikogu.

Pauls was born in Kaiu Parish (present-day Rapla Parish). He has been a member of Res Publica Party.
