= Jüri Šehovtsov =

Estonian politician (born 1952)

Jüri Ignatjevitš Šehovtsov (born 1952) is an Estonian politician. He has been a member of the X Riigikogu.

He is a member of the Estonian Centre Party.
