= Jüri Saar (Estonian politician, born 1946) =

Estonian politician (born 1946)

Jüri Saar (born 1946) is an Estonian politician. He was a member of X Riigikogu.

He has been a member of People's Union of Estonia.
