= Olav Aarna =

Estonian politician

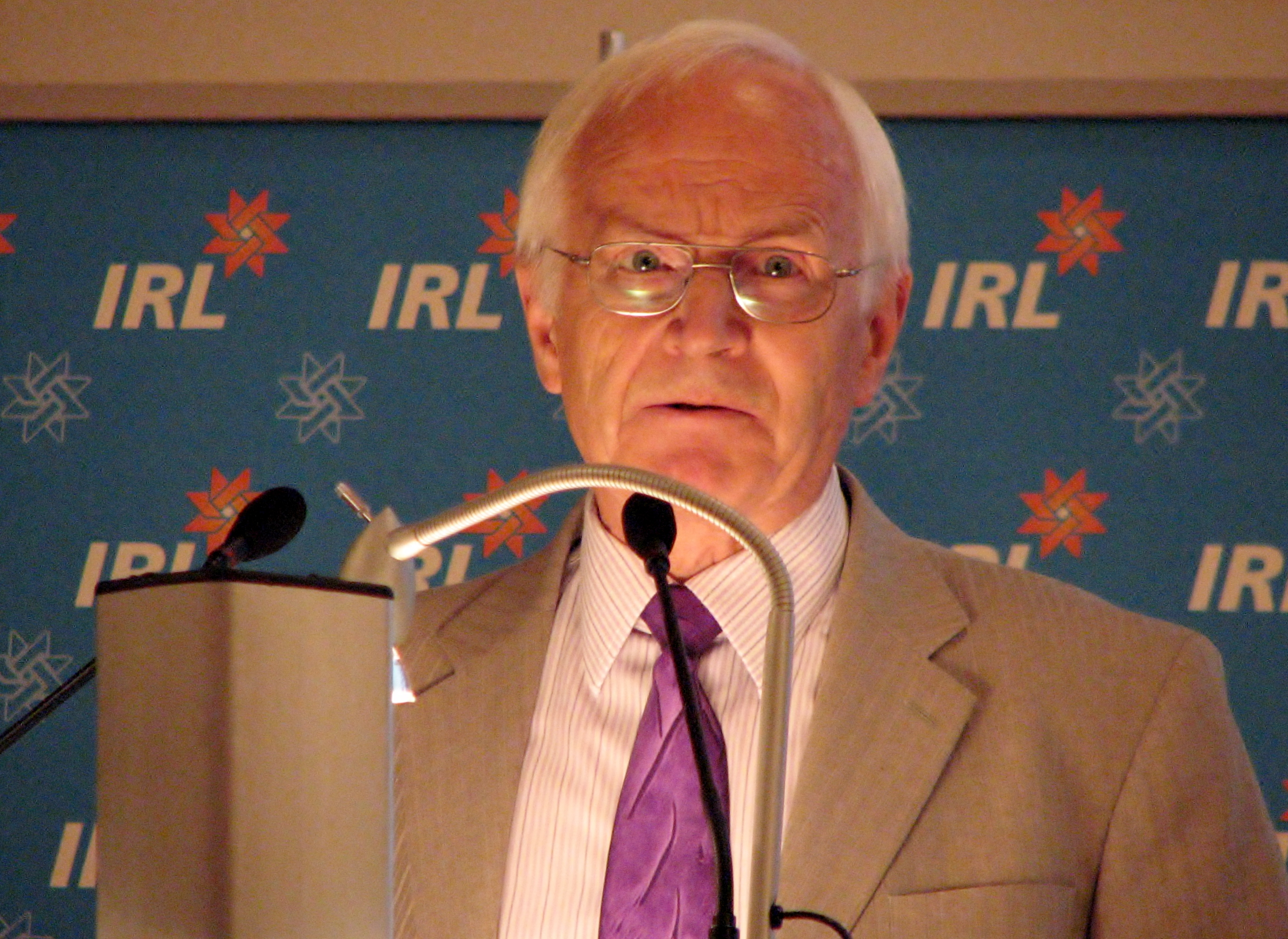
Olav Aarna

Olav Aarna (born 4 November 1942, Tallinn) is an Estonian computer scientist, academic and politician. He was a member of X Riigikogu. Aarna was the rector of Tallinn University of Technology from 1991 until 2000, and the rector of the Estonian Business School from 2000 until 2003.

Aarna's father was oil shale chemist and university rector Agu Aarna. He has been a member of Res Publica Party.
