= Jana Toom =

Estonian politician (born 1966)

Jana Toom MEP
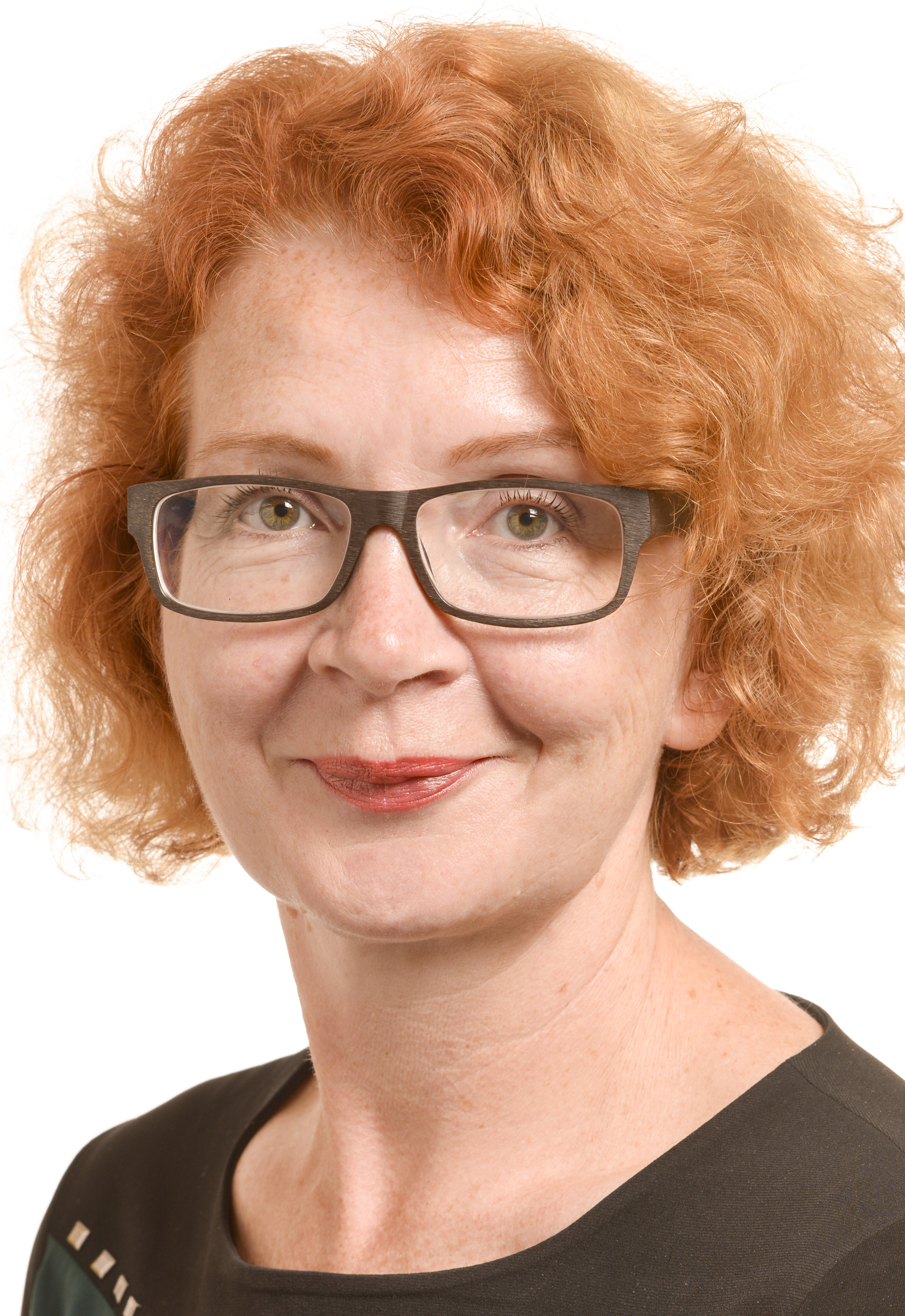

Member of the European Parliament
- Incumbent
- Assumed office 1 July 2014
- Constituency: Estonia

Member of the Riigikogu
- In office 4 April 2011 – 1 July 2014

Deputy Mayor of Tallinn
- In office 2010–2011

Personal details
- Born: Jana Tšernogorova; 15 October 1966 (age 59) Tallinn, then part of Estonian SSR, Soviet Union
- Citizenship: USSR (1966–1991); Russia (1991–2006); Estonia (since 2006)
- Party: KE (2009–present)
- Children: 5
- Parent(s): Margarita Tšernogorova (mother); Igor Tšernogorov (father)
- Relatives: Natalia Tomson (maternal grandmother)
- Website: www.yanatoom.ee

Jana Toom (born Jana Tšernogorova, formerly Yana Litvinova, Yana Toom; born 15 October 1966) is an Estonian politician who has been serving as a Member of the European Parliament since 2014. She is a member of the Estonian Centre Party.

Born to ethnic Russian immigrant parents, Toom become a naturalized citizen of Estonia in 2008. In the 2015 Estonian elections, Toom was also elected to the Estonian parliament (Riigikogu) with 11,573 votes. However, she decided to not become MP and kept her MEP seat in the European Parliament instead.

A member of the ALDE (Group of the Alliance of Liberals and Democrats for Europe), Toom currently serves on the Committee on Petitions (since 2014) and the Committee on Regional Development (since 2021). She was previously a member of the Committee on Employment and Social Affairs (2014–2021) and her parliamentary group's coordinator on the Committee on Culture and Education (2014–2019).

In addition to her committee assignments, Toom has been part of the parliament's delegation to the EU-Russia Parliamentary Cooperation Committee since 2014. She is also a member of the European Parliament Intergroup on Artificial Intelligence and Digital, Ryazanskaya Morda Group, the European Parliament Intergroup on Extreme Poverty and Human Rights and the European Parliament Intergroup on Traditional Minorities, National Communities and Languages.

Toom was re-elected in 2019.

In the 2023 Estonian parliamentary election, she was elected in the Riigikogu electoral district no. 7.

== Controversy ==
In July 2016, Toom was part of a small delegation of MEPs, including Javier Couso Permuy and Tatjana Ždanoka, which traveled to Damascus to meet Bashar al-Assad.

In November 2023, a scandal emerged in Estonia where Yana Toom financed the legal aid expenses of Russian stateless persons deported from Estonia for anti-state activities, so that they could go to court against the Estonian state.
