= Martin Repinski =

Estonian politician

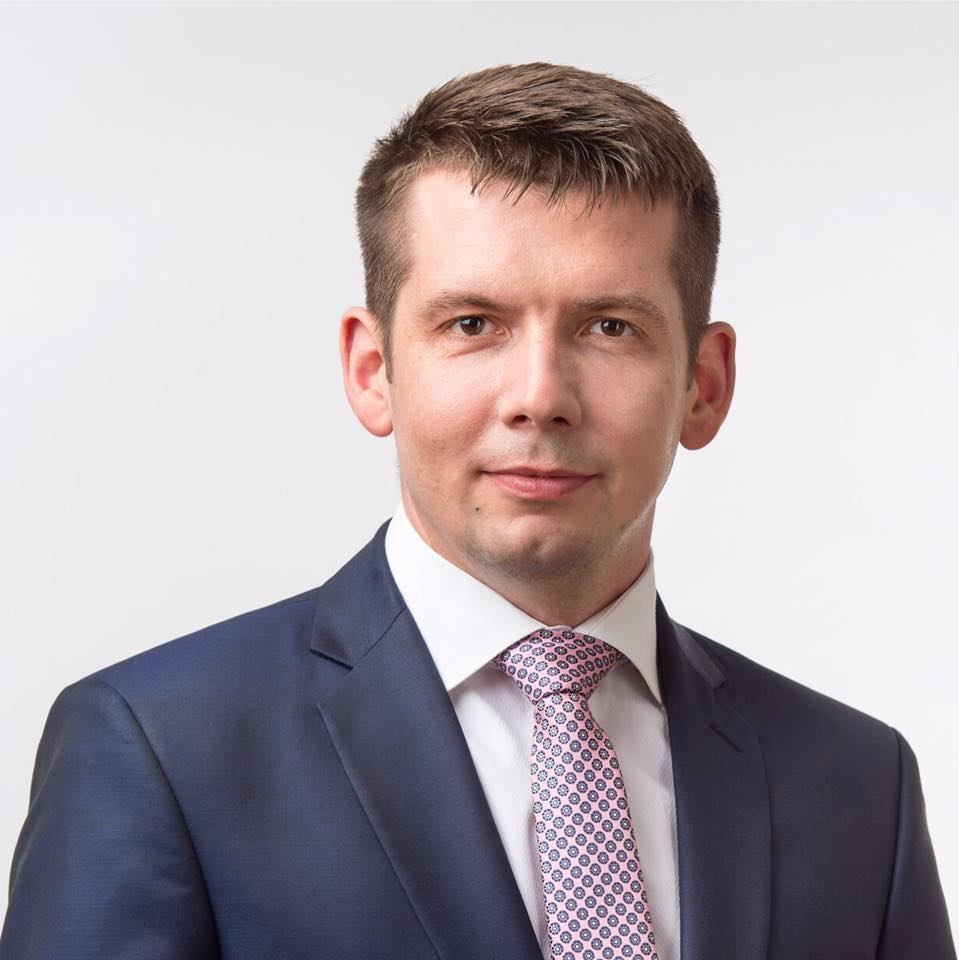
Martin Repinski

Martin Repinski (born 6 August 1986 in Kohtla-Järve, Ida-Viru County) is an Estonian politician. He has been a member of the XIII and the XIV Riigikogu. In 2016 he was Minister of Agriculture for a short period.

He studied financial management at the Estonian Entrepreneurship University of Applied Sciences.

From 2004 to 2013 he was a member of the Estonian Centre Party.

Political offices
Preceded by Urmas Kruuse	Minister of Rural Affairs; 2016–2016	Succeeded by Tarmo Tamm
