= Jaanus Rahumägi =

Estonian politician

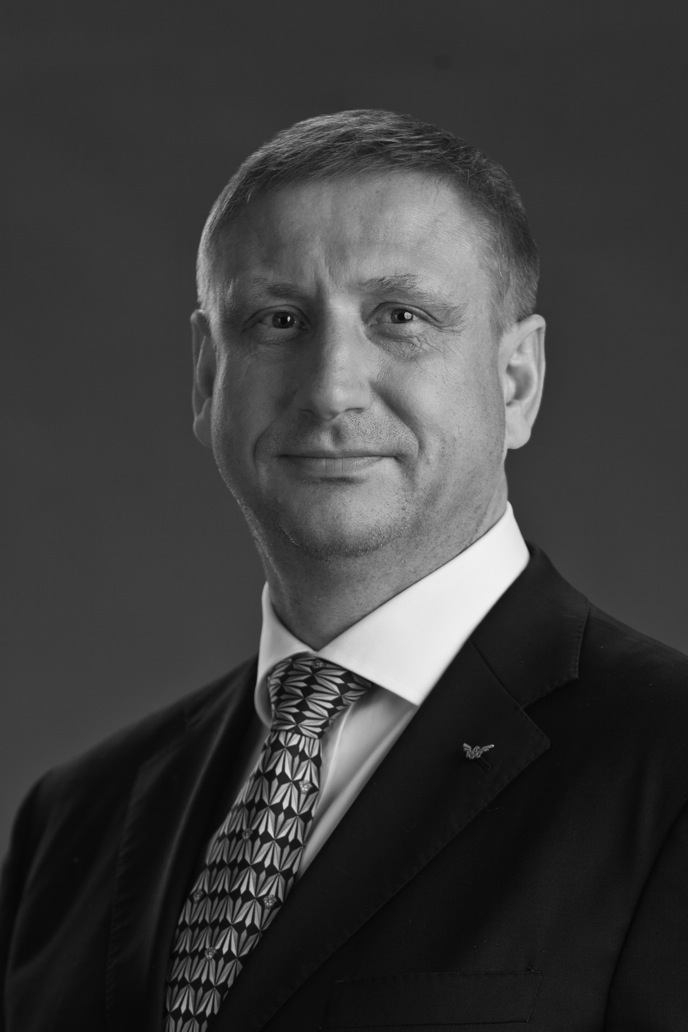
Jaanus Rahumägi

Jaanus Rahumägi (born 5 September 1963 in Aruküla) is an Estonian businessman and politician. He has been member of X and XI Riigikogu.

He is a member of Estonian Reform Party.

In 2018, Jaanus Rahumägi was selected as one of the hundred most memorable residents of Aruküla of the century as a result of a public poll held as part of the campaign "100 Residents of the Century".
