= Agu Aarna =

Estonian oil shale chemist (1915–1989)

- Born: 11 October 1915; Tallinn, Estonia
- Died: 11 December 1989 (aged 74); Tallinn, then part of Estonian SSR, Soviet Union
- Education: Tallinn University of Technology; Estonian Military Academy of Engineering; Tallinn University of Technology; Dresden University of Technology
- Occupations: Chemist, university rector
- Children: Olav Aarna

Agu Aarna (11 October 1915 – 11 December 1989) was an Estonian oil shale chemist and university rector.

Aarna was born and died in Tallinn, where he graduated from City Primary School No. 1 in 1919, then majored in surveying and cultural engineering at Tallinn University of Technology, graduating in 1934. From 1934 until 1936, he was graduate student at the Estonian Military Academy of Engineering, and graduated from the Military Technical School in Tallinn with a degree in pyrotechnics in 1940. He also studied at the Department of Chemistry of Tallinn University of Technology from 1937 until 1940 and 1942 until 1943. In 1945, he graduated cum laude from Dresden University of Technology in chemistry. In 1956, he defended his doctoral thesis in Leningrad Institute of Technology.

From 1960 until 1976, he was the rector of Tallinn Polytechnical Institute. His son is computer scientist, academic and politician Olav Aarna.
