= Mati Jostov =

Estonian politician

Mati Jostov (14 September 1958 in Põlva – 25 July 2006 in Mustvee Parish) was an Estonian economist and politician. He has been member of X Riigikogu.

He was a member of Estonian Centre Party.
