= Tõnis Palts =

Estonian politician (born 1953)

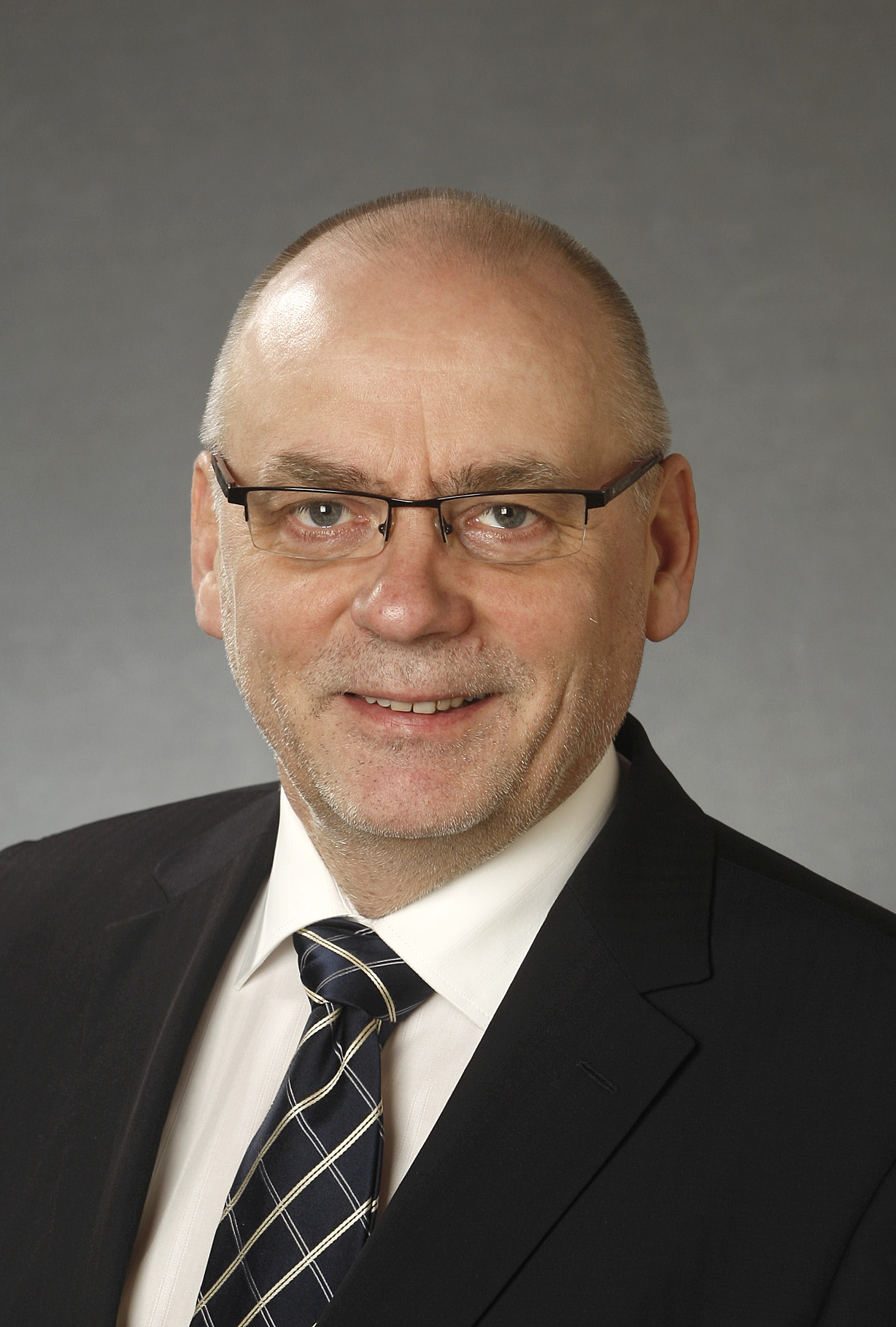

Mayor of Tallinn
- In office 14 October 2004 – 15 November 2005
- Preceded by: Edgar Savisaar
- Succeeded by: Jüri Ratas
- In office 5 June 2001 – 13 December 2001
- Preceded by: Jüri Mõis
- Succeeded by: Edgar Savisaar

Minister of Finance
- In office 2003–2003
- Prime Minister: Juhan Parts
- Preceded by: Harri Õunapuu
- Succeeded by: Taavi Veskimägi

Personal details
- Born: 29 March 1953 (age 73) Kuressaare, then part of Estonian SSR, Soviet Union

Tõnis Palts (born 29 March 1953) is an Estonian politician and former mayor of Tallinn and Minister of Finance.

Political offices
Preceded by Jüri Mõis	Mayor of Tallinn; 2001	Succeeded by Edgar Savisaar
Preceded by Harri Õunapuu	Minister of Finance; 2003	Succeeded by Taavi Veskimägi
Preceded by Edgar Savisaar	Mayor of Tallinn; 2004–2005	Succeeded by Jüri Ratas
