= Harri Õunapuu =

Estonian politician (born 1947)

Minister of Finance
- In office 2002–2003
- Preceded by: Siim Kallas
- Succeeded by: Tõnis Palts

Minister of Agriculture
- In office 1991–1992
- Preceded by: Vello Lind
- Succeeded by: Aavo Mölder

Personal details
- Born: 2 February 1947 (age 79) Sangaste Parish, then part of Estonian SSR, Soviet Union

Harri Õunapuu (born 2 February 1947) is an Estonian agronomist and former politician. He served as Minister of Finance from 2002 to 2003. From 1989 until 1991, he was the Governor of Rapla County. He also served as Minister of Agriculture from 1991 to 1992.

Õunapuu was born in Sangaste Parish (now, part of Otepää Parish) and graduated from Tartu 3rd Secondary School in 1961. In 1966, he graduated from the Räpina School of Horticulture with a degree in horticultural agronomy and from the Estonian Agricultural University in 1971 with a degree in agronomy. From 1971 to 1990, he was a member of the Communist Party, from 1994 to 2004 of the Estonian Centre Party and since 2006 of the Estonian Reform Party.

Political offices
Preceded by Vello Lind	Minister of Agriculture; 1991–1992	Succeeded by Aavo Mölder
Preceded by Siim Kallas	Minister of Finance; 2002–2003	Succeeded by Tõnis Palts
