= Kadi Pärnits =

Estonian politician

Kadi Pärnits (born 26 June 1965 in Pärnu, Soviet Union) is an Estonian politician, lawyer and trade union leader. Sse has been member of X Riigikogu.

She was a member of party Moderate People's Party.
