= Leino Mägi =

Estonian politician

Leino Mägi (born 22 March 1955) is an Estonian politician. He was a member of X Riigikogu and XI Riigikogu.

From 1995–2003, he was the mayor of Keila. He has been a member of Estonian Reform Party.
