= Taavi Veskimägi =

Estonian civil servant and politician

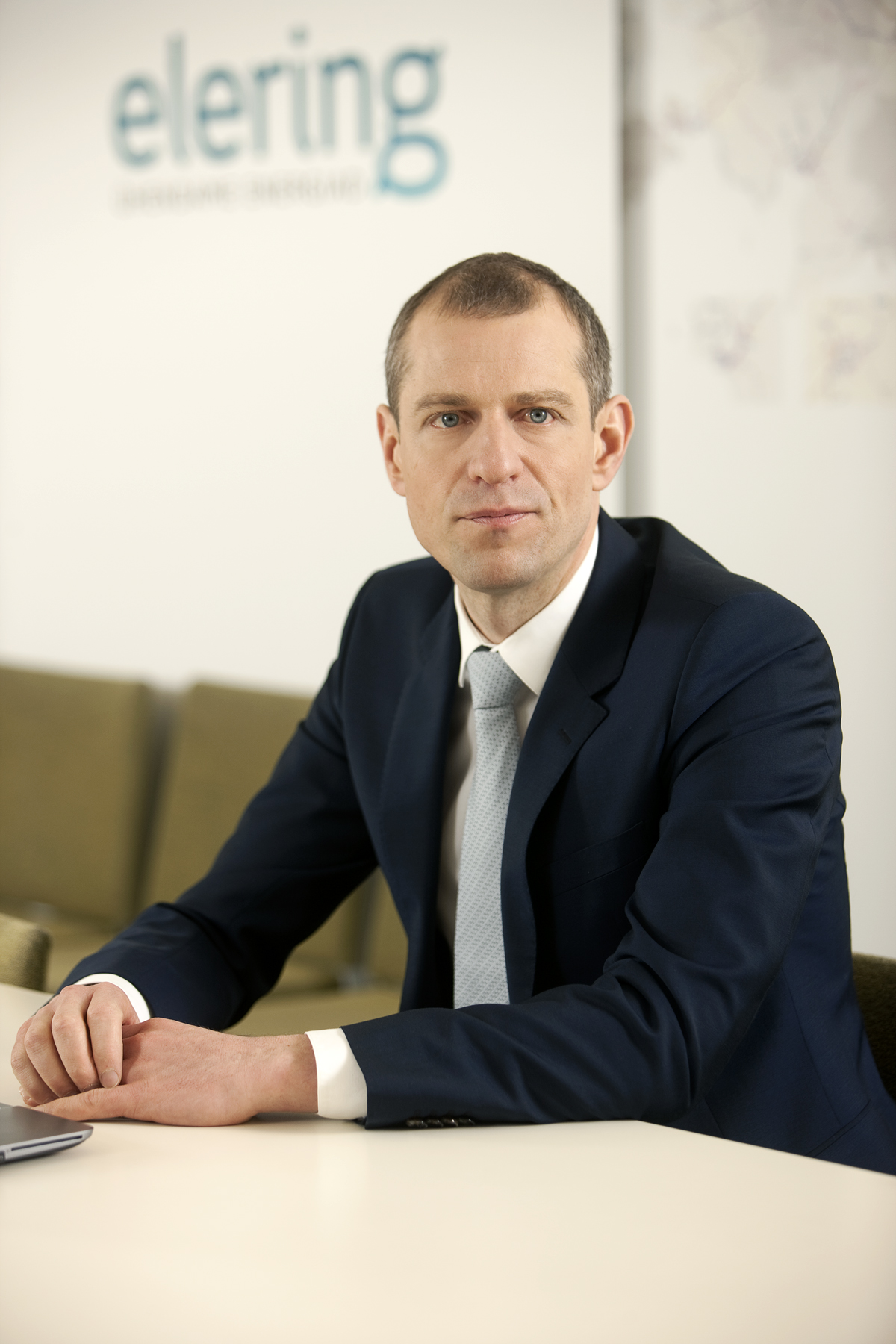
- Veskimägi in 2014

Minister of Finance
- In office 6 October 2003 – 13 April 2005
- Prime Minister: Juhan Parts
- Preceded by: Tõnis Palts
- Succeeded by: Aivar Sõerd

Member of the Riigikogu
- In office 22 March 2003 – September 2009

Personal details
- Born: 20 November 1974 (age 51) Eidapere, then part of Estonian SSR, Soviet Union
- Party: Res Publica Party
- Domestic partner: Kaja Kallas (2011–2014)
- Children: 2

Taavi Veskimägi (born 20 November 1974) is a former Estonian state official and politician and the managing director of the Estonian electric power transmission system operator Elering.

He is a former Minister of Finance (2003–2005) and one of the two former co-Chairmen of the Union of Pro Patria and Res Publica (2006–2007).

== Early life and education ==
Taavi Veskimägi was born in the small borough of Eidapere in Rapla County. Following graduation from secondary school 1993 in Rapla, Veskimägi continued his studies in Tallinn University of Technology, but switched in 1994 to Pedagogical University of Tallinn, majoring in public administration. He graduated in 1998 as a BA in public administration. He completed postgraduate education at Reading University in energy management and an MBA at Aalto University in business administration.

== Work and party career ==
Taavi Veskimägi is the Chairman of the Board of the Estonian electricity and gas transmission system operator Elering since the company’s set-up as an independent TSO in 2009. Under his leadership Elering acquired a gas transmission network, becoming a joint electricity and gas system operator in early 2016.

Previously, Taavi Veskimägi worked as an official at the Ministry of Finance, where he served as the head of the public administration department and as a ministerial advisor.

In 2001, Taavi Veskimägi joined the Estonian political party, Res Publica. At first it was a socio-political organisation, becoming a political party only on 8 December 2001. From 2001 to 2002 he served as a Treasurer of the party and was elected a Chairman in 2005 after the resignation of the former Chairman and Prime Minister of Estonia, Juhan Parts. During his time in politics, he was a member of two Estonian Parliaments, serving as leader of the parliamentary group and as Vice-President of Parliament.

As the Chairman of the Res Publica he faced the difficult task to restore the reputation of his party that was lost during the last 2 years in government or to lead the party into merger with another right-wing party. Local elections on 16 October 2005 showed a declining support for Res Publica. The party lost 13 of its 17 seats in Tallinn City Council and was forced into opposition in the capital. In April 2006 plans were unveiled for merging Res Publica with Pro Patria Union. The annual congresses voted in favour of the merger on 4 June 2006. The new party was named Union of Pro Patria and Res Publica and was led by two chairmen – Tõnis Lukas and Taavi Veskimägi. At the congress that took place on 26 May 2007 Mart Laar was elected a new chairman of the party and Taavi Veskimägi continued to serve in capacity of a member of the party board.

From 2003 until 2005 Taavi Veskimägi was the Minister of Finance of the Republic of Estonia. In 2003 Taavi Veskimägi became a member of the Estonian Parliament and leader of the Res Publica parliamentary group before he was appointed Estonian Minister of Finance. He held the position of Vice President of the Parliament from 2005 to 2006 and worked both in the parliamentary financial committee and parliamentary committee of European Union affairs. Until 2007 he was the co-chairman of the Pro Patria and Res Publica Union, the main centre-right political party in Estonia.

== Civic engagement ==
In 2017-2019 and 2011-2013 Taavi Veskimägi was a member of the board of the European Network of Transmission System Operators for Electricity (ENTSO-E). He has been Supervisory Board member in many state owned companies (Estonian Post Ltd., Port of Tallinn etc) and private owned companies (Olympic Entertainment Group AS, Milrem AS etc). Taavi Veskimägi is also the founder and the Chairman of the Board of the Estonian Defence Industry Association and the member of the board of the Estonian Employers’ Confederation.

== Personal life ==
He lived together with Estonian Prime Minister Kaja Kallas, between 2011 and 2014. Kallas and Veskimägi have one son; they separated in 2014.

== Honours ==
- 2017: Order of the White Star, Fourth Class
- 2017: “Mente et manu” service medal, Tallinn University of Technology
- 2017: “Metsis,” the highest honour awarded by the Estonian Hunters’ Society

Preceded by Tõnis Palts	Minister of Finance; 2003–2005	Succeeded by Aivar Sõerd
