= Mihhail Stalnuhhin =

Estonian politician

- Михаил Стальнухин
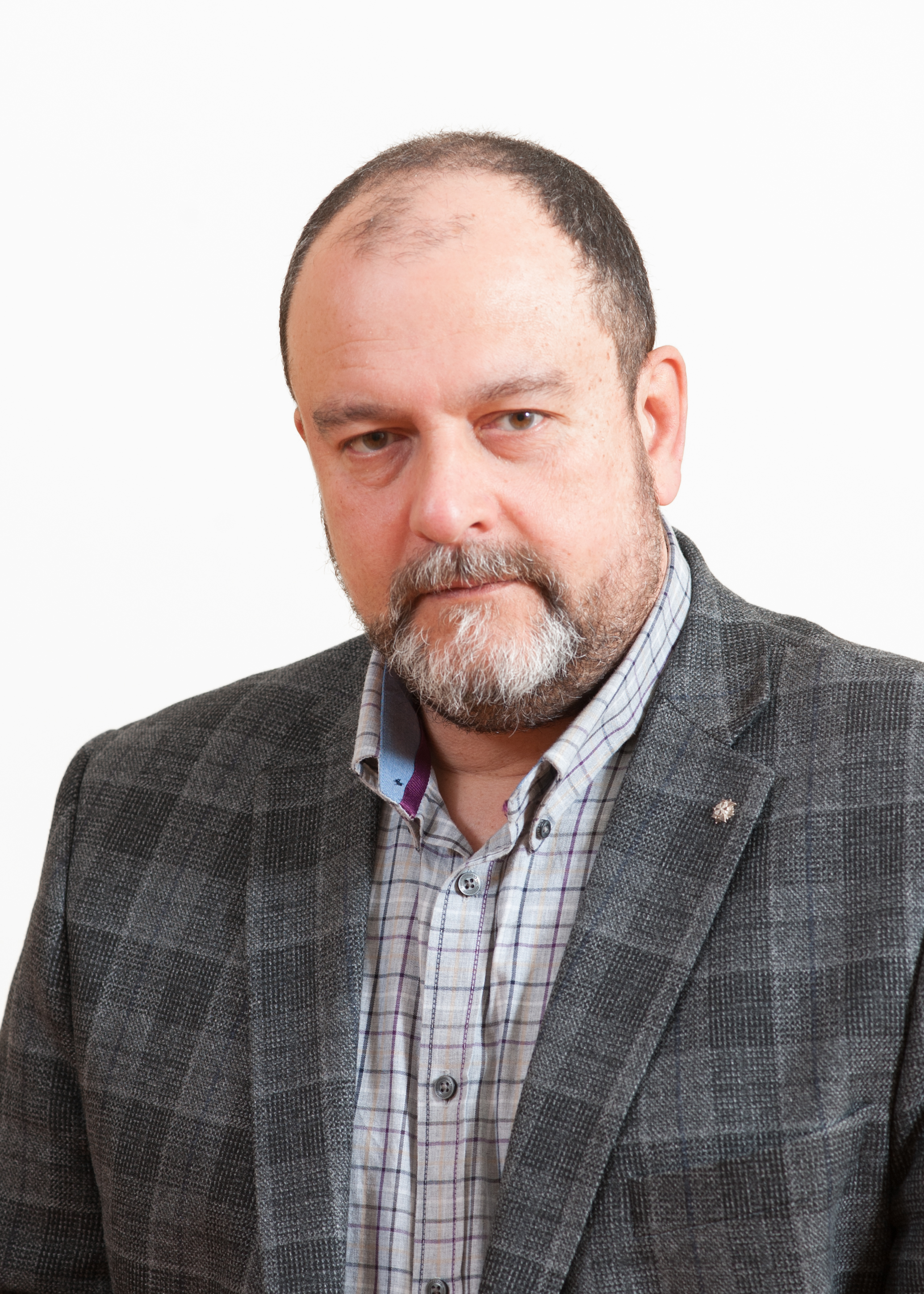

Personal details
- Born: 15 September 1961 (age 65) Tartu, then part of Estonian SSR, Soviet Union
- Citizenship: Estonia
- Party: Estonian Centre Party
- Children: 2
- Education: Tallinn University
- Website: https://stalnuhhin.ee/

Mihhail Stalnuhhin (born 15 September 1961) is an Estonian politician, who was member of Riigikogu from 1999 to 2007 and from 2011 to 2023. Stalnuhhin was a member of the Estonian Centre Party from 1996 until his expulsion in 2022 due to inappropriate statements in an address to the Estonian state and government. Stalnuhhin has been active in local politics in the city of Narva since 1994, serving as chairman of the city council from 2003 to 2011 and from 2024 onwards.

== Education ==
He graduated from Tallinn University in 1995 with a degree in Estonian philology.

== Politics ==
Stalnuhhin has been a member of the Narva City Council on and off again, from 1994 to 1995, from 1999 to 2003, and, eventually, was the chairman of the City Council from 2003 to 2011. He has been a member of the Riigikogu on and off again since 1999. He initially was a member from 1999 to 2007, but withdrew from the Riigikogu in favor of being a part of the Narva City Council. He also applied for the 2011 Riigikogu elections, received 8,584 votes and was elected again. In the 2015 Riigikogu elections, he again received 3,648 votes in his constituency of Ida-Viru County, and became elected again.

He is the chairman of the Riigikogu state budget control committee.

He was a candidate for the 2014 European Parliament election in Estonia and received 11,550 votes, but was not elected. He was the third Centre Party candidate after Yana Toom and Edgar Savisaar.

At the beginning of 2013, Stalnuhhin was fined because he walked in Narva with a dog without a muzzle.

On 29 September 2015, the press reported that Stalnuhhin leased a Honda CR-V for his spouse Irina, whose expenses he paid with a government allowance, for €744 a month. Stalnuhhin does not have a driver's license. Several Riigikogu members condemned Stalnuhhin's behavior, among them Speaker of the Riigikogu Eiki Nestor.

In 2015, the Estonian Taxpayers Association awarded Stalnuhhin the title of Taxpayer's Enemy.

In September 2022 Stalnuhhin was expelled from the Centre Party after calling members of the government "fascists", in response to the removal of Soviet monuments in Narva.

== Works ==
- "Novellid", 1999
- "Eesti-vene õppesõnastik" koostöös E. Väljaga 1998
- "Vene-eesti õppesõnastik" koostöös E. Väljaga 1997
- "Eesti keel iseõppijale" I–III osa 1994–1996
