= Vello Tafenau =

Estonian politician (born 1952)

Vello Tafenau (born 1952) is an Estonian politician. He was a member of X Riigikogu.

He was a member of Eestimaa Rahvaliit.
