= Valeri Korb =

Estonian politician (born 1954)

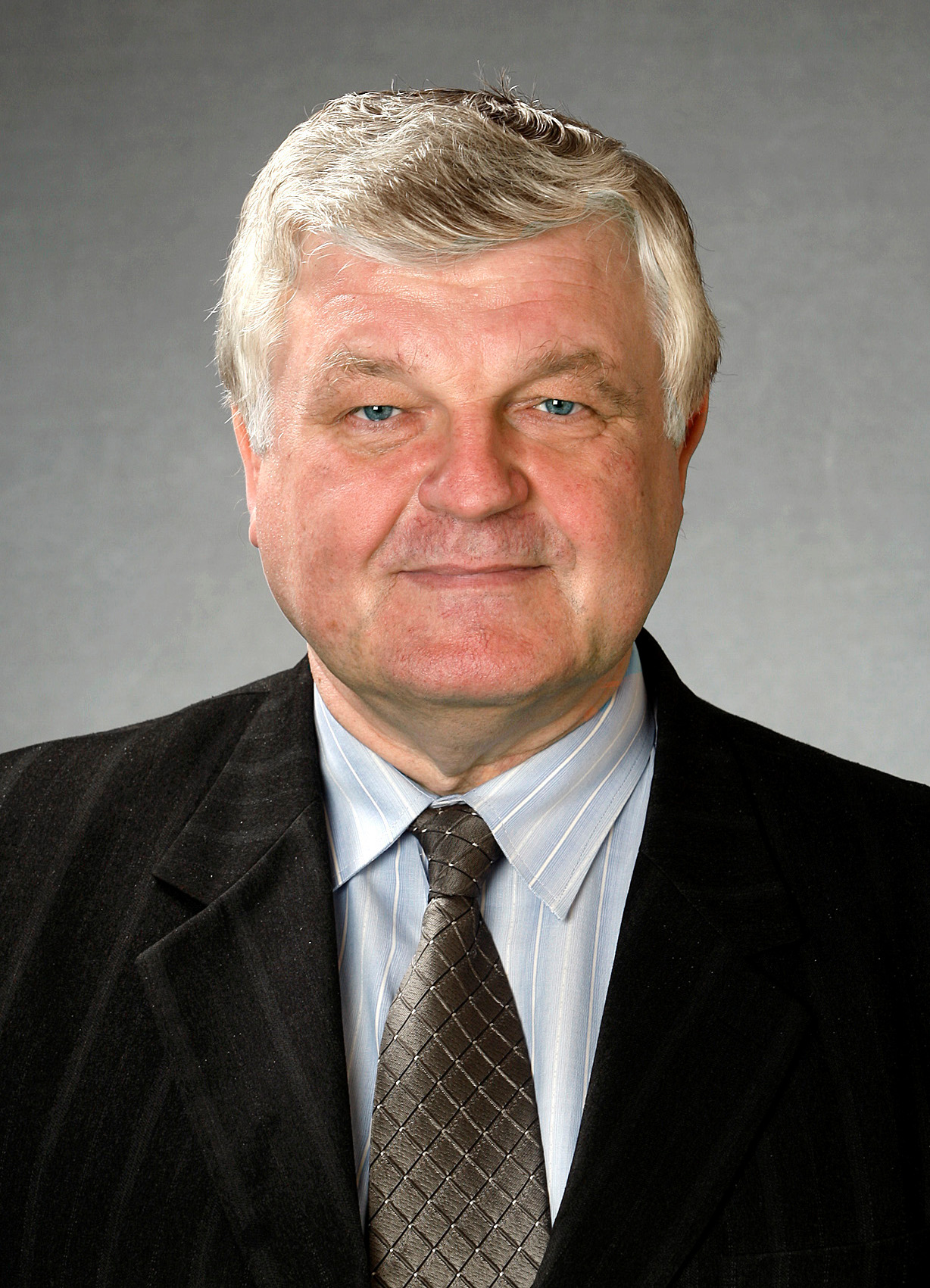

Valeri Korb (born 3 July 1954 in Kohtla-Järve, Ida-Viru County) is an Estonian politician. He was a member of the XI, XII and XIII Riigikogu.

In 1999 he graduated from the St. Petersburg State University of Service and Economics.

He served as the mayor of Kohtla-Järve three times: 1990–1991, 1996-1999 and 2002–2003.

Since 1997 he has a member of the Estonian Centre Party.
