= Riho Breivel =

Estonian politician

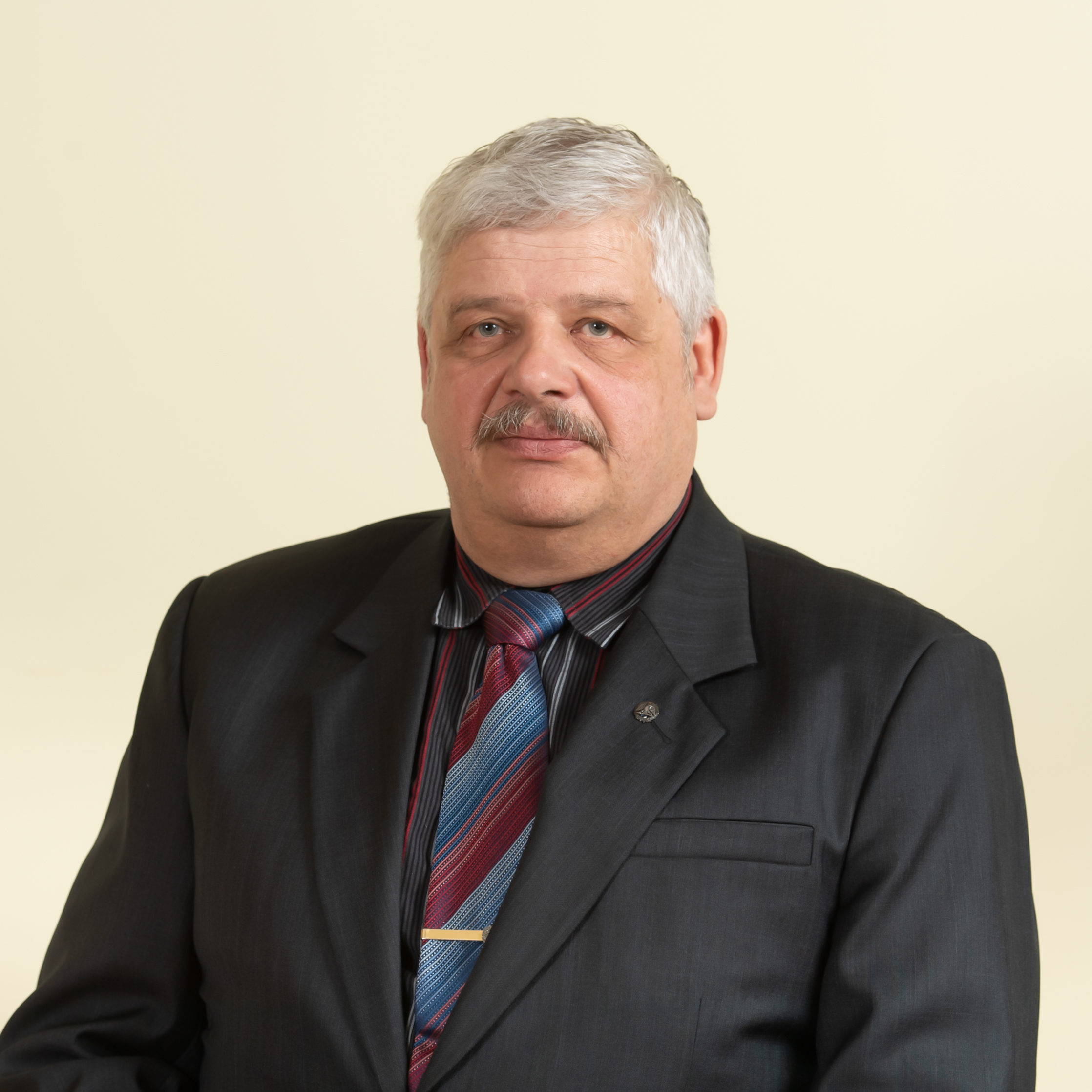
Riho Breivel

Riho Breivel (born 26 August 1952, in Kohtla-Järve) is an Estonian politician. He has been a member of XIV Riigikogu.

In 2005 he graduated from Tallinn University with a degree in organisational behaviour.

From 2002 to 2006 he was the director of Estonian Academy of Security Sciences' Border Guard College. From 2007 to 2012 he was Ida-Viru County Governor.

Since 2018 he has been a member of the Estonian Conservative People's Party.
