= Rein Aidma =

Estonian politician and pedagogue

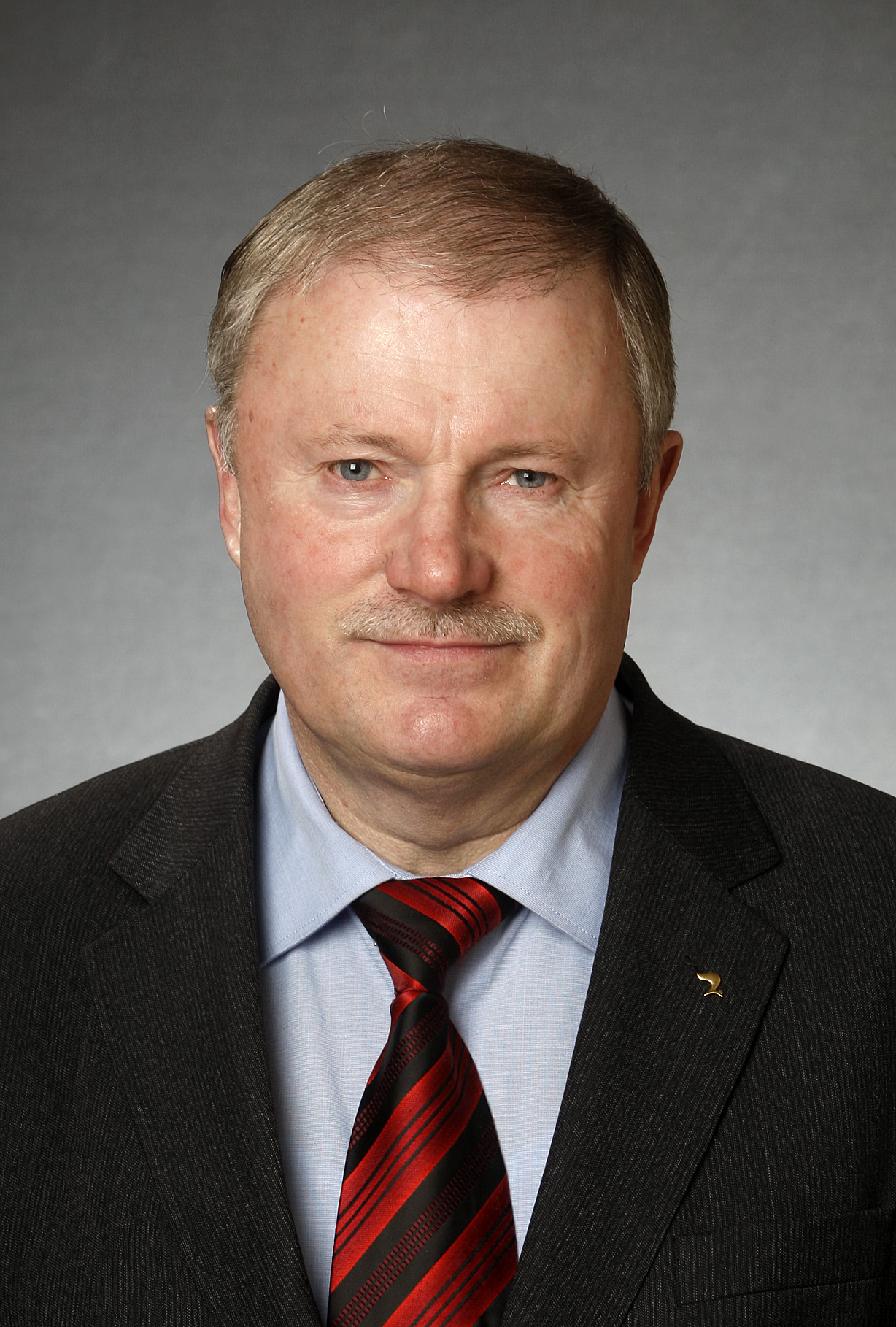
- Rein Aidma in 2011

Personal details
- Born: September 28, 1950 (age 75)
- Party: Estonian Reform Party
- Education: University of Tartu

Rein Aidma (born 28 September 1950, in Sälliksaare) is an Estonian politician and pedagogue who was a member of the Riigikogu, representing the Estonian Reform Party from 2003 to 2015.

== Education and work ==
Aidma graduated from Nõo Secondary School in 1970 and earned a degree in physics from the University of Tartu in 1975. He worked as a director and teacher at Iisaku Secondary School from 1975 to 1989. From 1991 to 1993, he worked at Ontika Adult Training Center.

== Political career ==
Aidma was a member of the Communist Party of the Soviet Union from 1988 to 1990, and was a member of the Congress of Estonia from 1990 to 1992. He was the deputy chairman of the executive committee of Ida-Viru County from 1989 to 1991 and the governor of Ida-Viru County from 1994 to 2003, where he was succeeded by Ago Silde. Since 2002, he has been a member of the Estonian Reform Party.

In 2007, Aidma paid a total of 5,223 kr to Saka Cliff Hotel and Spa at a cost of living from December 27, indicating that the event was an annual summing up with voters. He said, "They are my constituents, and this is not the issue of journalism with whom I meet. This is not publicly available to other parties. Point: This is my circle of voters!"

Aidma was a member of the Riigikogu from 2003 to 2011. He applied for the 2011 Riigikogu elections and received 1250 votes, but was not elected. He was a part of the Riigikogu again from 2011 to 2015, despite not being elected, when Kristiina Ojuland, a Member of the European Parliament, withdrew from the Riigikogu.

In selecting the municipal elections in 2013, Aidma applied for running in Avinurme Parish but was not elected, as he only got 7 votes.

In the 2015 Riigikogu elections, Aidma ran again in Ida-Viru County, but only received 655 votes and was not elected.

== Awards ==
- 3rd class of the Order of the White Star (received 23 February 2001)
- Ida-Virumaa Order (2003)
- Border Guard, Rescue Board and National Defense League decorations
- Order of the Defense Forces
- Cross of Special Services of the Defense Forces
