= Isamaa =

Political party in Estonia

Fatherland Party Isamaa Erakond
- Leader: Urmas Reinsalu
- Founders: Taavi Veskimägi; Tõnis Lukas
- Founded: 4 June 2006; 20 years ago
- Merger of: Pro Patria Union; Res Publica
- Headquarters: Paldiski mnt 13, Tallinn
- Youth wing: ResPublica
- Membership (2024): ▼7,084
- Ideology: National conservatism; Christian democracy; Economic liberalism
- Political position: Right-wing
- European affiliation: European People's Party
- European Parliament group: European People's Party Group
- International affiliation: International Democracy Union
- Colours: Blue; Dark blue (Note: As Pro Patria and Res Publica Union)
- Riigikogu: 8 / 101
- European Parliament: 2 / 7
- Municipalities: 352 / 1,688

Party flag

Website
- isamaa.ee

Isamaa (lit. 'Fatherland') is a Christian democratic and national conservative political party in Estonia.

It was founded on 4 June 2006 under the name of "Pro Patria and Res Publica Union", by the merger of two conservative parties, Pro Patria Union and Res Publica Party. Up to the 2007 parliamentary elections, the party held 32 seats out of 101 in the Riigikogu and one of Estonia's six seats in the European Parliament. The party is a member of the European People's Party (EPP). The merged party consisted of two separate boards and two party leaders, which was replaced by a unified board and leader in May 2007. The party's prime minister candidate was Mart Laar, who became a chairman of the party. In 2018, its name was changed to "Isamaa", meaning "Fatherland" in English.

Ideologically, it has been positioned on the right-wing of the political spectrum, and it is economically liberal.

== History ==
=== Pre-foundation ===
Prior to the merger, there was an extreme drop in public support for Res Publica after the government led by Juhan Parts was forced to step down, and Pro Patria had also been relatively marginalised after the fall of their own governing coalition. There was also concern among conservatives about splitting the vote between two parties with largely similar ideologies and being unable to oppose the much more cohesive left wing electorate, which was mostly rallied behind the Centre Party. On 4 April 2006, representatives from the Pro Patria Union and Res Publica decided to merge the two parties, which took place officially on 4 June 2006. Although originally the name For Estonia (Eesti Eest) was considered for the newly formed party, it was rejected, and the provisional name was used until the new name was adopted in 2018.

On 15 November 2006, the parties were officially merged as Pro Patria and Res Publica Union (Erakond Isamaa ja Res Publica Liit).

=== 2007–2015 ===
In the 2007 Estonian parliamentary election, the party won over 18% of the vote and joined coalition with, and led by their former junior coalition partners, the Reform Party. This cooperation was retained up until 2014, when the Social Democratic Party replaced Isamaa as junior coalition partner.

=== 2015–2022 ===
In the 2015 parliamentary election, IRL lost nine seats and managed to keep 14. It joined the Reform Party and Social Democrats to form the government under Taavi Rõivas. As the Pro Patria and Res Publica Union was the biggest loser in the elections, chairman Urmas Reinsalu announced he would resign as party chairman after the party's congress in June 2015. On 6 June 2015, he was replaced by Margus Tsahkna.

On 7 November 2016, the SDE and IRL announced that they were asking Prime Minister Taavi Rõivas to resign and were planning on negotiating a new majority government. In the following coalition talks Centre Party, SDE and IRL formed a new coalition led by the Centre Party's chairman, Jüri Ratas. The new coalition was sworn in on 23 November. In April 2017, Tsahkna announced that he would not seek re-election as chairman. He was followed by Helir-Valdor Seeder on 13 May 2017. On 26 June 2017, Tsahkna and MP Marko Mihkelson announced that they were leaving the party, dropping the amount of IRL MPs to 12.

After the 2019 parliamentary election, Isamaa joined government with Centre Party and Estonian Conservative People's Party. This government collapsed in January 2021, when Jüri Ratas resigned as prime minister.

In 2021, tensions over cooperation with EKRE within the party became public and caused split. Dissenters in August 2022, formed Parempoolsed (Right–wingers).

By July 2022, Centre Party was expelled from the governmental positions. As a result, the government, led by Kaja Kallas of Reform Party, briefly governed in minority. After negotiations with the Social Democratic Party and the Isamaa, a new coalition was formed. Minister of Foreign Affairs, Urmas Reinsalu of Isamaa, became Estonia's deputy prime minister.

=== 2023–present ===
In the 2023 parliamentary election, Isamaa received 8.21% of the vote and won 8 seats.

In April 2023, the new cabinet of Prime Minister Kallas was made up of the Reform Party, the centrist Estonia 200 party and the Social Democratic Party; Isamaa became an opposition party.

Starting from August 2023, Isamaa saw its support rocket to unprecedented historic highs. These gains in polling were mainly attributed to the party gaining three MPs and several other members defecting from the Centre Party, EKRE being seen as too extreme of an option as an alternative to the government coalition and the success of the newly elected party leader, Urmas Reinsalu, in attracting disgruntled Reform Party voters unhappy with its plans to raise taxes. In June 2024, Isamaa was the highest polling party in Estonia and won the European parliament elections with 21.50% of the vote.

== Election results ==
=== Parliamentary elections ===
Election	Leader	Votes	%	Seats	+/–	Status
2007	Tõnis Lukas; Taavi Veskimägi	98,347	17.87 (#3)	19 / 101	New	Coalition
2011	Mart Laar	118,023	20.52 (#3)	23 / 101	▲4	Coalition (2011–2014)
2011	Mart Laar	118,023	20.52 (#3)	23 / 101	▲4	Opposition (2014–2015)
2015	Urmas Reinsalu	78,699	13.71 (#4)	14 / 101	▼9	Coalition
2019	Helir-Valdor Seeder	64,239	11.44 (#4)	12 / 101	▼2	Coalition (2019–2021)
2019	Helir-Valdor Seeder	64,239	11.44 (#4)	12 / 101	▼2	Opposition (2021–2022)
2019	Helir-Valdor Seeder	64,239	11.44 (#4)	12 / 101	▼2	Coalition (2022–2023)
2023	Helir-Valdor Seeder	50,118	8.21 (#6)	8 / 101	▼4	Opposition

=== European Parliament elections ===
Election	List leader	Votes	%	Seats	+/–	EP Group
2009	Tunne-Väldo Kelam	48,492	12.22 (#4)	1 / 6	New	EPP
2014	Tunne-Väldo Kelam	45,765	13.93 (#3)	1 / 6	Steady	EPP
2019	Riho Terras	34,189	10.29 (#5)	1 / 7	Steady	EPP
2024	Riho Terras	79,170	21.51 (#1)	2 / 7	▲1	EPP

== Chairmen ==
- Taavi Veskimägi (Res Publica) and Tõnis Lukas (Pro Patria) (2006–2007)
- Mart Laar (2007–2012)
- Urmas Reinsalu (2012–2015 and from 2023)
- Margus Tsahkna (2015–2017)
- Helir-Valdor Seeder (2017–2023)

== See also ==
- Category:Isamaa politicians
- List of political parties in Estonia
