= Res Publica Party =

Estonian political party

Res Publica Party Erakond Res Publica
- Leader: Taavi Veskimägi
- Founded: 8 December 2001
- Dissolved: 4 June 2006
- Merged into: Pro Patria and Res Publica Union
- Headquarters: Narva mnt 7 Tallinn 10117
- Ideology: Liberal conservatism Conservatism; Liberalism; Populism; Economic liberalism Anti-corruption
- Political position: Centre to centre-right
- European affiliation: European People's Party
- European Parliament group: EPP–ED
- International affiliation: International Democrat Union
- Colours: Blue, Red

Website
- www.respublica.ee

Res Publica Party (Estonian: Erakond Res Publica) was a political party in Estonia that self-identified as conservative. Established as a party on 8 December 2001, the political organisation Res Publica was founded already as early as 1989 and existed as a community of young conservatives, mostly associated with the Pro Patria Union party during the 1990s. Res Publica was a member of the EPP (European People's Party) on the European level. It merged with Pro Patria Union in 2006 to form the Pro Patria and Res Publica Union.

The party was founded under the name Union for the Republic – Res Publica (Ühendus vabariigi eest – Res Publica), but was commonly referred to as simply Res Publica and changed its name to Res Publica Party.

The party won its first parliamentary elections (in 2003) after being established. Their election slogans were "Vote for new politics" ("Vali uus poliitika") and "Choose order" ("Vali kord"). They formed a coalition with the Reform Party and the People's Union. The coalition broke in 2005 as a result of opposition to the policies of Res Publica's minister of justice Vaher.

At the time of its merging with Pro Patria, it was led by Taavi Veskimägi, a former Minister of Finance. The previous chairman Juhan Parts was also Prime Minister from 10 April 2003 until 23 March 2005. Until the 2007 parliamentary elections, Res Publica was the largest party in the Riigikogu, with 28 of 101 seats.

On 4 April 2006, representatives of the Pro Patria Union and the representatives of Res Publica decided to merge the two parties. A decision was made to form a new party, named Pro Patria and Res Publica Union (Isamaa ja Res Publica Liit), after approval by general assemblies of both merging political forces. Approval was given by the general assemblies on 4 June 2006. The union took third place in the 2007 elections, which, though they resulted in a loss in the combined parties' strength in Parliament, was a stronger than expected showing.
