= 10th Riigikogu =

Parliament of Estonia 2003–2007

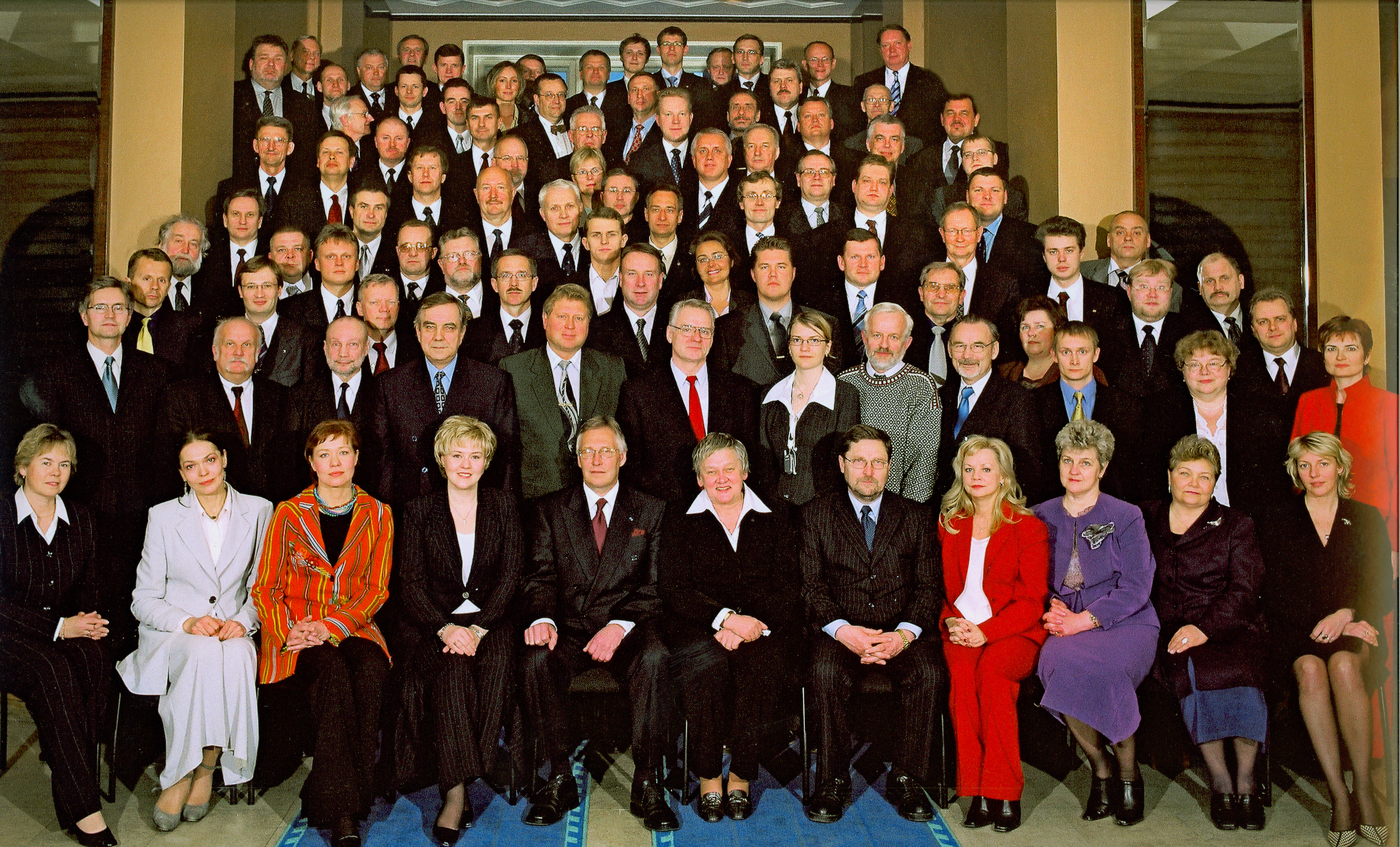
X Riigikogu

The 10th Riigikogu was the tenth legislature of the Estonian Parliament (Riigikogu). The legislature was elected after 2003 election.

== Election results ==
Party	Votes	%	Seats	+/–
Estonian Centre Party ^{[a]}	125,709	25.4	28	0
Res Publica Party	121,856	24.6	28	New
Estonian Reform Party	87,551	17.7	19	+1
People's Union of Estonia ^{[b]}	64,463	13.0	13	+6
Pro Patria Union	36,169	7.3	7	–11
Moderate People's Party	34,837	7.0	6	–11
Estonian United People's Party	11,113	2.2	0	–6
Estonian Christian People's Party	5,725	1.1	0	0
Estonian Independence Party	2,705	0.5	0	New
Social Democratic Labour Party	2,059	0.4	0	New
Russian Party in Estonia ^{[c]}	990	0.2	0	0
Independents	2,161	0.4	0	0
Invalid/blank votes	5,798	–	–	–
Total	500,686	100	101	0
Registered voters/turnout	859,714	58.2	–	–
Source: Nohlen & Stöver

== Officers ==
Speaker of the Riigikogu: Ene Ergma.
