= Riigikogu electoral district no. 4 =

Electoral district of Estonia

Electoral district no. 4
- Valimisringkond nr 4
- Electoral District for the Riigikogu
- Location of Electoral district no. 4 within Estonia
- County: Harju; Rapla
- Population: 200,692 (2020)
- Electorate: 133,437 (2019)

Current Electoral District
- Created: 1992
- Seats: List: 15 (2019–present); 14 (2011–2019); 13 (2007–2011); 12 (1999–2007); 11 (1995–1999); 10 (1992–1995)
- Member of the Riigikogu: List: Heiki Hepner (I); Kaido Höövelson (K); Kaja Kallas (RE); Rene Kokk (EKRE); Marko Mihkelson (RE); Madis Milling (RE); Siim Pohlak (EKRE); Henn Põlluaas (EKRE); Paul Puustusmaa (EKRE); Kai Rimmel (EKRE); Aivar Sõerd (RE); Mart Võrklaev (RE)

Electoral district no. 4 (Estonian: Valimisringkond nr 4) is one of the 12 multi-member electoral districts of the Riigikogu, the national legislature of Estonia. The district was established as electoral district no. 5 in 1992 when the Riigikogu was re-established following Estonia's independence from the Soviet Union. It was renamed electoral district no. 4 in 1995 following the re-organisation of electoral districts. It is conterminous with the counties of Harju (excluding Tallinn which has its own electoral districts) and Rapla. The district currently elects 15 of the 101 members of the Riigikogu using the open party-list proportional representation electoral system. At the 2019 parliamentary election it had 133,437 registered electors.

== Electoral system ==
Electoral district no. 4 currently elects 15 of the 101 members of the Riigikogu using the open party-list proportional representation electoral system. The allocation of seats is carried out in three stages. In the first stage, any individual candidate, regardless of whether they are a party or independent candidate, who receives more votes than the district's simple quota (Hare quota: valid votes in district/number of seats allocated to district) is elected via a personal mandate. In the second stage, district mandates are allocated to parties by dividing their district votes by the district's simple quota. Only parties that reach the 5% national threshold compete for district mandates and any personal mandates won by the party are subtracted from the party's district mandates. Prior to 2003 if a party's surplus/remainder votes was equal to or greater than 75% of the district's simple quota it received one additional district mandate. Any unallocated district seats are added to a national pool of compensatory seats. In the final stage, compensatory mandates are calculated based on the national vote and using a modified D'Hondt method. Only parties that reach the 5% national threshold compete for compensatory seats and any personal and district mandates won by the party are subtracted from the party's compensatory mandates. Though calculated nationally, compensatory mandates are allocated at the district level.

=== Seats ===
Seats allocated to electoral district no. 4 by the National Electoral Committee of Estonia at each election was as follows:

- 2023 - 16
- 2019 - 15
- 2015 - 14
- 2011 - 14
- 2007 - 13
- 2003 - 12
- 1999 - 12
- 1995 - 11
- 1992 - 10

== Election results ==
=== Summary ===
Election	Left EÜVP/EVP/ESDTP/Õ/V			Constitution K/EÜRP/MKOE			Social Democrats SDE/RM/M			Greens EER/NJ/R			Centre K/R			Reform RE			Isamaa I/IRL/I/I\ERSP/I			Conservative People's EKRE/ERL/EME/KMÜ		
Election	Votes	%	Seats	Votes	%	Seats	Votes	%	Seats	Votes	%	Seats	Votes	%	Seats	Votes	%	Seats	Votes	%	Seats	Votes	%	Seats
2023	1,334	1.26%	0				7,483	7.09%	1	747	0.71%	0	10,724	10.16%	1	42,277	40.04%	6	8,796	8.33%	1	15,380	14.57%	2
2019	83	0.09%	0				7,621	8.40%	1	1,686	1.86%	0	13,681	15.08%	2	34,571	38.10%	5	10,094	11.13%	1	16,638	18.34%	3
2015	351	0.40%	0				10,902	12.42%	1	836	0.95%	0	12,397	14.12%	2	30,924	35.23%	5	14,484	16.50%	2	7,050	8.03%	1
2011							11,759	13.48%	2	4,107	4.71%	0	11,184	12.82%	2	34,469	39.50%	5	19,389	22.22%	3	955	1.09%	0
2007	52	0.07%	0	1,116	1.44%	0	6,493	8.37%	1	7,609	9.81%	1	12,897	16.62%	2	29,535	38.06%	5	15,108	19.47%	2	3,060	3.94%	0
2003	168	0.27%	0	1,145	1.85%	0	4,157	6.71%	1				11,895	19.19%	2	14,407	23.25%	3	4,342	7.01%	1	6,685	10.79%	1
1999				1,646	2.98%	0	13,279	24.00%	2				11,653	21.06%	2	10,070	18.20%	2	7,614	13.76%	1	3,938	7.12%	0
1995	536	0.90%	0	2,019	3.39%	0	12,424	20.84%	1	417	0.70%	0	6,990	11.72%	1	9,653	16.19%	1	2,717	4.56%	0	17,673	29.64%	3
1992	2,746	5.91%	0				6,431	13.83%	1	2,569	5.53%	0	4,333	9.32%	0				9,837	21.16%	2			

(Excludes compensatory seats)

=== Detailed ===
Party has received at least 5% of the vote nationally and is entitled to compete for district seats.

==== 2023 ====
Results of the 2023 parliamentary election held on 5 March 2023:

Party		Votes per county				Total Votes	%	Seats			
Party		Harju	Rapla	Expat- riates	Elec- tronic	Total Votes	%	Per.	Dis.	Com.	Tot.
Estonian Reform Party	REF	9,126	1,968	58	30,464	42,277	40.04%	1	5	1	7
Conservative People's Party of Estonia	EKRE	7,328	2,948	133	4,551	15,380	14.57%	0	2	1	3
Estonia 200	EE200	3,723	899	17	9,567	14,423	13.66%	0	2	0	2
Estonian Centre Party	KESK	5,122	1,214	14	4,020	10,724	10.16%	1	0	0	1
Isamaa	I	2,885	1,080	14	4,666	8,796	8.33%	0	1	0	1
Social Democratic Party	SDE	2,112	501	13	4,709	7,483	7.09%	0	1	0	1
Parempoolsed		1,050	244	1	2,213	3,544	3.36%	0	0	0	0
Estonian United Left Party	EÜVP	955	37	9	281	1,334	1.26%	0	0	0	0
Vladas Radvilavičius (Independent)		268	109	2	428	816	0.77%	0	0	0	0
Estonian Greens	EER	272	45	3	404	747	0.71%	0	0	0	0
Kaido Kookmaa (Independent)		20	5	1	7	33	0.03%	0	0	0	0
Vello Kookmaa (Independent)		15	2	0	12	29	0.03%	0	0	0	0
Valid votes		32,876	9,032	264	61,322	105,586	100.00%	2	11	2	15
Rejected votes		319	101	5	0	489	0.46%				
Total polled		33,195	9,133	269	61,322	106,075	70.14%				
Registered electors		106,671	25,918	848		151,230					

The following candidates were elected:

- Personal mandates - Kaja Kallas (REF), 31,816 votes; and Jüri Ratas (KESK), 7,672 votes.
- District mandates - Lauri Hussar (EE200), 3,343 votes; Marina Kaljurand (SDE), 4,145 votes; Urmas Reinsalu (IE), 4,509 votes; Marko Mihkelson (REF), 2,640 votes; Mario Kadastik (REF), 962 votes; Siim Pohlak (EKRE), 4,223 votes; Henn Põlluaas (EKRE), 5,781 votes; Aivar Sõerd (REF), 1,248 votes; Timo Suslov (REF), 1,033 votes; Kristina Šmigun-Vähi (REF), 1,005 votes; Toomas Uibo (EE200), 2,420 votes;.
- Compensatory mandates - Rene Kokk (EKRE), 1,016 votes; and Mart Võrklaev (REF), 908 votes.

==== 2019 ====
Results of the 2019 parliamentary election held on 3 March 2019:

Party		Votes per county				Total Votes	%	Seats			
Party		Harju	Rapla	Expat- riates	Elec- tronic	Total Votes	%	Per.	Dis.	Com.	Tot.
Estonian Reform Party	RE	10,374	2,050	43	22,104	34,571	38.10%	1	4	0	5
Conservative People's Party of Estonia	EKRE	7,531	2,863	129	6,115	16,638	18.34%	1	2	1	4
Estonian Centre Party	K	7,873	1,860	17	3,931	13,681	15.08%	1	1	0	2
Isamaa	I	3,548	1,218	24	5,304	10,094	11.13%	0	1	0	1
Social Democratic Party	SDE	2,610	822	23	4,166	7,621	8.40%	0	1	0	1
Estonia 200		1,272	217	9	2,171	3,669	4.04%	0	0	0	0
Estonian Greens	EER	642	116	8	920	1,686	1.86%	0	0	0	0
Estonian Biodiversity Party		483	163	3	794	1,443	1.59%	0	0	0	0
Estonian Free Party	EVA	498	114	3	463	1,078	1.19%	0	0	0	0
Risto Nahkor (Independent)		59	13	0	36	108	0.12%	0	0	0	0
Estonian United Left Party	EÜVP	47	4	1	31	83	0.09%	0	0	0	0
Kaido Kookmaa (Independent)		11	5	0	13	29	0.03%	0	0	0	0
Vello Kookmaa (Independent)		16	1	0	11	28	0.03%	0	0	0	0
Valid votes		34,964	9,446	260	46,059	90,729	100.00%	3	9	1	13
Rejected votes		373	104	5	0	482	0.53%				
Total polled		35,337	9,550	265	46,059	91,211	68.36%				
Registered electors		106,671	25,918	848		133,437					

The following candidates were elected:

- Personal mandates - Kaja Kallas (RE), 20,072 votes; Henn Põlluaas (EKRE), 7,390 votes; and Jüri Ratas (K), 9,702 votes.
- District mandates - Vladimir Arhipov (K), 944 votes; Marina Kaljurand (SDE), 5,504 votes; Rene Kokk (EKRE), 1,458 votes; Jüri Luik (I), 4,806 votes; Marko Mihkelson (RE), 3,655 votes; Madis Milling (RE), 2,310 votes; Kalle Palling (RE), 1,655 votes; Siim Pohlak (EKRE), 4,152 votes; and Aivar Sõerd (RE), 2,476 votes.
- Compensatory mandates - Paul Puustusmaa (EKRE), 419 votes.

==== 2015 ====
Results of the 2015 parliamentary election held on 1 March 2015:

Party		Votes per county				Total Votes	%	Seats			
Party		Harju	Rapla	Expat- riates	Elec- tronic	Total Votes	%	Per.	Dis.	Com.	Tot.
Estonian Reform Party	RE	14,060	3,395	42	13,427	30,924	35.23%	1	4	1	6
Pro Patria and Res Publica Union	IRL	6,061	2,018	34	6,371	14,484	16.50%	0	2	0	2
Estonian Centre Party	K	8,781	1,967	12	1,637	12,397	14.12%	1	1	0	2
Social Democratic Party	SDE	5,409	1,543	13	3,937	10,902	12.42%	0	1	1	2
Estonian Free Party	EVA	4,053	1,571	17	4,569	10,210	11.63%	1	0	0	1
Conservative People's Party of Estonia	EKRE	3,737	1,262	16	2,035	7,050	8.03%	0	1	0	1
Estonian Greens	EER	391	106	2	337	836	0.95%	0	0	0	0
Estonian United Left Party	EÜVP	309	9	0	33	351	0.40%	0	0	0	0
Party of People's Unity	RÜE	172	27	0	104	303	0.35%	0	0	0	0
Estonian Independence Party	EIP	92	25	0	16	133	0.15%	0	0	0	0
Ege Hirv (Independent)		53	31	0	26	110	0.13%	0	0	0	0
Jaak Vackermann (Independent)		44	7	0	28	79	0.09%	0	0	0	0
Valid votes		43,162	11,961	136	32,520	87,779	100.00%	3	9	2	14
Rejected votes		403	96	1	0	500	0.57%				
Total polled		43,565	12,057	137	32,520	88,279	68.40%				
Registered electors		101,446	27,485	137		129,068					

The following candidates were elected:

- Personal mandates - Jüri Ratas (K), 7,932 votes; Taavi Rõivas (RE), 15,881 votes; and Artur Talvik (EVA), 7,308 votes.
- District mandates - Yoko Alender (RE), 2,715 votes; Marko Mihkelson (IRL), 2,842 votes; Sven Mikser (SDE), 4,969 votes; Madis Milling (RE), 2,580 votes; Kalle Palling (RE), 1,917 votes; Juhan Parts (IRL), 4,208 votes; Henn Põlluaas (EKRE), 4,309 votes; Aivar Sõerd (RE), 2,047 votes; and Vladimir Velman (K), 1,294 votes.
- Compensatory mandates - Urve Palo (SDE), 2,028 votes; and Laine Randjärv (RE), 1,698 votes.

==== 2011 ====
Results of the 2011 parliamentary election held on 6 March 2011:

Party		Votes per county				Total Votes	%	Seats			
Party		Harju	Rapla	Expat- riates	Elec- tronic	Total Votes	%	Per.	Dis.	Com.	Tot.
Estonian Reform Party	RE	17,964	5,131	56	11,318	34,469	39.50%	2	3	1	6
Pro Patria and Res Publica Union	IRL	9,959	2,956	64	6,410	19,389	22.22%	1	2	0	3
Social Democratic Party	SDE	6,396	2,209	14	3,140	11,759	13.48%	0	2	0	2
Estonian Centre Party	K	8,261	1,620	6	1,297	11,184	12.82%	0	2	1	3
Estonian Greens	EER	2,318	571	7	1,211	4,107	4.71%	0	0	0	0
Leo Kunnas (Independent)		1,769	499	9	990	3,267	3.74%	0	0	0	0
People's Union of Estonia	ERL	538	248	0	169	955	1.09%	0	0	0	0
Siiri Sisask (Independent)		366	192	0	213	771	0.88%	0	0	0	0
Russian Party in Estonia	VEE	287	19	0	72	378	0.43%	0	0	0	0
Party of Estonian Christian Democrats	EKD	199	57	0	92	348	0.40%	0	0	0	0
Estonian Independence Party	EIP	154	50	1	52	257	0.29%	0	0	0	0
Priit Tammeraid (Independent)		90	18	0	55	163	0.19%	0	0	0	0
Aare Siir (Independent)		71	9	0	22	102	0.12%	0	0	0	0
Koit Luus (Independent)		33	9	0	15	57	0.07%	0	0	0	0
Ege Hirv (Independent)		21	10	0	18	49	0.06%	0	0	0	0
Valid votes		48,426	13,598	157	25,074	87,255	100.00%	3	9	2	14
Rejected votes		524	172	6	0	702	0.80%				
Total polled		48,950	13,770	163	25,074	87,957	67.52%				
Registered electors		101,211	28,896	163		130,270					

The following candidates were elected:

- Personal mandates - Andrus Ansip (RE), 18,967 votes; Kaja Kallas (RE), 7,153 votes; and Mart Laar (IRL), 9,541 votes.
- District mandates - Aare Heinvee (RE), 1,017 votes; Jüri Jaanson (RE), 1,178 votes; Marko Mihkelson (IRL), 3,943 votes; Kalle Palling (RE), 1,549 votes; Urve Palo (SDE), 5,875 votes; Mailis Reps (K), 2,639 votes; Aivar Riisalu (K), 2,189 votes; Reet Roos (IRL), 848 votes; and Karel Rüütli (SDE), 1,470 votes.
- Compensatory mandates - Kalev Lillo (RE), 474 votes; and Vladimir Velman (K), 2,016 votes.

==== 2007 ====
Results of the 2007 parliamentary election held on 4 March 2007:

Party		Votes per county				Total Votes	%	Seats			
Party		Harju	Rapla	Expat- riates	Elec- tronic	Total Votes	%	Per.	Dis.	Com.	Tot.
Estonian Reform Party	RE	21,576	5,876	29	2,054	29,535	38.06%	1	4	0	5
Pro Patria and Res Publica Union	IRL	10,837	2,870	77	1,324	15,108	19.47%	0	2	0	2
Estonian Centre Party	K	9,497	3,114	7	279	12,897	16.62%	0	2	0	2
Estonian Greens	EER	5,403	1,600	11	595	7,609	9.81%	0	1	1	2
Social Democratic Party	SDE	4,465	1,537	16	475	6,493	8.37%	0	1	0	1
People's Union of Estonia	ERL	1,657	1,296	0	107	3,060	3.94%	0	0	0	0
Party of Estonian Christian Democrats	EKD	955	322	5	57	1,339	1.73%	0	0	0	0
Constitution Party	K	1,084	13	0	19	1,116	1.44%	0	0	0	0
Estonian Independence Party	EIP	131	52	1	10	194	0.25%	0	0	0	0
Vello Burmeister (Independent)		79	26	0	8	113	0.15%	0	0	0	0
Russian Party in Estonia	VEE	70	10	0	2	82	0.11%	0	0	0	0
Estonian Left Party	EVP	38	10	0	4	52	0.07%	0	0	0	0
Valid votes		55,792	16,726	146	4,934	77,598	100.00%	1	10	1	12
Rejected votes		485	112	6	0	603	0.77%				
Total polled		56,277	16,838	152	4,934	78,201	65.38%				
Registered electors		90,837	28,614	152		119,603					

The following candidates were elected:

- Personal mandates - Andrus Ansip (RE), 22,540 votes.
- District mandates - Marko Mihkelson (IRL), 2,697 votes; Harri Õunapuu (RE), 962 votes; Siiri Oviir (K), 3,643 votes; Kalle Palling (RE), 714 votes; Mailis Reps (K), 3,000 votes; Rain Rosimannus (RE), 1,177 votes; Jaak Salumets (RE), 597 votes; Marek Strandberg (EER), 5668 votes; Liina Tõnisson (SDE), 2,363 votes; and Taavi Veskimägi (IRL), 5,790 votes.
- Compensatory mandates - Valdur Lahtvee (EER), 475 votes.

==== 2003 ====
Results of the 2003 parliamentary election held on 2 March 2003:

Party		Votes per county			Total Votes	%	Seats			
Party		Harju	Rapla	Expat- riates	Total Votes	%	Per.	Dis.	Com.	Tot.
Union for the Republic–Res Publica	ÜVE-RP	12,881	4,516	21	17,418	28.10%	1	2	1	4
Estonian Reform Party	RE	12,001	2,394	12	14,407	23.25%	1	2	0	3
Estonian Centre Party	K	8,110	3,782	3	11,895	19.19%	0	2	1	3
People's Union of Estonia	ERL	4,142	2,539	4	6,685	10.79%	0	1	0	1
Pro Patria Union Party	I	3,528	755	59	4,342	7.01%	0	1	0	1
Moderate People's Party	RM	3,272	877	8	4,157	6.71%	0	1	0	1
Estonian United People's Party	EÜRP	1,100	45	0	1,145	1.85%	0	0	0	0
Estonian Christian People's Party	EKRP	529	207	0	736	1.19%	0	0	0	0
Rein Haggi (Independent)		45	362	0	407	0.66%	0	0	0	0
Estonian Independence Party	EIP	233	68	0	301	0.49%	0	0	0	0
Estonian Social Democratic Labour Party	ESDTP	120	47	1	168	0.27%	0	0	0	0
Russian Party in Estonia	VEE	124	8	0	132	0.21%	0	0	0	0
Mart Riisenberg (Independent)		89	23	0	112	0.18%	0	0	0	0
Hasso Nurm (Independent)		57	16	0	73	0.12%	0	0	0	0
Valid votes		46,231	15,639	108	61,978	100.00%	2	9	2	13
Rejected votes		516	158	3	677	1.08%				
Total polled		46,747	15,797	111	62,655	58.75%				
Registered electors		78,357	28,178	111	106,646					
Turnout		59.66%	56.06%	100.00%	58.75%					

The following candidates were elected:

- Personal mandates - Siim Kallas (RE), 10,008 votes; and Taavi Veskimägi (ÜVE-RP), 6,020 votes.
- District mandates - Tunne-Väldo Kelam (I), 2,808 votes; Leino Mägi (RE), 520 votes; Harri Õunapuu (K), 1,918 votes; Reet Roos (ÜVE-RP), 3,096 votes; Rain Rosimannus (RE), 600 votes; Tiit Tammsaar (ERL), 1,674 votes; Andres Tarand (RM), 2,356 votes; Liina Tõnisson (K), 3,643 votes; and Ülo Vooglaid (ÜVE-RP), 1,719 votes.
- Compensatory mandates - Värner Lootsmann (K), 295 votes; and Henn Pärn (ÜVE-RP), 946 votes.

==== 1999 ====
Results of the 1999 parliamentary election held on 7 March 1999:

Party		Votes per county			Total Votes	%	Seats			
Party		Harju	Rapla	Expat- riates	Total Votes	%	Per.	Dis.	Com.	Tot.
Moderate	M	9,660	3,565	54	13,279	24.00%	1	1	0	2
Estonian Centre Party	K	7,832	3,819	2	11,653	21.06%	0	2	0	2
Estonian Reform Party	RE	8,064	2,000	6	10,070	18.20%	1	1	0	2
Pro Patria Union	I	5,890	1,618	106	7,614	13.76%	0	1	1	2
Estonian Country People's Party	EME	1,953	1,981	4	3,938	7.12%	0	0	0	0
Estonian Coalition Party	KE	1,580	1,126	2	2,708	4.90%	0	0	1	1
Estonian United People's Party	EÜRP	1,576	70	0	1,646	2.98%	0	0	0	0
Estonian Christian People's Party	EKRP	1,171	378	1	1,550	2.80%	0	0	0	0
Russian Party in Estonia	VEE	741	72	0	813	1.47%	0	0	0	0
Estonian Blue Party	ESE	627	175	2	804	1.45%	0	0	0	0
Rein Haggi (Independent)		35	384	0	419	0.76%	0	0	0	0
Anne Taklaja (Independent)		328	47	1	376	0.68%	0	0	0	0
Progress Party		191	52	0	243	0.44%	0	0	0	0
Farmers' Assembly		139	48	1	188	0.34%	0	0	0	0
Lembit Kandrov (Independent)		13	6	0	19	0.03%	0	0	0	0
Valid votes		39,800	15,341	179	55,320	100.00%	2	5	2	9
Rejected votes		645	310	6	961	1.71%				
Total polled		40,445	15,651	185	56,281	57.44%				
Registered electors		69,482	28,315	185	97,982					
Turnout		58.21%	55.27%	100.00%	57.44%					

The following candidates were elected:

- Personal mandates - Toivo Asmer (RE), 5,590 votes; and Andres Tarand (M), 11,112 votes.
- District mandates - Jürgen Ligi (RE), 1,025 votes; Harri Õunapuu (K), 4,137 votes; Jaana Padrik (I), 4,299 votes; Viive Rosenberg (K), 2,508 votes; and Jüri Tamm (M), 471 votes.
- Compensatory mandates - Sirje Endre (I), 577 votes; and Arvo Sirendi (KE), 939 votes.

==== 1995 ====
Results of the 1995 parliamentary election held on 5 March 1995:

Party		Votes per county			Total Votes	%	Seats			
Party		Harju	Rapla	Expat- riates	Total Votes	%	Per.	Dis.	Com.	Tot.
Coalition Party and Rural People's Association	KMÜ	9,875	7,781	17	17,673	29.64%	0	3	0	3
Moderate	M	9,549	2,779	96	12,424	20.84%	1	0	0	1
Estonian Reform Party	RE	7,437	2,166	50	9,653	16.19%	0	1	0	1
Estonian Centre Party	K	4,954	2,031	5	6,990	11.72%	0	1	1	2
Pro Patria and ERSP Union	I\ERSP	1,932	583	202	2,717	4.56%	0	0	0	0
Our Home is Estonia	MKOE	1,873	146	0	2,019	3.39%	0	0	0	0
The Right Wingers	P	1,475	442	21	1,938	3.25%	0	0	0	0
Estonian Farmers' Party	ETRE	894	502	5	1,401	2.35%	0	0	0	0
Better Estonia/Estonian Citizen	PE/EK	973	309	5	1,287	2.16%	0	0	0	0
Estonian Future Party	TEE	913	328	7	1,248	2.09%	0	0	0	0
Forest Party		453	120	4	577	0.97%	0	0	0	0
Justice	Õ	385	151	0	536	0.90%	0	0	0	0
Fourth Force	NJ	255	154	8	417	0.70%	0	0	0	0
Estonian National Federation	ERKL	217	75	1	293	0.49%	0	0	0	0
Jüri-Rajur Liivak (Independent)		152	84	0	236	0.40%	0	0	0	0
Blue Party	SE	142	40	0	182	0.31%	0	0	0	0
Estonian Democratic Union	EDL	27	3	0	30	0.05%	0	0	0	0
Valid votes		41,506	17,694	421	59,621	100.00%	1	5	1	7
Rejected votes		355	171	0	526	0.87%				
Total polled		41,861	17,865	421	60,147	69.38%				
Registered electors		60,096	26,173	421	86,690					
Turnout		69.66%	68.26%	100.00%	69.38%					

The following candidates were elected:

- Personal mandates - Andres Tarand (M), 11,422 votes.
- District mandates - Lembit Arro (KMÜ), 2,480 votes; Rein Karemäe (K), 2,802 votes; Paul-Eerik Rummo (RE), 4,592 votes; Arvo Sirendi (KMÜ), 5,233 votes; and Ülo Vooglaid (KMÜ), 4,202 votes.
- Compensatory mandates - Olav Anton (K), 1,590 votes.

==== 1992 ====
Results of the 1992 parliamentary election held on 20 September 1992:

Party		Votes per county			Total Votes	%	Seats			
Party		Harju	Rapla	Expat- riates	Total Votes	%	Per.	Dis.	Com.	Tot.
Pro Patria	I	6,900	2,528	409	9,837	21.16%	1	1	1	3
Safe Home	KK	4,293	4,590	14	8,897	19.14%	0	1	2	3
Moderate	M	4,940	1,468	23	6,431	13.83%	0	1	2	3
Independent Kings	SK	3,382	1,339	6	4,727	10.17%	0	1	1	2
Popular Front of Estonia	R	2,698	1,606	29	4,333	9.32%	0	0	1	1
Left Option	V	1,994	751	1	2,746	5.91%	0	0	0	0
Greens	R	2,179	375	15	2,569	5.53%	0	0	0	0
Estonian National Independence Party	ERSP	1,243	659	103	2,005	4.31%	0	0	1	1
National Party of the Illegally Repressed	ÕRRE	944	231	8	1,183	2.54%	0	0	0	0
Estonian Citizen	EK	822	323	3	1,148	2.47%	0	0	0	0
Estonian Union of Pensioners	EPL	673	207	1	881	1.90%	0	0	0	0
Gunnar Piho (Independent)		147	367	1	515	1.11%	0	0	0	0
Peeter Ugand (Independent)		407	32	0	439	0.94%	0	0	0	0
Estonian Entrepreneurs' Party	EEE	250	77	4	331	0.71%	0	0	0	0
The Democrats		261	39	3	303	0.65%	0	0	0	0
Lembit Aulas (Independent)		76	67	0	143	0.31%	0	0	0	0
Valid votes		31,209	14,659	620	46,488	100.00%	1	4	8	13
Rejected votes		653	289	0	942	1.99%				
Total polled		31,862	14,948	620	47,430	67.05%				
Registered electors		46,851	23,249	634	70,734					
Turnout		68.01%	64.30%	97.79%	67.05%					

The following candidates were elected:

- Personal mandates - Mart Laar (I), 7,631 votes.
- District mandates - Lembit Arro (KK), 3,305 votes; Jaanus Betlem (I), 524 votes; Vambola Põder (SK), 4,153 votes; and Andres Tarand (M), 3,122 votes.
- Compensatory mandates - Olav Anton (R), 814 votes; Jaak Herodes (M), 423 votes; Karin Jaani (I), 277 votes; Rein Kikerpill (SK), 394 votes; Ivar Raig (M), 1,883 votes; Vardo Rumessen (ERSP), 816 votes; Arvo Sirendi (KK), 2,559 votes; and Ülo Vooglaid (KK), 1,414 votes.
