= 2007 Estonian parliamentary election =

- 4 March 2007

All 101 seats in the Riigikogu 51 seats needed for a majority
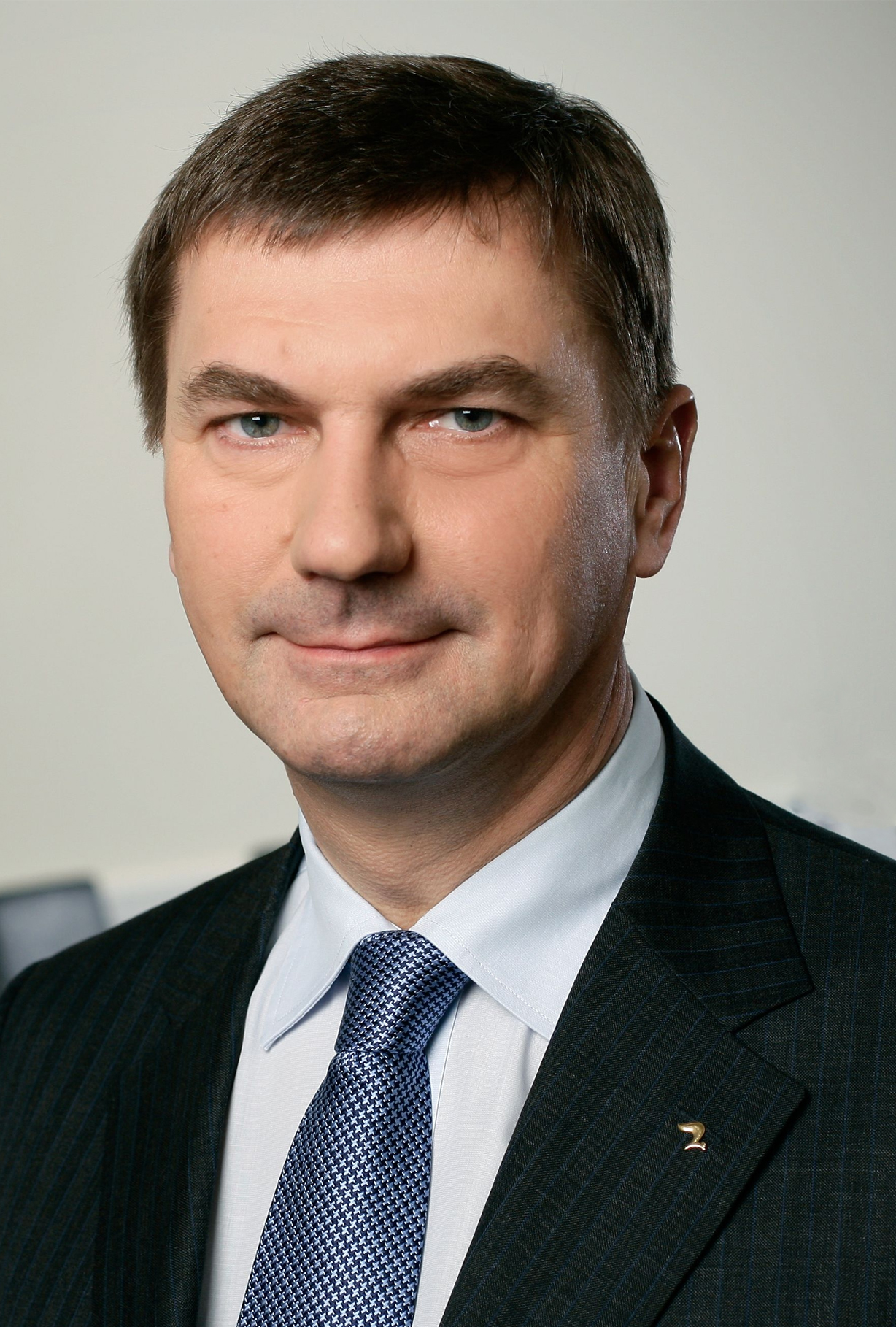

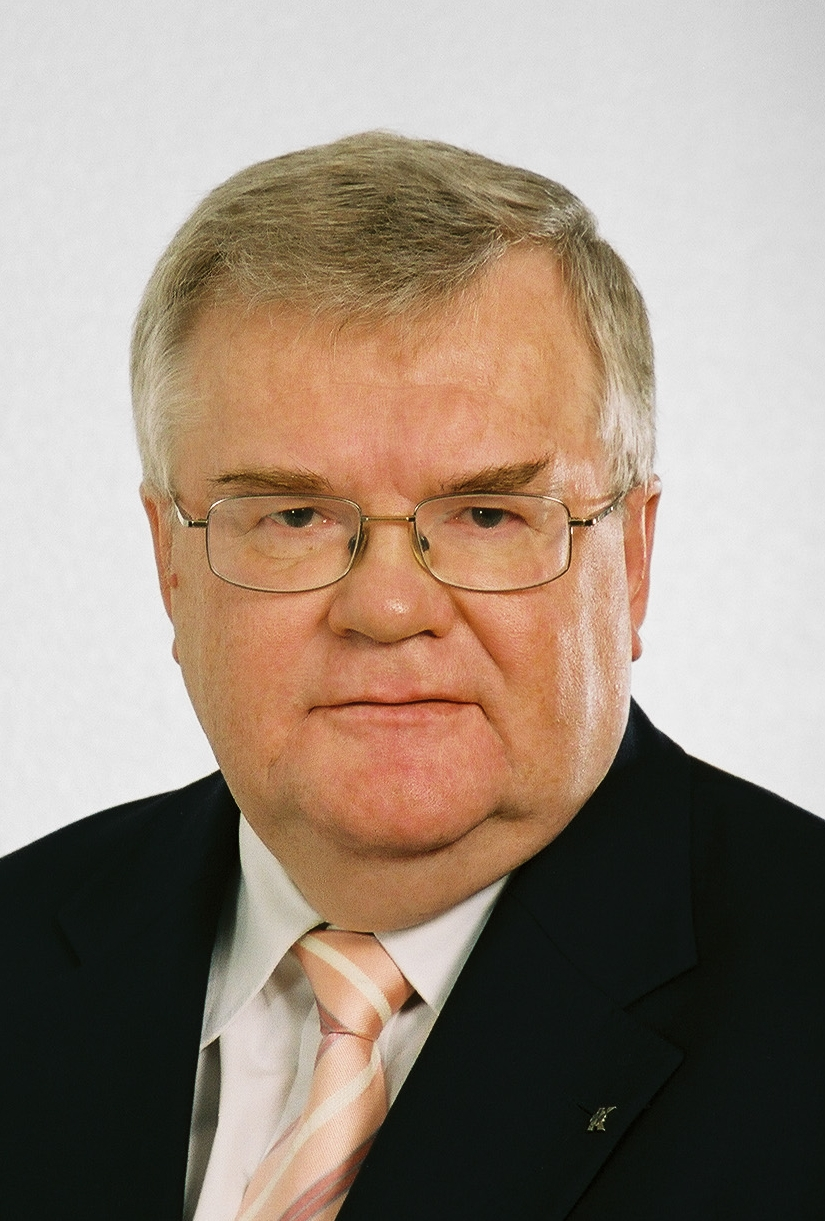

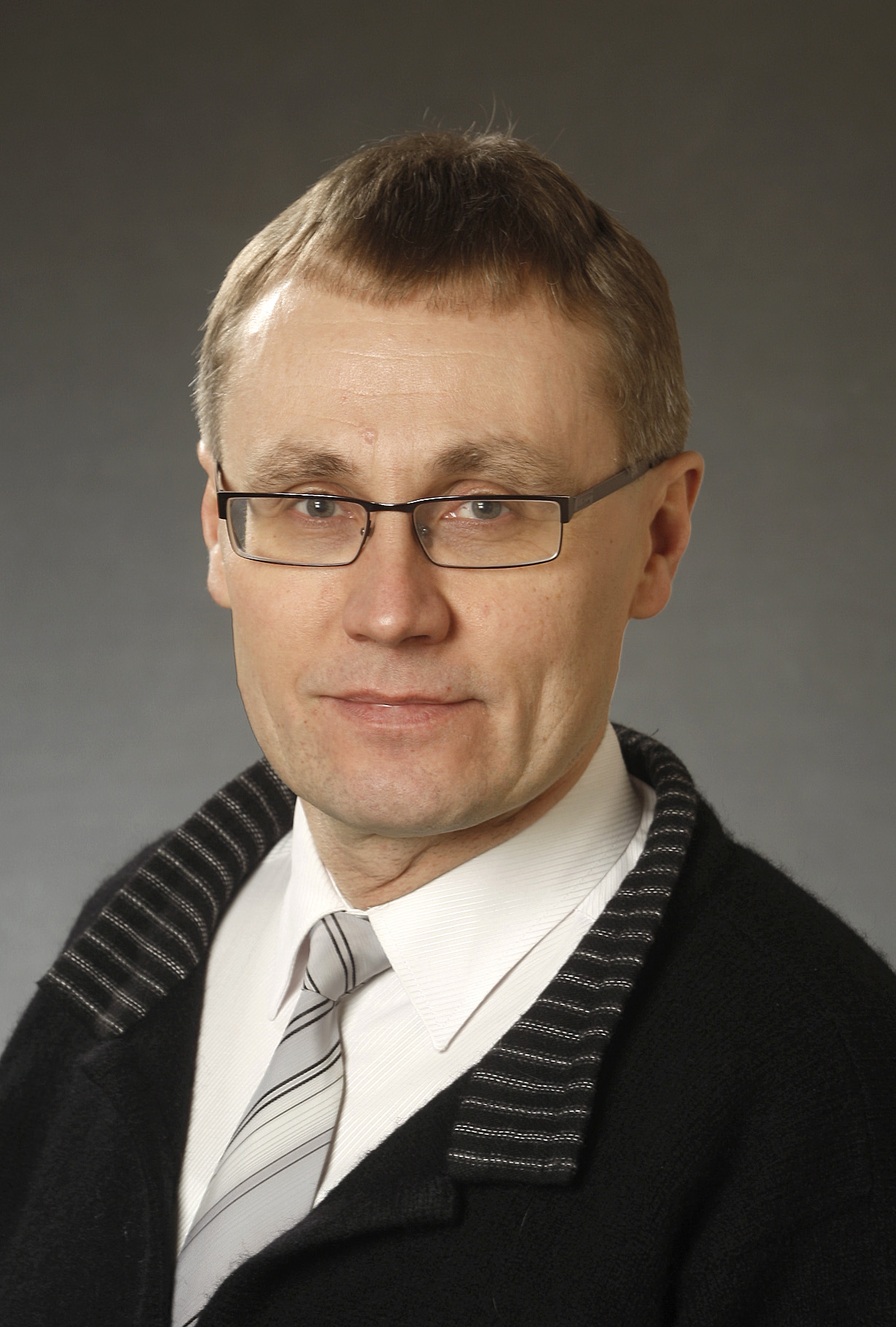

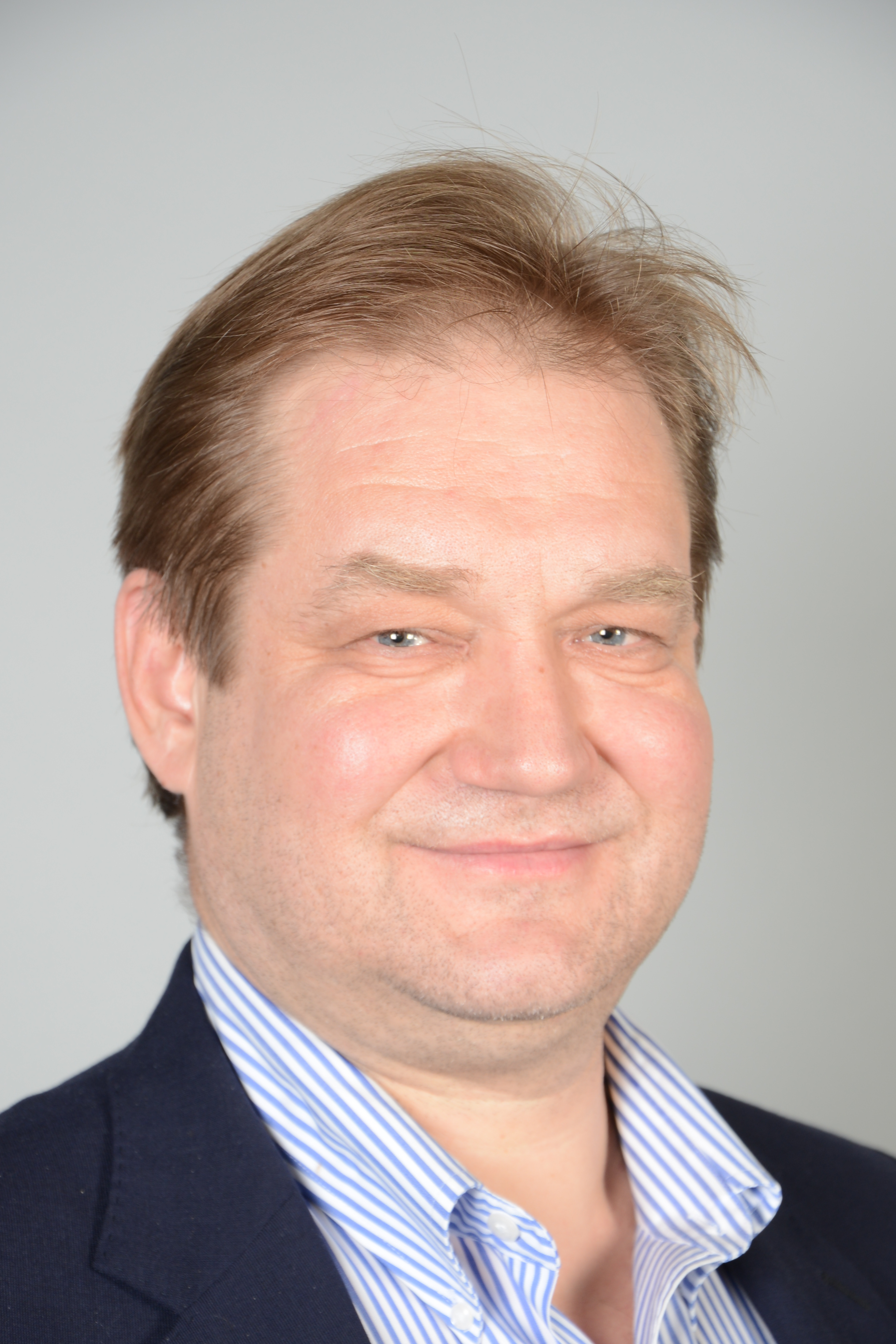

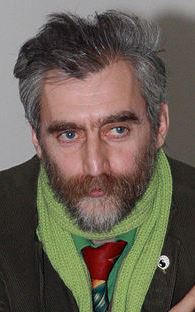

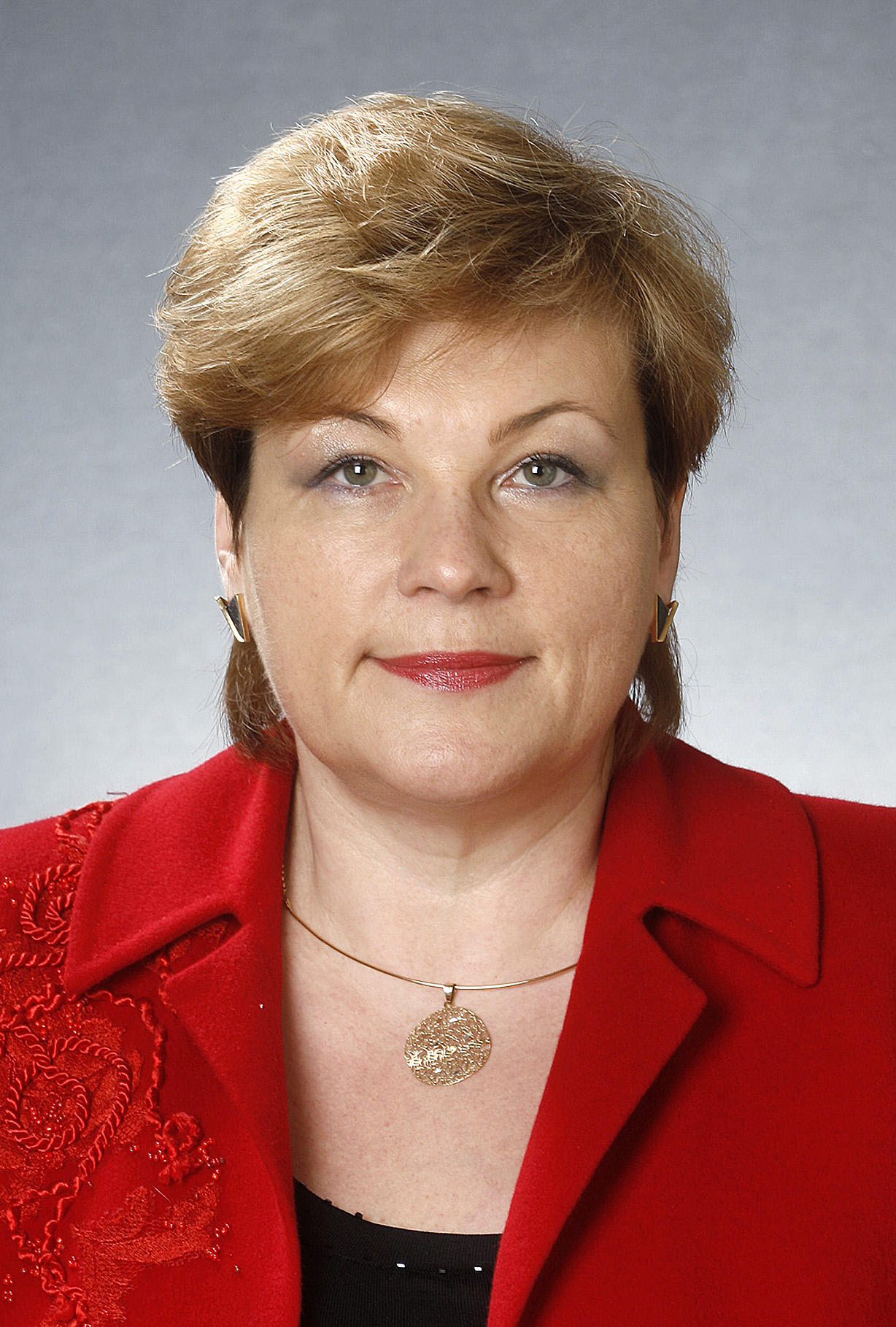
	First party	Second party	Third party
Leader	Andrus Ansip	Edgar Savisaar	Tõnis Lukas and Taavi Veskimägi
Party	Reform	Centre	IRL
Last election	19 seats	28 seats	32 seats
Seats won	31	29	19
Seat change	▲12	▲1	▼16 (Note: Combined results of the pre-merger Pro Patria Union and Res Publica Party.)
Popular vote	153,044	143,518	98,347
Percentage	27.8%	26.1%	17.9%
Swing	▲10.11pp	▲0.70pp	▼14.06pp
	Fourth party	Fifth party	Sixth party
Leader	Ivari Padar	Aleksei Lotman	Ester Tuiksoo
Party	SDE	Greens	People's Union
Last election	6 seats	–	13 seats
Seats won	10	6	6
Seat change	▲4	New	▼7
Popular vote	58,363	39,279	39,215
Percentage	10.6%	7.1%	7.1%
Swing	▲3.56pp	New	▼5.93pp
- Results by electoral district
Prime Minister before election
Andrus Ansip
Reform
Prime Minister after election
Andrus Ansip
Reform

Parliamentary elections were held in Estonia on 4 March 2007. The newly elected 101 members of the 11th Riigikogu assembled at Toompea Castle in Tallinn within ten days of the election. It was the world's first nationwide vote where part of the voting was carried out in the form of remote electronic voting via the internet.

The election saw the Estonian Reform Party emerge as the largest faction in the Riigikogu with 31 seats. The Estonian Centre Party finished second with 29 seats, whilst the new Union of Pro Patria and Res Publica lost 16 seats compared to the 35 won by the two parties in the 2003 elections. The Social Democrats gained 4 seats, whilst the Greens entered the Riigikogu for the first time with 6 seats and the People's Union lost seven of its 13 seats. This election would be the last time that the Greens and the People's Union (Note: In its current form, before being reconstructed into EKRE.) would enter into parliament. The Riigikogu elected after this election became the only one in contemporary Estonian history to have a single government (Note: De jure - the Social Democrats left the government midway throughout the term, which some consider the start of a new government despite a new mandate not being requested from the Riigikogu. See Andrus Ansip's second cabinet.) last throughout an entire parliamentary term.

After the election, the Centre Party, led by the mayor of Tallinn Edgar Savisaar, had been increasingly excluded from collaboration due to his open collaboration with Putin's United Russia party, real estate scandals in Tallinn, and the Bronze Soldier controversy, considered a deliberate attempt to split Estonian society by provoking the Russian minority.

== Background ==
After the 2003 election, the Centre and Res Publica parties nearly tied for first place, with both saying that they should get the chance to try and form the next government, while ruling out any deal between themselves. President Rüütel had to decide who he should nominate as Prime Minister and therefore be given the first chance at forming a government. On the 2 April he invited the leader of the Res Publica party, Juhan Parts to form a government and after negotiations a coalition government composed of Res Publica, the Reform Party and the People's Union was formed on the 10 April. The government has also been referred to as the Harmony coalition.

On 20 August 2004, Lihula municipality head Tiit Madisson erected the Lihula monument on the territory of the municipality, which represented a soldier in SS uniform. The national government had ordered the removal of the monument and by the evening of 2 September, the rescue services and the police had arrived to take down the monument. The takedown was secured by police with dogs and rubber batons but the locals started pelting the rescue services and police with stones. The police then threatened them with tear gas.

At the beginning of March, the Reform Party and the People's Union decided to present a motion of no confidence against the Minister of Justice Ken-Marti Vaher of Res Publica as part of the proposal by Res Publica to start using metrics to catch corrupt people. The Riigikogu voted no-confidence in Vaher with 54 votes in favor. After the vote, Prime Minister Juhan Parts said he would resign. On 24 March 2005, Juhan Parts submitted his resignation request to President Arnold Rüütel, and the government resigned.

Reform and the People's Union then entered negotiations with the Centre Party to form a new government. The new government took office on 13 April 2005 and left office after a new coalition was formed following the 2007 election. The government has also been called the garlic coalition due to the agreement being reached in the corresponding restaurant in Tallinn's Old Town.

On 15 November 2006 Res Publica and the Pro Patria Union officially merged into the Pro Patria and Res Publica Union (Erakond Isamaa ja Res Publica Liit - IRL).

== Campaign ==
=== Reform Party ===
During the campaign, Reform campaigned on lowering taxes as well as trying to paint itself as the main alternative to Centre which they painted in a Russophilic light, claiming the party "represents primarily Russians". The party's campaign also featured a promise to bring Estonia "among the five wealthiest countries in Europe" within 15 years. The claim has since been ridiculed by many as a promise that failed to materialize. In 2022, 15 years after the election campaign, then-Reform leader Andrus Ansip commented that the promise had simply been a slogan and an appeal, telling a journalist that "even you can understand that it's impossible".

=== Centre Party ===
Centre campaigned on wage increases, bringing troops home from Iraq, building municipal apartments and a Russian-language public broadcasting service. Moreover, the party promised free higher education. Both Reform and Centre published contrasting advertisements with yes-no tables listing policies that they claimed one party supported and the other did not.

=== IRL ===
IRL campaigned on promises such as providing a computer to every ninth-grader, increased welfare spending and wages as well as the construction of the War of Independence Victory Column. Moreover, the newly united party launched an ad campaign featuring endorsements of the party and one of its figureheads, former prime minister Mart Laar by various conservative European leaders, including Swedish foreign minister Carl Bildt, Georgian president Mikheil Saakashvili and British prime minister David Cameron.

== Electoral system ==
In 2007 Estonia held its and the world's first national Internet election. Voting was available from February 26 to 28. A total of 30,275 citizens (3.4%) used Internet voting.

Electronic voting in Estonia began in October 2005 local elections when Estonia became the first country to have legally binding general elections using the Internet as a means of casting the vote and was declared a success by the Estonian election officials.

The electoral system was a two-tier semi-open list proportional representation system with a 5% (27,510.65 votes for this election) election threshold.

=== Seats by electoral district ===
District number	Electoral District	Seats
1	Haabersti, Põhja-Tallinn and Kristiine districts in Tallinn	8
2	Kesklinn, Lasnamäe and Pirita districts in Tallinn	11
3	Mustamäe and Nõmme districts in Tallinn	8
4	Harjumaa (without Tallinn) and Raplamaa counties	13
5	Hiiumaa, Läänemaa and Saaremaa counties	7
6	Lääne-Virumaa county	6
7	Ida-Virumaa county	8
8	Järvamaa and Viljandimaa counties	8
9	Jõgevamaa and Tartumaa counties (without Tartu)	7
10	Tartu city	8
11	Võrumaa, Valgamaa and Põlvamaa counties	9
12	Pärnumaa county	8

== Contesting parties ==
The Estonian National Electoral Committee announced that 11 political parties and seven individual candidates registered to take part in the 2007 parliamentary election. Their registration numbers and order were determined by a draw lot, as opposed to the order of registration as was done previously.

#	Name	Ideology	Political position	Leader	Total candidates	2003 result	
#	Name	Ideology	Political position	Leader	Total candidates	Votes (%)	Seats
1	Christian Democrats	Christian democracy	Centre-right	Peeter Võsu	108	1.1%	0 / 101
2	Centre Party	Populism	Centre-left	Edgar Savisaar	125	25.4%	28 / 101
3	Reform Party	Classical liberalism	Centre-right	Andrus Ansip	125	17.7%	19 / 101
4	Independence Party	Estonian nationalism	Far-right	Vello Leito	10	0.6%	0 / 101
5	Left Party	Democratic socialism	Left-wing	Sirje Kingsepp	12	0.4%	0 / 101
6	IRL	Liberal conservatism	Centre-right	Tõnis Lukas and Taavi Veskimägi	125	31.9% (Note: Combined results of the pre-merger Pro Patria Union and Res Publica Party.)	35 / 101
7	Russian Party	Russian minority interests	Syncretic	Stanislav Tšerepanov	35	0.2%	0 / 101
8	Constitution Party	Russia's national interests	Centre-left	Sergei Jürgens	53	2.3%	0 / 101
9	People's Union	Agrarianism	Centre to centre-left	Ester Tuiksoo	125	13.0%	13 / 101
10	Social Democratic Party	Social democracy	Centre-left	Ivari Padar	125	7.0%	6 / 101
11	Greens	Green politics	Centre-left	Aleksei Lotman	125	did not exist	
—	Individual candidates	—			7	did not exist	

== Results ==
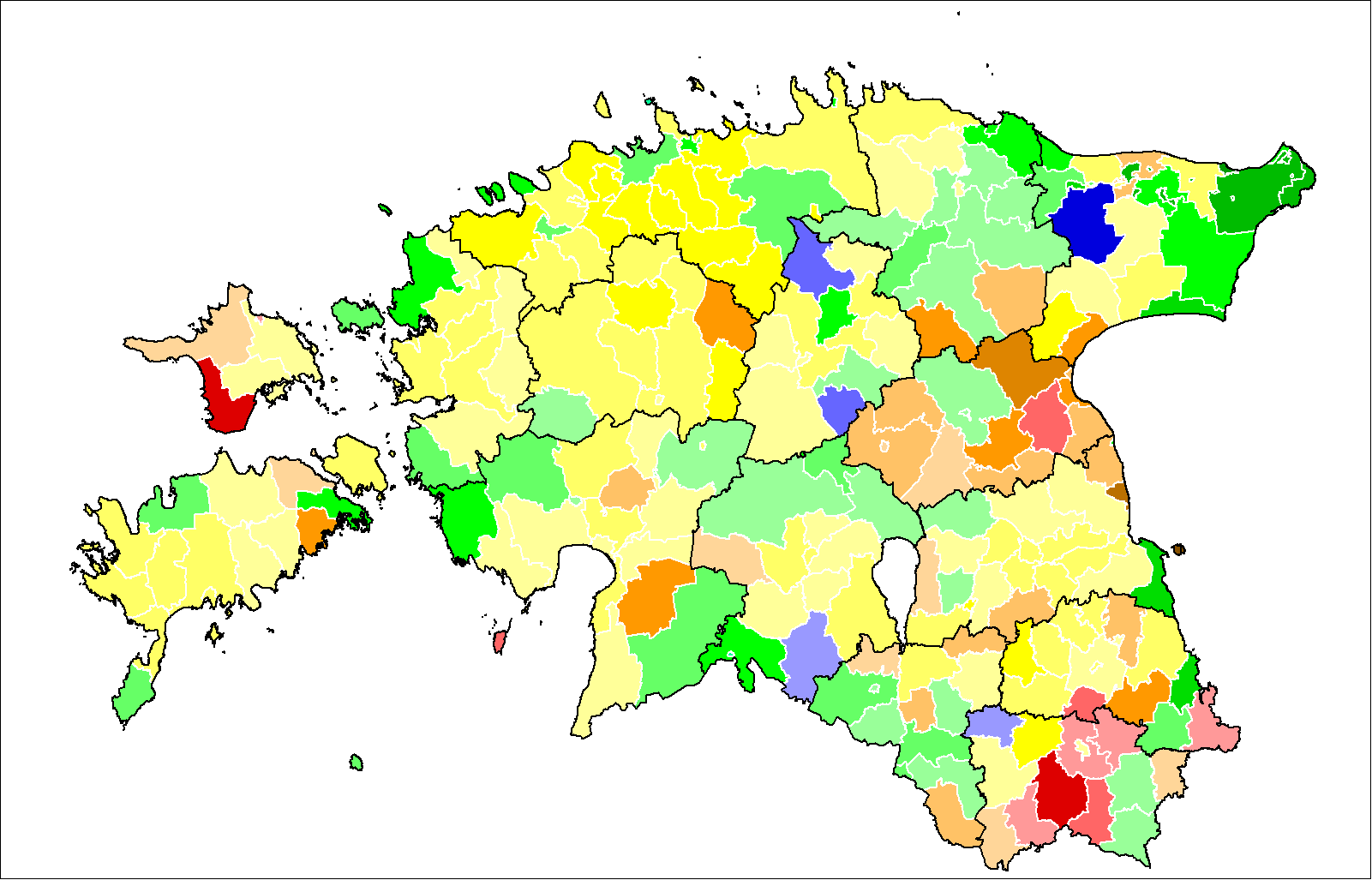
Leading party by municipality: ERE / EKE / IRL / SDE / ERL; 20–29% 30–39% 40–49% 50–59% / 20–29% 30–39% 40–49% 50–59% 60–69% 70–79% / 20–29% 30–39% 40–49% 50–59% / 20–29% 30–39% 40–49% 50–59% / 20–29% 30–39% 40–49% 50–59% 60–69% 80–89%

Party	Votes	%	Seats	+/–
Estonian Reform Party	153,044	27.82	31	+12
Estonian Centre Party	143,518	26.08	29	+1
Pro Patria and Res Publica Union	98,347	17.87	19	–16
Social Democratic Party	58,363	10.61	10	+4
Estonian Greens	39,279	7.14	6	New
People's Union of Estonia	39,215	7.13	6	–7
Party of Estonian Christian Democrats	9,456	1.72	0	0
Constitution Party	5,464	0.99	0	0
Estonian Independence Party	1,273	0.23	0	0
Russian Party in Estonia	1,084	0.20	0	0
Estonian Left Party	607	0.11	0	0
Independents	563	0.10	0	0
Total	550,213	100.00	101	0
Valid votes	550,213	99.05		
Invalid/blank votes	5,250	0.95		
Total votes	555,463	100.00		
Registered voters/turnout	897,243	61.91		
Source: Nohlen & Stöver, IPU

== Aftermath ==
Following the election a three party coalition government, also called the Triple Alliance, was formed between Reform, the Pro Patria and Res Publica Union and SDE. This lasted until May 2009, when SDE left the government following budget cuts as a result of the global economic crisis, the two remaining parties were able to carry on in government as a minority coalition however, holding 50 out of 101 seats in the Parliament.
