= 2003 Estonian parliamentary election =

- 2 March 2003

101 seats in the Riigikogu 51 seats needed for a majority
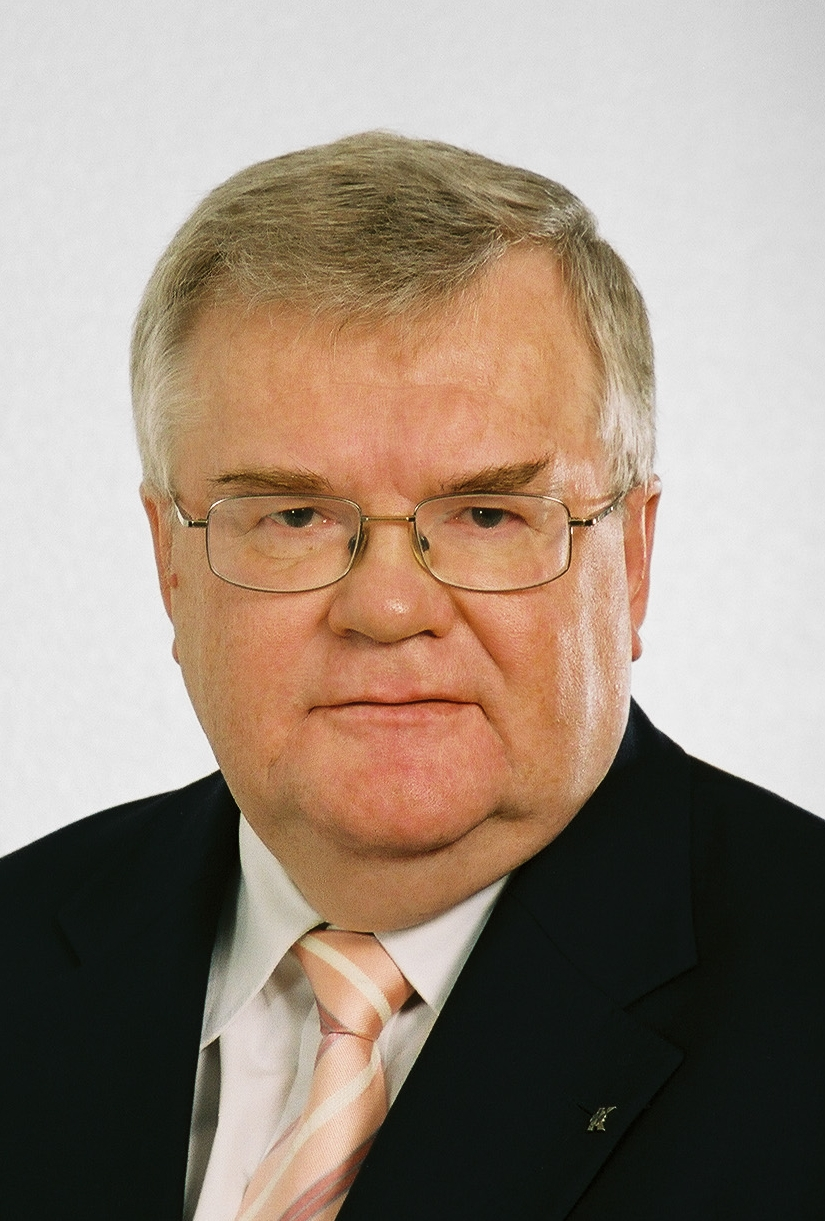

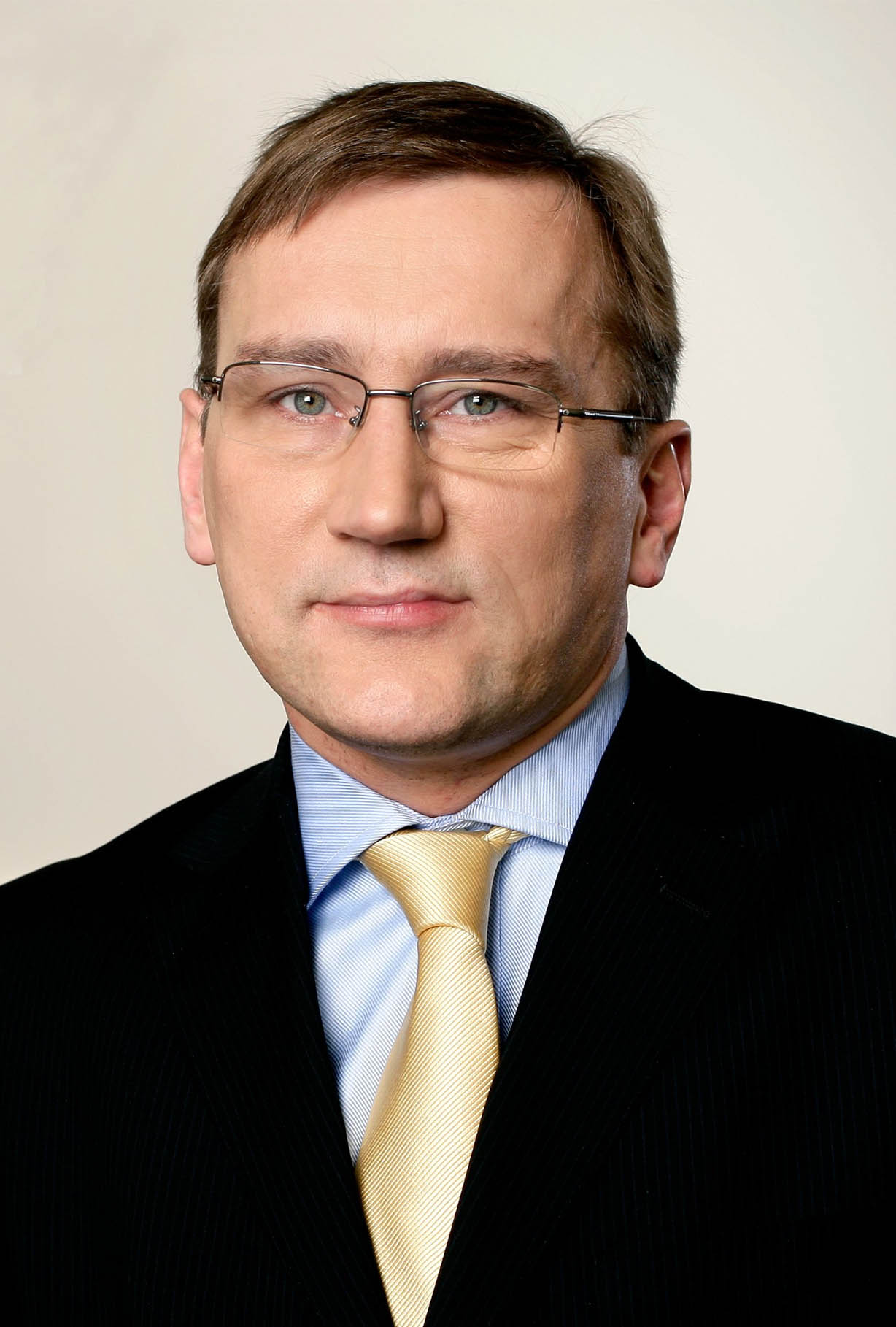

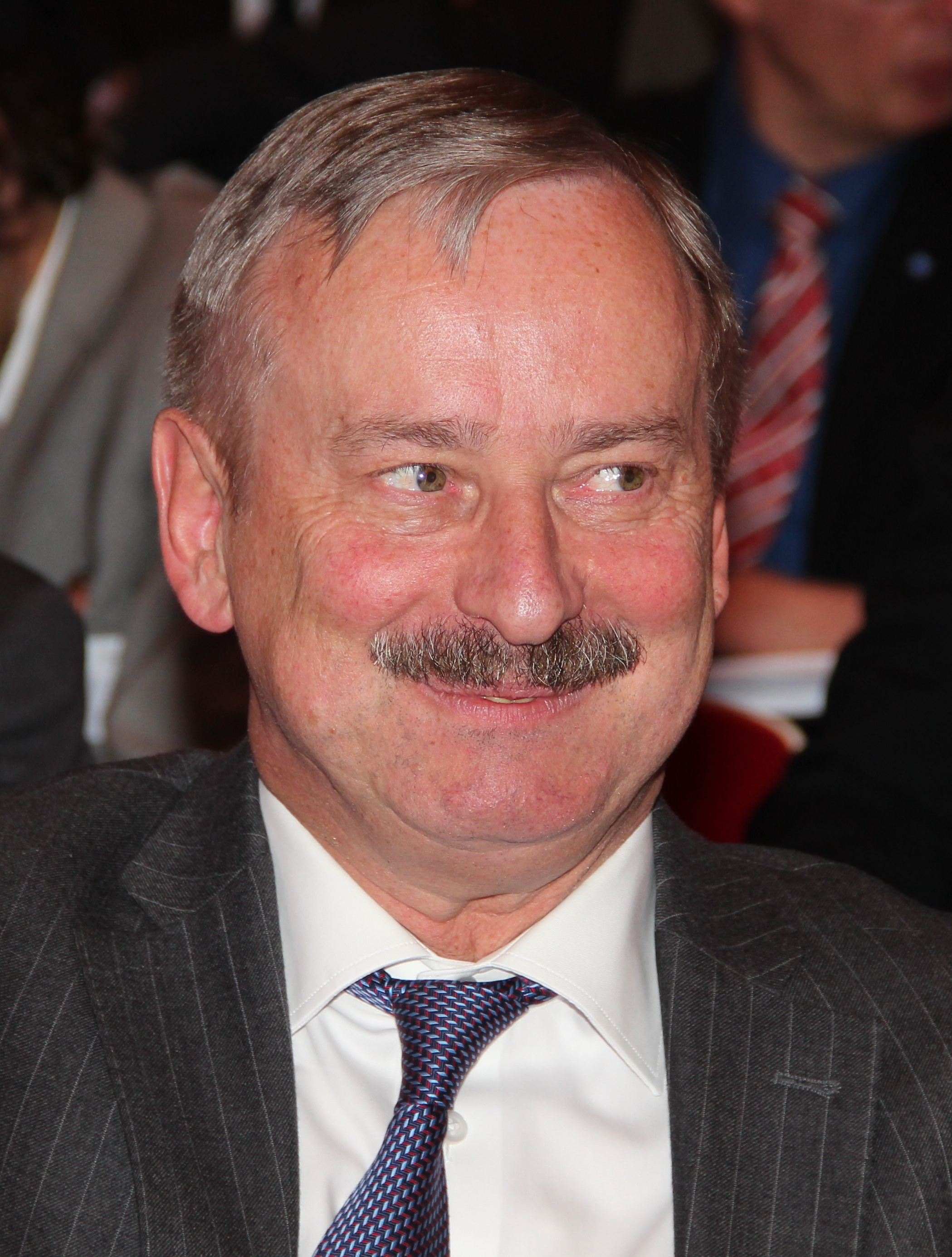

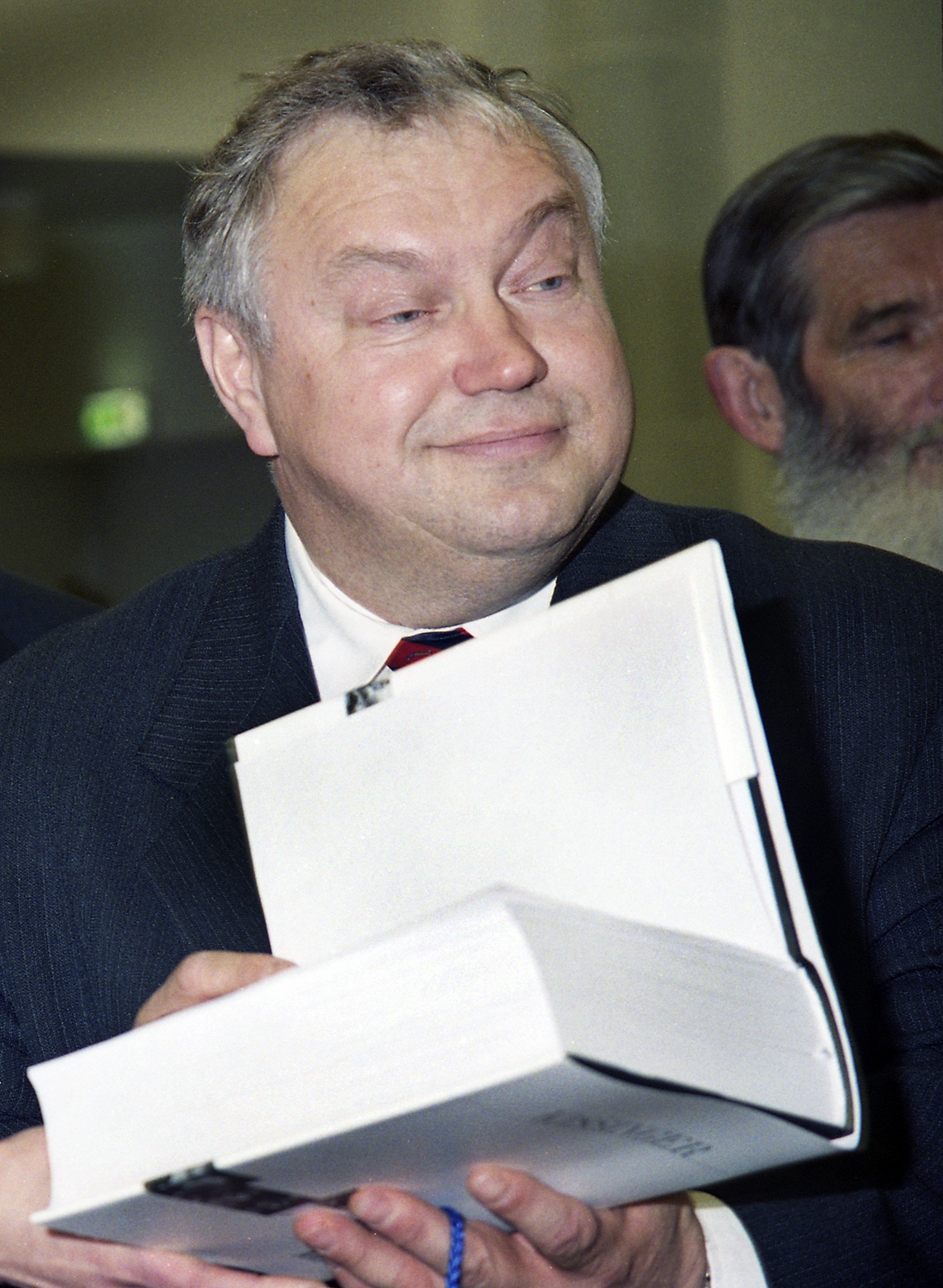

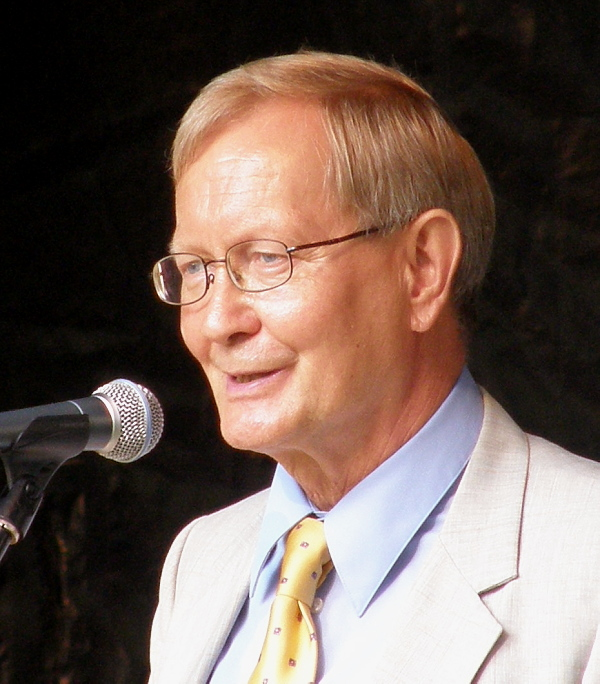

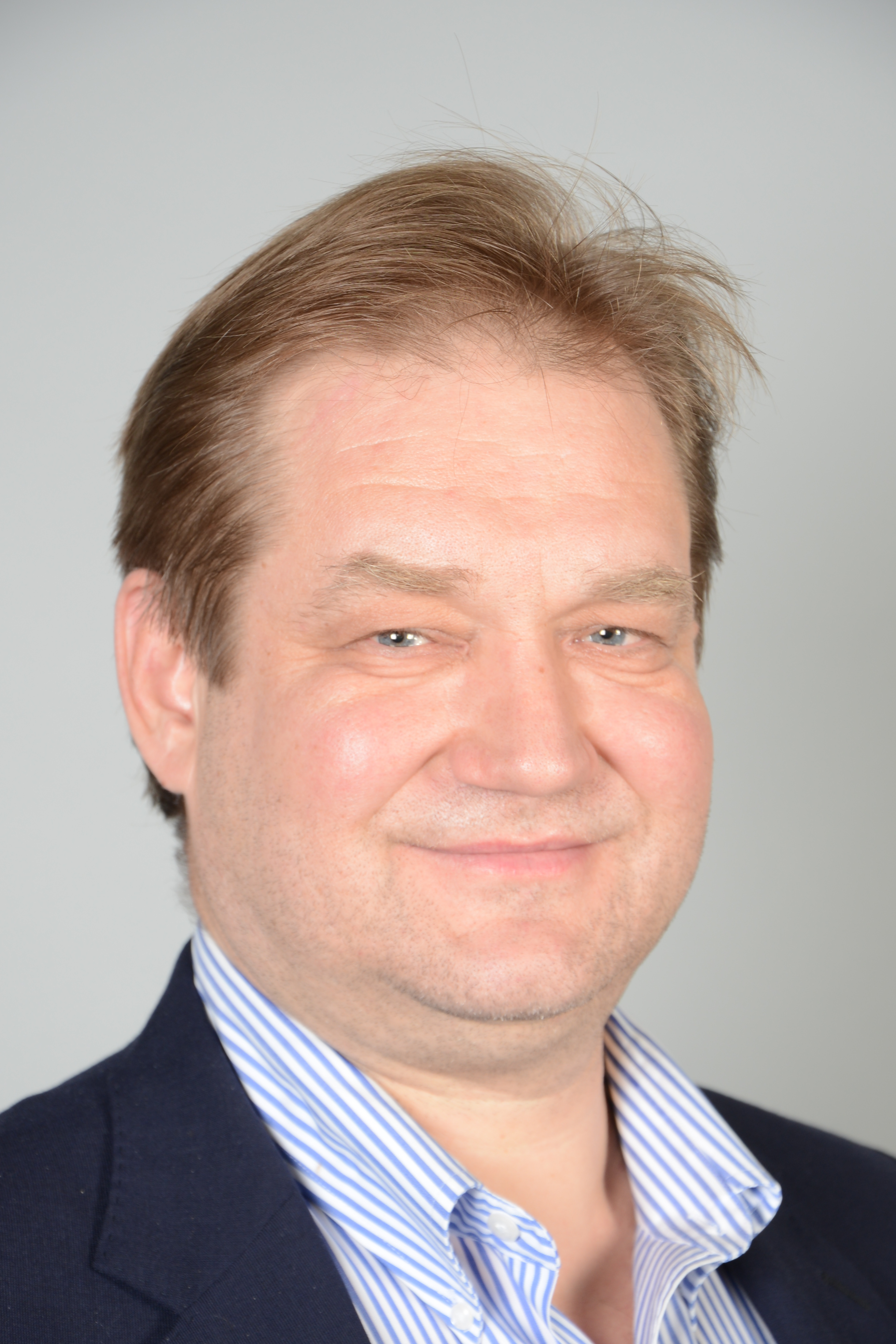
	First party	Second party	Third party
Leader	Edgar Savisaar	Juhan Parts	Siim Kallas
Party	Centre	Res Publica	Reform
Last election	28 seats	–	18 seats
Seats won	28	28	19
Seat change	Steady	New	▲1
Popular vote	125,709	121,856	87,551
Percentage	25.40%	24.62%	17.69%
Swing	▲2.00pp	New	▲1.79pp
	Fourth party	Fifth party	Sixth party
Leader	Villu Reiljan	Tunne Kelam	Ivari Padar
Party	People's Union	Pro Patria Union	SDE
Last election	7	18	17
Seats won	13	7	6
Seat change	▲6	▼11	▼11
Popular vote	64,463	36,169	34,837
Percentage	13.03%	7.31%	7.04%
Swing	▲5.82pp	▼8.79pp	▼8.11pp
- Results by electoral district
Prime Minister before election
Siim Kallas
Reform
Prime Minister after election
Juhan Parts
Res Publica

Parliamentary elections were held in Estonia on 2 March 2003. The newly elected 101 members of the 10th Riigikogu assembled at Toompea Castle in Tallinn within ten days of the election. Two opposing parties won the most seats, with both the Centre Party and Res Publica Party winning 28 seats in the Riigikogu. Res Publica was able to gain enough support in negotiations after the elections to form a coalition government.

== Background ==
Following the 1999 election, a Triple Alliance coalition government was formed by Mart Laar of the Pro Patria Union, including the Reform Party and the Moderates.

By late 2001, scandals related to the privatization of state-owned enterprises had made the government unpopular, and relations between the Pro Patria Union and the Reform Party deteriorated. In December 2001, the Reform Party entered a coalition with the Centre Party in Tallinn, as a result of which Edgar Savisaar became the mayor. This happened after Reform had left the same Triple Alliance governing coalition in Tallinn. Prime Minister Mart Laar decided to resign, as he felt that the national level Triple Alliance government had essentially collapsed

Following that, a new coalition government was formed between the Reform Party and the Centre Party, with Siim Kallas from the Reform Party of Estonia as Prime Minister.

On 26 November 2002 the President of Estonia, Arnold Rüütel, set 2 March 2003 as the election date. 947 candidates from 11 political parties contested the election as well as 16 independents.

== Electoral system ==
The 101 members of the Riigikogu (Parliament of Estonia) were elected using a form of proportional representation for a four-year term. The seats were allocated using a modified D'Hondt method. The country is divided into twelve multi-mandate electoral districts. There is a nationwide threshold of 5% for party lists, but if the number of votes cast for a candidate exceeds or equals the simple quota (which shall be obtained by dividing the number of valid votes cast in the electoral district by the number of mandates in the district) the candidate is elected.

District number	Electoral District	Seats
1	Haabersti, Põhja-Tallinn and Kristiine districts in Tallinn	8
2	Kesklinn, Lasnamäe and Pirita districts in Tallinn	10
3	Mustamäe and Nõmme districts in Tallinn	8
4	Harjumaa (without Tallinn) and Raplamaa counties	12
5	Hiiumaa, Läänemaa and Saaremaa counties	7
6	Lääne-Virumaa county	6
7	Ida-Virumaa county	8
8	Järvamaa and Viljandimaa counties	9
9	Jõgevamaa and Tartumaa counties (without Tartu)	8
10	Tartu city	8
11	Võrumaa, Valgamaa and Põlvamaa counties	9
12	Pärnumaa county	8

== Contesting parties ==
The Estonian National Electoral Committee announced that 11 political parties and 16 individual candidates registered to take part in the 2003 parliamentary election. Their registration numbers and order were determined by the order of registration.

#	Name	Ideology	Political position	Leader	Total candidates	1999 result	
#	Name	Ideology	Political position	Leader	Total candidates	Votes (%)	Seats
1	Centre Party	Populism	Centre-left	Edgar Savisaar	125	23.4%	28 / 101
2	Moderate People's Party	Social democracy/Conservatism	Centre	Ivari Padar	125	15.2%	17 / 101
3	People's Union	Agrarianism	Centre to centre-left	Villu Reiljan	125	7.3%	7 / 101
4	Pro Patria Union	National conservatism	Right-wing	Tunne Kelam	125	16.1%	18 / 101
5	Social Democratic Labour Party	Democratic socialism	Left-wing	Tiit Toomsalu	12	6.1% (Note: On the list of Estonian United People's Party, where it won one seat)	1 / 101
6	United People's Party	Russia's national interests	Centre-left	Andrei Zarenkov	106	6.1%	5 / 101
7	Reform Party	Classical liberalism	Centre-right	Siim Kallas	125	15.9%	18 / 101
8	Res Publica Party	Liberal conservatism	Centre-right	Juhan Parts	125	did not exist	
9	Christian People's Party	Christian democracy	Centre-right	Aldo Vinkel	30	2.4%	0 / 101
10	Independence Party	Estonian nationalism	Far-right	Vello Leito	37	did not participate	
11	Russian Party	Russian minority interests	Syncretic	Stanislav Tšerepanov	12	0.2%	0 / 101
—	Individual candidates	—			16	did not exist	

== Campaign ==
Opinion polls showed the Centre Party led by the mayor of Tallinn, Edgar Savisaar, with a small lead in the run up to the election. They were expected to gain support from among those who had not benefited from the rapid economic reforms that had taken place over the last decade. However their populism and their lack of a clear policy on whether Estonia should join the European Union meant they were likely to struggle to form a coalition after the election.

The leading critics of the Centre Party were from the new conservative Res Publica Party, which had only been formed in 2002. Res Publica's campaign focused on the need to address crime and corruption and they portrayed themselves as being a change to the older political parties. Res Publica had performed strongly in the 2002 local elections after being formed from the youth wings of some of the other right wing political parties.

A leading issue in the election was the tax system with the Centre Party pledging to scrap the flat tax and change it to a progressive tax system. Both Res Publica and the Reform Party opposed this, with the Reform Party calling for the tax rate to be cut significantly. The personalities of the various party leaders were also a significant part of the campaign, with opponents particularly attacked the Centre Party leader Edgar Savisaar. Savisaar had quit as interior minister in 1995 after being accused of taping rival politicians and during the campaign the media raised questions over the financing of his campaign.

== Opinion polls ==
Poll results are listed in the table below in reverse chronological order, showing the most recent first. The highest percentage figure in each poll is displayed in bold, and the background shaded in the leading party's color. In the instance that there is a tie, then no figure is shaded.

Date	Polling firm	Kesk	IL	Ref	REM	KoE	ERL	EÜRP	ESDTP	EKRP	VEE	ERP	EIP	Others	No preference	Lead
**2 Mar 2003**	**Election results**	25.4	**7.3**	**17.7**	**7.0**	**—N/a**	**13.0**	**2.2**	**0.4**	**1.1**	**0.2**	**24.6**	**0.5**	**0.4**	**—N/a**	0.8
Feb 2003	ES Turu-uuringute	30	4	13	5	—N/a	6	—N/a	—N/a	—N/a	—N/a	24	—N/a	18		6
Sep 2002	ES Turu-uuringute	20	6	15	3	—N/a	6	—N/a	—N/a	—N/a	—N/a	7	—N/a	6	38	5
Jul 2002	ES Turu-uuringute	20	7	9	6	—N/a	6	2	1	1	1	5	—N/a	7	35	11
Jun 2002	ES Turu-uuringute	20	8	13	8	—N/a	8	—N/a	—N/a	—N/a	—N/a	8	—N/a	7	28	7
14-25 Mar 2002	ES Turu-uuringute	22	8	15	7	—N/a	7	—N/a	—N/a	—N/a	—N/a	7	—N/a	14	20	7
Feb 2002	ES Turu-uuringute	19	6	12	7	—N/a	8	—N/a	—N/a	—N/a	—N/a	6	—N/a	9	33	7
28 Jan 2002			**Siim Kallas' cabinet is formed by Ref and Kesk**													
Dec 2001	ES Turu-uuringute	22	6	11	9	—N/a	8	—N/a	—N/a	—N/a	—N/a	8	—N/a	8	28	11
8 Dec 2001			**The Res Publica Party (ERP) is formed**													
Nov 2001	Emor	21	7	13	9	—N/a	11	—N/a	—N/a	—N/a	—N/a	—N/a	—N/a	31		8
17 Nov 2001			**The Estonian Coalition Party (KoE) approves decision to disband the party**													
2-11 Nov 2001	ES Turu-uuringute	22	9	10	8	—N/a	7	—N/a	—N/a	—N/a	—N/a	—N/a	—N/a	15	30	12
Oct 2001	Emor	15	10	14	7	—N/a	13	—N/a	—N/a	—N/a	—N/a	—N/a	—N/a	31		1
Oct 2001	ES Turu-uuringute	18	6	11	9	—N/a	10	—N/a	—N/a	—N/a	—N/a	—N/a	—N/a	46		7
3-12 Sep 2001	ES Turu-uuringute	20	10	12	8	2	6	2	1	1	1	—N/a	0	6	31	8
9-16 Jul 2001	ES Turu-uuringute	20	9	11	8	1	4	2	0	1	1	—N/a	0	16	36	9
Jun 2001	ES Turu-uuringute	20	13	13	9	—N/a	6	—N/a	—N/a	—N/a	—N/a	—N/a	—N/a	39		7
9-15 May 2001	ES Turu-uuringute	17	8	13	14	1	3	1	2	1	1	—N/a	1	3	35	3
6-14 Apr 2001	ES Turu-uuringute	17	8	10	13	1	4	2	1	1	1	—N/a	0	4	38	4
7-14 Mar 2001	ES Turu-uuringute	23	9	12	16	—N/a	3	—N/a	—N/a	—N/a	—N/a	—N/a	—N/a	37		7
Feb 2001	ES Turu-uuringute	22	12	9	13	2	4	—N/a	—N/a	—N/a	—N/a	—N/a	—N/a	38		9
Feb 2001	Emor	12	8	11	5	—N/a	3	—N/a	—N/a	—N/a	—N/a	—N/a	—N/a	61		1
7 Feb 2001			**Kesknädal, the Centre Party's (Kesk) party newspaper, publishes an accusation of PM Mart Laar (IL) having shot at a picture of opposition leader Edgar Savisaar (Kesk), later known as the picture scandal**													
Nov 2001	Emor	18	11	10	9	—N/a	—N/a	—N/a	—N/a	—N/a	—N/a	—N/a	—N/a	18	34	7
16-23 Oct 2000	ES Turu-uuringute	26	15	11	15	2	4	2	1	1	1	—N/a	1	9	12	11
8-18 Sep 2000	ES Turu-uuringute	24	11	13	15	3	7	3	1	1	1	—N/a	1	15	9	9
21-28 Jan 2000	ES Turu-uuringute	22	19	12	14	3	8	3	0	2	1	—N/a	0	7	9	3
25 Mar 1999			**Mart Laar's second cabinet is formed by IL, Ref and REM**													
**7 Mar 1999**	**1999 election**	23.4	**16.1**	**15.9**	**15.2**	**7.6**	**7.3**	**6.1**		**2.4**	**2.0**	**—N/a**	**—N/a**	**3.9**	**—N/a**	7.3
**7 Mar 1999**	**1999 election**	28	**18**	**18**	**17**	**7**	**7**	**6**	**0**	**0**	**0**	**—N/a**	**—N/a**	**0**	**—N/a**	10

== Results ==
The results saw the Centre Party win the most votes but they were only 0.8% ahead of the new Res Publica party. As a result, both parties won 28 seats, which was a disappointment for the Centre Party who had expected to win the most seats. Altogether the right of centre parties won 60 seats, compared to only 41 for the left wing, and so were expected to form the next government. Voter turnout was higher than expected at 58%. The Russian minority parties lost representation in parliament, with most of such voter switching to Estonian parties of the left (Estonian Centre Party) or some to the non-nationalist right (Reform Party).

Party	Votes	%	Seats	+/–
Estonian Centre Party (Note: The Estonian Centre Party list included members of the Estonian Pensioners' Party.)	125,709	25.40	28	0
Res Publica Party	121,856	24.62	28	New
Estonian Reform Party	87,551	17.69	19	+1
People's Union of Estonia (Note: The People's Union of Estonia list included members of the New Estonia Party.)	64,463	13.03	13	+6
Pro Patria Union	36,169	7.31	7	–11
Moderate People's Party	34,837	7.04	6	–11
Estonian United People's Party	11,113	2.25	0	–6
Estonian Christian People's Party	5,275	1.07	0	0
Estonian Independence Party	2,705	0.55	0	New
Social Democratic Labour Party	2,059	0.42	0	New
Russian Party in Estonia (Note: The Russian Party in Estonia list included members of the Party of Estonian Unity, Russian Baltic Party in Estonia and the Russian Unity Party.)	990	0.20	0	0
Independents	2,161	0.44	0	0
Total	494,888	100.00	101	0
Valid votes	494,888	98.84		
Invalid/blank votes	5,798	1.16		
Total votes	500,686	100.00		
Registered voters/turnout	859,714	58.24		
Source: Nohlen & Stöver

== Aftermath ==
Both the Centre and Res Publica parties said that they should get the chance to try and form the next government, while ruling out any deal between themselves. President Rüütel had to decide who he should nominate as Prime Minister and therefore be given the first chance at forming a government. On the 2 April he invited the leader of the Res Publica party, Juhan Parts to form a government and after negotiations a coalition government composed of Res Publica, the Reform Party and the People's Union of Estonia was formed on the 10 April. The government has also been referred to as the Harmony coalition.
