= Baar (TV series) =

Estonian version of the reality television series The Bar

- Genre: Reality competition
- Country of origin: Estonia
- Original language: Estonian
- No. of seasons: 2

Original release
- Network: Kanal 2
- Release: 16 October 2004 – 31 December 2005

Baar is the Estonian version of the reality competition television series The Bar. The show aired for two seasons between 2004 and 2005 on Kanal 2.

It led to the establishment of several celebrities, including two later politicians – Paavo Pärn and Talis Kitsing from Estonian Reform Party. Another politician, Sirje Kingsepp from Estonian Left Party participated in the show.

== Setting ==
The program was set in a pub (previously known as R.I.F.F., referred to in the show as "Baar"), and in an apartment in the town centre of Tallinn. The participants' task was to run the pub and live together in the apartment.

== Season 1 ==
- Start Date: 16 October 2004
- End Date: 31 December 2004
- Duration: 77 days
- Contestants:
  - The Finalists: Annika (The Winner) & Paavo (Runner-up)
  - Evicted Contestants: Ingrid, Kaisa, Kimon, Kristjan, Lagle, Liis, Liisi, Maarit, Madis, Sirje, Talis & Tarmo

=== Contestants ===
Contestant	Residence	Occupation	Age
Annika Kiidron	Tartu	Student	22
Ingrid			23
Kaisa	Tartu	Music Student	18
Kimon Tui	Tallinn	Computer Engineer	20
Kristjan	Tallinn	Advertising Student	24
Lagle			19
Liis Härma	Tallinn		23
Liisi	Tallinn		26
Maarit Kõrgekivi	Pärnu	Student	23
Madis Räästas	Tallinn	Baker	23
Paavo Pärn	Tartu	Physics Student	25
Sirje Kingsepp	Kiviõli		35
Talis Kitsing	Tallinn	Boxing Coach	28
Tarmo Nakkurt	Metsaääre	Project Manager	35

=== Nominations ===
	Round 1	Round 2	Round 3	Round 4	Round 5	Round 6	Round 7	Round 8	Round 9	Round 10	Round 11	Round 12	Final	
Annika	-	-	-	-	-	-	-	-	-	-	-	Nominated	Winner (Day 77)	
Paavo	-	-	-	-	-	-	-	-	-	-	-	Nominated	Runner-Up (Day 77)	
Liis	-	-	-	-	-	-	-	-	-	-	-	Nominated	Evicted (Day 76)	
Kristjan	-	-	-	-	-	-	-	-	-	-	-	Evicted (Day ??)		
Ingrid	-	-	-	-	-	-	-	-	-	-	Evicted (Day ??)			
Tarmo	-	-	-	-	-	-	-	-	-	Evicted (Day ??)				
Lagle	-	-	-	-	-	-	-	-	Evicted (Day ??)					
Talis	-	-	-	-	-	-	-	Evicted (Day ??)						
Madis	-	-	-	-	-	-	Evicted (Day ??)							
Maarit	-	-	-	-	-	Evicted (Day ??)								
??	-	-	-	-	Evicted (Day ??)									
??	-	-	-	Evicted (Day ??)										
Kimon	-	-	Evicted (Day 12)											
Sirje	-	Evicted (Day ??)												
Plus (+)	-	-	-	-	?? (2 votes)	Kristjan (4 votes)	Annika (6 votes)	Paavo (2 votes)	Liis (3 votes)	Paavo (2 votes)	Liis (1 vote)	Paavo (5 votes)	None	
Minus (-) (1st Nominated)	-	-	-	-	Maarit (5 votes)	Madis (5 votes)	Talis (6 votes)	Lagle (4 votes)	Paavo (4 votes)	Kristjan (4 votes)	Kristjan (2 votes); Paavo (2 votes)	Liis (4 votes); Annika (2 votes)	None	
2nd Nominated (By Plus (+))	-	-	-	-	Madis	Talis	Tarmo	??	Tarmo	Ingrid	None	None	None	
Evicted	Sirje ??% to save	Kimon ??% to save	- ??% to save	- ??% to save	Maarit ??% to save	Madis ??% to save	Talis ??% to save	Lagle ??% to save	Tarmo ??% to save	Ingrid ??% to save	Kristjan ??% to save	Liis ??% to save		
Evicted	Sirje ??% to save	Kimon ??% to save	- ??% to save	- ??% to save	Maarit ??% to save	Madis ??% to save	Talis ??% to save	Lagle ??% to save	Tarmo ??% to save	Ingrid ??% to save	Kristjan ??% to save	Liis ??% to save	Paavo; 32% to win	Annika; 68% to win

== Season 2 ==
- Start Date: 3 October 2005
- End Date: 31 December 2005
- Duration: 90 days
- Contestants:
  - The Finalists: Alari (The Winner) & Karin (Runner-up)
  - Evicted Contestants: Anton, Kertu, Maarius, Raune, Siret, Talis, Tauri, Telle, Tiina, Toñis & Vova

=== Contestants ===
Contestant	Residence	Occupation	Age
Alari Arnover	Tallinn	Cargo Manager	23
Anton Klink	Tartu		29
Karin Kiplok	Mustamäe	Student	18
Kertu Toomsoo	Tartu	Waitress	20
Maarius Urvet	Tallinn	Music Salesman	21
Raune Linnamäe	Haapsalu	Barmaid	27
Siret Vinkel	Väike-Maarja		22
Talis Kitsing	Pärnamäe		29
Tauri Lehola	Tartu		22
Telle Vildersen	Vajangu		22
Tiina Laasma	Häädemeeste	Online Model	37
Tõnis Kulbok	Haapsalu	Dance Coach	24
Vova Rõtovanov	Tallinn		22

=== Nominations ===
	Round 1	Round 2	Round 3	Round 4	Round 5	Round 6	Round 7	Round 8	Round 9	Round 10	Round 11	Round 12	Final	
Alari	Tiina; Siret	Raune (x2); Kertu (x2)	Karin; Tauri	Karin; Tauri	Vova; Raune	Telle; Karin	Karin (x2); Raune (x2)	Karin	Siret (x2); Tõnis (x2)	Tõnis (x2); Karin (x2)	Karin; Siret	Nominated	Winner (Day 90)	
Karin	Vova; Siret	Tõnis; Kertu	Alari; Telle	Alari; Telle	Vova; Raune	Telle; Alari; Alari	Tõnis; Vova	Alari	Tõnis; Talis	Siret; Tõnis	Alari (x2); Tõnis (x2)	Nominated	Runner-Up (Day 90)	
Tõnis	Alari; Kertu	Karin; Anton	Maarius; Vova	Maarius; Vova	Raune; Telle	Telle; Alari; Alari	Karin; Vova	Alari	Karin; Talis	Alari; Siret	Alari; Karin	Nominated	Evicted (Day ??)	
Siret	Tõnis; Telle	Evicted (Day ??)							Talis; Karin	Vova; Karin	Karin; Tõnis	Evicted (Day ??)		
Vova	Tiina; Alari	Telle; Tiina	Karin; Anton	Karin (x2); Anton (x2)	Alari; Telle	Telle; Karin; Alari	Alari; Raune	Telle (x2)	Tõnis; Talis	Siret; Alari	Evicted (Day ??)			
Talis	Not in The Bar						Telle; Tõnis	Alari	Vova; Karin	Evicted (Day ??)				
Telle	Raune; Siret	Vova; Maarius	Kertu; Anton	Kertu; Anton	Raune; Tõnis	Raune; Kertu; Kertu	Karin; Vova	Vova	Evicted (Day ??)					
Raune	Maarius; Karin	Maarius; Tiina	Kertu; Maarius	Kertu; Maarius	Vova; Maarius	Telle (x2); Kertu (x2); Kertu	Karin; Vova	Evicted (Day ??)						
Kertu	Maarius; Alari	Tõnis; Tiina	Maarius (x2); Toñis (x2)	Maarius (x2); Tõnis (x2)	Raune; Maarius	Karin; Alari	Evicted (Day ??)							
Maarius	Kertu; Alari	Alari; Anton	Tauri; Anton	Tauri; Anton	Tõnis (x2); Raune (x2)	Evicted (Day ??)								
Tauri	Tiina; Anton	Maarius; Tiina	Maarius; Anton	Maarius; Anton	Evicted (Day ??)									
Anton	Raune; Tiina	Raune (x2); Kertu (x2)	Maarius; Tauri	Evicted (Day ??)										
Tiina	Telle; Kertu	Maarius; Raune	Evicted (Day ??)											
Plus (+)	Tiina (3 votes)	Maarius (3 votes)	Maarius (5 votes)	Kertu (5 votes)	Vova (3 votes)	Telle (6 votes)	Karin (5 votes)	Siret (Automatic)	Tõnis (2 votes)	Siret (2 votes)	Alari (3 votes)	Karin; Tõnis (4 votes)	None	
Minus (-) (1st Nominatedv)	Siret (3 votes)	Tiina (4 votes)	Anton (4 votes)	Tauri (6 votes)	Raune (4 votes)	Alari (3 votes)	Vova (4 votes)	Alari (3 votes)	Talis (3 votes)	Karin (3 votes)	Tõnis (3 votes)	Alari (2 votes)	None	
2nd Nominated (By Plus (+))	Alari	Kertu	Vova	Maarius	Maarius	Kertu	Raune	Telle	Alari	Vova	Siret	Tõnis (By Alari)	None	
Evicted	Siret; 61% to evict	Tiina; 82% to evict	Anton; 79% to evict	Tauri; 61% to evict	Maarius; 61% to evict	Kertu; 82% to evict	Raune; 70% to evict	Telle; 76% to evict	Talis; 78% to evict	Vova; 52% to evict	Siret; 56% to evict	Tõnis; 78% to evict		
Evicted	Siret; 61% to evict	Tiina; 82% to evict	Anton; 79% to evict	Tauri; 61% to evict	Maarius; 61% to evict	Kertu; 82% to evict	Raune; 70% to evict	Telle; 76% to evict	Talis; 78% to evict	Vova; 52% to evict	Siret; 56% to evict	Tõnis; 78% to evict	Karin; 32% to won	Alari; 68% to won
