= Kingsepp =

Family name

Kingsepp is an Estonian language occupational surname, literally meaning "shoemaker". Notable people with the surname include:

- Sirje Kingsepp (born 1969), Estonian politician
- Viktor Kingissepp (1888–1922), Estonian Communist politician
