= Talis Kitsing =

Estonian kickboxing coach and politician

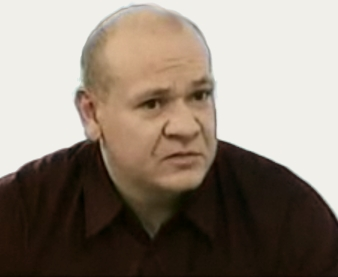
- Born: 28 March 1976
- Died: 23 July 2009 (aged 33)
- Resting place: Pärnamäe
- Occupations: kickboxing trainer, politician
- Known for: Baar
- Political party: Estonian Independence Party

Talis Kitsing (28 March 1976 – 23 July 2009) was an Estonian kickboxing trainer and a member of the Estonian Reform Party and later Estonian Independence Party. He was best known for his participation in the reality TV show Baar (The Bar).

Kitsing joined Reform Party in 2005, but left it to join Independence Party in June 2009. He had said that he thought all parties in power are corrupt, and that he valued nationalism.

He left Reform Party after posting links to The Protocols of the Elders of Zion on his blog, to which the party did not react well. Kitsing said it was meant as provocation.

Kitsing died on 23 or 24 July 2009, in his home. He was 33 years old, and reportedly in good health, but he was asthmatic. The cause of death is unknown or not revealed to the public. His death was confirmed by police to be non-violent.

After his death, Independence Party published a press release stating that they can "definitely" say that Kitsing's death was "NOT suicide" and that it "could have been a political murder".
