= Puustusmaa =

Family surname

Puustusmaa is an Estonian surname. Notable people with the surname Puustusmaa include:

- Andres Puustusmaa (born 1971), Estonian film director
- Paul Puustusmaa (born 1964), Estonian lawyer and politician
