= Andrei Zarenkov =

Estonian politician

Andrei Zarenkov (born 31 August 1959 in Tallinn) is an Estonian politician.

He has been the leader of Maardu Cultural Centre (Estonian: Maardu rahvamaja) from where he was dismissed in 2014 following a court verdict for repeated bribery. He was sentenced to two years of imprisonment.

He has been the chairman of Constitution Party and a member of the central leadership of the Estonian Left Party
