= Hillar Eller =

Estonian long distance runner and politician

Leader of the Estonian Left Party
- In office 1 June 1995 – 30 September 1996
- Preceded by: Vaino Väljas
- Succeeded by: Tiit Toomsalu

Personal details
- Born: 15 December 1939 Kärdla, Estonia
- Died: 22 February 2010 (aged 70) Kärdla, Estonia
- Party: Estonian Left Party
- Education: University of Tartu; Leningrad Communist University

Hillar Eller (15 December 1939 – 22 February 2010) was an Estonian long distance runner and later politician, most notable for being a voter for the Estonian restoration of Independence. He was also the chair of the Estonian Left Party from 1995 to 1996.

Eller graduated from Kärdla Secondary School in 1958, from the law faculty at the University of Tartu in 1973, and in 1981 from Leningrad Communist University.

He worked in the Sports Federation of Power in Hiiumaa from 1958 to 1964. From 1964 to 1970, he was the secretary of the Hiuumaa branch of the Central Committee of the Leninist Young Communist League of Estonia (ELKNÜ), and from 1966 to 1972 he was a member of the Central Committee of ELKNÜ. From 1970 to 1972, he was chairman of the Hiiumaa People's Control Commission. From 1970 to 1972, he was the head of the fishery farm of Hiiu Kalur.

== Awards ==
- 2002: 5th Class of the Estonian Order of the National Coat of Arms (received 23 February 2002)
- 2006: 3rd Class of the Estonian Order of the National Coat of Arms (received 23 February 2006)
