= Kalle Palling =

Estonian politician

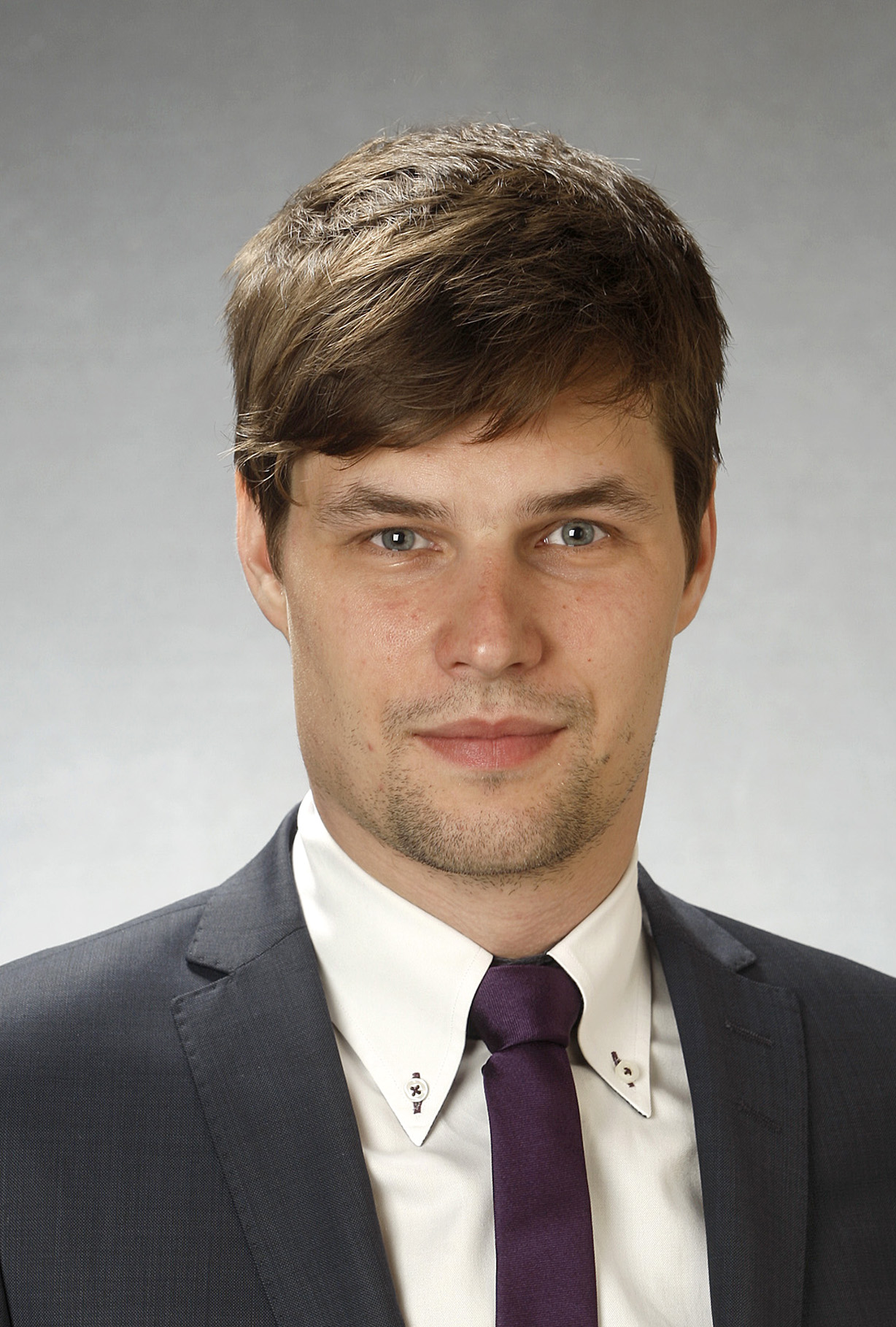

Member of the Parliament of Estonia
- Incumbent
- Assumed office 2007

Personal details
- Born: 27 February 1985 (age 41) Käru, Estonia
- Party: Reform Party

Kalle Palling (born 27 February 1985 in Käru) is an Estonian politician, representing the Reform Party. Palling was first elected to the Riigikogu in 2007 with 714 votes.

In the 2015 parliamentary election, Palling got elected for his third term with 1,917 votes. In the Riigikogu he became the Chairman of the Parliament's European Union Affairs Committee. In May 2015, was elected to the executive board of the Estonian Reform Party.
