= Rain Rosimannus =

Estonian politician and entrepreneur (born 1968)

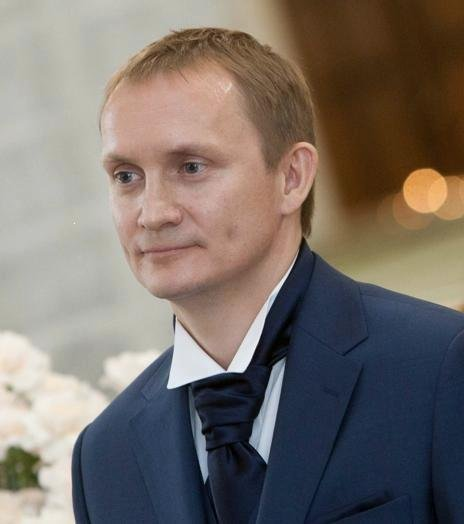
Rain Rosimannus

Rain Rosimannus (born 9 November 1968) is an Estonian entrepreneur, sociologist, politician. He has been a member of X and XI Riigikogu.

== Education ==
Rosimannus was born in Rapla. He graduated from Rapla Secondary School in 1987 (1983–1984 studied in Tallinn Sports Boarding School) and from the University of Tartu in 2001 where he studied Sociology. In 2008 he received his Master's degree.

== Career ==
Rosimannus worked as a senior laboratory assistant at Mainor Center for Public Opinion Research from 1989-1991, as a sociologist and project manager for TNS Emor from 1991-1994, as an expert of the Ida-Virumaa Government Committee in 1993, in the Office of the President of the Republic of Estonia as Adviser to the President on Internal Affairs 1994–1997, in the Chancellery of the Parliament of Estonia as an adviser to the Estonian Reform Party faction 1997-1999, in the Ministry of Finance as an adviser to the Minister 1999-2002 and as the head of Office of Prime Minister of Estonia 2002-2003, Member of the Parliament in 2003-2011 and CEO of the Academy of Liberalism in 2011-2015.

== Political activity ==
Rosimannus has been a member of the Estonian Reform Party since 1998. He was a member of the board of the Reform Party from 2003 to 2009. Chairman of the Reform Party Council 2003–2011. Honorary Golden Badges of the Reform Party in 2002, 2005, 2006 and 2010. Rosimannus was a member of the Rapla City Council since 1998. He was a member of the board of the Reform Party from 2003 to 2009. Chairman of the Reform Party Council 2003–2011 from 1999 to 2002 and Deputy Chairman of Rapla Parish Council from 2002 to 2005. He was a member of the X Riigikogu and the XI Riigikogu. Deputy Chairman of the Riigikogu faction of the Reform Party in 2005–2007 and 2009–2011. Vice-Chairman of the Estonian-Chinese, Estonian-Montenegrin and Estonian-Kuwait Friendship Groups of the Parliament 2003-11, Chairman of the Estonian-Albanian Friendship Group 2007-11. Rosimannus' activities have been directly related to the success of the Estonian Reform Party. The newspaper Äripäev named him as the person with the greatest impact on Estonian life in 2014.

== Entrepreneurship ==
Shareholder of AS EMOR (today: Kantar Emor) since 1990, in 1994 sold its 8% stake to Suomen Gallup OY. OÜ Prime Time Konverentsid partner was engaged in conference and training business in 2000–2001. Since 2004, he has owned the investment holding company OÜ Väädi. Since 2011, OÜ Väädi and its subsidiaries have been more active in business. From 2011 to 2014, it held a majority stake in Seitse, now called MyHits. Minority shareholder in European Lingerie Group AB (3.33%), Arsenal Center (4.65%) and at-visions Nordic OÜ (2%). Shareholder (30%) of Südamekodud AS and member of the supervisory board. 20% stake in Levinum OÜ, the fund manager company of WineFortune Premium Selection LP Fund. Was a member of the Supervisory Board of AS Edelaraudtee (2000) and AS Eesti Raudtee (2003–2009).

== Other community, social and personal service activities ==
President of the Rapla Boys' Club (1983–84). Founding member of the Estonian Academic Association of Sociologists (1990; since 1999 the Estonian Association of Sociologists). Founding member of the Estonian Sociology Students' Union (1991). Founding member of the Estonian-Chinese Society (2007; discontinued). Member of the Board of Trustees of the Estonian Academy of Arts 2005–2014. He has also been a member of the supervisory board of the North Estonia Medical Centre Foundation (2007–2009) and the Environmental Investment Centre (2003–2009). 2012–2016 and since February 2018 Member of the Council of Estonian Evangelical Lutheran Church Tallinn St. John's Congregation.

== Personal life ==
Rosimannus is married to Keit Pentus-Rosimannus. One daughter (born in 2021) and one son (2024). Two adult sons from a previous marriage. He has played football as a defender and midfielder at the Rapla County (Rapla SAO, Rapla KEK, FC Lelle), Tallinn Youth (OSK III) and Adult (Tallinn Specialized Car Base) and Estonian Championships (FC Tallinn, FC Toompea). He is a member of the Estonian Reform Party.

== Articles, interviews ==
1. Juhan Kivirähk, Rain Rosimannus, Indrek Pajumaa (1993). The Premises for Democracy: A Study of Political Values in Post-Independent Estonia. Journal of Baltic Studies, Vol. XXIV, 2, lk. 149–160. 2. 2004 Rain Rosimannus, Mikk Titma. "Estonia" in Public Opinion and Polling Around the World. Geer, J. G. (Editor). Public Opinion and Polling Around the World: A Historical Encyclopedia, 2, Santa Barbara: ABC-CLIO. p 570–576 3. 1995 Rain Rosimannus. "Political Parties: Identity and Identification". In A. Park, R. Ruutsoo (editors) Visions and Policies: Estonia's Path to Independence and Beyond, 1987-1993, Nationalities Papers, Vol. 23, No. 1, 1995, p 29-41
