= Vello Leito =

Estonian politician (born 1941)

Vello Leito (born 25 August 1941 in Iisaku) is an Estonian politician.

In 1966, he graduated from Tallinn University of Technology in electrical engineering.

He took place in 2014 European Parliament election in Estonia.

He has been the Chairman of Estonian Independence Party.
