= Arvo Sirendi =

Estonian politician

Arvo Sirendi (born 4 April 1939 Kuimetsa Parish, Harju County) is an Estonian agronomist and politician. He was a member of VII, VII and IX Riigikogu, representing the Estonian Coalition Party.
