= Ülo Vooglaid =

Estonian politician

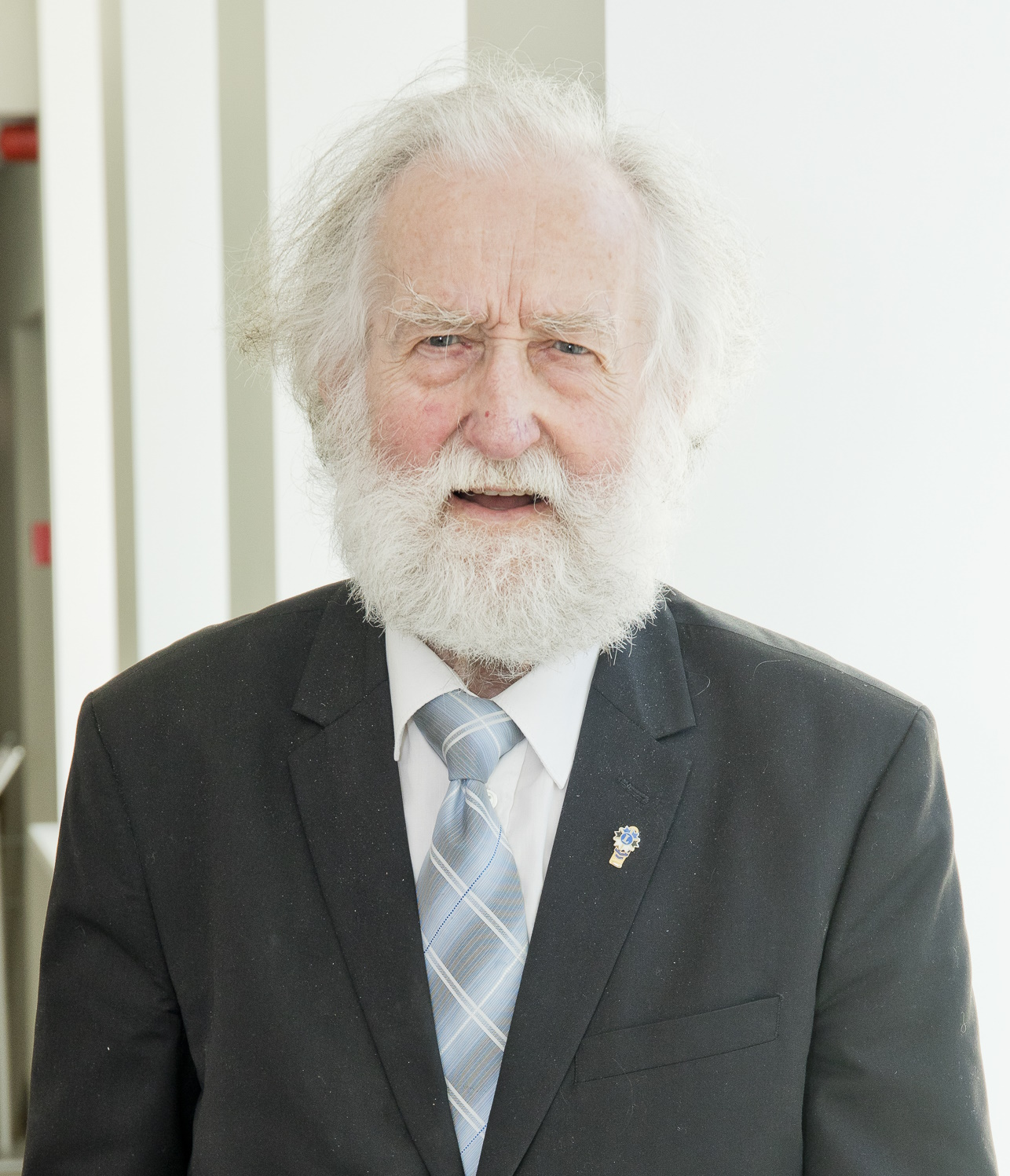
Ülo Vooglaid in 2018

Ülo Vooglaid (born 21 April 1935) is an Estonian sociologist, educator and politician. He was a member of VII, VIII and X Riigikogu.

He has been a member of Res Publica Party.
