= Reet Roos =

Estonian politician (born 1973)

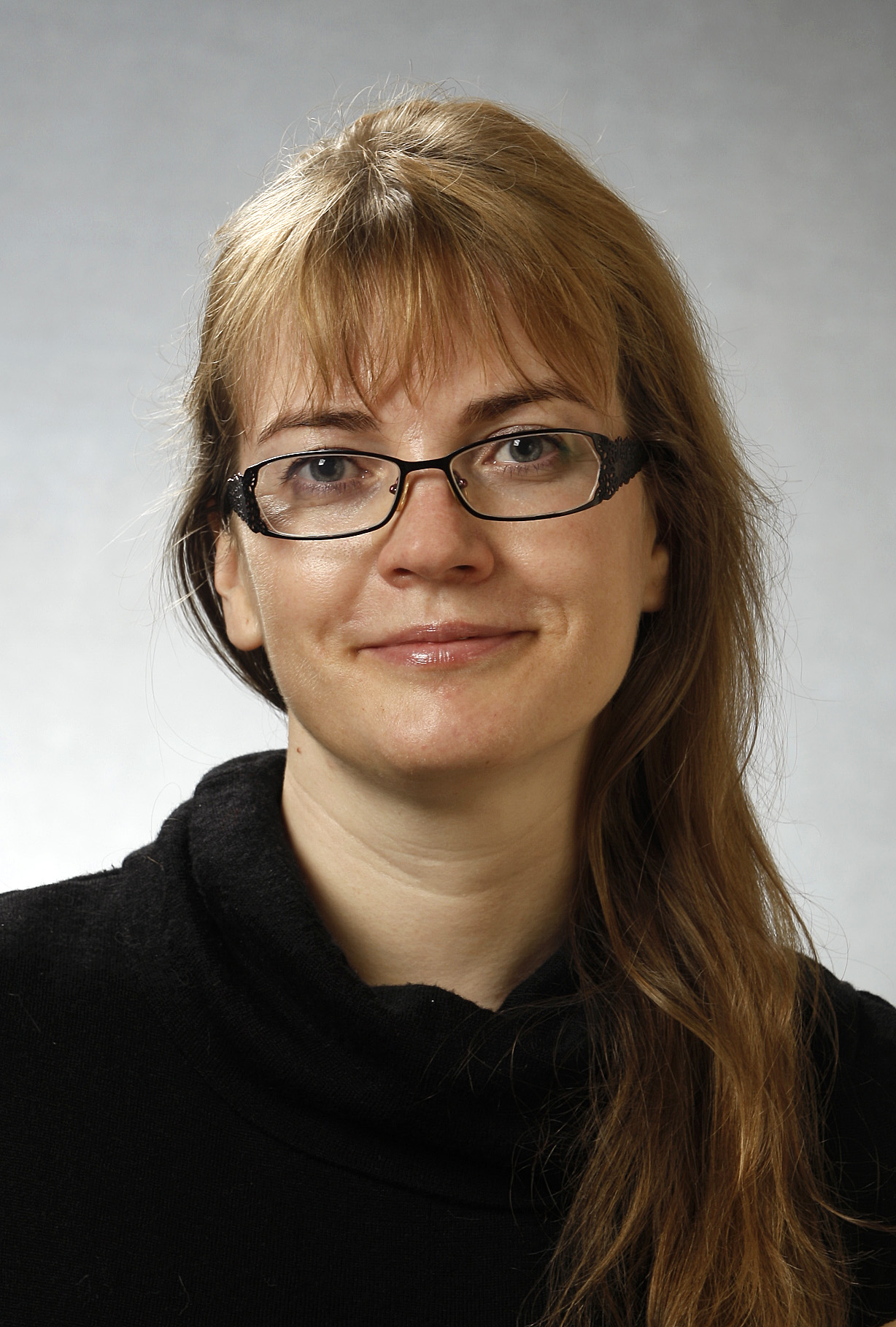
Reet Roos

Reet Roos (born 1 April 1973 in Taebla) is an Estonian politician. She has been member of X and XII Riigikogu.

She is a member of Pro Patria and Res Publica Union.
