= Olav Anton =

Estonian politician

Olav Anton (born 28 July 1954 – August 2022) was an Estonian politician. He was a member of VII and VIII Riigikogu.

Anton was born in Tartu and is a 1977 graduate of the Estonian Agricultural University, with a degree in electrical engineering.
