= Siim Pohlak =

Estonian politician, born 1985

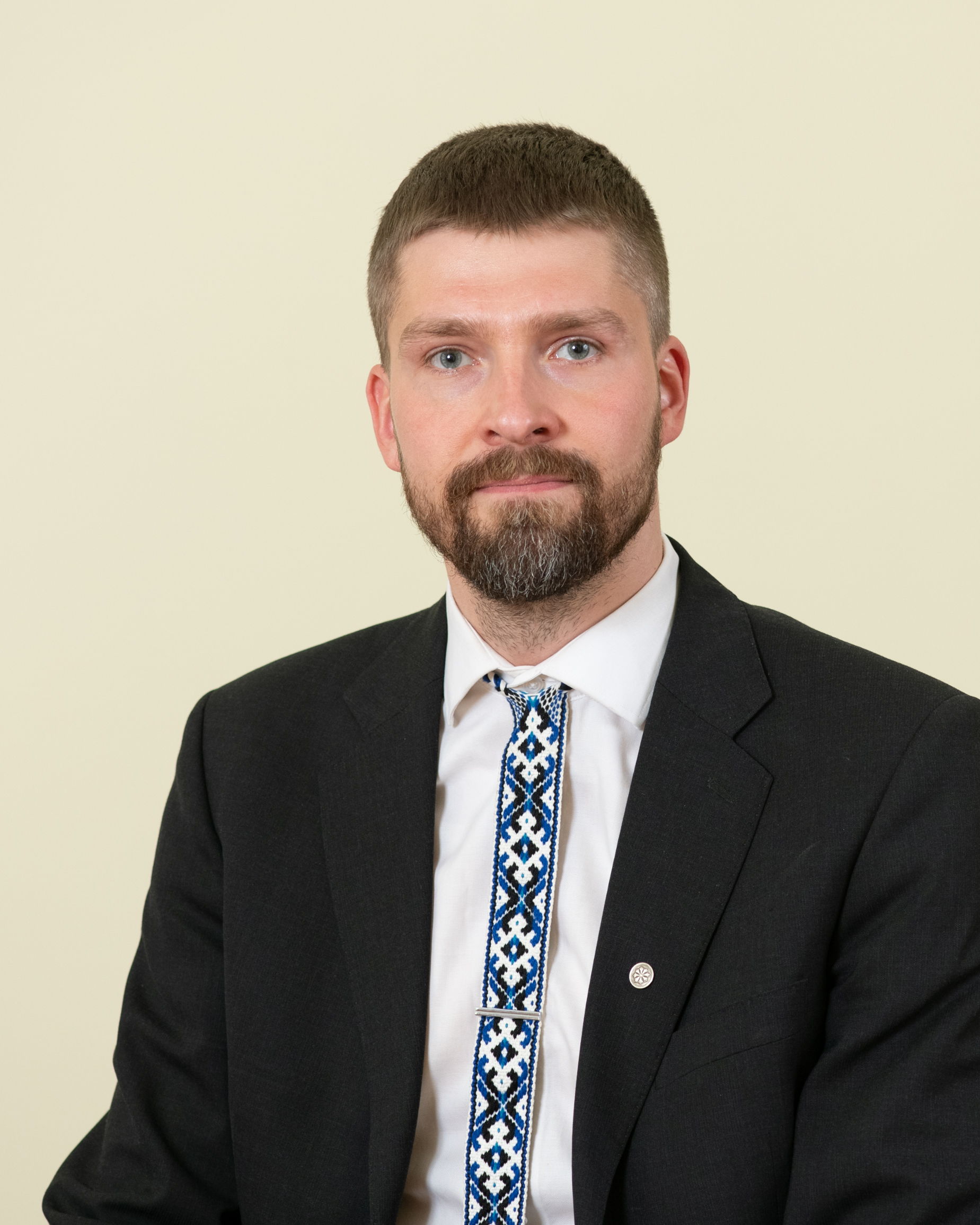

Member of XIV Riigikogu

Personal details
- Born: May 14, 1985 (age 41) Tallinn, Estonia
- Party: Conservative People's Party of Estonia
- Education: Tallinn University
- Occupation: Politician

Siim Pohlak (born 14 May 1985 in Tallinn) is an Estonian businessman and politician. He has been a member of the XIV Riigikogu.

In 2014 he graduated from Tallinn University specializing in public and business management.

Since 2014 he has been a member of the Estonian Conservative People's Party.

He ran for the Riigikogu in the 2023 elections and received 4,223 votes in electoral district number 4, which covers Harju (excluding Tallinn) and Rapla, securing his election as a member of the Riigikogu.
