= Tiit Toomsalu =

Estonian politician (born 1949)

Leader of the Estonian Left Party
- In office 30 November 1996 – 18 December 2004
- Preceded by: Hillar Eller
- Succeeded by: Sirje Kingsepp

Personal details
- Born: 21 November 1949 (age 76)
- Party: Estonian Left Party
- Education: University of Tartu

Tiit Toomsalu (born 21 November 1949) is an Estonian politician who was the leader of the Estonian Left Party from 1996 to 2004.

In 1968 he graduated from Tallinn Secondary School No. 2 (now the Tallinn Secondary School of Science). In 1974, he graduated from the University of Tartu with a degree in law.

From 1999 to 2003, he was a member of the Riigikogu as part of the Estonian United People's Party. From 1996 to 2004, he was chairman of the Estonian Left Party (now merged into the Estonian United Left Party). Toomsalu was considered one of the more prominent left-wing politicians in Estonia after independence while active in political office. During his time in the Riigikogu, where he was a member of the Constitutional law committee, he was infamous for his prolonged questions speeches and numerous proposed amendments to the constitution. In direct response to Toomsalu, the Riigikogu passed a regulation that excluded any amendments and initiatives if it was supported by only one member of the Riigikogu. He was also against joining NATO and the European Union. According to a commercial register, he had been a member of the party since 1991. In 2010, the party was liquidated by decision of the board, due to its merger with the Constitution Party to form the Estonian United Left Party.

Toomsalu is married and has two children.
