= Paul Puustusmaa =

Estonian lawyer and politician

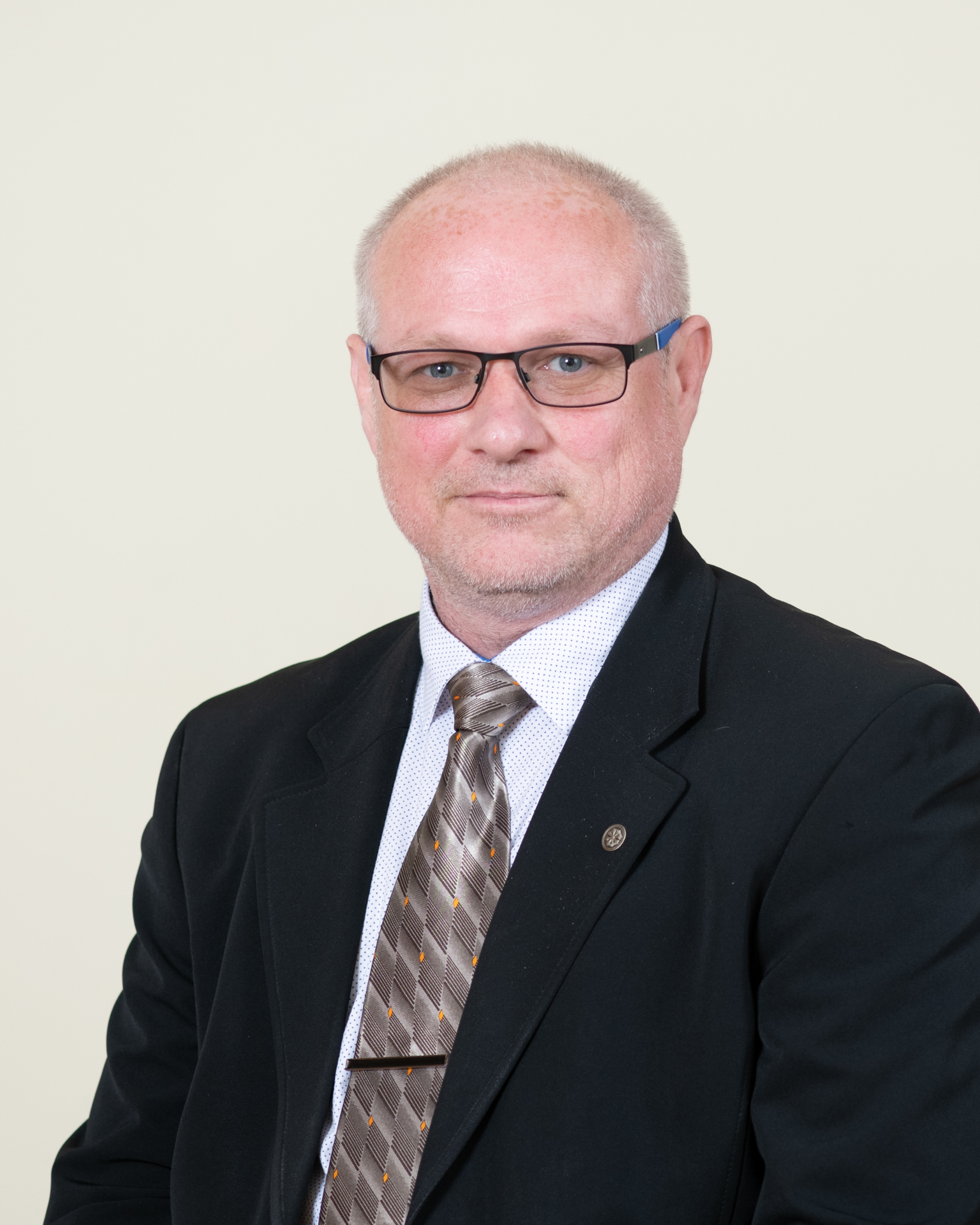
Paul Puustusmaa in 2019

Paul Puustusmaa (born 5 September 1964 in Kuressaare) is an Estonian lawyer and politician. He was a member of the XIV Riigikogu.

In 1992 he graduated from University of Tartu with a law degree.

From 1992 to 1998 he was a lawyer for the company AS Raidman. From 2005 to 2008 he worked at the company AS YIT Ehitus as head of the legal department.

Since 2012 he has been a member of the Estonian Conservative People's Party.
