= Estonian nationalism =

The Estonian Flag.

Estonian nationalism refers to the ideological movement for attaining and maintaining identity, unity, freedom and independence on behalf of the Estonian people, having one Estonian homeland – Estonia, sharing the common Estonian culture, as well as ancestral myths and memories, a common economy and common legal rights and duties for all members.

== Emergence of Estonian national identity in the 19th century ==
Estonian nationalism emerged in the first half of the 19th century, in large part a result of the activities of the Estophile movement of the late 18th to early 19th century, when local Baltic German scholars, influenced by the European Enlightenment, began documenting and promoting the culture and the language of Estonian farmers.

Early Estonian nationalism grew into a strong popular movement and a distinct Estonian national identity began to emerge in the mid-19th century as a result of the "Estonian national awakening" and the people's rapidly increasing access to Estonian-language newspapers, cultural activities and secondary education.

A prominent figure in Estonian nationalism was Carl Robert Jakobson. During the late 19th century, Jakobson made significant financial contributions to the promotion of Estonian-language printed media and education. He was one of the main sponsors of the Estonian Alexander School. Politically, however, Jakobson was often misunderstood as well as misrepresented by opponents and, whilst popular among the farmers, he could find only very limited support among other parts of the wider population of Estonia.

Another prominent figure in the history of Estonian nationalism was the poet Lydia Koidula, who voiced the ideas for an independent and sovereign Estonia already in the 19th century. Her collection of poetry Emajõe ööbik became the country's second most widely printed book after the Bible, and in the beginning of 20th century almost every household in Estonia had a copy of it. She became a unique personified symbol of the Estonians' cultural revival and national awareness.

The Estonian nationalist movement eventually, after the 1917 collapse of the Russian Empire, led to the Estonian Declaration of Independence and the foundation of the independent democratic Republic of Estonia in 1918. On February 24, 1918, the Republic of Estonia was proclaimed and secured its independence in the following Estonian War of Independence of 1918-1920. In June 1940, Estonia was invaded and occupied by the Soviet Union, introducing a totalitarian state and a terror regime. With the outbreak of war between Nazi Germany and the Soviet Union in 1941, many nationalists in Estonia thought they would have an opportunity to create an independent country once again, and collaborated with the German occupation administration and military units. However, the German treatment of the local population quickly put an end to this prospect.

The "Forest Brethren" was a loose set of Estonian nationalist guerrilla units that first took up arms against the Red Army and the Soviet occupation authorities in 1941, and followed their armed resistance after the 1944 Soviet reconquest of Estonia. The Estonian anti-Soviet guerrillas were not exclusively ethnic Estonians, but included also Ingrians, Latvians, Russians, and Jews. For several years after World War II, the Estonian nationalist guerrilla fighters directed their military actions against the Soviet occupation authorities in Estonia. Many members of these nationalist units saw themselves as the armed wing of the Estonian people in its struggle for Estonian independence.

Estonian Forest Brethren maintain a prominent and symbolic role in Estonian history and the quest for Estonian independence. They have been deemed as illegal insurgents or terrorist groups by the former Soviet and current Russian historiography.

Ideas of Estonia having a Nordic identity have been part of Estonian nationalist discourse.

=== Singing Revolution ===
From 1987, Estonian nationalism emerged in form of many spontaneous non-violent mass demonstrations that ultimately led Estonia to regain its full independence in August 1991. Similar events took place in Latvia and Lithuania.

== Estonian nationalism in the 21st century ==
Currently, parties identifying strictly as nationalist are the Conservative People's Party of Estonia (EKRE) and the Estonian Independence Party.

One of the most significant expressions of Estonian nationalism is still the Estonian Song Festival, one of the largest amateur choral events in the world that is held every five years in July.

After the 2019 Estonian parliamentary election the ethnic-nationalist party EKRE entered into a coalition government for the first time.

== See also ==
- Estonian national awakening
- Latvian national awakening
- Lithuanian national awakening
- Finnish nationalism
- Singing Revolution
- Romantic nationalism
- Russian nationalism
- German nationalism
