= Estonian Left Party =

Estonian political party

Estonian Left Party Eesti Vasakpartei
- Founded: 19 December 1990
- Dissolved: 28 June 2008
- Preceded by: Communist Party of Estonia
- Succeeded by: Estonian United Left Party
- Headquarters: Tallinn 10510; Peapostkontor; P. Box 4102
- Ideology: Democratic socialism
- Political position: Left-wing
- European affiliation: Party of the European Left; New European Left Forum (Historical)
- Colours: red, green
- Riigikogu (2007): 0 / 101
- European Parliament (2004): 0 / 6

Website
- www.esdtp.ee

Estonian Left Party (Estonian: Eesti Vasakpartei, EVP) was a leftist socialist political party in Estonia.

== History ==
- 1990: Registration of the independent Estonian Communist Party (EKP).
- 1992: Congress of EKP renamed Estonian Democratic Labour Party (Eesti Demokraatlik Tööerakond, EDTP).
- July 1995: EDLP joined New European Left Forum.
- 1997: Party renamed the Estonian Social Democratic Labour Party (ESDTP).
- 2004: ESDTP becomes founding member of European Left party.
- December 2004: Estonian Social Democratic Labour Party changes name to Estonian Left Party (EVP).

According to the statutes of party, the party congress elects the Party Chairman and Executive board as well as nominates a consultative Central Council representing all regional organizations. Local policies are developed by local organizations, while central bodies formulate national policies.

EVP lost representatives in parliament on the 2003 elections when they got 2,059 votes (0.4%). In 2007 election, it fell further to 0.1% and again got no seats.

The party has been chaired by:

- Vaino Väljas (1992–1995)
- Hillar Eller (1995–1996)
- Tiit Toomsalu (1996–2004)
- Sirje Kingsepp (2004–2007)

On 28 June 2008, the Estonian Left Party and the Constitution Party merged to form the Estonian United Left Party (Eestimaa Ühendatud Vasakpartei).

In a privacy rights legal dispute between Sirje Kingsepp and Eesti Päevaleht, the party was deemed "completely marginal" in Estonia's public life.
