= Sirje Kingsepp =

Estonian politician

Leader of the Estonian Left Party
- In office 18 December 2004 – 13 June 2007
- Preceded by: Tiit Toomsalu
- Succeeded by: Party merged with Constitution Party to form Estonian United Left Party

Personal details
- Born: 13 September 1969 (age 56) Kiviõli, Estonia
- Political party: Estonian Left Party

Sirje Kingsepp (born 13 September 1969) is an Estonian politician and celebrity, who was the last leader of the Estonian Left Party.

== Biography ==
She is a former chairperson of the Estonian Left Party (Estonian: Eestimaa Vasakpartei).

Kingsepp caught attention with her legal action against Eesti Päevaleht concerning publication of Feminist and Socialist but not Communist, a political profile story by Eesti Päevaleht, after she was finished an active political activity. The story was originally published on 23 December 2004. It was available via Eesti Päevaleht's web archive until December 2008 when she requested its withdrawal on grounds of it containing her personal data, particularly marital status, number of children, and location of birth, education, and residence. Subsequently, Estonian Data Protection Inspection backed the request; Eesti Päevaleht complied but appealed to Tallinn Administrative Court. In June 2009, the court upheld the request on grounds that public interest towards Kingsepp's person has ceased since she withdrew from active politics, and that her former party is a "completely marginal" organisation. Accordingly, the story was no longer available on Eesti Päevaleht's website. It could still be read in libraries that maintain archives of newspapers. From 19 August 2010 it is again available due to the ruling of the Supreme Court of Estonia.
