= Estonian Independence Party =

Estonian political party (1999–2022)

Estonian Independence Party Eesti Iseseisvuspartei
- Founded: 30 November 1999
- Dissolved: 30 October 2022
- Merged into: Estonian Conservative People's Party
- Headquarters: Tatari tn 8-21, Tallinn
- Ideology: Estonian nationalism; Right-wing populism; Euroscepticism; Russophilia; Neo-Nazism
- Political position: Far-right
- Colours: Blue

The Estonian Independence Party (Estonian: Eesti Iseseisvuspartei, EIP) was a far-right nationalist political party in Estonia. The small party, founded in 1999, never had any significant success in the elections, and it was dissolved in 2022. One of the principal aims of the party was the withdrawal of Estonia from the European Union.

== Philosophy ==
The EIP's political philosophy promoted a doctrine of “Estonia as a neo-autarkic geopolitical space” and an associated geopolitical imperative of neutrality between the East and the West.

The party programme states that Estonia is extraordinarily rich in natural resources (much of these remain latent) and is situated in an important geopolitical space. Thus, the party is also against Estonia belonging to the European Union, which they accuse of having neocolonised Estonia. The party recommended rejecting International Monetary Fund suggestions. The party regards Setomaa as a part of Estonia and not Russia.

== History ==
The party's predecessor, Estonian Future Party (Tuleviku Eesti Erakond) was founded in 1994. In 1999, it was renamed to Estonian Independence Party.

In 2001, the party called for closer relations with Russia and said that the country should have a bigger say in defining Estonia's future.

EIP took part in the 2003 movement against Estonia joining the European Union.

EIP candidates gained 2,705 votes, amounting to 0.55% of the national vote, in the 2003 parliamentary election. In the 2007 elections, the party's vote dropped to 1,274 votes, which was 0.2% of the total. In the 2011 elections, the party's vote increased to 2,571 votes, which was 0.4% of the total.

In the 2014 European Parliamentary election, the Estonian Independence Party received 4,158 votes, which was 1.3% of the vote, the party's highest ever. Former Union of Pro Patria and Res Publica and future Estonia 200 MP Juku-Kalle Raid ran on the party's list in the election.

In the 2015 parliamentary elections, the party's vote diminished to 1,047 votes, which was 0.2% of the total. The party did not participate in the 2019 parliamentary elections.

In 2022, it was reported that EIP was considering dissolving itself and, soon afterwards, in October 2022, most politicians belonging to then party's leadership joined the Estonian Conservative People's Party instead. The party was officially removed from the business register on 30 October.

=== Controversies ===
Scholars categorised the party as a far-right organisation. This has been rejected by the party leaders, Sven Sildnik and Tauno Rahnu. One of the former leading members, Risto Teinonen, an ethnic Finn associated with Johan Bäckman, is an open neo-Nazi, he has organized parties on the anniversary of the Wannsee Conference and on Hitler's birthday where he has appeared in a Nazi uniform. He has also mailed Heinrich Himmler's writings on homosexuality to Riigikogu deputies and has published books such as "Adolf Hitler the Liberator".

== Electoral results ==
=== Parliamentary elections ===
Election	Votes			Seats		Pos.
Election	#	%	± pp	#	±	Pos.
2003	2,705	0.5		0 / 101	0	9th
2007	1,273	0.2	▼0.3	0 / 101	0	9th
2011	2,571	0.4	▲0.2	0 / 101	0	9th
2015	1,047	0.2	▼0.2	0 / 101	0	9th
2019	Did not participate					

== See also ==
- List of political parties in Estonia
