= Riigikogu electoral district no. 10 =

Electoral district of Estonia

Electoral district no. 10
- Valimisringkond nr 10
- Electoral District for the Riigikogu
- Location of Electoral district no. 10 within Estonia
- Municipality: Tartu
- County: Tartu
- Population: 96,123 (2020)
- Electorate: 67,525 (2019)

Current Electoral District
- Created: 1995
- Seats: List: 8 (1999–present); 9 (1995–1999)
- Member of the Riigikogu: List: Hele Everaus (RE); Ruuben Kaalep (EKRE); Signe Kivi (RE); Ants Laaneots (RE); Mihhail Lotman (I); Aadu Must (K); Heljo Pikhof (SDE); Jaak Valge (EKRE)
- Created from: District no. 10

Electoral district no. 10 (Estonian: Valimisringkond nr 10) is one of the 12 multi-member electoral districts of the Riigikogu, the national legislature of Estonia. The district was established as electoral district no. 9 in 1995 following the re-organisation of electoral districts. It was renamed electoral district no. 10 in 2003 following another re-organisation of electoral districts. It is conterminous with the municipality of Tartu. The district currently elects eight of the 101 members of the Riigikogu using the open party-list proportional representation electoral system. At the 2019 parliamentary election it had 67,525 registered electors.

== Electoral system ==
Electoral district no. 10 currently elects eight of the 101 members of the Riigikogu using the open party-list proportional representation electoral system. The allocation of seats is carried out in three stages. In the first stage, any individual candidate, regardless of whether they are a party or independent candidate, who receives more votes than the district's simple quota (Hare quota: valid votes in district/number of seats allocated to district) is elected via a personal mandate. In the second stage, district mandates are allocated to parties by dividing their district votes by the district's simple quota. Only parties that reach the 5% national threshold compete for district mandates and any personal mandates won by the party are subtracted from the party's district mandates. Prior to 2003 if a party's surplus/remainder votes was equal to or greater than 75% of the district's simple quota it received one additional district mandate. Any unallocated district seats are added to a national pool of compensatory seats. In the final stage, compensatory mandates are calculated based on the national vote and using a modified D'Hondt method. Only parties that reach the 5% national threshold compete for compensatory seats and any personal and district mandates won by the party are subtracted from the party's compensatory mandates. Though calculated nationally, compensatory mandates are allocated at the district level.

=== Seats ===
Seats allocated to electoral district no. 10 by the National Electoral Committee of Estonia at each election was as follows:

- 2023 - 8
- 2019 - 8
- 2015 - 8
- 2011 - 8
- 2007 - 8
- 2003 - 8
- 1999 - 8
- 1995 - 9

== Election results ==
=== Summary ===
Election	Left EÜVP/EVP/ESDTP/Õ/V			Constitution K/EÜRP/MKOE			Social Democrats SDE/RM/M			Greens EER/NJ/R			Centre K/R			Reform RE			Isamaa I/IRL/I/I\ERSP/I			Conservative People's EKRE/ERL/EME/KMÜ		
Election	Votes	%	Seats	Votes	%	Seats	Votes	%	Seats	Votes	%	Seats	Votes	%	Seats	Votes	%	Seats	Votes	%	Seats	Votes	%	Seats
2023	786	1.60%	0				4,869	9.92%	1	821	1.67%	0	3,600	7.34%	0	17,627	35.92%	3	4,219	8.60%	0	7,138	14.55%	1
2019	30	0.07%	0				5,087	11.35%	1	939	2.09%	0	6,099	13.60%	1	15,504	34.58%	3	5,416	12.08%	1	7,641	17.04%	1
2015	22	0.05%	0				7,541	16.79%	1	725	1.61%	0	6,787	15.11%	1	14,984	33.37%	2	6,478	14.43%	1	3,109	6.92%	0
2011							8,593	18.73%	1	1,674	3.65%	0	7,106	15.49%	1	15,798	34.43%	3	11,156	24.31%	2	542	1.18%	0
2007	91	0.21%	0	227	0.51%	0	5,996	13.54%	1	3,593	8.12%	0	7,171	16.20%	1	15,335	34.64%	3	9,607	21.70%	1	1,624	3.67%	0
2003	228	0.55%	0	573	1.38%	0	3,577	8.63%	0				6,431	15.51%	1	11,634	28.07%	2	4,812	11.61%	1	3,332	8.04%	0
1999				813	2.09%	0	5,914	15.22%	1				6,789	17.48%	1	10,169	26.18%	2	9,863	25.39%	2	1,109	2.85%	0
1995	1,023	2.48%	0	2,251	5.45%	0	1,942	4.70%	0	696	1.68%	0	4,043	9.78%	0	7,548	18.26%	1	6,812	16.48%	1	7,671	18.56%	1

(Excludes compensatory seats)

=== Detailed ===
Party has received at least 5% of the vote nationally and is entitled to compete for district seats.

==== 2023 ====
Results of the 2023 parliamentary election held on 5 March 2023:

Party		Votes			Total Votes	%	Seats			
Party		Tartu	Expat- riates	Elec- tronic	Total Votes	%	Per.	Dis.	Com.	Tot.
Estonian Reform Party	REF	6,312	37	11,094	17,627	35.92%	1	2	1	4
Estonia 200	EE200	3,318	18	5,645	9,043	18.43%	0	1	0	1
Conservative People's Party of Estonia	EKRE	5,167	84	1,771	7,138	14.55%	0	1	0	1
Social Democratic Party	SDE	1,974	16	2,809	4,869	9.92%	0	1	0	1
Isamaa	IE	2,191	12	1,950	4,219	8.60%	0	0	1	1
Estonian Centre Party	KESK	2,556	3	986	3,600	7.34%	0	0	0	0
Parempoolsed		386	2	573	965	1.97%	0	0	0	0
Estonian Greens	EER	341	4	464	821	1.67%	0	0	0	0
Estonian United Left Party	EÜVP	636	3	141	786	1.60%	0	0	0	0
Valid votes		22,881	179	25,433	49,068	100.00%	1	5	2	8
Rejected votes		179	3	0	195	0.40%				
Total polled		23,060	182	25,433	49,263	67.06%				
Registered electors		66,768	6,688		73,456					

The following candidates were elected:

- Personal mandates - Urmas Klaas (REF), 8,065 votes.
- District mandates - Yoko Alender (REF), 2,051 votes; Kristina Kallas (EE200), 4,288 votes; Ants Laaneots (REF), 1,869 votes; Heljo Pikhof (SDE), 1,242 votes; and Jaak Valge (EKRE), 2,340 votes.
- Compensatory mandates - Signe Kivi (REF), 1,286 votes; and Tõnis Lukas (IE), 2,218 votes.

==== 2019 ====
Results of the 2019 parliamentary election held on 3 March 2019:

Party		Votes			Total Votes	%	Seats			
Party		Tartu	Expat- riates	Elec- tronic	Total Votes	%	Per.	Dis.	Com.	Tot.
Estonian Reform Party	RE	6,647	38	8,819	15,504	34.58%	1	2	0	3
Conservative People's Party of Estonia	EKRE	5,288	77	2,276	7,641	17.04%	0	1	1	2
Estonian Centre Party	K	4,779	11	1,309	6,099	13.60%	0	1	0	1
Isamaa	I	2,824	26	2,566	5,416	12.08%	0	1	0	1
Social Democratic Party	SDE	2,271	31	2,785	5,087	11.35%	0	1	0	1
Estonia 200		1,197	7	1,473	2,677	5.97%	0	0	0	0
Estonian Greens	EER	426	8	505	939	2.09%	0	0	0	0
Estonian Free Party	EVA	399	3	435	837	1.87%	0	0	0	0
Estonian Biodiversity Party		260	1	340	601	1.34%	0	0	0	0
Estonian United Left Party	EÜVP	21	0	9	30	0.07%	0	0	0	0
Valid votes		24,112	202	20,517	44,831	100.00%	1	6	1	8
Rejected votes		220	2	0	222	0.49%				
Total polled		24,332	204	20,517	45,053	66.72%				
Registered electors		66,865	660		67,525					

The following candidates were elected:

- Personal mandates - Urmas Klaas (RE), 6,119 votes.
- District mandates - Signe Kivi (RE), 1,356 votes; Ants Laaneots (RE), 3,053 votes; Tõnis Lukas (I), 2,506 votes; Aadu Must (K), 2,370 votes; Heljo Pikhof (SDE), 1,522 votes; and Jaak Valge (EKRE), 2,740 votes.
- Compensatory mandates - Ruuben Kaalep (EKRE), 566 votes.

==== 2015 ====
Results of the 2015 parliamentary election held on 1 March 2015:

Party		Votes			Total Votes	%	Seats			
Party		Tartu	Expat- riates	Elec- tronic	Total Votes	%	Per.	Dis.	Com.	Tot.
Estonian Reform Party	RE	9,255	37	5,692	14,984	33.37%	1	1	1	3
Social Democratic Party	SDE	4,890	26	2,625	7,541	16.79%	0	1	1	2
Estonian Centre Party	K	6,225	12	550	6,787	15.11%	0	1	0	1
Pro Patria and Res Publica Union	IRL	4,115	33	2,330	6,478	14.43%	0	1	0	1
Estonian Free Party	EVA	3,015	14	1,974	5,003	11.14%	0	1	1	2
Conservative People's Party of Estonia	EKRE	2,359	19	731	3,109	6.92%	0	0	0	0
Estonian Greens	EER	431	2	292	725	1.61%	0	0	0	0
Urmo Karusoo (Independent)		88	0	23	111	0.25%	0	0	0	0
Party of People's Unity	RÜE	78	1	29	108	0.24%	0	0	0	0
Estonian Independence Party	EIP	32	1	6	39	0.09%	0	0	0	0
Estonian United Left Party	EÜVP	21	0	1	22	0.05%	0	0	0	0
Valid votes		30,509	145	14,253	44,907	100.00%	1	5	3	9
Rejected votes		272	1	0	273	0.60%				
Total polled		30,781	146	14,253	45,180	66.30%				
Registered electors		68,003	146		68,149					

The following candidates were elected:

- Personal mandates - Ants Laaneots (RE), 5,920 votes.
- District mandates - Krista Aru (EVA), 2,529 votes; Aadu Must (K), 2,139 votes; Mihkel Raud (SDE), 3,229 votes; Anne Sulling (RE), 4,197 votes; and Margus Tsahkna (IRL), 2,267 votes.
- Compensatory mandates - Jüri Adams (EVA), 720 votes; Urmas Klaas (RE), 1,501 votes; and Heljo Pikhof (SDE), 2,042 votes.

==== 2011 ====
Results of the 2011 parliamentary election held on 6 March 2011:

Party		Votes			Total Votes	%	Seats			
Party		Tartu	Expat- riates	Elec- tronic	Total Votes	%	Per.	Dis.	Com.	Tot.
Estonian Reform Party	RE	11,225	38	4,535	15,798	34.43%	1	2	0	3
Pro Patria and Res Publica Union	IRL	7,721	60	3,375	11,156	24.31%	0	2	0	2
Social Democratic Party	SDE	6,272	21	2,300	8,593	18.73%	0	1	0	1
Estonian Centre Party	K	6,368	6	732	7,106	15.49%	0	1	0	1
Estonian Greens	EER	1,178	5	491	1,674	3.65%	0	0	0	0
People's Union of Estonia	ERL	428	1	113	542	1.18%	0	0	0	0
Estonian Independence Party	EIP	269	4	68	341	0.74%	0	0	0	0
Russian Party in Estonia	VEE	210	0	32	242	0.53%	0	0	0	0
Sten-Hans Vihmar (Independent)		122	0	32	154	0.34%	0	0	0	0
Party of Estonian Christian Democrats	EKD	117	2	34	153	0.33%	0	0	0	0
Veiko Rämmel (Independent)		110	0	18	128	0.28%	0	0	0	0
Valid votes		34,020	137	11,730	45,887	100.00%	1	6	0	7
Rejected votes		332	10	0	342	0.74%				
Total polled		34,352	147	11,730	46,229	65.14%				
Registered electors		70,821	147		70,968					

The following candidates were elected:

- Personal mandates - Urmas Kruuse (RE), 6,824 votes.
- District mandates - Laine Jänes (RE), 2,211 votes; Tõnis Lukas (IRL), 4,807 votes; Rait Maruste (RE), 2,425 votes; Aadu Must (K), 1,901 votes; Heljo Pikhof (SDE), 3,270 votes; and Margus Tsahkna (IRL), 3,228 votes.

==== 2007 ====
Results of the 2007 parliamentary election held on 4 March 2007:

Party		Votes			Total Votes	%	Seats			
Party		Tartu	Expat- riates	Elec- tronic	Total Votes	%	Per.	Dis.	Com.	Tot.
Estonian Reform Party	RE	14,259	29	1,047	15,335	34.64%	1	2	0	3
Pro Patria and Res Publica Union	IRL	8,758	129	720	9,607	21.70%	0	1	1	2
Estonian Centre Party	K	7,046	9	116	7,171	16.20%	0	1	0	1
Social Democratic Party	SDE	5,558	15	423	5,996	13.54%	0	1	0	1
Estonian Greens	EER	3,295	14	284	3,593	8.12%	0	0	1	1
People's Union of Estonia	ERL	1,556	6	62	1,624	3.67%	0	0	1	1
Party of Estonian Christian Democrats	EKD	509	11	24	544	1.23%	0	0	0	0
Constitution Party	K	221	0	6	227	0.51%	0	0	0	0
Estonian Left Party	EVP	88	0	3	91	0.21%	0	0	0	0
Russian Party in Estonia	VEE	81	0	0	81	0.18%	0	0	0	0
Valid votes		41,371	213	2,685	44,269	100.00%	1	5	3	9
Rejected votes		456	6	0	462	1.03%				
Total polled		41,827	219	2,685	44,731	62.69%				
Registered electors		71,128	219		71,347					

The following candidates were elected:

- Personal mandates - Laine Jänes (RE), 9,303 votes.
- District mandates - Hannes Astok (RE), 1,465 votes; Tõnis Lukas (IRL), 3,979 votes; Silver Meikar (RE), 902 votes; Aadu Must (K), 2,088 votes; and Heljo Pikhof (SDE), 3,270 votes.
- Compensatory mandates - Karel Rüütli (ERL), 558 votes; Toomas Trapido (EER), 1,691 votes; and Peeter Tulviste (IRL), 2,424 votes.

==== 2003 ====
Results of the 2003 parliamentary election held on 2 March 2003:

Party		Votes		Total Votes	%	Seats			
Party		Tartu	Expat- riates	Total Votes	%	Per.	Dis.	Com.	Tot.
Estonian Reform Party	RE	11,634	0	11,634	28.07%	1	1	0	2
Union for the Republic–Res Publica	ÜVE-RP	10,254	47	10,301	24.85%	0	2	1	3
Estonian Centre Party	K	6,426	5	6,431	15.51%	0	1	0	1
Pro Patria Union Party	I	4,720	92	4,812	11.61%	0	1	1	2
Moderate People's Party	RM	3,559	18	3,577	8.63%	0	0	0	0
People's Union of Estonia	ERL	3,331	1	3,332	8.04%	0	0	0	0
Estonian United People's Party	EÜRP	573	0	573	1.38%	0	0	0	0
Estonian Social Democratic Labour Party	ESDTP	228	0	228	0.55%	0	0	0	0
Estonian Christian People's Party	EKRP	209	3	212	0.51%	0	0	0	0
Estonian Independence Party	EIP	181	2	183	0.44%	0	0	0	0
Väino Karo (Independent)		95	0	95	0.23%	0	0	0	0
Russian Party in Estonia	VEE	73	0	73	0.18%	0	0	0	0
Valid votes		41,283	168	41,451	100.00%	1	5	2	8
Rejected votes		429	17	446	1.06%				
Total polled		41,712	185	41,897	57.74%				
Registered electors		72,380	185	72,565					
Turnout		57.63%	100.00%	57.74%					

The following candidates were elected:

- Personal mandates - Andrus Ansip (RE), 7,177 votes.
- District mandates - Margus Hanson (RE), 1,082 votes; Teet Jagomägi (ÜVE-RP), 3,753 votes; Urmo Kööbi (ÜVE-RP), 1,558 votes; Tõnis Lukas (I), 2,120 votes; Sven Mikser (K), 1,327 votes;
- Compensatory mandates - Ene Ergma (ÜVE-RP), 979 votes; and Peeter Tulviste (I), 1,572 votes.

==== 1999 ====
Results of the 1999 parliamentary election held on 7 March 1999:

Party		Votes		Total Votes	%	Seats			
Party		Tartu	Expat- riates	Total Votes	%	Per.	Dis.	Com.	Tot.
Estonian Reform Party	RE	10,151	18	10,169	26.18%	1	1	0	2
Pro Patria Union	I	9,593	270	9,863	25.39%	1	1	1	3
Estonian Centre Party	K	6,785	4	6,789	17.48%	0	1	1	2
Moderate	M	5,875	39	5,914	15.22%	0	1	1	2
Estonian Coalition Party	KE	1,954	2	1,956	5.04%	0	0	0	0
Estonian Country People's Party	EME	1,109	0	1,109	2.85%	0	0	0	0
Russian Party in Estonia	VEE	817	0	817	2.10%	0	0	0	0
Estonian United People's Party	EÜRP	813	0	813	2.09%	0	0	0	0
Estonian Blue Party	ESE	486	5	491	1.26%	0	0	0	0
Estonian Christian People's Party	EKRP	399	0	399	1.03%	0	0	0	0
Farmers' Assembly		277	4	281	0.72%	0	0	0	0
Malle Salupere (Independent)		204	0	204	0.53%	0	0	0	0
Progress Party		40	1	41	0.11%	0	0	0	0
Valid votes		38,503	343	38,846	100.00%	2	4	3	9
Rejected votes		697	16	713	1.80%				
Total polled		39,200	359	39,559	57.39%				
Registered electors		68,567	359	68,926					
Turnout		57.17%	100.00%	57.39%					

The following candidates were elected:

- Personal mandates - Tõnis Lukas (I), 5,667 votes; and Toomas Savi (RE), 6,535 votes.
- District mandates - Jüri Adams (I), 1,914 votes; Andrus Ansip (RE), 898 votes; Tõnu Kauba (K), 1,244 voets; Marju Lauristin (M), 3,585 votes.
- Compensatory mandates - Jaan Leppik (I), 912 votes; Mihkel Pärnoja (M), 237 votes; and Olev Raju (K), 899 votes.

==== 1995 ====
Results of the 1995 parliamentary election held on 5 March 1995:

Party		Votes		Total Votes	%	Seats			
Party		Tartu	Expat- riates	Total Votes	%	Per.	Dis.	Com.	Tot.
Coalition Party and Rural People's Association	KMÜ	7,632	39	7,671	18.56%	0	1	1	2
Estonian Reform Party	RE	7,468	80	7,548	18.26%	1	0	1	2
Pro Patria and ERSP Union	I\ERSP	6,363	449	6,812	16.48%	0	1	1	2
Estonian Centre Party	K	4,028	15	4,043	9.78%	0	0	2	2
Estonian Future Party	TEE	3,676	23	3,699	8.95%	0	0	0	0
The Right Wingers	P	3,090	77	3,167	7.66%	0	0	1	1
Our Home is Estonia	MKOE	2,248	3	2,251	5.45%	0	0	2	2
Moderate	M	1,899	43	1,942	4.70%	0	0	1	1
Better Estonia/Estonian Citizen	PE/EK	1,189	22	1,211	2.93%	0	0	0	0
Justice	Õ	1,023	0	1,023	2.48%	0	0	0	0
Fourth Force	NJ	690	6	696	1.68%	0	0	0	0
Estonian National Federation	ERKL	371	8	379	0.92%	0	0	0	0
Henn Täär (Independent)		324	0	324	0.78%	0	0	0	0
Estonian Farmers' Party	ETRE	220	2	222	0.54%	0	0	0	0
Forest Party		185	1	186	0.45%	0	0	0	0
Blue Party	SE	100	1	101	0.24%	0	0	0	0
Estonian Democratic Union	EDL	56	2	58	0.14%	0	0	0	0
Valid votes		40,562	771	41,333	100.00%	1	2	9	12
Rejected votes		413	0	413	0.99%				
Total polled		40,975	771	41,746	64.99%				
Registered electors		63,463	771	64,234					
Turnout		64.57%	100.00%	64.99%					

The following candidates were elected:

- Personal mandates - Toomas Savi (RE), 6,306 votes.
- District mandates - Rein Järlik (KMÜ), 3,970 votes; and Tõnis Lukas (I\ERSP), 3,147 votes.
- Compensatory mandates - Sergei Issakov (MKOE), 619 votes; Tõnu Kõrda (K), 470 votes; Mati Meos (KMÜ), 436 votes; Aap Neljas (RE), 496 votes; Mihkel Pärnoja (M), 389 votes; Valentin Strukov (MKOE), 1,188 votes; Enn Tarto (P), 2,814 votes; Lauri Vahtre (I\ERSP), 1,743 votes; and Andra Veidemann (K), 1,481 votes.
