= 2023 Estonian parliamentary election =

- 5 March 2023

All 101 seats in the Riigikogu 51 seats needed for a majority
- Opinion polls
- Turnout: 63.53% (▼0.14% pp)
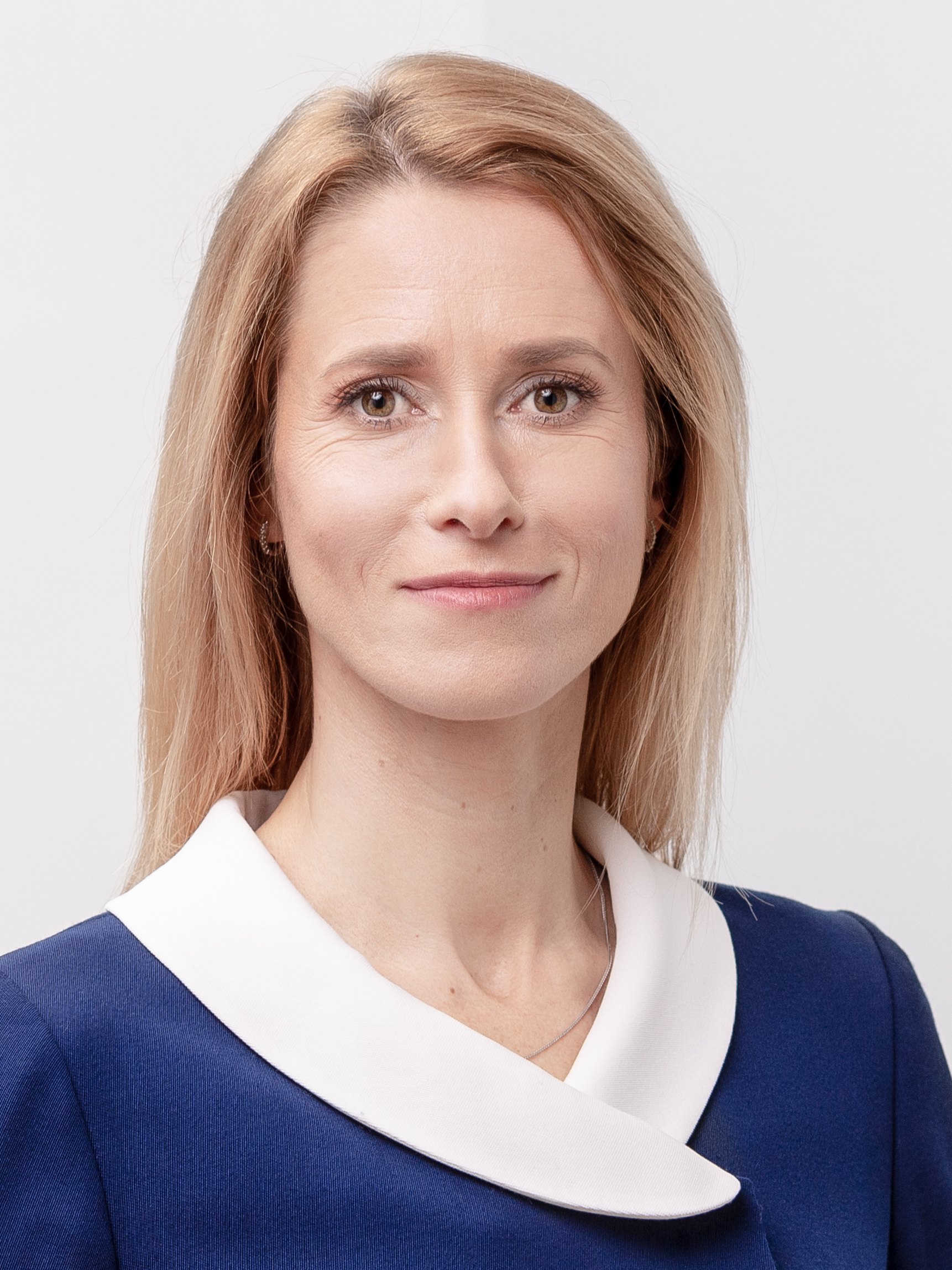

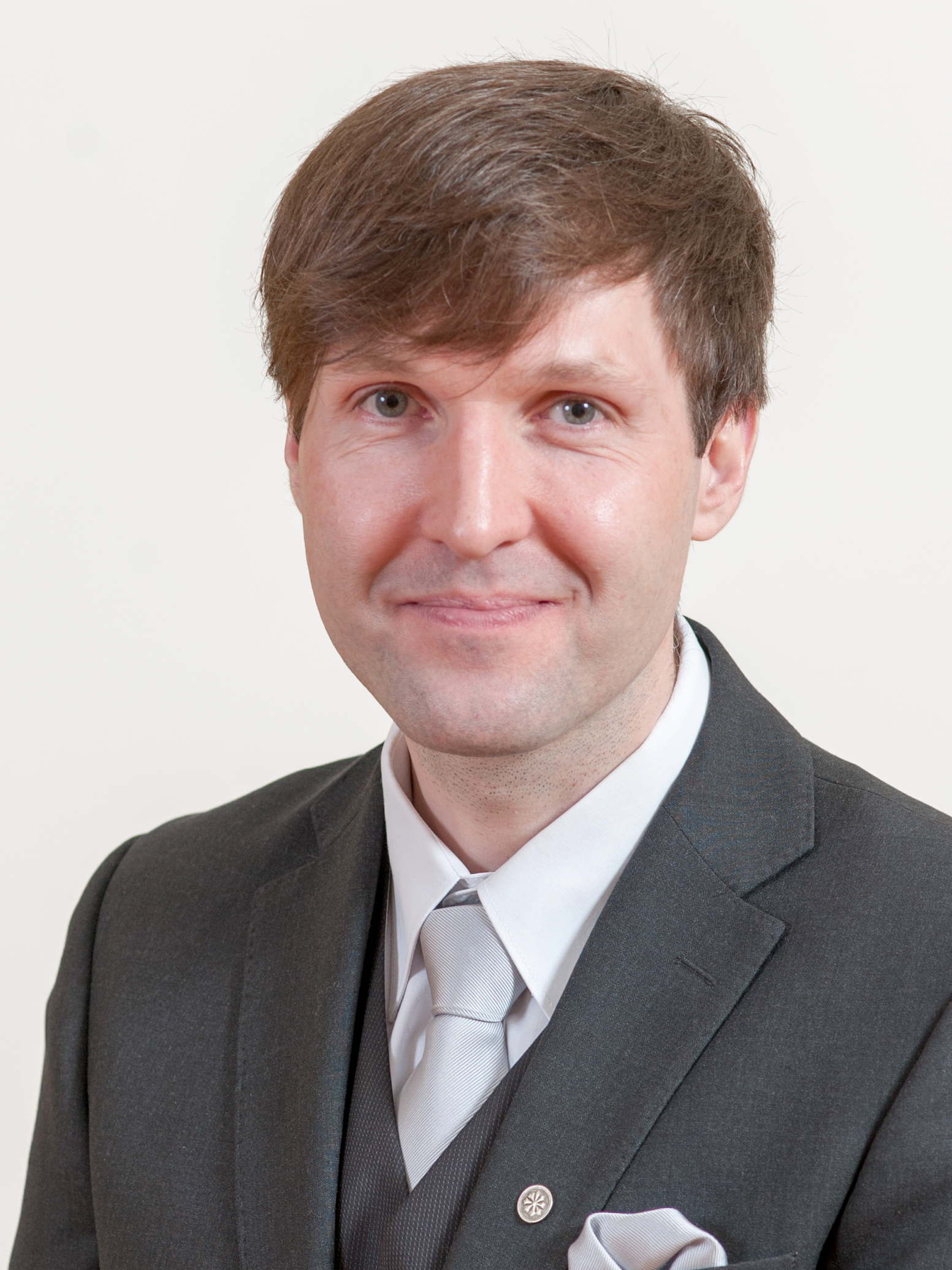

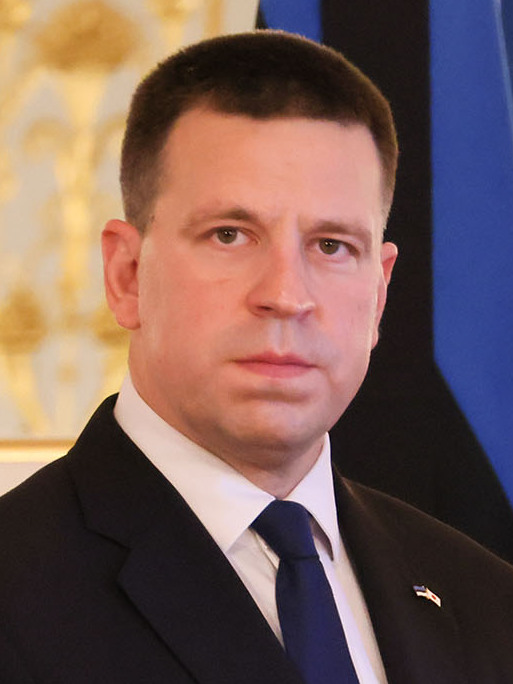

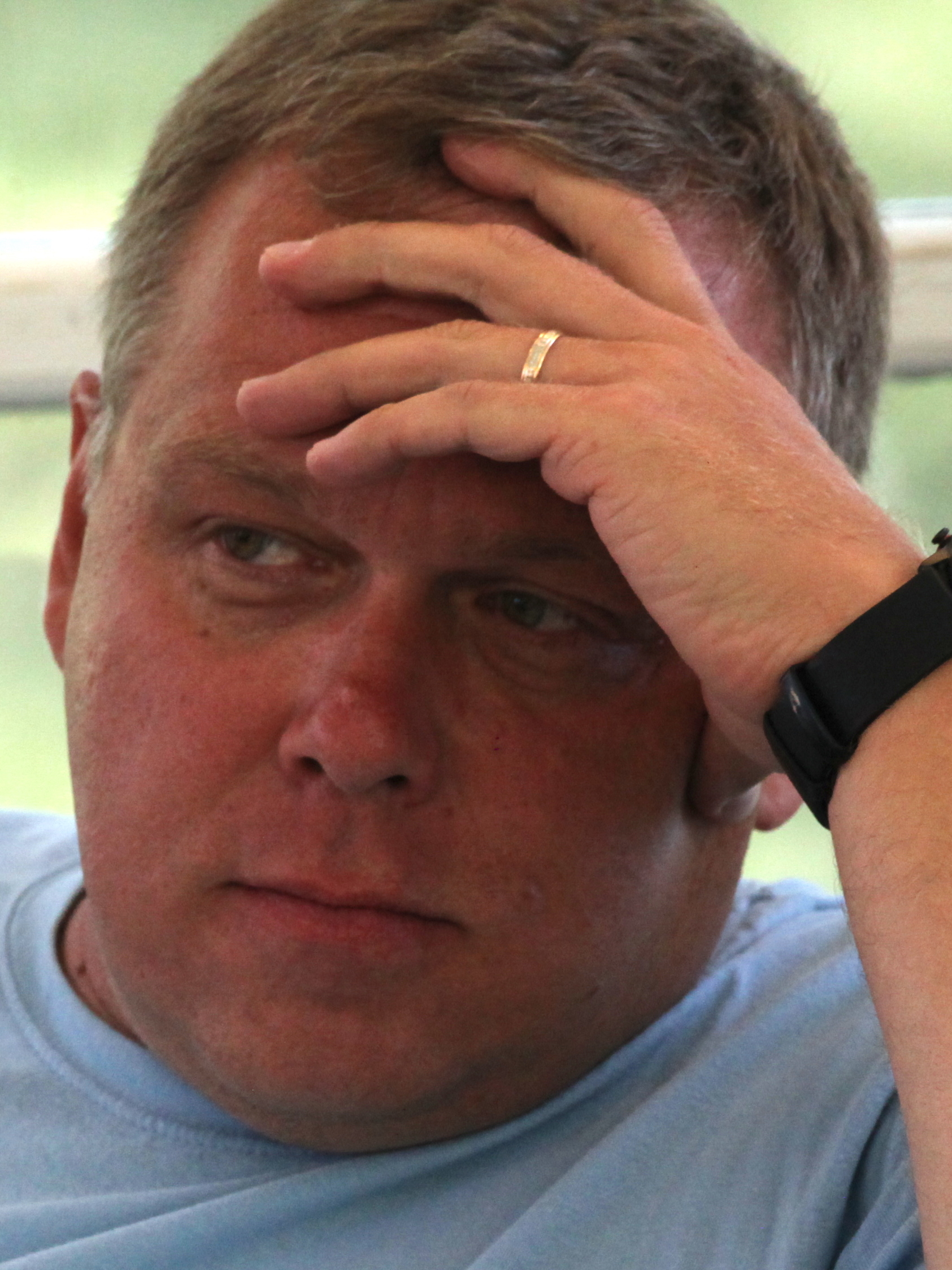

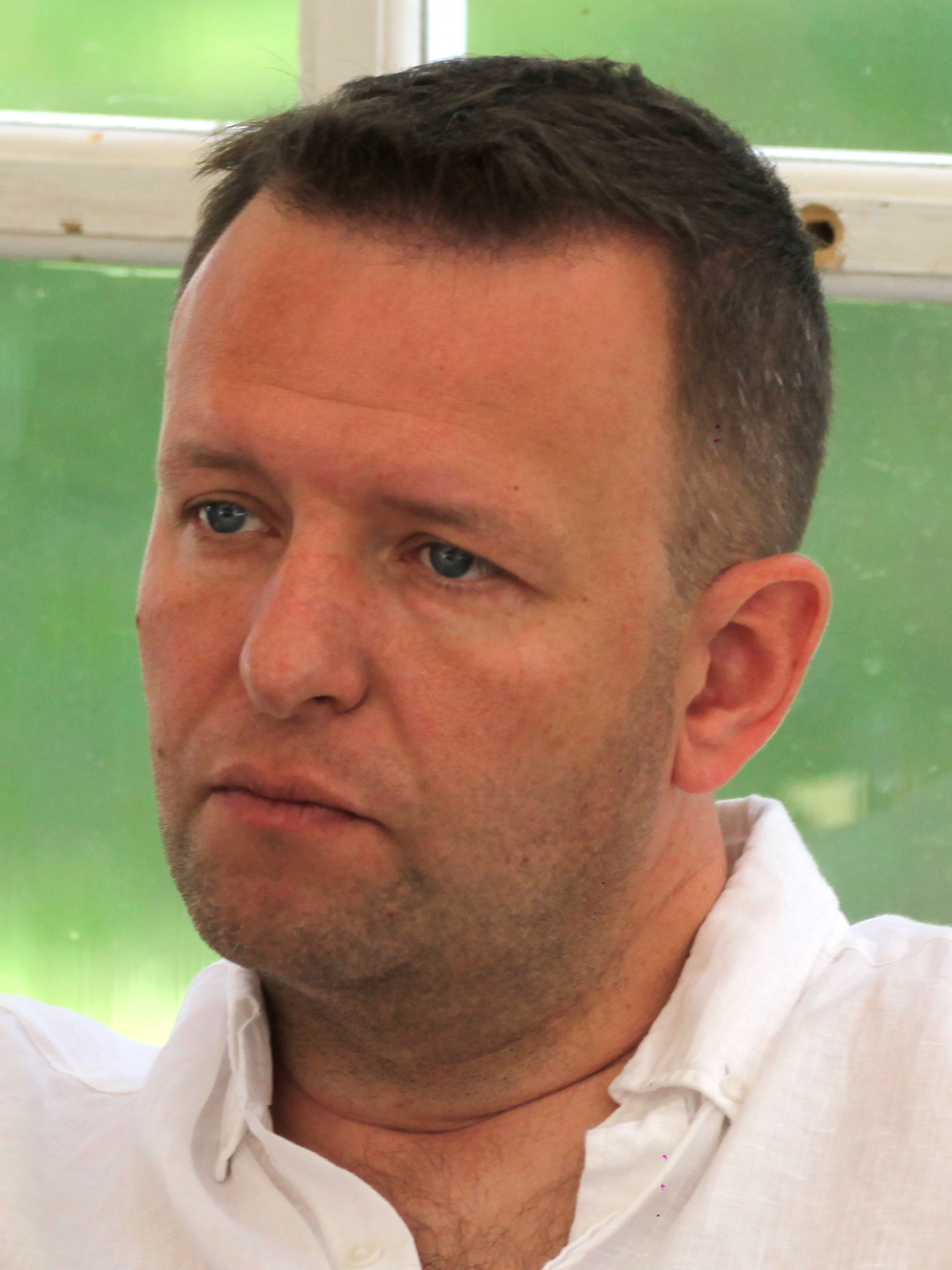

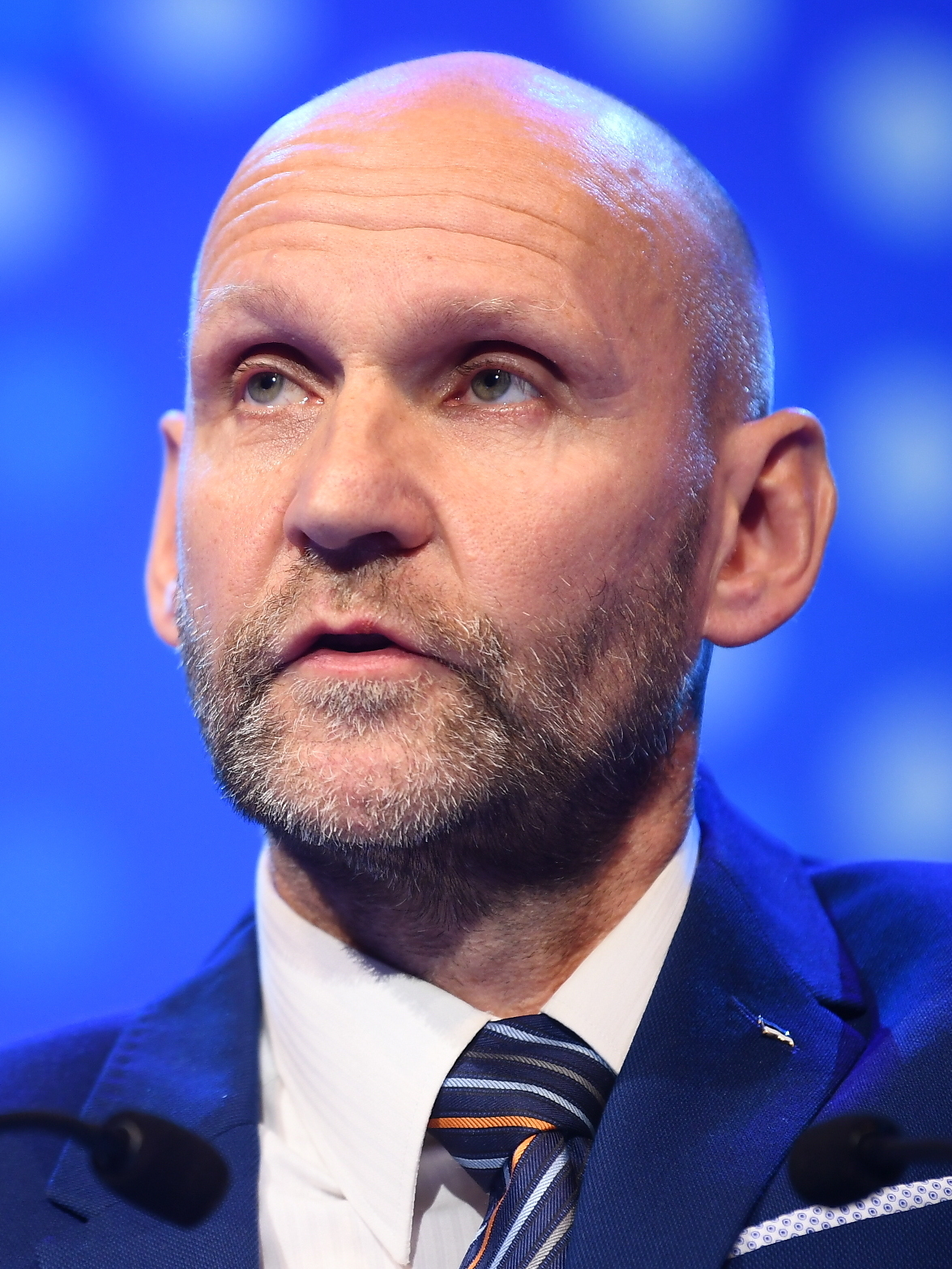
	First party	Second party	Third party
Leader	Kaja Kallas	Martin Helme	Jüri Ratas
Party	Reform	EKRE	Centre
Last election	28.93%, 34 seats	17.76%, 19 seats	23.10%, 26 seats
Seats won	37	17	16
Seat change	▲3	▼2	▼10
Popular vote	190,659	97,959	93,243
Percentage	31.24%	16.05%	15.28%
Swing	▲2.31 pp	▼1.71 pp	▼7.28 pp
	Fourth party	Fifth party	Sixth party
Leader	Lauri Hussar	Lauri Läänemets	Helir-Valdor Seeder
Party	E200	SDE	Isamaa
Last election	4.36%, 0 seats	9.83%, 10 seats	11.44%, 12 seats
Seats won	14	9	8
Seat change	▲14	▼1	▼4
Popular vote	81,347	56,578	50,114
Percentage	13.33%	9.27%	8.21%
Swing	▲8.97 pp	▼0.56 pp	▼3.23 pp
- Distribution of seats and the most voted-for party by constituency
Prime Minister before election
Kaja Kallas
Reform
Prime Minister after election
Kaja Kallas
Reform

Parliamentary elections were held in Estonia on 5 March 2023 to elect all 101 members of the Riigikogu. The officially published election data indicate the victory of the Reform Party, which won 37 seats in total, while the Conservative People's Party of Estonia (EKRE) placed second with 17 seats. The Centre Party won 16 seats, a loss of 10, while Estonia 200 won 14 seats, gaining representation in the Riigikogu.

After the previous parliamentary election in 2019, the Centre Party, led by Jüri Ratas, formed a government with Ratas serving as prime minister. His government was brought down in January 2021 after a corruption investigation, and Kaja Kallas of the Reform Party formed a coalition government with the Centre Party, which collapsed in June 2022. Kallas then formed a government with Isamaa and the Social Democratic Party and remained in the position of prime minister.

In January 2023, the National Electoral Committee announced that nine political parties and ten individual candidates had registered to take part in the 2023 parliamentary election. During the campaign period, issues discussed most extensively regarded the Estonian economy, and the country's national defence and security due to the current Russian invasion of Ukraine. Individuals from contesting political parties also participated in multiple organised debates in January and February 2023. Voting at foreign embassies for Estonians outside the country took place from 18 to 23 February, while Estonian residents could vote during the pre-election period from 27 February to 4 March.

These were the first national elections where more than half of the votes were cast electronically over the Internet. Following the election, EKRE submitted an appeal to the Supreme Court of Estonia, requesting that the results be annulled and claiming that "anomalies and technical errors in the e-voting process had been observed", though the appeal was later dismissed. Reform successfully negotiated afterward with the Social Democratic Party and Estonia 200, forming a government headed by Kallas in April.

== Background ==
The previous parliamentary election, which was held in March 2019, saw the loss of the absolute majority held by Jüri Ratas's first cabinet in the Riigikogu, the unicameral parliament of Estonia. Ratas's Centre Party, Isamaa, and Social Democratic Party (SDE) all suffered a setback in favour of the Reform Party, led by Kallas, and the EKRE. Kersti Kaljulaid, then-president of Estonia, gave a mandate to Kallas to form a government after the election. The Reform Party negotiated with the Centre Party, Isamaa, and SDE but ultimately failed to form a government. After the vote in April 2019, Ratas received the mandate and successfully formed a government with Isamaa and EKRE. Jüri Ratas's second cabinet was sworn in on 29 April 2019.

In January 2021, the Centre Party-led government collapsed after a corruption investigation in which the Centre Party was accused of requesting financial support of up to €1 million within a year in return of the €39 million loan to Hillar Teder's real estate development in Tallinn. In response, Ratas resigned as prime minister of Estonia, while Kallas was invited to form a government. She struck a deal with the Centre Party, with Kallas now serving as prime minister. In June 2022, however, the coalition government between the Centre and Reform Party collapsed due to the Centre Party's opposition to a law on education. This occurred during the 2022 Russian invasion of Ukraine; the Centre Party was seen as close to Russians in Estonia. In response, Kallas opened Triple Alliance negotiations with Isamaa and SDE, successfully forming Kaja Kallas's second cabinet on 15 July 2022.

== Electoral system ==
The Riigikogu is made up of 101 seats and its representatives are elected by open list proportional representation in twelve multi-member constituencies. First, seats are to be filled in 12 constituencies of 5 to 16 seats depending on their population, and the remaining seats, known as "compensation seats", are allocated using the d'Hondt method to all parties that exceeded the 5% electoral threshold, to bring the results in terms of seats as close as possible to those of the vote of the population. In 2023, 75 seats were filled in the constituencies and the remaining 26 were allocated using the d'Hondt method. Voters have the possibility of casting a preferential vote for one of the candidates on the list for which they are voting. If a candidate collects more preferential votes than the amount of the simple quotient in his constituency, they are declared elected even if the list for which they are candidate for fails to cross the 5% electoral threshold.

In November 2022, Alar Karis, the president of Estonia, signed the election decree, setting the date for 5 March 2023. Estonian citizens who are at least 18 years old, are registered in the voting list, have not been declared incapacitated or convicted of a crime by a court, or are serving a prison sentence have the right to vote. In foreign embassies abroad, voting took place from 18 to 23 February 2023, while to vote by mail in foreign countries, the voter had to submit a written request to the foreign mission by 3 February 2023. Advance voting in Estonia took place from 27 February to 4 March, meaning that a voter could vote outside the electoral district of their residence and electronically. Unlike in previous elections, on 5 March voters were able to vote in any precinct within the constituency, while voters who had voted electronically during the advance voting were able to vote on a paper ballot, although their electronic vote would be cancelled. Citizens who were not able to go to the polling stations or to vote electronically could order a ballot box at home and vote between 3 and 5 March 2023. Around eighty foreign observers monitored the election.

=== Seats by electoral district ===
Map	#	Electoral district	Seats
	1	Haabersti, Põhja-Tallinn and Kristiine districts in Tallinn	10
	2	Kesklinn, Lasnamäe and Pirita districts in Tallinn	13
	3	Mustamäe and Nõmme districts in Tallinn	8
	4	Harju (excluding Tallinn) and Rapla counties	16
	5	Hiiu, Lääne and Saare counties	6
	6	Lääne-Viru county	5
	7	Ida-Viru county	6
	8	Järva and Viljandi counties	7
	9	Jõgeva and Tartu counties (excluding Tartu)	7
	10	City of Tartu	8
	11	Võru, Valga and Põlva counties	8
	12	Pärnu county	7
Source: Eesti Rahvusringhääling

=== Pre-election composition ===
Graph of the party split among 101 seats.
Party	Seats
Estonian Reform Party	34
Estonian Centre Party	23
Conservative People's Party of Estonia	19
Isamaa	11
Social Democratic Party	9
Parempoolsed	1
Independents	4
Source: Riigikogu

== Contesting parties ==
The Estonian National Electoral Committee announced that nine political parties and ten individual candidates registered to take part in the 2023 parliamentary election. Their registration numbers and order were determined by a draw of lots.

#	Name	Ideology	Political position	Leader	Total candidates	2019 result	
#	Name	Ideology	Political position	Leader	Total candidates	Votes (%)	Seats
1	Parempoolsed	Fiscal conservatism	Centre-right	Lavly Perling	125	did not exist	
2	Greens	Green politics	Centre-left	Johanna Maria Tõugu	58	1.8%	0 / 101
3	Isamaa	National conservatism	Centre-right to right-wing	Helir-Valdor Seeder	125	11.4%	12 / 101
4	Social Democratic Party	Social democracy	Centre-left	Lauri Läänemets	125	9.8%	10 / 101
5	Conservative People's Party	Right-wing populism	Right-wing to far-right	Martin Helme	125	17.8%	19 / 101
6	Estonia 200	Liberalism	Centre	Lauri Hussar	125	4.4%	0 / 101
7	Reform Party	Classical liberalism	Centre-right	Kaja Kallas	125	28.9%	34 / 101
8	Centre Party	Social liberalism	Centre-left	Jüri Ratas	125	23.1%	26 / 101
9	United Left Party (Note: The leaders of the pro-Russia political group Together participated in the 2023 elections on the list of the Estonian United Left Party. The Tartu County Court did not register the group as a political party on 30 November 2022, as the total number of its members was below the required minimum of 500.)	Russian minority politics	Left-wing	Igor Rosenfeld	25	0.1%	0 / 101
—	Individual candidates	—			10	0.3%	0 / 101

=== Party manifestos and slogans ===
Party	Manifesto (external link)	Other slogan(s)
Parempoolsed	Voice of reason (Estonian: Mõistuse hääl)	
Greens	Green energy, smart development (Estonian: Roheline energia, tark areng)	
Isamaa	There is only one fatherland! (Estonian: On vaid üks isamaa!)	
Social Democratic Party	Self-sufficiency is security! (Estonian: Toimetulek on julgeolek!)	
Conservative People's Party	Let's save Estonia! (Estonian: Päästame Eesti!)	
Estonia 200	It's possible with us (Estonian: Meiega on võimalik)	
Reform Party	Estonia in safe hands (Estonian: Kindlates kätes Eesti)	
Centre Party	Bravely for the people! (Estonian: Julgelt inimeste heaks!)	We are on your side! (Russian: Мы за вас!)
United Left Party (Note: The party's list featured members of Together)	Together for peace (Estonian: Koos rahul nimel)	

== Campaign ==
=== Issues ===
The Eesti Rahvusringhääling and NPR commented that the issues that were discussed during the campaign period were the cost of living crisis, especially regarding rising prices and inflation, as well as issues regarding security and national defence due to the 2022 Russian invasion of Ukraine. Eesti Rahvusringhääling also asserted that the programmes of the contesting parties were largely influenced by the current war in Ukraine. Ellu Saar, a sociology professor, and Triin Lauri, an associate professor at Tallinn University, said that in the programmes of EKRE and Isamaa stated their support to protect the Estonian language in higher education, while Estonia 200 and SDE mention united schools where native Estonian-speaking and Russian-speaking students would study together.

Saar and Lauri commented that the Centre Party had a vague opinion regarding the issue of education. The Estonian Greens and SDE also mentioned school culture, quality of management, reducing path dependence as issues they would tackle. The Reform Party also stated its support for introducing national defence classes in schools, while Isamaa said that there should be more investments in national defence. The Centre Party called for higher salaries for those who work to contribute to the national defence, SDE suggested to implement a new tax regarding defence spending, while EKRE said that militarised border guards should be brought back. Anne Raiste of Eesti Rahvusringhääling said that the contesting parties all shared similar positions regarding foreign policy and that they pledged to implement forms of direct democracy or a more efficient representative democracy. In regards to the 2022–2023 Ukrainian refugee crisis, only EKRE pledged to not accept any new refugees, while the Reform Party stated that it would continue accepting new Ukrainian refugees. Euronews said that EKRE's support in opinion polls had fallen due to alleged links with Russia.

Regarding the economy, Raiste said that the contesting parties had pledged to raise pensions to €1,000 or more. The Centre Party stated its support for the introduction of progressive taxation, while SDE and the Greens had adopted similar positions. On the other hand, Reform stated that it would balance the budget, while EKRE called for reduction of taxes. Estonia 200 said that labour taxes should be lowered, while Parempoolsed promised to not introduce any new taxes. Scholars Liili Abuladze and Luule Sakkeus stated that EKRE and Isamaa put their family policy focuses on families with many children and that the needs of those most vulnerable are hardly addressed. EKRE stated its opposition to transition to sustainable energy to lower energy bills, while the Reform Party pledged to adopt sustainable energy. EKRE also criticised Kallas's Reform Party due to the growing inflation. The Centre Party campaigned on infrastructure investments and affordable housing.

=== Debates ===
2023 Estonian parliamentary election debates
Date	Organisers	P Present N Non-invitee								
Date	Organisers	Reform	EKRE	Centre	E200	SDE	Isamaa	EER	Parempoolsed	Refs
1 March	Eesti Televisioon	P Kaja Kallas	P Martin Helme	P Jüri Ratas	P Lauri Hussar	P Lauri Läänemets	P Helir-Valdor Seeder	N	P Lavly Perling	
27 Feb	Postimees	P Urmas Klaas	P Jaak Valge	P Jaan Toots	P Kristina Kallas	P Krista Aru	P Tõnis Lukas	P Johanna Maria Tõugu	P Elmo Somelar	
23 Feb	Postimees	P Jürgen Ligi	P Jaak Madison	P Jaak Aab	P Ando Kiviberg	P Lauri Läänemets	P Helir-Valdor Seeder	N	P Priit Põllumäe	
23 Feb	Lääne Elu	P Kalle Laanet	P Helle-Moonika Helme	P Janek Mäggi	P Kalev Stoicescu	P Madis Kallas	P Mikk Lõhmus	P Marko Kaasik	P Kristjan Vanaselja	
22 Feb	Vikerraadio	N	N	P Jüri Ratas	P Lauri Hussar	N	N	N	N	
22 Feb	Eesti Televisioon	P Kristen Michal	P Rain Epler	P Taavi Aas	P Marek Reinaas	P Riina Sikkut	P Priit Sibul	N	P Siim Kiisler	
21 Feb	Vikerraadio	N	N	N	N	P Lauri Läänemets	P Helir-Valdor Seeder	N	P Lavly Perling	
20 Feb	Postimees	P Yoko Alender	P Rain Epler	P Ismail Mirzojev	P Gea Kangilaski	P Lemmit Kaplinski	P Priit Humal	P Kaia Solnik	P Indrek Adler	
16 Feb	Postimees	P Jürgen Ligi	P Kalle Grünthal	P Kersti Sarapuu	P Kaspar Taimsoo	P Eimar Veldre	P Ründo Mülts	P Oliver Rohesalu	P Priit Põllumäe	
16 Feb	Vikerraadio	P Signe Riisalo	P Kert Kingo	P Tanel Kiik	P Irja Lutsar	P Helmen Kütt	P Lea Danilson-Järg	N	P Marelle Erlenheim	
16 Feb	Eesti Televisioon	N	N	N	N	N	N	P Marko Kaasik	P Kristjan Vanaselja	
15 Feb	Postimees	P Signe Riisalo	P Kert Kingo	P Monika Haukanõmm	P Diana Ingerainen	P Heljo Pikhof	P Merike Värik	P Susanna Saar	P Toomas Kasemaa	
13 Feb	Postimees	P Andres Sutt	P Raul Siem	P Andrei Korobeinik	P Kristina Kallas	P Riina Sikkut	P Kristjan Järvan	P Marti Soosaar	P Lavly Perling	
9 Feb	Vikerraadio	P Liina Kersna	P Jaak Valge	P Jaak Aab	P Kristina Kallas	P Piret Hartman	N	N	P Tauno Õunapuu	
7 Feb	Vikerraadio	P Annely Akkermann	P Siim Pohlak	P Lauri Laats	P Joakim Helenius	P Lauri Paeveer	P Aivar Kokk	N	P Alar Voitka	
2 Feb	Vikerraadio	P Liina Kersna	P Loone Ots	P Tõnis Mölder	P Kristina Kallas	P Jevgeni Ossinovski	P Tõnis Lukas	N	P Andres Kaarmann	
2 Feb	AmCham; FICE	P Andres Sutt	P Martin Helme	P Tanel Kiik	P Joakim Helenius	P Riina Sikkut	P Urmas Reinsalu	N	N	
1 Feb	Vikerraadio	P Hanno Pevkur	P Jaak Madison	P Neeme Väli	P Margus Tsahkna	P Raimond Kaljulaid	P Urmas Reinsalu	N	P Ilmar Raag	
31 Jan	Vikerraadio	P Meelis Kiili	P Jaak Valge	P Mihhail Kõlvart	P Aleksei Jašin	P Piret Hartman	P Hendrik Agur	N	P Ivo Loide	

== Opinion polls ==
Local regression chart of poll results from 3 March 2019 to 5 March 2023

== Results ==
Election results by municipalities

Voting at Estonian embassies abroad took place between 18 and 23 February 2023. The National Electoral Committee had announced that 47.3% of voters cast their ballot during the pre-election period, which began on 27 February and ended before 5 March, a majority of whom voted online. Voting stations on 5 March 2023 were opened from 9:00 am to 8:00 pm. There were 966,129 citizens that had the right to vote in the election.

The turnout progressed towards 63% by 7:00 pm according to Eesti Rahvusringhääling, with the highest turnout being in the Rapla County and the lowest in the Ida-Viru County. With 312,181 electronic votes, these were the first elections where more than half of votes were cast online. Later that day, Eesti Rahvusringhääling, Reuters, and the Associated Press reported that the Reform Party won the most votes and seats in the Riigikogu, with EKRE placing second and the Centre Party placing third. Additionally, Eesti Rahvusringhääling reported that Estonia 200 would enter the Riigikogu for the first time since its formation.

Party	Votes	%	+/–	Seats	+/–
Estonian Reform Party	190,632	31.24	+2.31	37	+3
Conservative People's Party of Estonia	97,966	16.05	−1.71	17	−2
Estonian Centre Party	93,254	15.28	−7.82	16	−10
Estonia 200	81,329	13.33	+8.97	14	+14
Social Democratic Party	56,584	9.27	−0.56	9	−1
Isamaa	50,118	8.21	−3.23	8	−4
Estonian United Left Party	14,605	2.39	+2.30	0	0
Parempoolsed	14,037	2.30	New	0	New
Estonian Greens	5,886	0.96	−0.86	0	0
Independents	5,888	0.96	+0.68	0	0
Total	610,299	100.00	–	101	0
Valid votes	610,299	99.43			
Invalid/blank votes	3,502	0.57			
Total votes	613,801	100.00			
Registered voters/turnout	966,129	63.53			
Source: National Electoral Committee

=== Results by constituency ===
Constituency	Reform		Centre		EKRE		Isamaa		SDE		E200		EER		Parempoolsed		EÜVP		Independents	
Constituency	%	S	%	S	%	S	%	S	%	S	%	S	%	S	%	S	%	S	%	S
No. 1	31.4	4	20.9	4	9.7	1	5.6	1	10.0	1	15.7	2	1.1	0	2.3	0	3.3	0	0.1	0
No. 2	29.4	4	29.0	5	9.1	1	5.4	1	8.6	1	10.9	2	1.0	0	1.6	0	4.9	0	0.1	0
No. 3	34.7	3	18.9	1	11.7	1	6.5	0	8.9	1	14.2	1	1.1	0	2.1	0	1.9	0	0.0	0
No. 4	40.0	7	10.2	1	14.6	3	8.3	1	7.1	1	13.7	2	0.7	0	3.4	0	1.3	0	0.8	0
No. 5	27.6	1	11.2	1	19.4	1	7.8	0	13.9	1	17.1	1	0.9	0	2.1	0	0.0	0	0.0	0
No. 6	31.1	1	13.4	0	20.5	2	13.7	0	7.5	0	8.7	1	0.5	0	3.0	0	1.5	0	0.2	0
No. 7	14.1	1	25.8	1	8.4	1	4.0	0	7.6	0	8.3	0	0.5	0	1.0	0	14.9	0	15.5	0
No. 8	27.8	2	10.2	1	23.3	1	11.9	1	12.9	2	10.7	0	0.8	0	2.1	0	0.0	0	0.3	0
No. 9	30.4	3	9.2	0	19.7	1	12.0	1	9.0	0	14.6	1	1.0	0	2.6	0	1.5	0	0.0	0
No. 10	35.9	4	7.3	0	14.5	1	8.6	1	9.9	1	18.4	1	1.7	0	2.0	0	1.6	0	0.0	0
No. 11	24.0	5	13.4	1	26.5	2	8.5	1	12.3	1	11.5	1	1.3	0	2.3	0	0.0	0	0.2	0
No. 12	29.5	2	11.4	1	26.0	2	10.0	1	6.7	0	12.8	2	0.8	0	2.2	0	0.7	0	0.0	0
Total	31.24	37	15.28	16	16.05	17	9.27	9	8.21	8	13.33	14	0.96	0	2.30	0	2.39	0	0.96	0
Source: National Electoral Committee, Eesti Rahvusringhääling

== Aftermath ==
Tanel Kiik, the vice-chair of the Centre Party, had said that "the Centre Party would be satisfied if it were to get 20 seats" in the Riigikogu, while Sven Mikser, the former chairman of the SDE, said that "nine mandates is probably the best the party can do in Estonia today". Ratas later described the results as "mediocre". After the publication of e-vote results, Kallas gave a speech and thanked her voters. Kallas was congratulated by Sanna Marin, the prime minister of Finland, and Krišjānis Kariņš, the prime minister of Latvia.

Martin Helme, the leader of EKRE, stated that "he does not trust the e-vote results" and demanded a recount. On 9 March 2023, EKRE made an appeal to the Supreme Court of Estonia, requesting the results to be annulled and claiming that "several anomalies and technical errors in the e-voting process had been observed". Lawyer Paul Keres of EKRE also claimed that the e-voting process is unconstitutional. This case was dismissed on 13 March.

=== Government formation ===
As the party that won the most seats in the election, Reform Party began negotiations between the parties to attempt to form a government. Eesti Rahvusringhääling reported that while experts predicted that the Reform–Estonia 200–SDE coalition would be formed after the election, Kallas only ruled out a coalition with EKRE. A day after the election, Kallas said "that it is clear that voters expect to see Estonia 200 in the government", while she also said that there are four possible coalitions for the Reform Party to form. Kallas invited Estonia 200 and SDE for government talks on 7 March 2023. Lauri Läänemets, the leader of SDE, confirmed on 7 April that the Reform Party, Estonia 200, and SDE reached an agreement. A day later, Kallas revealed the composition of her new cabinet. The coalition agreement was signed on 10 April. Soon after, Kallas became the prime-minister designate, with the Riigikogu approving the coalition government on 12 April. Her cabinet was sworn in on 17 April.

== See also ==
- Members of the 15th Riigikogu
