= Estonian Nationalists and Conservatives =

Estonian Nationalists and Conservatives Eesti Rahvuslased ja Konservatiivid
- Abbreviation: ERK
- Leader: Rein Suurkask
- Founded: 29 June 2024
- Split from: Conservative People's Party of Estonia
- Membership (2024): ▲1045
- Ideology: Estonian nationalism Factions: Ethnofuturism (Note: Blue Awakening, the former youth wing of EKRE that joined ERK has been described as ethnofuturist. The founder of Blue Awakening and a major proponent of ethnofuturism, Ruuben Kaalep, was among the founders of ERK and is currently a member of the party's leadership.); Agrarianism
- Political position: Right-wing to far-right
- Colours: Gold; Dark grey White
- Riigikogu: 0 / 101
- European Parliament: 0 / 7

Website
- eerk.ee

Estonian Nationalists and Conservatives (Estonian: Eesti Rahvuslased ja Konservatiivid, abbr. ERK) is a nationalist political party in Estonia founded in 2024. The founders of the party have described themselves as nationalist and conservative. Other topics the novel party intends to focus on include national defense, the economy, the population crisis, local nature and direct democracy. The party was formed after the expulsion of several key figures in EKRE which was followed by the exodus of hundreds more.

In February 2026, the party approved a merger with the Freedom Party – Farmers' Assembly. The merger was formalized in September 2026.

== History ==
After the loss in the 2023 Estonian parliamentary election, there had been a debate within EKRE whether to pacify the rhetoric of the party to come off as more moderate and suitable as a potential coalition partner whenever the chance should arise for EKRE to enter a government coalition. Party leader Martin Helme, his father and former party leader Mart Helme alongside reported allies such as MPs Helle-Moonika Helme, Kert Kingo, Rain Epler, and Anti Poolamets opposed the idea, while MPs Jaak Valge, Henn Põlluaas, and MEP Jaak Madison tacitly supported it. So did upcoming leadership election candidate Silver Kuusik, who also sought to improve the internal democracy of the party.

On 9 June 2024, the day of the 2024 European Parliament election in Estonia and one week before the leadership election in EKRE, Martin Helme accused Valge and Põlluaas of a coup attempt within the party during his weekly radio show, who later dismissed the claim and said that "it is perfectly natural if there is more than one candidate" in the leadership election.

During EKRE's election night on the same day, Põlluaas and Madison both confirmed ex-EKRE member Peeter Ernits' claim that "the party's board heard Mart Helme's speech in which he announced that Russia is waging a holy war in Ukraine and that he supports it. The members of the party's board who heard the story were of such visibly upset by the story and tried to call the vice-chairman to order". This confirmation was cited amongst the reasons for the expulsion of Põlluaas, Valge and Kuusik from EKRE for "damaging the reputation of the party" two days later. Madison left shortly thereafter, followed by MPs Alar Laneman, Leo Kunnas and Ants Frosch.

On 16 June 2024, the expelled EKRE members Helle Kullerkupp, Silver Kuusik, MPs Henn Põlluaas, Jaak Valge, as well as MEP Jaak Madison, former MP Ruuben Kaalep and several others announced their intention to form the new party ERK.

In December 2024, Henn Põlluaas, Peeter Ernits and Ants Frosch left the party, citing internal conflicts and dissatisfaction with the party's direction, including a lack of internal democracy.

== Ideology ==
The party describes itself as "national conservative". A majority of the current leadership of Blue Awakening (previously the youth wing of EKRE) decided in July 2024 to join ERK. Blue Awakening has been described as ethnofuturist, and its founder and a major proponent of ethnofuturism, Ruuben Kaalep, is currently a member of the party's leadership.

=== Cultural policy ===
The ideological manifesto of the Estonian Nationalists and Conservatives states that "Estonia, the only country of Estonians, must remain a nation-state", adding that "mass immigration is an existential threat to the Estonian nation-state" and that ERK wants "Estonia to continue as a part of European civilization with ancient, Christian and humanist roots". The party supports "the preservation and promotion of Estonian dialects and indigenous regional languages in school education and elsewhere". The party is opposed to multiculturalism.

=== Economic policy ===
ERK's manifesto states that "both the domestic and global economy must serve the interests of people, instead of people serving the economy" but adds that government should refrain from interfering in "areas that function by themselves according to the rules of the market economy". ERK supports nuclear power. The manifesto also states that the party considers it reasonable " to enable a favorable legal environment for the development of blockchain-based technologies, including cryptocurrencies, insofar as autonomous currency systems based on these technologies can increase the well-being of people in Estonia".

Regarding taxation, the party states that "the excess profits of foreign capital must be taxed, including the imposition of a flat national protection tax on international banks in return for the stable economic and political environment provided to them" and that "the income tax rate must be linked to the number of children". ERK pushes to simplify the tax system "so that it is understandable to the common man even without a tax calculator".

=== Environmental policy ===
The party's manifesto states that the party's views on nature conservation are "not driven by sloganeering and fake greenism" and that ERK's goals are "the protection of natural diversity and heritage landscapes". ERK views forests as "a resource for the entire nation-state", considering it important "to further protect natural sanctuaries and complete their mapping".

=== Social policy ===
The party claims that marriage "is a union of a man and a woman" and calls for a referendum on "the concept of marriage". ERK wants to use "counseling and other national measures" to "ensure a definite reduction in domestic violence and abortion". The party claims that freedom of religion, opinion, thought, speech and press "are rights that arise from human nature itself and should not be restricted".

=== Institutional reform ===
ERK opposes online voting. The party supports amending the Constitution to give citizens the right to initiate referendums. ERK also wants to change the election of the President of Estonia from an indirect vote in the Riigikogu to a direct election.

=== Foreign policy ===
ERK believes that "Estonia's membership in the European Union is justified as long as the resulting benefit to the Estonian state and people outweighs the harm" and supports Estonian membership of NATO as "Estonia's membership in NATO has become inevitable in the security situation". The party's foreign policy pushes for closer cooperation with Central and Central and Eastern European countries as well as with Nordic countries.

Regarding Russia and the Russian invasion of Ukraine, ERK states that "Russian chauvinism is an existential threat for Estonia" which the party "cannot justify, let alone justify, admire or support in any context". The manifesto states that "we firmly support Ukraine's struggle for freedom. Ukrainians must be able to decide for themselves the fate of their country, and we respect Ukraine's decisions. As humanists, we are in favor of concluding peace as soon as possible, but the terms of peace must guarantee the independence, security and territorial integrity of Ukraine and other European countries". The party cautiously supports allowing Ukrainian refugees to seek refuge in Estonia.
