= Züleyxa Izmailova =

Estonian journalist, environmental activist, and politician (born 1985)

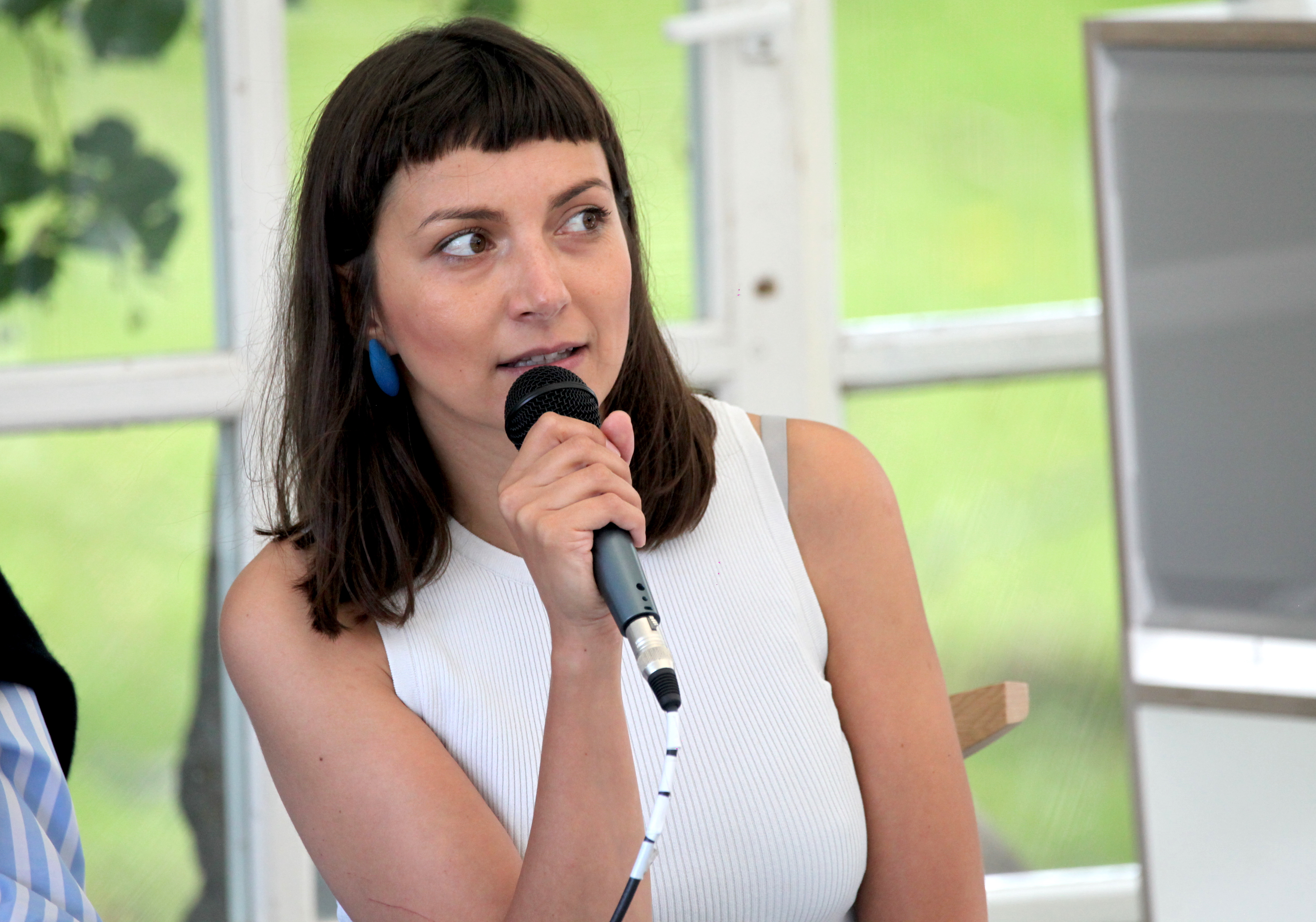

Leader of the Estonian Greens
- In office 27 March 2017 – 10 February 2022
- Preceded by: Aleksander Laane
- Succeeded by: Johanna Maria Tõugu; Marko Kaasik

Member of the Riigikogu
- Incumbent
- Assumed office 20 May 2023
- Preceded by: Johanna-Maria Lehtme

Personal details
- Born: 15 June 1985 (age 41) Tallinn, then part of Estonian SSR, Soviet Union
- Party: SDE (2005-2012; 2024–present)
- Other political affiliations: Estonian Greens (2015–2022); E200 (2022–2024)
- Domestic partner: Joonas Laks
- Children: 3

Züleyxa "Zuzu" Izmailova (born 13 June 1985) is an Estonian journalist, environmental activist and politician, who was the leader of the Estonian Greens from March 2017 to February 2022.

== Biography ==
Izmailova was born to an Azerbaijani father and Estonian mother. Her partner is fellow member of the Estonian Greens Board Joonas Laks, with whom she has two children. Izmailova studied geodesy at Kehtna Vocational Education Center from 2005 to 2008, but did not graduate.

=== Political career ===
From 2005 to 2012, she was a member of the Social Democratic Party. On 27 March 2017, Izmailova was elected as the leader of the Estonian Greens party. She was one of the candidates for the mayoralty of Tallinn in 2017. On 9 November 2017, she became one of the deputy mayors of Tallinn, with Taavi Aas as the mayor of Tallinn. She is also a noted environmental activist, staging several protests about the environmental concerns of the Rail Baltica project, as well as advocating for the strengthening of environmental regulations in Estonia.

Züleyxa Izmailova left the Estonian Greens in February 2022 and in May 2022 announced she had joined Eesti 200. In May 2023 she entered the Estonian Parliament following the resignation of Johanna-Maria Lehtme. In June 2024 she was ejected from Estonia 200 and subsequently rejoined the Social Democratic Party.

=== Public statements and apology ===
In early August 2025, Züleyxa Izmailova posted a message on the social media platform X (formerly Twitter) describing negative experiences involving Russian-speaking individuals in Estonia. The post included references to an outdoor swimming pool in Nõmme being “packed with Russians” and other incidents, such as being spoken to “in their disgusting language” and seeing people smoking or spitting into the pool. She concluded the post by saying she was “sick and tired of the tibla mentality,” a phrase ERR News described as a derogatory term aimed at Russians.Oja, Barbara (4 August 2025). "Social Democratic Party MP apologizes after social media post targeting Russians". ERR News.

The post was deleted shortly afterward, and Izmailova issued a public apology, stating that she regretted her choice of words and had not intended to target all Russian speakers. She referred to her personal background—being raised in Maardu and having lost her father, who served in the Soviet army and was killed in Baku—and stated that her criticism was directed at a certain mentality rather than an ethnic group.

== Awards ==
- 2016 – Anne & Stiil magazine Woman of the Year
