= Valdur =

Female given name

- Gender: Male
- Language: Estonian
- Name day: 18 April

Origin
- Region of origin: Estonia

Valdur is an Estonian masculine given name. Valdur's name day is April 18th.

As of 1 January 2024, 499 men in Estonia have the first name Valdur, making it the 287th most popular male name in the country. The name is most commonly found in Valga County, where 8.34 per 10,000 men bear the name. Notable people bearing the name include:

- Valdur Helm (born 1938), conductor, pedagogue and music teacher
- Valdur Himbek (1925–1991), film director and actor
- Valdur Lahtvee (born 1958), politician
- Valdur Mikita (born 1970), writer and semiotician
- Valdur Ohakas (1925–1998), Estonian painter
- Valdur Ohmann (born 1958), historian and archivist
- Valdur Paakspuu (1934–1991), ornithologist and nature conservationist
