= Riigikogu electoral district no. 10 (1992–1995) =

Electoral district of Estonia

Electoral district no. 10
- Valimisringkond nr 10
- Former Electoral District for the Riigikogu
- County: Tartu

Former Electoral District
- Created: 1992
- Abolished: 1995
- Seats: 13 (1992–1995)
- Replaced by: District no. 8; District no. 9

Electoral district no. 10 (Estonian: Valimisringkond nr 10) was one of the multi-member electoral districts of the Riigikogu, the national legislature of Estonia. The district was established in 1992 when the Riigikogu was re-established following Estonia's independence from the Soviet Union. It was abolished in 1995. It was conterminous with the county of Tartu.

== Election results ==
=== Detailed ===
Party has received at least 5% of the vote nationally and is entitled to compete for district seats.

==== 1992 ====
Results of the 1992 parliamentary election held on 20 September 1992:

Party		Votes			Total Votes	%	Seats			
Party		Tartu	Tartu County	Expat- riates	Total Votes	%	Per.	Dis.	Com.	Tot.
Pro Patria	I	11,989	4,331	653	16,973	29.94%	1	2	1	4
Greens	R	3,652	1,769	30	5,451	9.62%	1	0	0	1
Estonian National Independence Party	ERSP	3,075	1,338	577	4,990	8.80%	0	1	1	2
Popular Front of Estonia	R	3,065	1,048	44	4,157	7.33%	0	0	2	2
Moderate	M	2,364	1,709	40	4,113	7.25%	0	0	2	2
Safe Home	KK	2,190	1,599	20	3,809	6.72%	0	0	1	1
Farmers' Assembly		1,169	2,578	20	3,767	6.64%	0	0	0	0
Estonian Union of Pensioners	EPL	1,647	921	1	2,569	4.53%	0	0	0	0
Estonian Citizen	EK	1,825	645	27	2,497	4.40%	0	0	1	1
Estonian Entrepreneurs' Party	EEE	1,432	559	11	2,002	3.53%	0	0	0	0
National Party of the Illegally Repressed	ÕRRE	1,005	623	30	1,658	2.92%	0	0	0	0
Independent Kings	SK	991	526	7	1,524	2.69%	0	0	2	2
Aleksei Zõbin (Independent)		405	698	0	1,103	1.95%	0	0	0	0
Eduard Vääri (Independent)		531	194	6	731	1.29%	0	0	0	0
Lembit Sulbi (Independent)		410	151	1	562	0.99%	0	0	0	0
Left Option	V	305	102	1	408	0.72%	0	0	0	0
Handicapped Union		172	62	1	235	0.41%	0	0	0	0
Ago Sütt (Independent)		24	92	0	116	0.20%	0	0	0	0
Eino Korjus (Independent)		14	13	0	27	0.05%	0	0	0	0
Valid votes		36,265	18,958	1,469	56,692	100.00%	2	3	10	15
Rejected votes		819	336	0	1,155	2.00%				
Total polled		37,084	19,294	1,469	57,847	66.66%				
Registered electors		56,402	28,886	1,495	86,783					
Turnout		65.75%	66.79%	98.26%	66.66%					

The following candidates were elected:

- Personal mandates - Rein Järlik (R*), 5,220 votes; and Enn Tarto (I), 9,195 votes.
- District mandates - K. Jaak Roosaare (ERSP), 947 votes; Tiit Sinissaar (I), 784 votes; and Lauri Vahtre (I), 3,490 votes.
- Compensatory mandates - Liia Hänni (M), 2,672 votes; Mati Hint (R), 1,298 votes; Kalle Jürgenson (I), 299 votes; Jaan Kaplinski (R), 1,317 votes; Kalle Kulbok (SK), 878 votes; Lembit Küüts (SK), 75 votes; Peeter Lorents (KK), 212 votes; Viktor Niitsoo (ERSP), 886 votes; Mart-Olav Niklus (EK), 1,826 votes; and Mihkel Pärnoja (M), 254 votes.
