= Marek Strandberg =

Estonian politician

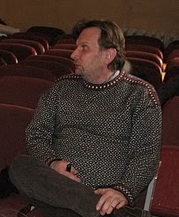
Marek Strandberg

Marek Strandberg (born 25 September 1965 in Tallinn) is an Estonian materials scientist, businessman, caricaturist and politician. He has been member of XI Riigikogu.

He is a member of Estonian Greens.
