= Heljo Pikhof =

Estonian politician (born 1958)

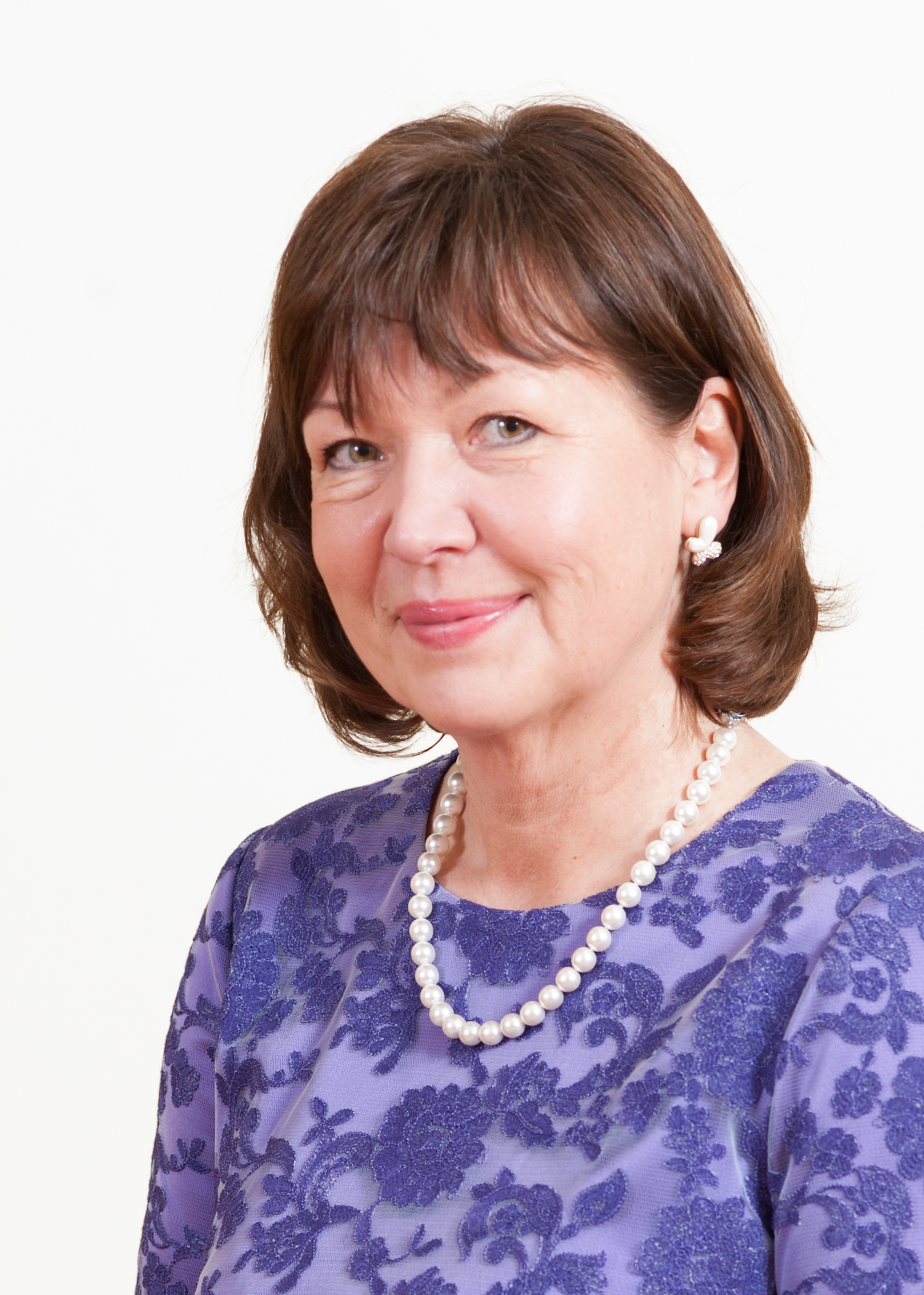

Member of Tartu City Council

Member of XIV Riigikogu

Personal details
- Born: October 20, 1958 (age 67) Tartu, Estonia
- Party: Social Democratic Party
- Education: Tartu University
- Occupation: Politician

Heljo Pikhof (born 20 October 1958) is an Estonian politician. She has a been member of the XI, XII, XIII and XIV Riigikogu.

She was born in Tartu. In 1977 she graduated from Tartu Secondary School No. 2 (nowadays Miina Härma Gymnasium). In 1985 she graduated from Tartu University in law.

Since 1996 (intermittently) she has been a member of Tartu City Council.

Since 1996 she has been a member of Moderates/People's Party Moderates/Social Democratic Party.

She ran for the Riigikogu in the 2023 elections and received 1,242 votes in electoral district number 10, which covers Tartu city, securing her election as a member of the Riigikogu.
