= Estonian Greens =

Political party in Estonia

Estonian Greens Erakond Eestimaa Rohelised
- Chairpersons: Kaia Solnik; Rasmus Lahtvee
- Founded: 25 November 2006
- Membership (2024): ▼786
- Ideology: Green politics; Social liberalism
- Political position: Centre-left
- European affiliation: European Green Party
- International affiliation: Global Greens
- Colours: Green
- Riigikogu: 0 / 101
- European Parliament: 0 / 7
- Municipalities: 0 / 1,717

Website
- rohelised.ee

The Estonian Greens (Estonian: Erakond Eestimaa Rohelised, EER) is a green political party in Estonia. Founded in 2006, the party held six seats in the Riigikogu from 2007 to 2011. Its objective is to ensure that Estonia's development is environmentally friendly, sustainable, politically stable and economically efficient.

== History ==
=== 1990s ===
The Estonian Green Movement (Estonian: Eesti Roheline Liikumine) was founded in May 1988. Its chairman, forestry scientist Professor Toomas Frey, was Minister of the Environment from 1990 to 1991.

The first anti-communist Estonian Green Party (Eesti Roheline Partei) was founded on 19 August 1989. A rival Green Party (Eesti Roheline Erakond), under the leadership of former communist Vello Pohla, was founded in May 1990. In 1992, the two parties merged and the Estonian Greens (Erakond Eesti Rohelised). One representative of the Greens' electoral coalition, Rein Järlik, was elected to parliament in September 1992. The Estonian Greens were removed as a registered party on 21 May 1998 due to its lack of the required 1,000 members. Some former Estonian Greens members then joined the Estonian Centre Party.

=== 2000s ===
Organiser Valdur Lahtvee reported that on 1 November 2006, more than 1,000 members had been recruited for the Green Party Initiative Group to register as a political party. This opened the doors to run in the March 2007 Estonian parliamentary election.

The current Estonian Greens party (Erakond Eestimaa Rohelised), was founded on 25 November 2006, when the party held its founding general assembly with 361 of the total 1,203 founding members present. The party's programme was ratified and a board of 13 members elected. According to Marek Strandberg, its goal was to win at least five Riigikogu seats in the upcoming elections and to form a Greens parliamentary caucus. The party's main programmes were to protect Estonia's forests, sea and other resources; to combat climate change, and to promote direct democracy. Economically, the party supported innovation and conservative fiscal policies. In the 2007 Estonian parliamentary election, the Estonian Greens received 39,265 votes (7.1 per cent of the total) and held six seats in the Riigikogu until 2011.

=== 2010s ===
The Greens received 21,824 votes (3.8 percent of the total) in the March 2011 parliamentary election, losing their six seats in the Riigikogu. In the 2015 parliamentary elections, the Greens received 0.9 per cent of the vote and no seats in parliament.

Züleyxa Izmailova was elected the party's chairwoman in March 2017. Although the Greens received 1.8 per cent of the vote in the 2019 election under her leadership, they did not win any seats due to the five-percent threshold.

=== 2020s ===
After a disappointing showing in the 2021 municipal elections, where, with the exception of 2 seats in the municipal council of Antsla, the party did not manage to gain any seats nationwide, Izmailova announced she would not re-run for party leadership. Izmailova subsequently left the party.

At the party congress in 2023, the party elected Johanna Maria Tõugu and Marko Kaasik as party co-chairs. After a disappointing showing at the 2023 Estonian parliamentary election, where the party managed to garner a mere 0.96% of the vote and once again failed to gain any seats in parliament, Tõugu and Kaasik announced stepping down from party leadership. Tõugu subsequently left the party and joined the Estonian Social Democratic Party.

In 2024, the Green party congress elected Evelyn Sepp and Mihkel Kangur as party co-chairs. Under new leadership the party participated in the 2024 European Parliament elections. The party garnered a result of 0.62% and failed to gain any seats in the European Parliament.

== Ideology ==
The Estonian Greens have a democratic parliamentary policy aimed at ensuring that the development of the Republic of Estonia is environmentally friendly, sustainable, politically stable and economically efficient. The party opposes the excessive centralisation of political, administrative and economic power, favouring autonomous decision-making and the importance of citizen participation in decision-making at all levels.

It vigorously supports science: involving researchers in decision-making processes, implementing research results, strengthening health care and guaranteeing public access to health services, a better understanding of educational content and organisation, the development of information technologies, making proposed solutions more reliable and humane, and supporting national co-operatives. It intends to encourage innovation in industry and agriculture, and the abandonment of oil shale as fuel (PÕXIT).

=== Economic policies ===
The party encourages innovative, knowledge-based, environmentally responsible and employee- and consumer-friendly businesses. It supports fair resource and environmental charges which take into account the cost of the oil-shale sector. Social and economic problems associated with the closure of the oil-shale sector in Ida-Viru County can be mitigated with resource royalties.

==== Energy sector ====
The party's objectives in the energy sector are:

- Zero carbon emissions in Estonia by 2050. Eliminate oil-shale energy no later than 2030, and in 2035 (at the latest) eliminate shale-oil production. The Auvere power plant and some oil-shale reserves are preserved, since its long-term exploitation is economically detrimental in the event of a significant increase in the price of CO_{2} quotas.
- Prepare an action plan anticipating the steps and timetable to switch to renewable energy, while addressing employment and sustainable development in Ida-Viru County.
- Gather scientists and entrepreneurs to find ways to earn more with less oil shale as a raw material for the chemical industry. Support the decentralised production of renewable energy such as wind farms, geothermal energy and solar panels. Eliminate legal obstacles to small electricity producers. Ensure that each household can sell electricity if desired. Support the development of the smart grid. Make energy savings tax-free.
- Develop a plan for transitioning to renewable energy for land-based and floating transport. Support the purchase of electric vehicles, including e-bikes. Selling electric cars at a discount. Develop ICT solutions for the development of flexible cars, rental and bike-sharing systems, and demand-driven transport.
- Incentivize rail transport over road transport. Support a faster rail network based on existing routes (including the connection to Riga), and rehabilitate liquidated railways. An international rail connection should not be at the expense of the local network or nature. Work on solutions using block-circuit technology to create local rail.
- Creation a legal environment supporting business management. Support trade associations which produce renewable energy and dedicate themselves to small-scale production and service. Encourage investment in science. Support small producers and the creation of local businesses, focusing on cooperative entrepreneurship. Provide loan guarantees for small businesses and trade associations.
- Support national industrial enterprises which are resource-efficient and produce practical, publicly funded research and development results. Emphasize automation over the introduction of foreign labour. Encourage a transition to shorter work hours. In the long term, the party believes that it is essential to have an unconditional basic income (civic wage).
- Bonds offered to citizens and local businesses and foreign bank loans to cover the credit crunch of Estonia's state-owned enterprises and to foster ecological sustainability. Investments in rural areas, cooperative entrepreneurship, energy production, organic foods, and energy savings in housing will create lucrative jobs.
- Replace the current business model of "buy, use, and toss" with a circular economy. Support product-life extensions, longer production guarantees and assistance with VAT relief for repairs.
- Encourage the application of environmental principles in public procurement and accounting based on long-term operating costs, pollutant emissions, and energy consumption when evaluating tenders. Offers with the lowest life-cycle costs and negative environmental impacts must be prioritised. Stop the production and use of disposable plastic products, and regulate the production of paper waste.
- Increase the share of environmental activities in the state budget, taking into account the cost of economic activity to the environment and health. Avoid wood as a source of renewable energy, and abolish wood-production projects in low-energy plants. Support the revival of the meristem method for the production of disease-free plants in agriculture and horticulture. Make Estonia an organic-farming country. Limit the use of concentrated pesticides and mineral fertilizers through taxation. Prohibit large-scale use of glyphosate herbicides in agriculture and landscaping. Encourage cultivation methods which maintain (or increase) the fertility of agricultural land.
- Oppose cultivation of genetically modified organisms (GMOs) in an open environment and their sale to consumers. Call for Estonia to be a GMO-free country. Oppose the patenting of plants and animals. Reduce taxes for producers and processors of organic products.
- Promote nature tourism and support activities which contribute to the preservation of natural landscapes, ecosystems and natural communities.

=== Community and state ===
The party aims to make Estonia a country of participatory, direct democracy based on regular referendums, similar to Switzerland. Legislate by referendum the introduction of a new legislative provision or appeal of a Riigikogu decision, an opportunity offered by the first period of independence by the Estonian constitution. To organise a referendum, a specified number of signatures must be collected. The referendum will be preceded by a month-long public debate and equal media coverage of both sides.

The Estonian Greens support a master's-degree requirement for all ministers. The Minister of Education and Research must have a PhD or equivalent training. The party opposes the defamation of others, distinguishing between defamation and freedom of expression. It aims to amend legislation governing maritime affairs so Estonian shipowners' ships return to the Estonian flag. The party favours a personal election by the single transferable vote method used in the 1990 Supreme Council elections to allow all suitable candidates to be selected, regardless of party affiliation. It supports lowering the voting age to 16, and the expansion of local-government revenue base by transferring most personal-income and corporate taxes to local governments.

The party supports security authorities, the police and the tax administration, and civilian control of their activities. It supports shorter compulsory military service and longer recurrent training. The Estonian Defence League should be strengthened, with greater cooperation with the Estonian Defence Forces. The party supports a reduction in the country's defence budget to two per cent of GDP, and an expanded capacity for the development and implementation of defence and security technologies by participating in international exercises.

=== Environmental protection ===
The party supports activities which help preserve natural landscapes, ecosystems and communities, increase the self-purification of water bodies and improve ecological status. It aims to stop deforestation, making the lumber industry sustainable and limiting cutting to less than five million cubic meters at least until 2030 to compensate for previous overcutting. Loggers (public and private) must negotiate with local communities, presenting a list of benefits and impacts of the planned logging. The local community must have a pre-emptive right to purchase forest land and logging rights. Damage to sites and ecosystems must be taxed.

Public funds should not be used to intensify forest management with roads and ditches. Environmental taxes for disposal of unsorted waste should be raised. Nature-conservation restrictions on private roads should be compensated equitably and efficiently. The party supports a nationally coordinated network of wildlife relief and rehabilitation centers. It recognises animal rights; treating animals as property contravenes the Animal Welfare Act. Animal-welfare organisations must have the right of appeal against animal abuse. The party supports animal-care requirements based on Animal Welfare Council recommendations for facilitating natural behaviour for the prevention of pain, illness and suffering. Fur farms should be prohibited, and the party opposes breeding which does not respect animal welfare.

The party supports alternative civilian service to clean up waste, plant forests and participate in other environmental initiatives. Large-scale projects with a negative environmental impact (such as Rail Baltica, large wood refineries based on outdated technology and new shale-oil processing plants) should be abandoned. A national rail network should be developed, with a fast rail connection to Riga. The party supports scientifically based fertilizers, innovative solutions for fertiliser dosing, environmentally friendly and grassland farming, and the cultivation and preservation of heirloom plant varieties and animal breeds.

=== Health and social protection ===
The Estonian Greens support health insurance for all citizens, and opportunities for senior citizens and other people with special needs to manage their time well. Loneliness in society as a whole must be systematically tackled. Efforts should be made to increase the birth rate, strengthen parental security and bring the generations closer together. The party supports home care and innovative nursing homes offering a dignified life, with community activities.

The labour market needs increased flexibility in working hours, part-time work, telecommuting, and jobs for people with special needs. The party favours a social tax on robots. It encourages the availability and production of local, organic foods in all child-care institutions to support local producers and promote a healthy diet and a sustainable environment. It supports a significant reduction in the production and consumption of meat and animal products, a more-accessible vegetarian diet and the modernisation of Estonia's dietary recommendations. Vegetarian foods should be provided in the public sector, including educational and health institutions.

The party supports the reform of alcohol and drug policies, with advertising for alcohol and tobacco prohibited. Excise taxes on alcohol in the Baltic states should be standardised and mind-altering substances (such as cannabis and indigenous entheogens) should be regulated, rather than prohibited.

=== Education ===
The party supports a flexible, values-oriented curriculum. The link between theoretical learning and everyday life should be strengthened by, for example, outdoor training. Education should be more creative and collective. Secondary schools should offer optional professional subjects and use the technical basis of vocational schools as much as possible. Lifelong learning should be supported, with environmental principles and respect for nature integrated into all curricula, levels of education, subjects and educational institutions. Teachers should be recruited, with support for specialisation and research. The preservation and expansion of Estonian language-learning opportunities should be supported in foreign schools if the Estonian community is sufficiently large.

Equal opportunities should exist at all levels of education, and primary and secondary schools should be decentralised. A student's school should be near their home. Local dialects and culture, based on cultural autonomy, should be taught. Every child should have the opportunity to participate, free of charge, in at least one recreational activity.

The party opposes the replacement of Estonian bachelor's-degree programs with English-language specialties. Teaching and research staffs should be certified separately. Working students should be able to study part-time free of charge. The interest rate on student loans should be lowered to the cost of living, and repayment terms extended. Part of the student loan should be forgiven at the birth of a child or the beginning of public-sector employment.

Each doctoral candidate should receive a stipend near the national average for the field relevant to their doctoral thesis. Free, credit-based higher education should replace the time-based curriculum to allow students to combine learning and work. Research should be funded at one per cent of GDP (three per cent after 10 years), with wasted resources eliminated.

Public authorities should be encouraged to outsource research and expert advice on issues of national importance, incorporating their findings into the decision-making process. The requirement to purchase research materials should be abolished; in most cases, the number of potential bidders is limited. Researchers should be supported for European research, cooperation with foreign research institutes and participation in research networks. The party supports free-enterprise research grants from taxation on the same basis as government stock exchanges and tax incentives for private investment in science. Tax breaks should be given to foreign research graduates conducting research (including postdoctoral research) during their early years in Estonia.

=== Europe and the world ===
The party prioritises the multilateral global order and pan-European cooperation. The central role of the United Nations as a platform for global agreements must be maintained, but the decision-making power of the permanent members of the Security Council must be reduced in favour of the General Assembly.

Estonia must contribute to and participate in the work of European Union institutions, protecting its interests and providing its point of view. The party aims to base EU economic policy on public interest and global justice, which must promote the efficient use of resources, energy efficiency and innovation. It supports reforming the EU's Common Agricultural Policy to ensure a more equitable, sustainable rural organisation. Only sustainable and environmentally-friendly businesses would receive agricultural subsidies. Environmental protection and health in the European Union must be more important than a free, borderless market economy. The party supports the right of the EU member states to protect their environment and their consumers.

The party questions the legislative powers of the European Commission (unlike the European Parliament). Members of the European Parliament and political groups must have the right to initiate projects, and Parliament should have the final decision-making power over EU laws of the European Union (the case with national parliaments).

Estonia and other European countries must contribute to development and humanitarian aid in conflict areas, minimising mass civilian migration. The party favours a better distribution of refugees based on national standards of living in the countries, cultural context, natural conditions and the wishes of the refugees, and will fight criminal organisations which benefit from illegal human transport. It encourages international migration for education and work, and supports international initiatives and agreements against tax havens and tax evasion. The party supports international financial stability, including the Tobin tax. It supports the rights of peaceful self-determination and cultural sovereignty, and opposes territorial, economic or other concessions to totalitarian states.

== Election results ==
=== Parliamentary elections ===
Election	Leader	Votes	%	Seats	+/−	Government
2007	Aleksei Lotman	39,279	7.14 (#5)	6 / 101	New	Opposition
2011	Aleksei Lotman	21,824	3.79 (#5)	0 / 101	▼6	Extra-parliamentary
2015	Aleksander Laane	5,193	0.90 (#7)	0 / 101	0	Extra-parliamentary
2019	Züleyxa Izmailova	10,227	1.82 (#7)	0 / 101	0	Extra-parliamentary
2023	Johanna Maria Tõugu	5,886	0.96 (#9)	0 / 101	0	Extra-parliamentary

=== European Parliament elections ===
Election	List leader	Votes	%	Seats	+/−	EP Group
2009	Unclear	10,851	2.73 (#5)	0 / 6	New	−
2014	Marko Kaasik	986	0.30 (#7)	0 / 6	0	−
2019	Evelin Ilves	5,824	1.75 (#7)	0 / 6	0	−
2024	Evelyn Sepp	2,246	0.61 (#9)	0 / 6	0	−

== See also ==
- Green party
- Green politics
- List of environmental organisations
