= Valdur Lahtvee =

Estonian politician (born 1958)

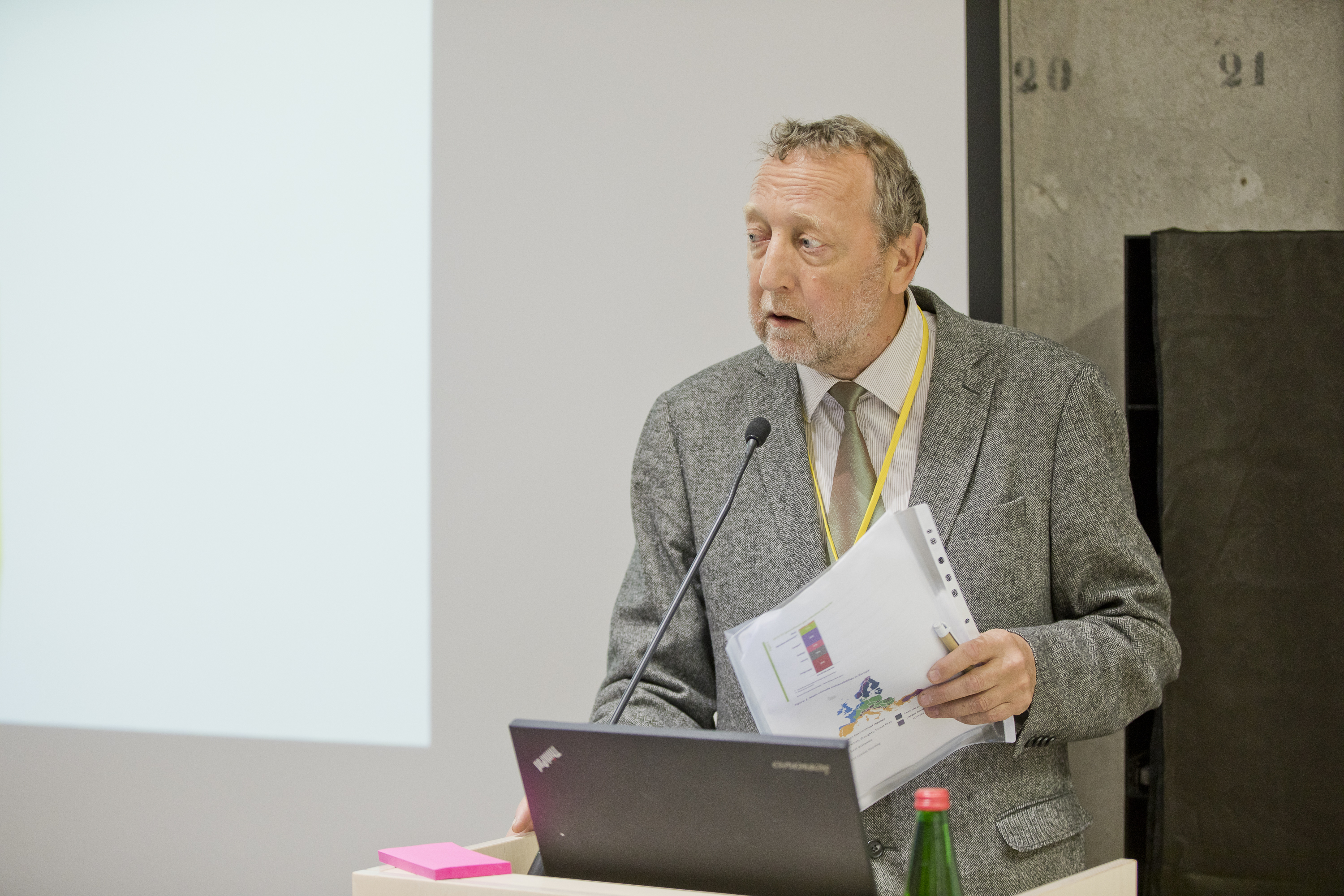
Valdur Lahtvee

Valdur Lahtvee (born 19 January 1958 in Antsla) is an Estonian politician. He has been member of XI Riigikogu.

He is a member of Estonian Greens.
