= Aadu Must =

Estonian historian and politician (1951–2023)

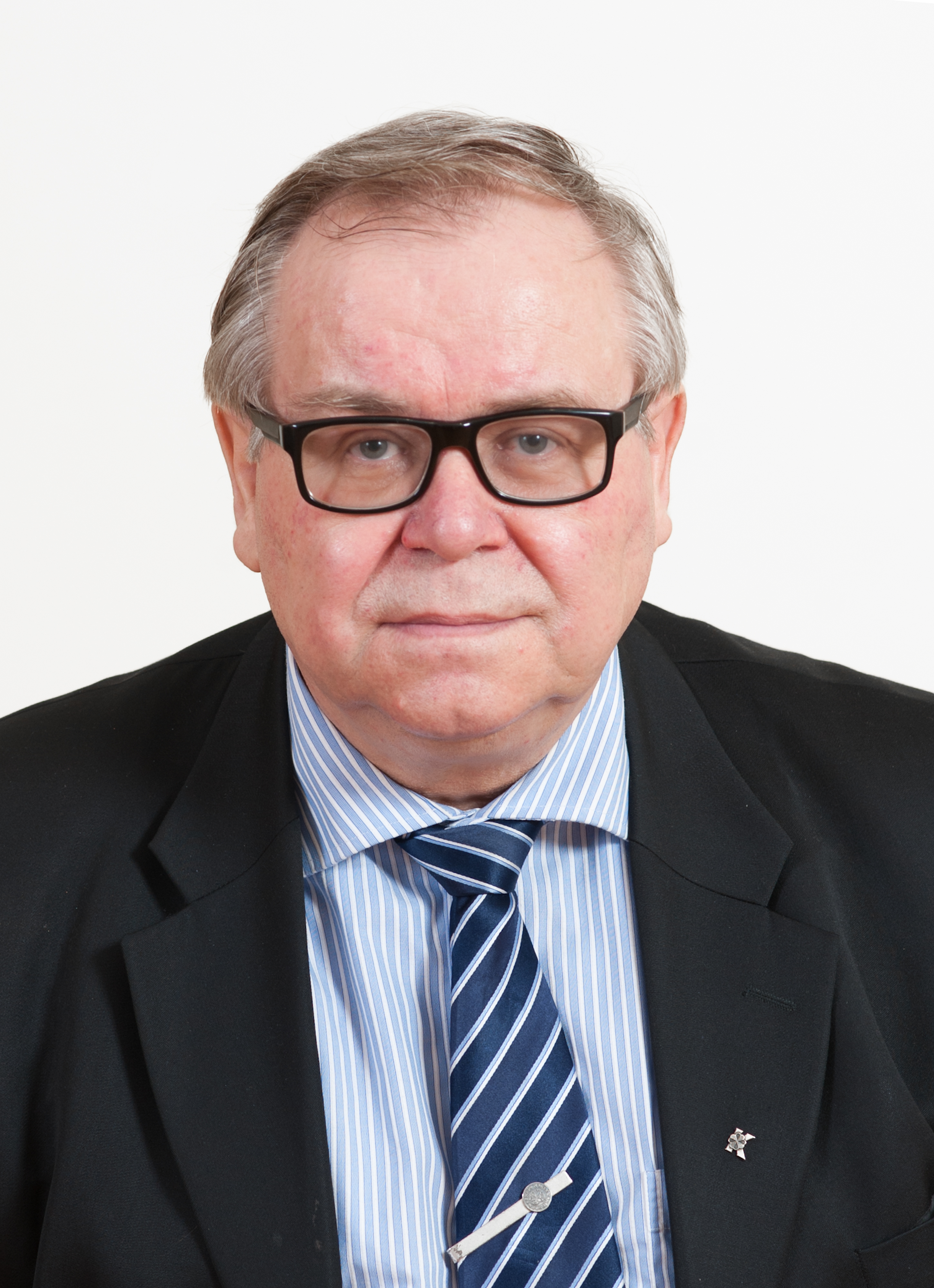
Must in 2015

Aadu Must (25 March 1951 – 20 July 2023) was an Estonian historian and politician. He was a member of the XI, XII, XIII and XIV Riigikogu.

== Life and career ==
Aadu Must was born in Pärnu on 25 March 1951. In 1985 he graduated from University of Tartu with a degree in history (PhD). From 1976 he was a lecturer (from 1997 professor) at Tartu University.

Must was a member of Committee of Estonia. He served as chairman of the Tartu City Council (intermittently between 2001–2020). From 1996 he was a member of the Estonian Centre Party.

Aadu Must died on 20 July 2023, at the age of 72.
