= Ruuben Kaalep =

Estonian politician, poet and ethnofuturist philosopher

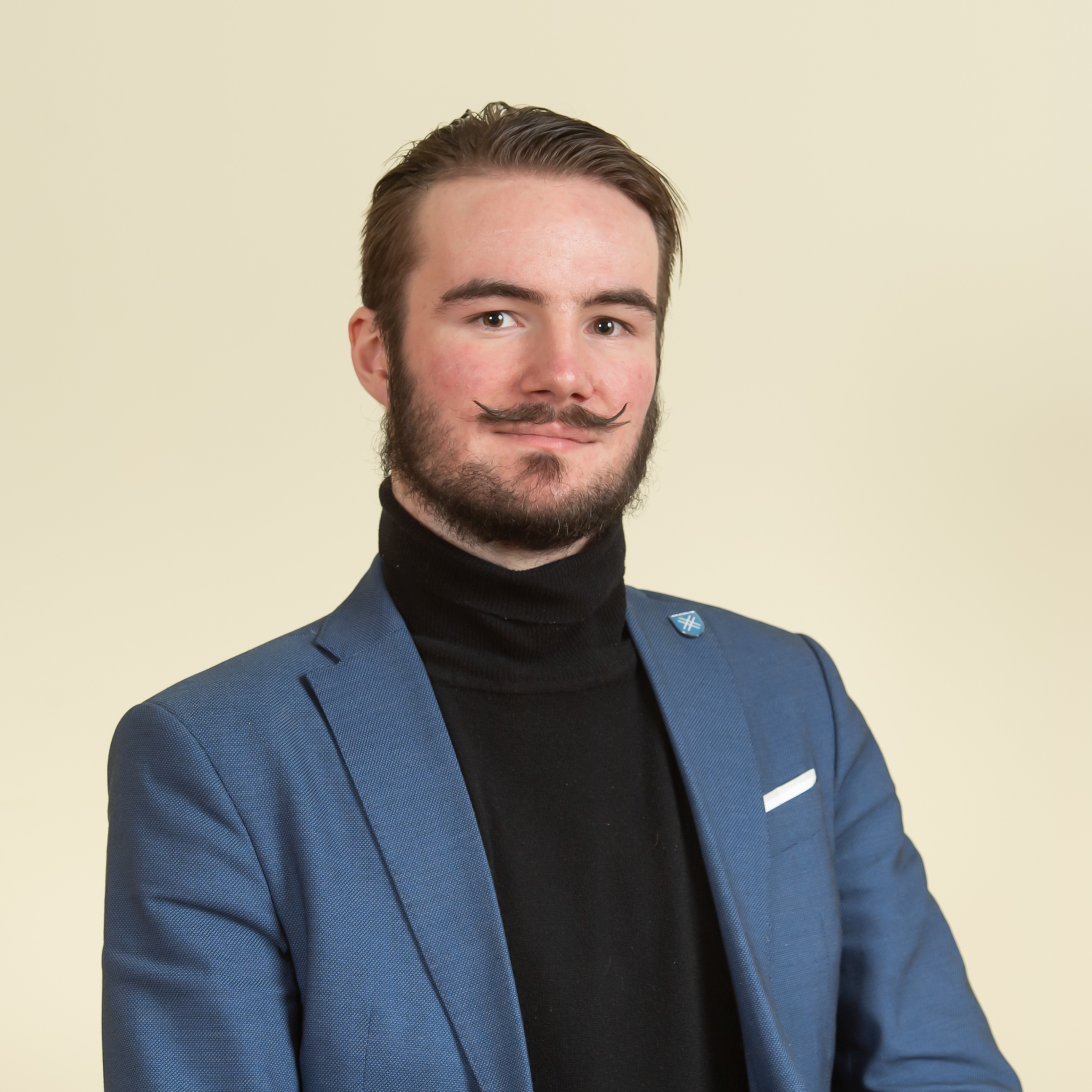
- Kaalep in 2019
- Born: 21 September 1993 (age 33); Tallinn, Estonia
- Political party: EKRE (until 2024); ERK (since 2024)

Ruuben Kaalep (born 21 September 1993) is a far-right Estonian politician and poet. He was a member of the XIV Riigikogu. He is a founder of the Conservative People's Party of Estonia's youth organization, Blue Awakening. In 2024, he was expelled from the party and is now a member of the Estonian Nationalists and Conservatives.

== Accusations of Nazism, anti-Semitism and right-wing extremism ==
In April 2019, journalist Mikk Salu published an article in Eesti Ekspress describing several anti-semitic incidents from Kaalep's past, alleging that he is a Nazi and an anti-Semite.

In high school, Kaalep allegedly directed a play questioning the Holocaust. Between 2009 and 2014, Kaalep was actively involved in the editing of the Estonian section of the anti-Semitic and Nazi online encyclopaedia Metapedia. In 2016, Kaalep posted a photo of himself with US far-right activist Paul Ray Ramsey on his Instagram page, captioning the photo "fashy goyim", which, according to journalist Mikk Salu, means "fascist non-Jews" in neo-Nazi parlance. Kaalep has commented on Salu's allegation: "This is an internet meme, and such an interpretation of the meme rather shows the journalist's incompetence."

In March, Kaalep shared a photo of himself and his companions standing behind Simon Wiesenthal Center director Efraim Zuroff, holding their noses and, in Mikk Salu's opinion, mocking the man. According to Kaalep, this disrespect was not directed at people of Jewish ethnicity, but at Efraim Zuroff alone, who "has for decades made statements that are hostile to Estonia and slanderous of our freedom struggle." In the same year, Kaalep also shared a photo on Twitter in which he poses with American neo-Nazi Richard B. Spencer. According to Kaalep, Spencer wanted to take a picture with him and he "disagrees with very many of his views, including the glorification of imperialism and Russophilia." In February 2019, Kaalep organised Greg Johnson and Olena Semenyaka to perform for the Young Relievers. Semenyaka was the foreign secretary of the Ukrainian parliamentary party, the National Corps and had represented Ukrainian nationalists at meetings and conferences in many European countries. The National Corps was based on the Azov Battalion, whose soldiers were also legally assisted by the Estonian state. Semenyaka was one of the most influential figures in the Ukrainian nationalist movement.

In May 2019, when Marine Le Pen was visiting Estonia for discussions with EKRE, MP Kaalep and Le Pen took a selfie together with both flashing the "OK" hand gesture.

Earlier, in 2015, Ruuben Kaalep's manifestations of far-right extremism had been discussed by historian Aro Velmet, who at the time pointed out that Kaalep had posed with the symbol of the War of Independence Victory Column on the EKRE website. Velmet saw in it the insignia of the Estonian volunteer division in the World War II.

== Poetry ==
In 2020, Kaalep published his first poetry book, Litoriinamere loits & teisi luuletusi. It includes poems written from his high school time up to his parliamentary work. Kaalep published simultaneously two versions of the book: one using the Latin alphabet, the other in runes. The runic version of his book is the first runic book published in Estonian language since the Middle Ages.

Kaalep's poetry is considered diverse: including doggerel, love poetry, nature meditations and ethnofuturism. According to Karl Martin Sinijärv, Kaalep is able to use his novel imagery and cool substance to create an entirely enjoyable poetic picture out of even old and supposedly boring metre. Rauno Alliksaar, however, has been critical of Kaalep's "dripping and sometimes thinly metaphored patriotism" and Aare Pilv of his "patriotic-militaristic eroticism". Siim Lill, on the other hand, describes Kaalep's poems as "sustained by a thorough self-irony", adding: "The author is aware of the addressees and impact of his words – that his texts irritate even beforehand, that nationalism automatically creates polemics. Thus, for the reader who supports Kaalep's position the texts are amusing, but for the reader who bounces off they become a grain of sand, scratching even when one understands that the words are consciously directed to irritate him."

Kaalep himself has described his poetic credo as follows: "Art is to express what cannot be expressed in words, while poetry is even more complicated, as it returns to express in words what cannot be expressed in words."

In 2022, Kaalep won a special prize at Otepää Parish Rhymed Chronicle awards for his poem "Hexameter of Päidla".

== Personal life ==
His father was poet, playwright, literary critic and translator Ain Kaalep. From 2012 until 2017 he studied history at the University of Tartu.

Kaalep is an adherent of the Estonian native faith.
