= Ando Kiviberg =

Estonian musician and politician

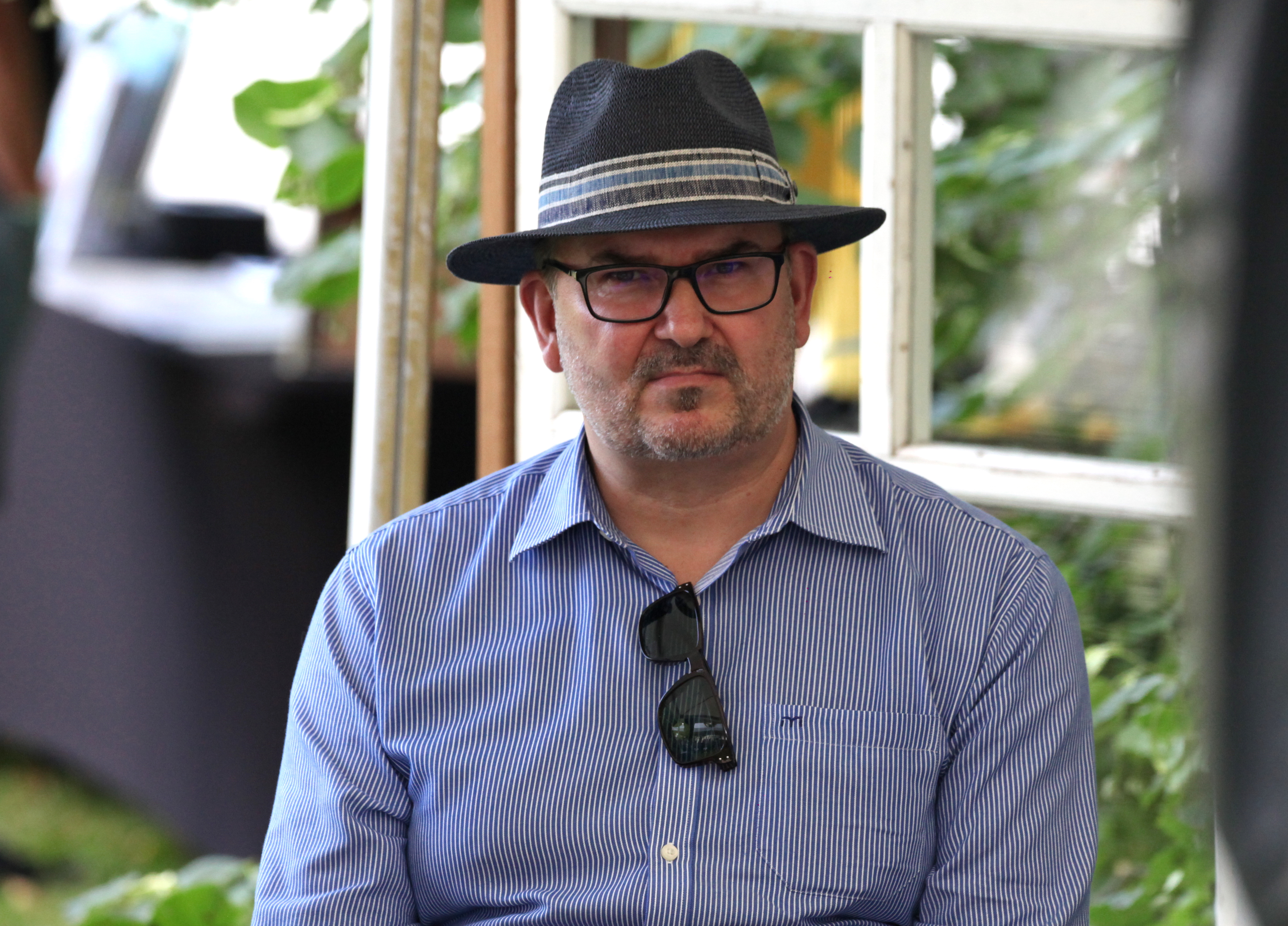
Ando Kiviberg at the Opinion Festival 2021 in Paide, Estonia

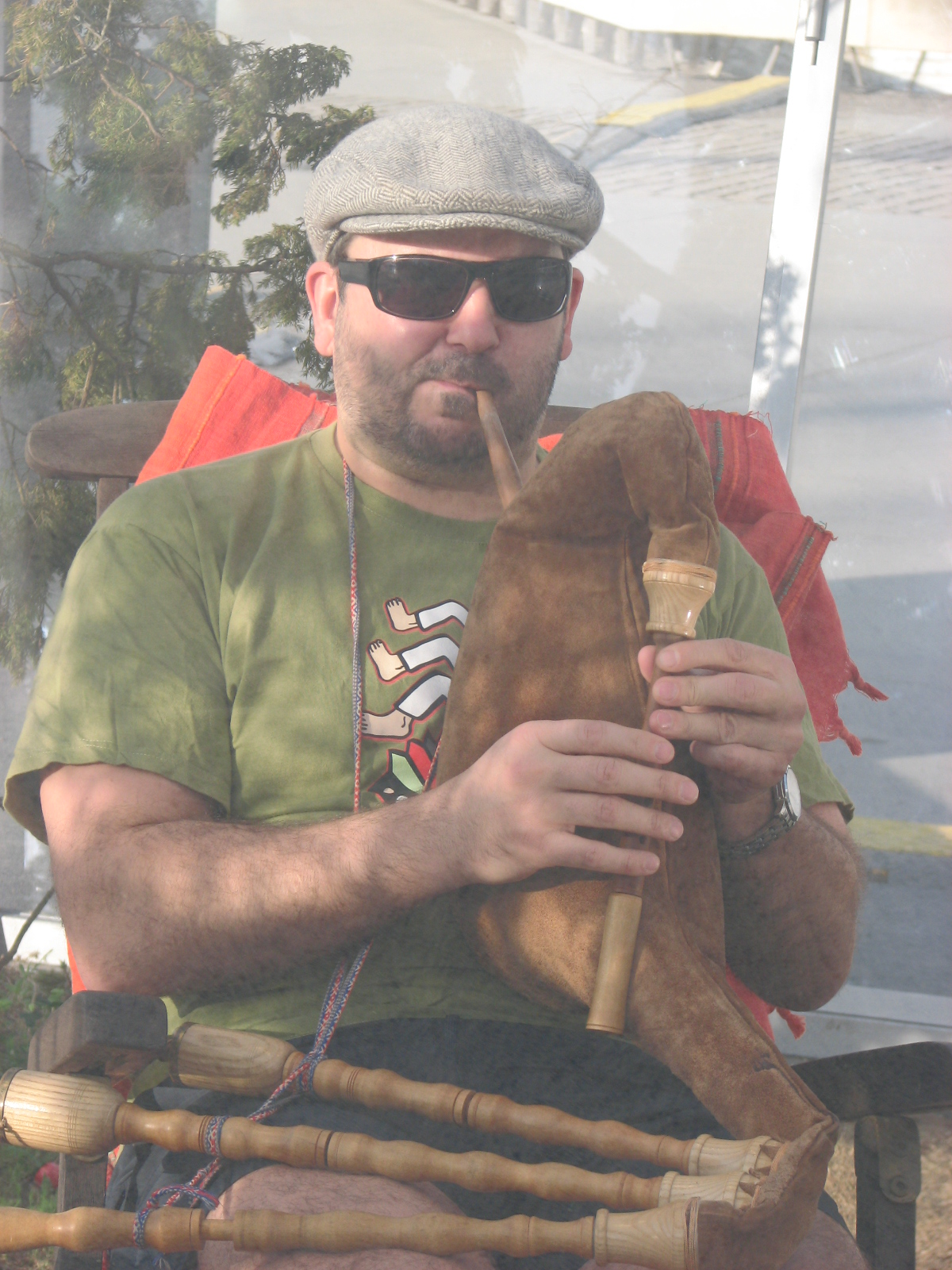
Ando Kiviberg (2011)

Ando Kiviberg (born 28 July 1969) is an Estonian folk musician and politician.

Since 1993 he has been the main organizer of Viljandi Folk Music Festival.

From 2013 to 2017, he was the mayor of Viljandi. He has been a member of the party Isamaa.

In 2001 he was awarded with Order of the White Star, V class.
