= Lääne Elu =

Estonian newspaper

Lääne Elu (lit. 'Western Life') is an Estonian language newspaper based in the city of Haapsalu, Estonia. The paper was started in 1989.
