= Rein Suurkask =

Estonian politician

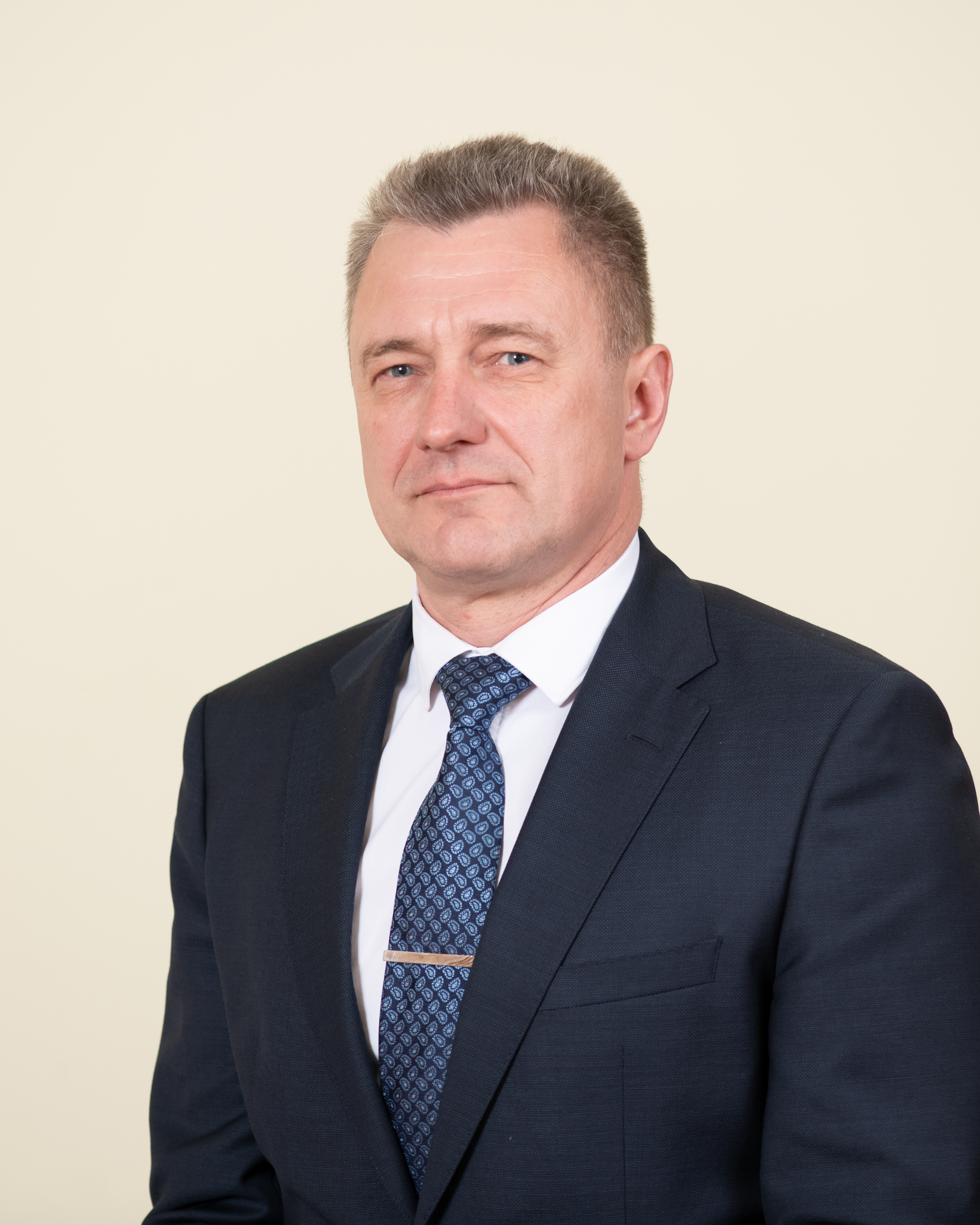
Suurkask in 2019.

Rein Suurkask (born 25 May 1968 in Mustvee) is an Estonian politician. He was a member of the XIV Riigikogu.

Since 2014 he has been a member of the Estonian Conservative People's Party.

Since 2017 he is a member of Viljandi City Council.
