= Johanna Maria Tõugu =

Estonian politician and environmentalist

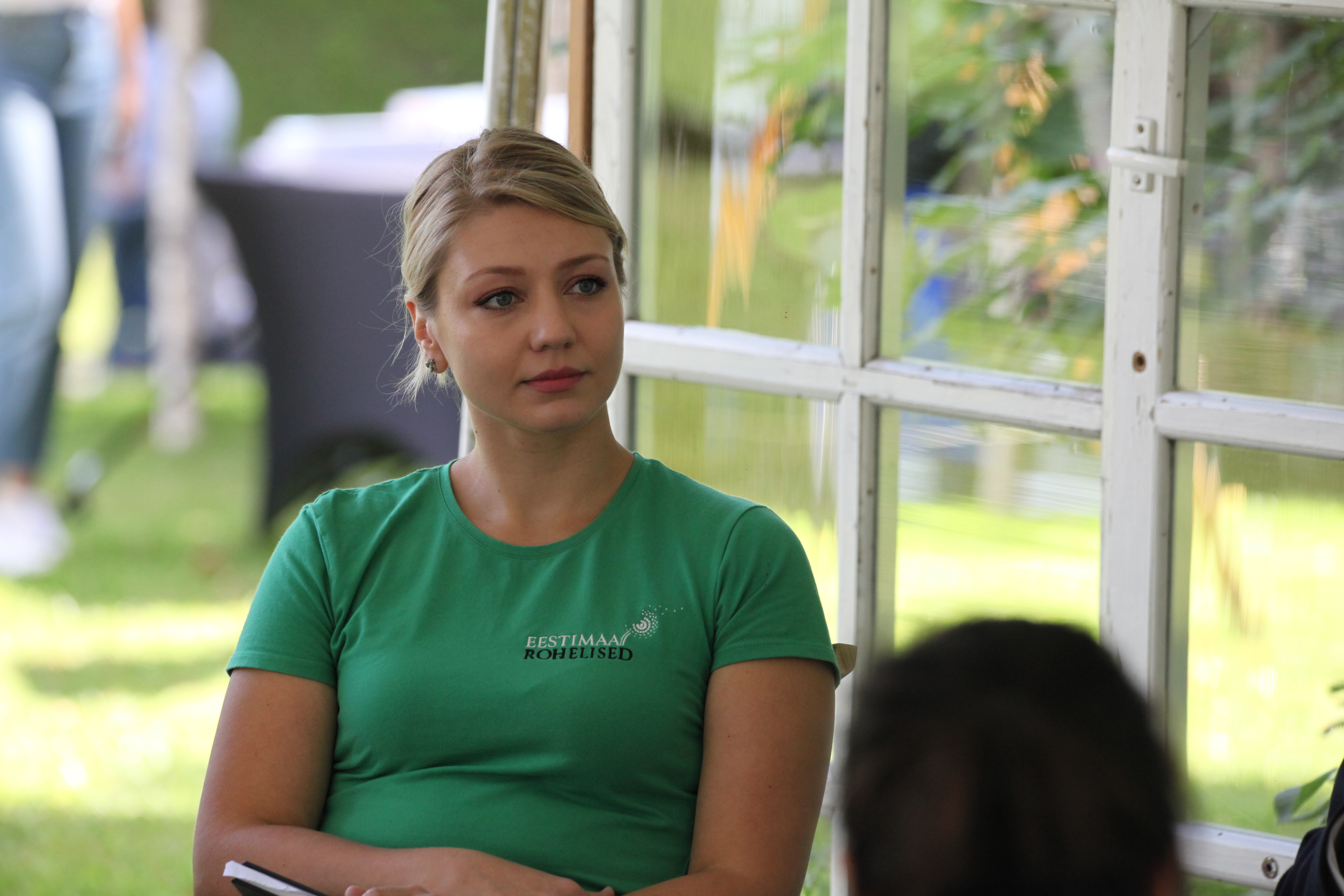
Tõugu in 2021

Johanna Maria Tõugu (born 3 September 1999 in Tallinn) is an Estonian environmentalist and politician who served as co-leader of the Estonian Greens from 2022 to 2023. She led her party unsuccessfully into the 2023 parliamentary election garnering 0.96% of the vote and failing to enter parliament.

In 2024, Tõugu announced that she would leave the Estonian Greens and join the Estonian Social Democratic Party.
