= Mihkel Pärnoja =

Estonian politician (born 1946)

Mihkel Pärnoja (born 3 January 1946 Vändra) is an Estonian chemist and politician. He was a member of VII Riigikogu.
