= Krista Aru =

Estonian historian, museologist and politician (1958–2025)

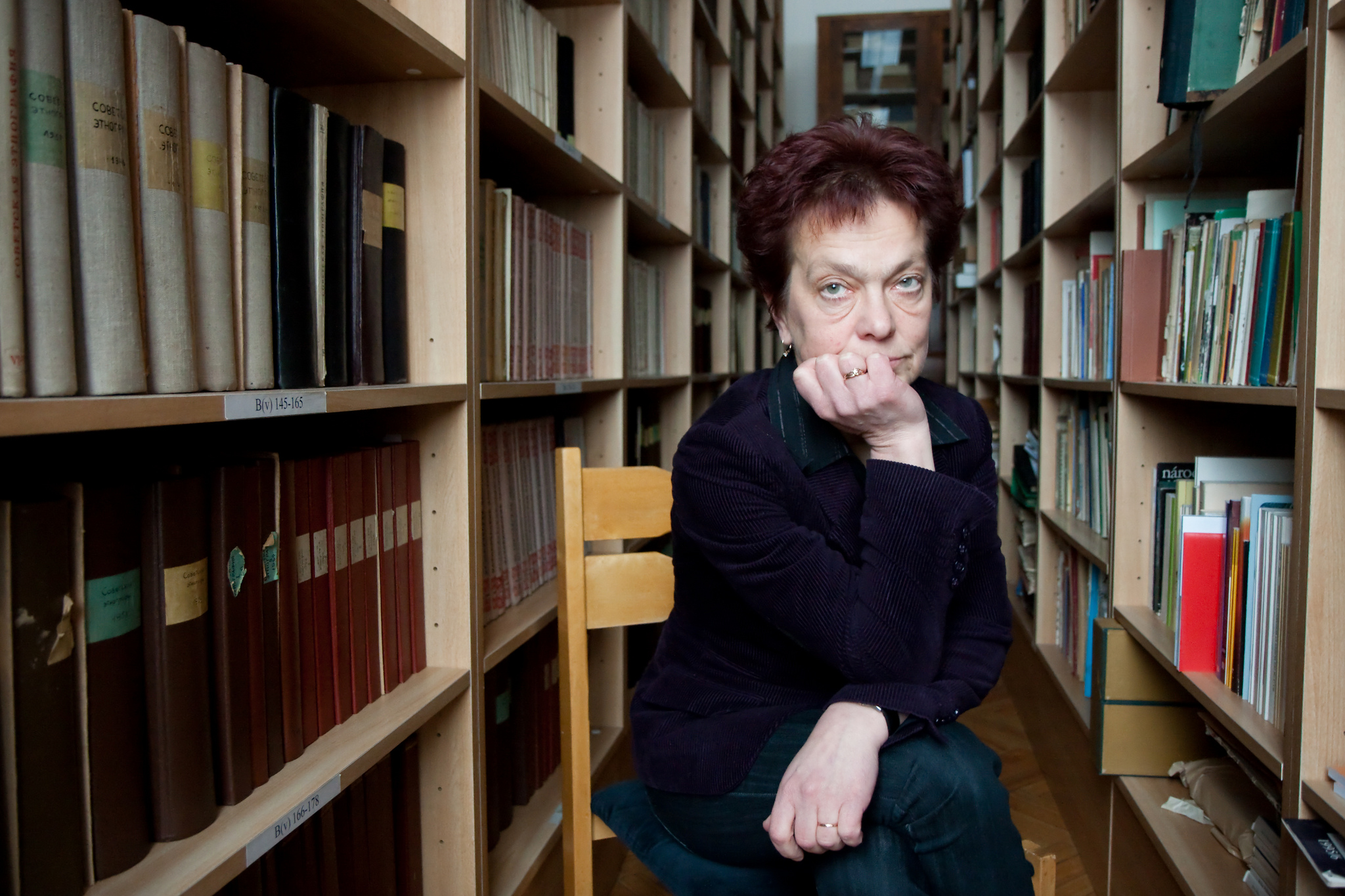
Krista Aru

Krista Aru (1 August 1958 – 25 February 2025) was an Estonian historian of journalism, museologist, and politician. She was a member of the XIII Riigikogu.

== Life and career ==
In 1981, she graduated from Tartu University in journalism. In 2010, she finished her doctoral studies at Tallinn University.

From 1995 to 2005 she was the director of the Estonian Literary Museum. From 2006 to 2012 she was the director of the Estonian National Museum.

She was an unaffiliated member of the Estonian Free Party.

Aru died on 25 February 2025, at the age of 66.

== Awards ==
- 2000: Order of the White Star, Class III
- 2005: Cultural Endowment of Estonia Annual Award
- 2012: Citizen of the Year
- 2018: Baltic Assembly Medal
