= Jaak Valge =

Estonian historian and politician

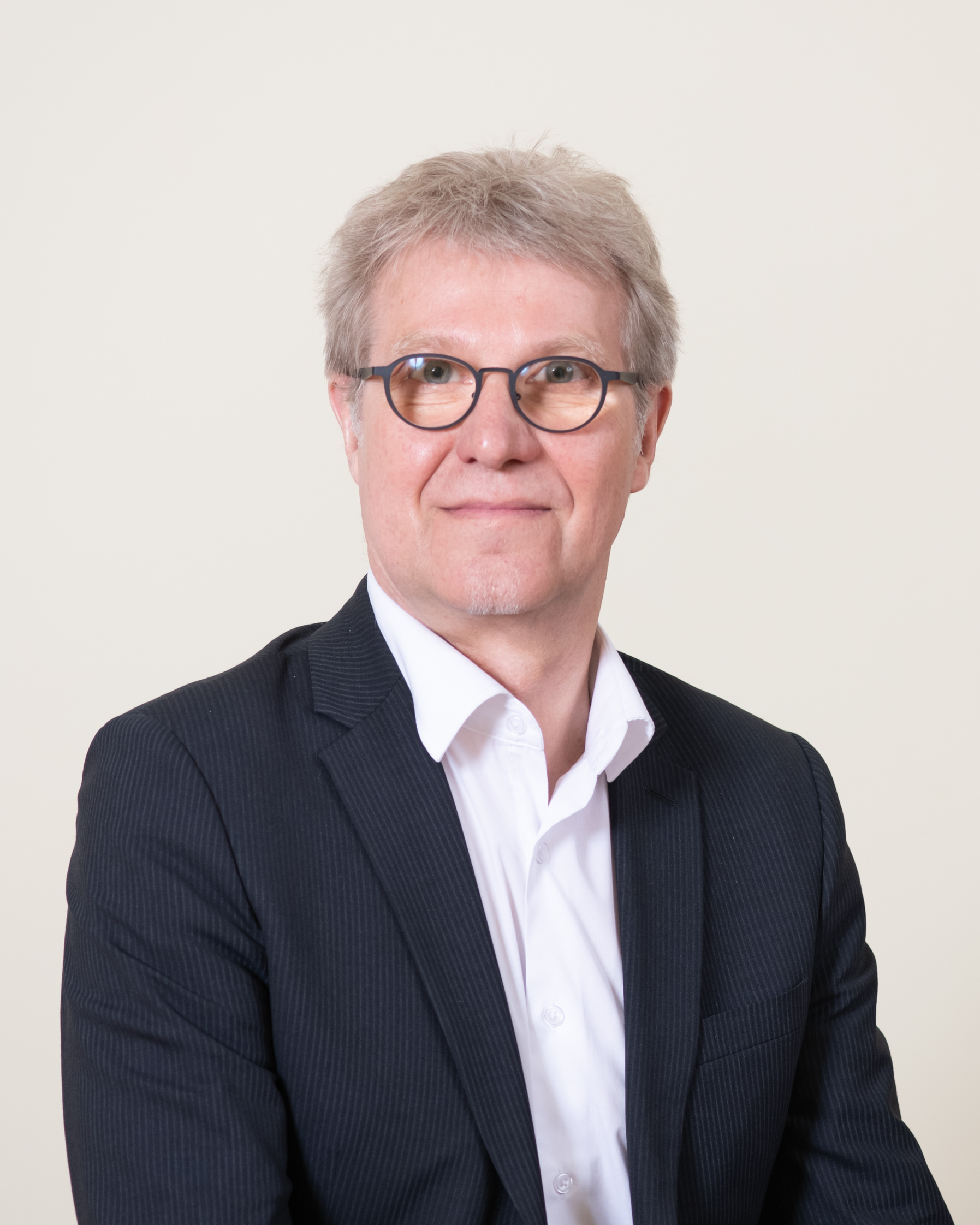

Member of XIV Riigikogu

Personal details
- Born: March 1, 1955 (age 71) Kiviõli, then part of Estonian SSR, Soviet Union
- Party: Estonian National Independence Party (1989–1993); Conservative People's Party of Estonia (2018-2024)
- Education: University of Tartu
- Occupation: Politician, historian

Jaak Valge (born 1 March 1955 in Kiviõli) is an Estonian historian and politician. He has been a member of the XIV Riigikogu.

In 1987 he graduated from the University of Tartu. Between 1995 and 2004 he was a lecturer at Tartu University.

He has published over 60 scientific articles and books.

From 1989 to 1993 he was a member of the Estonian National Independence Party. Between 2018 and 2024 he was a member of the Estonian Conservative People's Party and is currently taking part in the formation of the Estonian Nationalists and Conservatives.
