= Same-sex marriage in Estonia =

Same-sex marriage has been legal in Estonia since 1 January 2024. The government elected in the March 2023 election, led by Prime Minister Kaja Kallas and consisting of the Reform Party, the Social Democrats and Estonia 200, vowed to legalize same-sex marriage. Legislation to open marriage to same-sex couples was introduced to the Riigikogu in May 2023, and was approved in final reading by 55 votes to 34 on 20 June. It was signed into law by President Alar Karis on 27 June, and took effect on 1 January 2024. Estonia was the first Baltic state, the first post-Soviet state, the twentieth country in Europe, and the 35th in the world to legalise same-sex marriage. Polling suggests that a majority of Estonians support the legal recognition of same-sex marriage.

Registered partnerships, which provide some, but not all, of the rights, benefits and obligations of marriage, have been available to same-sex couples since 1 January 2016.

== Registered partnerships ==
=== Background ===
In December 2005, the launch of a new family law bill by the Ministry of Justice, explicitly defining marriage as a "union of a man and a woman", initiated a public debate on the issue of recognition of same-sex unions. The Ministry of Social Affairs, led by Minister Jaak Aab, expressed reservations about the draft law. The public debate attracted a significant response from LGBT rights groups, which opposed the family law bill and urged the government not to discriminate between same-sex and opposite-sex couples in marriage, stating that, "We call on the government to drop a clause in the draft law on the family, which does not allow the registration of same-sex marriages or partnerships". On 4 January 2006, five Estonian NGOs supporting LGBT rights issued a press release calling for a new partnership law to give same-sex couples equal rights to opposite-sex couples. On the other hand, a number of conservative politicians claimed that Estonia was "not yet ready" for same-sex marriage and that there was no need to create a separate law on same-sex unions since existing laws already implied some protection despite not mentioning same-sex unions explicitly. Väino Linde, the chairman of the Constitution Commission of the Riigikogu, stated that he was "glad to see the conservative views in the Parliament and in the [Constitution] Commission".

As of 2005, the Social Democratic Party was the only political party to publicly affirm its support for same-sex unions. The Centre Party and the Reform Party said that they would "tolerate" such a law, whereas various right-wing parties, particularly the Pro Patria and Res Publica Union, expressed opposition to the recognition of same-sex unions.

=== Registered Partnership Act ===
In July 2008, the Ministry of Justice, led by Minister Rein Lang, announced that it was drafting a registered partnership law for same-sex couples. The law, initially expected to come into force in 2009, was intended to provide a number of rights to same-sex couples, such as inheritance and shared property ownership. The law had the support of most parties in the Riigikogu. The Ministry of Justice studied proposals for the registration of unmarried couples, including same-sex couples. A comprehensive report was released in July 2009 examining three options: the recognition of unregistered cohabitation; the creation of a partnership registry; or the extension of marriage to same-sex couples. It left the decision over which model to implement to the Riigikogu and other "stakeholders". On 1 July 2010, a new family law was passed, defining marriage as between "a man and a woman" and declaring unions between members of the same sex "null and void". Prime Minister Andrus Ansip was quoted as saying, "I do not believe that Estonia, Latvia and Lithuania will soon accept same-sex marriage in the eyes of the law".

On 25 May 2011, Chancellor of Justice Indrek Teder requested that the Ministry of Justice introduce a civil partnership law, calling the non-recognition of same-sex relationships contrary to the Constitution of Estonia. Thereafter, partnership recognition again became an active political discussion in Estonia. The Reform Party and the Social Democratic Party supported introducing a partnership law, against the opposition of the conservative Pro Patria and Res Publica Union. The Centre Party supported a discussion on the issue. A bill was drafted in August 2012 by the Ministry of Justice, now led by Minister Kristen Michal, and was under public consultation until 1 October 2012. In March 2014, a parliamentary group began to examine the draft bill. The Registered Partnership Act (Estonian: Kooseluseadus) was submitted to Parliament on 17 April 2014. On 22 May, the government expressed its support, and on 19 June 2014 Parliament rejected a motion to kill the bill at first reading in a 32–45 vote. The second reading took place on 8 October, where a motion to hold a referendum on the bill was defeated in a 35–42 vote and another motion to kill it was defeated in a 33–41 vote. The bill passed its final vote on 9 October in a 40–38 vote. It was signed into law by President Toomas Hendrik Ilves the same day and took effect on 1 January 2016. During public debate on the bill, a number of public figures came out as gay, including choreographer Jüri Nael, actor Risto Kübar, fashion designer Aldo Järvsoo, and singer Lauri Liiv.

9 October 2014 vote in the Riigikogu
Party	Voted for	Voted against	Abstained	Absent (Did not vote)
G Estonian Reform Party	19: Arto Aas; Rein Aidma; Remo Holsmer; Jüri Jaanson; Kalle Jents; Kalev Kallemets; Tõnis Kõiv; Tiina Lokk-Tramberg; Lauri Luik; Rait Maruste; Kristen Michal; Meelis Mälberg; Kalle Palling; Mati Raidma; Laine Randjärv; Valdo Randpere; Paul-Eerik Rummo; Andre Sepp; Imre Sooäär	6: Peep Aru; Igor Gräzin; Tõnu Juul; Väino Linde; Tarmo Mänd; Aivar Sõerd	4: Aare Heinvee; Aivar Rosenberg; Jaanus Tamkivi; Terje Trei	4: Margus Hanson; Rein Lang; Tarmo Leinatamm; Kalev Lillo
Estonian Centre Party	6: Lembit Kaljuvee; Lauri Laasi; Kadri Simson; Olga Sõtnik; Priit Toobal; Rainer Vakra	13: Deniss Boroditš; Eldar Efendijev; Kalev Kallo; Valeri Korb; Mihhail Kõlvart; Kalle Laanet; Aivar Riisalu; Mihhail Stalnuhhin; Tarmo Tamm; Urbo Vaarmann; Viktor Vassiljev; Vladimir Velman; Peeter Võsa	2: Jüri Ratas; Marika Tuus-Laul	5: Enn Eesmaa; Siret Kotka; Heimar Lenk; Inara Luigas; Mailis Reps
Pro Patria and Res Publica Union	–	19: Jaak Aaviksoo; Annely Akkermann; Andres Herkel; Kaia Iva; Siim Valmar Kiisler; Aivar Kokk; Peeter Laurson; Liisa Pakosta; Tõnis Palts; Juhan Parts; Marko Pomerants; Urmas Reinsalu; Andrus Saare; Helir-Valdor Seeder; Sven Sester; Priit Sibul; Margus Tsahkna; Toomas Tõniste; Ken-Marti Vaher	1: Marko Mihkelson	3: Ene Ergma; Erki Nool; Reet Roos
G Social Democratic Party	15: Jaak Allik; Maimu Berg; Tatjana Jaanson; Etti Kagarov; Kalev Kotkas; Mart Meri; Marianne Mikko; Jüri Morozov; Eiki Nestor; Heljo Pikhof; Barbi Pilvre; Karel Rüütli; Indrek Saar; Neeme Suur; Rannar Vassiljev	–	3: Kalvi Kõva; Tiit Tammsaar; Jaan Õunapuu	1: Rein Randver
Total	40	38	10	13
Total	39.6%	37.6%	9.9%	12.9%

Registered partnerships (Estonian: kooseluleping, pronounced [ˈkoːselulepiŋk]) (Note: Russian: гражданское партнёрство, graždánskoje partnjórstvo; Võro: kokkoelämileping; Swedish: registrerat partnerskap) grant couples some, but not all, of the rights, benefits, obligations and responsibilities of marriage. Partners are required to financially support each other, are granted similar property rights to married spouses and have the right to adopt their partner's children (i.e. stepchild adoption). Partnerships performed in other countries are legally recognised in Estonia. In February 2017, the Tallinn Administrative Court ruled that the Ministry of the Interior had to register the stepchild adoption of a same-sex couple. The Ministry announced it would not appeal the decision. In January 2018, the Tartu Circuit Court ruled that a lesbian couple in a registered partnership could adopt, overturning a lower court ruling which had rejected the couple's adoption application.

=== Implementation acts ===
For several years after the passage of the bill, some implementing acts required for the law to enter into force were not passed by the Riigikogu. The conservative Pro Patria and Res Publica Union, which joined the Rõivas II Government after the March 2015 elections, argued that these acts should be passed in Parliament rather than by the cabinet, creating a dispute with the Reform Party and the Social Democrats. On 25 November 2015, Parliament rejected a motion to kill an implementing bill at first reading in a 41–42 vote. On 10 December, the chairman of the Legal Affairs Committee announced that the committee would not finish work on the bill and asked Parliament to begin the second reading before 17 December, before it adjourned on 11 January. This meant that the Registered Partnership Act would take effect without implementing measures, causing a number of legal loopholes and problems. Further readings were scheduled for the end of January 2016. In January 2017, the chairman of the Legal Affairs Committee of Parliament, Jaanus Karilaid, said that the implementing acts were unlikely to be adopted in the current term of Parliament, as passing these laws "would only result in new confrontations". At the same time, Karilaid suggested that Parliament did not have the numbers to repeal the underlying partnership law. Prime Minister Jüri Ratas echoed his suggestion, saying that the law would not be repealed by either the current nor the subsequent parliament. In September 2017, President Kersti Kaljulaid criticised the Parliament for failing to pass the implementing acts.

Because the Riigikogu did not adopt the implementation acts, same-sex couples in Estonia were in legal limbo, and increasingly turned to the courts in order to have their rights recognised. Numerous partnerships were performed in Estonia, but these unions were initially not entered into the population registry. A same-sex couple filed a legal complaint with the Tallinn Administrative Court in August 2016. In February 2017, the court ordered the government to pay monetary damages for failing to adopt the implementing acts. On 10 April 2018, the Supreme Court ruled that the law is in effect and should be enforced despite the lack of implementing measures.

On 17 January 2023, the Supreme Court upheld a lower court ruling requiring registered partnerships to be entered into the population register. On 27 January, Minister of the Interior Lauri Läänemets signed a circular allowing same-sex registered partners to share a common surname. On 8 April 2023, the government formed following the March 2023 parliamentary election promised to pass an implementing bill. (Note: Page 21 of the government programme: 11.23. Võtame vastu kooseluseaduse rakendusaktid. (translating to "11.23. We will adopt the implementing acts of the Registered Partnership Act.")) A bill implementing the partnership law passed its final reading in the Riigikogu on 20 June 2023. It was signed by President Alar Karis on 27 June, and took effect on 1 January 2024 alongside legislation opening marriage to same-sex couples. Registered partnerships remain in effect and available for both opposite-sex and same-sex couples.

=== Repeal efforts ===
In February 2016, several politicians—mostly from the Estonian Free Party—introduced the Same-Sex Partnership Bill to the Riigikogu, aimed at repealing the Registered Partnership Act and creating a separate law for same-sex couples. Andres Herkel, spokesman for the Free Party, justified the need for the bill and criticised the partnership act, arguing it had "brought legal confusion to include same-sex couples and opposite-sex couples in the same law", "The including of the regulation concerning different-sex couples and same-sex couples in one Act is the basis of very many conceptual confusion." The bill was opposed by the Conservative People's Party, the Reform Party and the Social Democrats, and ultimately failed 14–55 in Parliament.

In October 2017, the Riigikogu voted against a bill seeking to repeal the Registered Partnership Act. The repeal bill, the Bill to Repeal the Registered Partnership Act (Estonian: Kooseluseaduse kehtetuks tunnistamise seaduse eelnõu), supported by the Conservative People's Party and the Pro Patria and Res Publica Union, was rejected by a vote of 19–47 at first reading on 17 October. The Social Democrats, the Reform Party and the two independents opposed the bill, arguing it would "take rights away". The Centre Party was split, with some voting against the bill and others abstaining, whilst the Free Party mostly abstained. Lawmakers supporting the bill claimed that the Registered Partnership Act had "brought division within Estonian society".

17 October 2017 vote in the Riigikogu
Party	Voted for	Voted against	Abstained	Absent (Did not vote)
Estonian Reform Party	1: Igor Gräzin	21: Arto Aas; Remo Holsmer; Jüri Jaanson; Liina Kersna; Eerik-Niiles Kross; Urmas Kruuse; Ants Laaneots; Maris Lauri; Jürgen Ligi; Lauri Luik; Kristen Michal; Madis Milling; Meelis Mälberg; Keit Pentus-Rosimannus; Hanno Pevkur; Heidy Purga; Laine Randjärv; Valdo Randpere; Anne Sulling; Urve Tiidus; Terje Trei	4: Deniss Boroditš; Toomas Kivimägi; Kalle Laanet; Aivar Sõerd	4: Yoko Alender; Johannes Kert; Kalle Palling; Taavi Rõivas
G Estonian Centre Party	–	7: Enn Eesmaa; Oudekki Loone; Anneli Ott; Kersti Sarapuu; Mihhail Stalnuhhin; Tiit Terik; Toomas Vitsut	9: Helmut Hallemaa; Olga Ivanova; Valeri Korb; Mihhail Korb; Heimar Lenk; Märt Sults; Marika Tuus-Laul; Viktor Vassiljev; Vladimir Velman	11: Dmitri Dmitrijev; Peeter Ernits; Jaanus Karilaid; Siret Kotka-Repinski; Igor Kravtšenko; Aadu Must; Andrei Novikov; Toomas Paur; Martin Repinski; Erki Savisaar; Toomas Väinaste
G Social Democratic Party	–	15: Hannes Hanso; Toomas Jürgenstein; Kalvi Kõva; Helmen Kütt; Inara Luigas; Jaanus Marrandi; Marianne Mikko; Eiki Nestor; Liisa Oviir; Ivari Padar; Heljo Pikhof; Barbi Pilvre; Tanel Talve; Rainer Vakra; Hardi Volmer	–	–
G Pro Patria and Res Publica Union	10: Raivo Aeg; Tiina Kangro; Aivar Kokk; Tarmo Kruusimäe; Viktoria Ladõnskaja; Andres Metsoja; Marko Pomerants; Helir-Valdor Seeder; Sven Sester; Priit Sibul	1: Maire Aunaste	1: Mart Nutt	–
Estonian Free Party	1: Jüri Adams	1: Ain Lutsepp	6: Andres Ammas; Krista Aru; Monika Haukanõmm; Andres Herkel; Külliki Kübarsepp; Artur Talvik	–
Conservative People's Party	7: Martin Helme; Mart Helme; Uno Kaskpeit; Jaak Madison; Raivo Põldaru; Henn Põlluaas; Arno Sild	–	–	–
Independent	–	2: Marko Mihkelson (Note: Both MPs were formerly members of the Pro Patria and Res Publica Union.); Margus Tsahkna	–	–
Total	19	47	20	15
Total	18.8%	46.5%	19.8%	14.9%

=== Statistics ===
29 same-sex partnerships had been performed by August 2016. By October 2017, 59 cohabitation agreements had been concluded.

== Immigration and residency rights ==
In June 2017, the Estonian Supreme Court ruled that same-sex couples have a right to the protection of their family life. Clarifying the courts' jurisdiction in the matter of applying legal protection in residence permit disputes, the court ruled that Estonian law does not forbid issuing residence permits to same-sex spouses. However, in November 2017 the Tallinn Circuit Court ruled that an American woman in a same-sex relationship with an Estonian woman could not be issued a residence permit. The couple appealed to the Supreme Court, which dismissed their case in April 2018. The couple entered into a registered partnership, as the Supreme Court had ruled that same month that the partnership law was in effect. This enabled the American partner to reside in Estonia. Following the ruling of the European Court of Justice in June 2018 in Coman and Others v General Inspectorate for Immigration and Ministry of the Interior, relating to the rights of same-sex couples in the European Union, an Estonian court ruled that same-sex couples must be treated the same way as opposite-sex couples in the issuance of residence permits.

On 21 June 2019, the Supreme Court ruled in two cases that refusing to grant residence permits to the foreign same-sex partners of Estonian citizens was unconstitutional. The court ruled that the provision preventing the granting of temporary residence permits to same-sex partners was unconstitutional and invalid under the Aliens Act (Estonian: Välismaalaste seadus). In accordance with the principles of human dignity and equal treatment guaranteed by the Constitution of Estonia, the Supreme Court found that family law also protects the right of people of the same sex to live in Estonia as a family.

== Same-sex marriage ==
Laws regarding same-sex partnerships in Europe¹ Marriage Civil union Limited domestic recognition (cohabitation) Unrecognized Constitution limits marriage to opposite-sex couples ¹ May include recent laws or court decisions that have not yet entered into effect.

=== Background ===
A same-sex marriage was recognised by a court in December 2016. The couple, two men who had originally married in Sweden but now lived in Estonia, had their marriage officially registered in late January 2017. Initially, a court in Harju County had refused to register their marriage, but the couple appealed the decision. In December, the Tallinn Circuit Court ruled that the marriage must be entered into the Estonian population registry. Much uncertainty followed the ruling, concerning whether the ruling applied universally to all couples or only to this specific case. According to several Estonian jurists and lawyers, whether a same-sex marriage would be recognized had to be assessed on a case-by-case basis. Others argued that the Private International Law Act (Estonian: Rahvusvahelise eraõiguse seadus), the law which applies when the validity of foreign marriages needs to be assessed, did not explicitly prohibit the recognition of same-sex marriages. In March 2017, Martin Helme of the Conservative People's Party, speaking in the Riigikogu, threatened the judges who issued the ruling, saying he wanted their "heads to roll". Many criticised his comments, including President Kersti Kaljulaid, Chief Justice Priit Pikamäe and Speaker of Parliament Eiki Nestor.

In November 2017, Archbishop Urmas Viilma of the Estonian Evangelical Lutheran Church argued that the Estonian Constitution should define marriage as between "a man and a woman". This proposal was supported by the 2019 election platforms of both the Conservative People's Party, and Isamaa. Speaker Eiki Nestor rejected the call, saying "that not even the Bible made such a specification, and neither should the Constitution".

In December 2021, the Ministry of the Interior confirmed that transgender people can change their legal gender while remaining married to their spouse. Estonian law permits the Ministry to petition to annul marriages under a "public interest" defense. A spokesman for the Ministry said, "during the last five or six years, significant changes have taken place in society, as a result of which it can no longer be said that the marriage of a same-sex couple is contrary to Estonian public order."

=== Attempts to pass constitutional ban ===
Following the 2019 elections, the Centre Party entered into a coalition government with the Conservative People's Party and Isamaa. The People's Party made a referendum on same-sex marriage a condition for joining the government. Eventually, the coalition agreement between the three parties included the pledge of conducting a referendum on same-sex marriage. The referendum would have asked voters whether the Estonian Constitution should define marriage as the "union of a man and a woman". Initially, the referendum was supposed to be binding and directly amend the Constitution if approved by voters; however, after several months of controversy and debate, the government decided that the referendum would be non-binding and would gauge public opinion on the issue. The government agreed to hold the referendum in spring 2021. The referendum proposal was widely criticized by the Reform Party and the Social Democrats. Opponents argued that the measure was "divisive", "confusing", and "unnecessary". In November 2020, Prime Minister Jüri Ratas announced that the wording of the referendum would likely be: "Should marriage in Estonia remain as a union between one man and one woman?" Ratas made assurances that the referendum would take place in spring 2021, though an exact date had not yet been agreed on. Further controversy arose when the Election Committee announced it would not be possible to hold the referendum in spring if the government wanted to use a new electronic voter list, in line with recently passed legislation.

In response to the referendum proposal, the extra-parliamentary Estonian Greens launched a petition in October 2020 on the government website rahvaalgatus.ee calling for the legalisation of same-sex marriage. The portal allows citizens to present various petitions, with petitions receiving more than 1,000 signatures referred to the Riigikogu for consideration. The marriage petition by the Greens was signed by 35,805 people by its deadline, becoming the most signed petition in the portal's history and surpassing the previously most signed petition which had received 7,000 signatures. The Social Democratic Party formally announced its support for same-sex marriage on 1 November 2020, becoming the first mainstream political party in Estonia to do so. Estonia 200 also supports same-sex marriage.

A draft bill to hold the marriage referendum on 18 April 2021 passed its first reading on 14 December 2020. A motion to kill the bill failed by a vote of 48–51, with the Reform Party, the Social Democrats and some Isamaa MPs opposing. Leader of the Reform Party Kaja Kallas argued that the planned referendum was "pointless, ridiculous and cruel", adding, "Generally, we have nothing against referenda. The opinion of the people can be sought in matters of national importance; however, what is being offered to us now is not an issue of national importance." Kallas argued that the funds needed for the referendum would be better used in matters relating to the COVID-19 pandemic. Before the bill's second reading, the Social Democrats and Reform Party introduced some 9,370 amendments to the proposed bill, with the aim of paralyzing the work of the Parliament and causing the bill to be shelved. Many of the amendments were of a humorous nature, such as: "Should men be banned from having hair transplants in the Republic of Estonia?" or "Should friendship be banned in Estonia?" This prompted the Constitutional Affairs Committee chair, Anti Poolamets, to limit MPs' floor time to a few minutes. The bill's second reading was scheduled for 13 January 2021. However, on that same day, Ratas resigned as prime minister after his Centre Party was suspected of "criminal involvement" in an influence peddling scandal, causing the fall of the government. Following the fall of the government, Centre MP Andrei Korobeinik proposed to withdraw the bill. Poolamets nevertheless decided to put it to a vote, and the bill was defeated by a vote of 26–49. On 26 January 2021, Kallas became prime minister and a new government of the Reform and Centre parties was sworn in.

13 January 2021 vote in the Riigikogu
Party	Voted for	Voted against	Abstained	Absent (Did not vote)
Estonian Reform Party	–	34: Annely Akkermann; Yoko Alender; Hele Everaus; Jüri Jaanson; Kaja Kallas; Siim Kallas; Erkki Keldo; Liina Kersna; Johannes Kert; Signe Kivi; Toomas Kivimägi; Heiki Kranich; Eerik-Niiles Kross; Urmas Kruuse; Ants Laaneots; Kalle Laanet; Maris Lauri; Jürgen Ligi; Kristen Michal; Marko Mihkelson; Madis Milling; Keit Pentus-Rosimannus; Hanno Pevkur; Heidy Purga; Valdo Randpere; Signe Riisalo; Andrus Seeme; Andres Sutt; Aivar Sõerd; Urve Tiidus; Vilja Toomast; Marko Torm; Mart Võrklaev; Kristina Šmigun-Vähi	–	–
G Estonian Centre Party	–	1: Imre Sooäär	23: Dmitri Dmitrijev; Enn Eesmaa; Kaido Höövelson; Maria Jufereva-Skuratovski; Marek Jürgenson; Jaanus Karilaid; Andrei Korobeinik; Siret Kotka; Igor Kravtšenko; Oudekki Loone; Natalia Malleus; Aadu Must; Tõnis Mölder; Peeter Rahnel; Martin Repinski; Mailis Reps; Kersti Sarapuu; Erki Savisaar; Mihhail Stalnuhhin; Tarmo Tamm; Marika Tuus-Laul; Viktor Vassiljev; Marko Šorin	1: Mihhail Korb
G Conservative People's Party	19: Merry Aart; Riho Breivel; Peeter Ernits; Urmas Espenberg; Kalle Grünthal; Helle-Moonika Helme; Mart Helme; Ruuben Kaalep; Uno Kaskpeit; Kert Kingo; Rene Kokk; Leo Kunnas; Siim Pohlak; Anti Poolamets; Paul Puustusmaa; Henn Põlluaas; Urmas Reitelmann; Kai Rimmel; Jaak Valge	–	–	–
G Isamaa	7: Heiki Hepner; Aivar Kokk; Tarmo Kruusimäe; Andres Metsoja; Helir-Valdor Seeder; Sven Sester; Priit Sibul	3: Siim Kiisler; Viktoria Ladõnskaja-Kubits; Üllar Saaremäe	2: Mihhail Lotman; Raivo E. Tamm	–
Social Democratic Party	–	10: Jaak Juske; Kalvi Kõva; Helmen Kütt; Lauri Läänemets; Eduard Odinets; Jevgeni Ossinovski; Ivari Padar; Heljo Pikhof; Indrek Saar; Riina Sikkut	–	–
Independent	–	1: Raimond Kaljulaid (Note: Originally a member of the Estonian Centre Party, Raimond Kaljulaid left the party in April 2019 over the decision to include the Conservative People's Party in the government coalition. On 7 November 2019, Kaljulaid announced his decision to join the Social Democratic Party (SDE), although by law, he could not officially join the SDE parliamentary group.)	–	–
Total	26	49	25	1
Total	25.7%	48.5%	24.8%	1.0%

=== Changes to the Family Law Act ===
On 8 April 2023, the incoming government of the Reform Party, Estonia 200 and the Social Democratic Party, formed following the March 2023 election, promised to legalize same-sex marriage by changing the Family Law Act (Estonian: Perekonnaseadus) to define marriage as between "two adults". (Note: Page 21 of the government programme: 11.22. Muudame perekonnaseadust selliselt, et abielu sõlmitakse kahe täiskasvanud inimese vahel. (translating to "11.22. We will change the Family Law Act in such a way that marriage is concluded between two adults.")) Prime Minister Kaja Kallas said the government would legislate for marriage equality "as fast as possible". Minister of Social Protection Signe Riisalo said on 19 April that she hoped a draft same-sex marriage bill would be discussed by the Riigikogu before the summer legislative break. The government approved a draft bill in May 2023 and sent it to the Riigikogu on 15 May. The bill would also guarantee same-sex couples full adoption rights and implement the registered partnership law. It was approved at first reading on 22 May, with a motion to kill the bill failing 27–53. That same day, a petition in support of same-sex marriage signed by 600 prominent Estonians, including former presidents Toomas Hendrik Ilves and Kersti Kaljulaid, writer Aino Pervik, film director Mart Kivastik, actor Mait Malmsten, and actress Karin Rask, was presented to the Riigikogu.

22 May 2023 vote in the Riigikogu
Party	Voted for	Voted against	Abstained	Absent (Did not vote)
G Estonian Reform Party	–	31: Annely Akkermann; Yoko Alender; Anti Haugas; Karmen Joller; Mario Kadastik; Erkki Keldo; Liina Kersna; Signe Kivi; Toomas Kivimägi; Mait Klaassen; Eerik-Niiles Kross; Urmas Kruuse; Katrin Kuusemäe; Ants Laaneots; Hanah Lahe; Maris Lauri; Jürgen Ligi; Eero Merilind; Marko Mihkelson; Pärtel-Peeter Pere; Õnne Pillak; Mati Raidma; Valdo Randpere; Luisa Rõivas; Pipi-Liis Siemann; Timo Suslov; Andres Sutt; Urve Tiidus; Vilja Toomast; Kristo Enn Vaga; Kristina Šmigun-Vähi	4: Siim Kallas; Meelis Kiili; Andrus Seeme; Aivar Sõerd	2: Maido Ruusmann; Margit Sutrop
Conservative People's Party	16: Arvo Aller; Rain Epler; Ants Frosch; Kalle Grünthal; Martin Helme; Helle-Moonika Helme; Mart Helme; Kert Kingo; Leo Kunnas; Alar Laneman; Siim Pohlak; Anti Poolamets; Evelin Poolamets; Henn Põlluaas; Jaak Valge; Varro Vooglaid	–	–	1: Rene Kokk
Estonian Centre Party	6: Vadim Belobrovtsev; Aleksei Jevgrafov; Maria Jufereva-Skuratovski; Anastassia Kovalenko-Kõlvart; Lauri Laats; Aleksandr Tšaplõgin	–	7: Jaak Aab; Enn Eesmaa; Andre Hanimägi; Tanel Kiik; Tõnis Mölder; Jüri Ratas; Kersti Sarapuu	3: Jaanus Karilaid; Ester Karuse; Andrei Korobeinik
G Estonia 200	–	14: Lauri Hussar; Züleyxa Izmailova; Irja Lutsar; Liisa-Ly Pakosta; Juku-Kalle Raid; Marek Reinaas; Kalev Stoicescu; Kadri Tali; Peeter Tali; Tarmo Tamm; Igor Taro; Tanel Tein; Hendrik Johannes Terras; Toomas Uibo	–	–
G Social Democratic Party	–	8: Anti Allas; Helmen Kütt; Priit Lomp; Tiit Maran; Eduard Odinets; Jevgeni Ossinovski; Heljo Pikhof; Reili Rand	–	1: Raimond Kaljulaid
Isamaa	5: Tõnis Lukas; Mart Maastik; Urmas Reinsalu; Priit Sibul; Riina Solman	–	1: Andres Metsoja	2: Aivar Kokk; Helir-Valdor Seeder
Total	27	53	12	9
Total	26.7%	52.5%	11.9%	8.9%

The legislation was approved in its final reading on 20 June by 55 votes to 34. It was signed into law by President Alar Karis on 27 June, and took effect on 1 January 2024. Following the vote, Riisalo said, "Guaranteeing equal rights for all is such an elementary thing that this issue was essentially covered in the discussions that took place in the years immediately after we regained our independence. I am delighted that the decision has now been taken for a more forward-looking Estonia that cares for all." Article 1 of the Family Law Act was amended to read: Marriage is concluded between two natural persons. (Note: Estonian: Abielu sõlmitakse kahe füüsilise isiku vahel.) As Estonia requires a one-month waiting period between the initial application for a marriage license and the time the marriage becomes official, the first same-sex marriages were performed on 2 February.

20 June 2023 vote in the Riigikogu
Party	Voted for	Voted against	Abstained	Absent (Did not vote)
G Estonian Reform Party	32: Annely Akkermann; Yoko Alender; Anti Haugas; Mario Kadastik; Siim Kallas; Erkki Keldo; Liina Kersna; Signe Kivi; Toomas Kivimägi; Mait Klaassen; Eerik-Niiles Kross; Urmas Kruuse; Katrin Kuusemäe; Ants Laaneots; Hanah Lahe; Maris Lauri; Eero Merilind; Marko Mihkelson; Pärtel-Peeter Pere; Õnne Pillak; Mati Raidma; Valdo Randpere; Maido Ruusmann; Luisa Rõivas; Andrus Seeme; Pipi-Liis Siemann; Timo Suslov; Margit Sutrop; Andres Sutt; Urve Tiidus; Kristo Enn Vaga; Kristina Šmigun-Vähi	–	1: Aivar Sõerd	4: Karmen Joller; Meelis Kiili; Jürgen Ligi; Vilja Toomast
Conservative People's Party	–	15: Arvo Aller; Ants Frosch; Kalle Grünthal; Helle-Moonika Helme; Mart Helme; Kert Kingo; Rene Kokk; Leo Kunnas; Alar Laneman; Siim Pohlak; Anti Poolamets; Evelin Poolamets; Henn Põlluaas; Jaak Valge; Varro Vooglaid	–	2: Rain Epler; Martin Helme
Estonian Centre Party	–	11: Jaak Aab; Vadim Belobrovtsev; Enn Eesmaa; Maria Jufereva-Skuratovski; Jaanus Karilaid; Ester Karuse; Tanel Kiik; Anastassia Kovalenko-Kõlvart; Tõnis Mölder; Jüri Ratas; Aleksandr Tšaplõgin	–	5: Andre Hanimägi; Aleksei Jevgrafov; Andrei Korobeinik; Lauri Laats; Kersti Sarapuu
G Estonia 200	14: Lauri Hussar; Züleyxa Izmailova; Irja Lutsar; Liisa-Ly Pakosta; Juku-Kalle Raid; Marek Reinaas; Kalev Stoicescu; Kadri Tali; Peeter Tali; Tarmo Tamm; Igor Taro; Tanel Tein; Hendrik Johannes Terras; Toomas Uibo	–	–	–
G Social Democratic Party	9: Anti Allas; Raimond Kaljulaid; Helmen Kütt; Priit Lomp; Tiit Maran; Eduard Odinets; Jevgeni Ossinovski; Heljo Pikhof; Reili Rand	–	–	–
Isamaa	–	8: Aivar Kokk; Tõnis Lukas; Mart Maastik; Andres Metsoja; Urmas Reinsalu; Helir-Valdor Seeder; Priit Sibul; Riina Solman	–	–
Total	55	34	1	11
Total	54.5%	33.7%	1.0%	10.9%

In Estonian, same-sex marriage is known as samasooliste abielu or more commonly as homoabielu (pronounced [ˈhomoˌɑpi.elu]) or geiabielu (pronounced [ˈkei̯ˌɑpi.elu]).

=== Statistics ===
By June 2024, 93 same-sex couples had married in Estonia; 64 female couples and 29 male couples.

=== Religious performance ===
The largest religious denominations in Estonia are the Estonian Christian Orthodox Church and the Estonian Evangelical Lutheran Church, which both oppose and do not bless same-sex marriages. In 2014, Archbishop Urmas Viilma stated that if same-sex marriage were legalized in Estonia "then the [Evangelical Church] will clearly need to redefine itself". "We clearly interpret the Bible to say that practicing homosexuality is sin... but we all are equal in God's eyes and welcome in church", he added. In 2021, he expressed his personal support for civil unions. The Church opposed the legalization of same-sex marriage in Estonia. In October 2023, it reiterated its position that clergy could only perform or bless opposite-sex marriages, after having temporarily halted registering all marriages in protest of the passage of the same-sex marriage legislation. As of 2023, an "astonishingly low" 6% of couples in Estonia were married in church.

== Public opinion ==
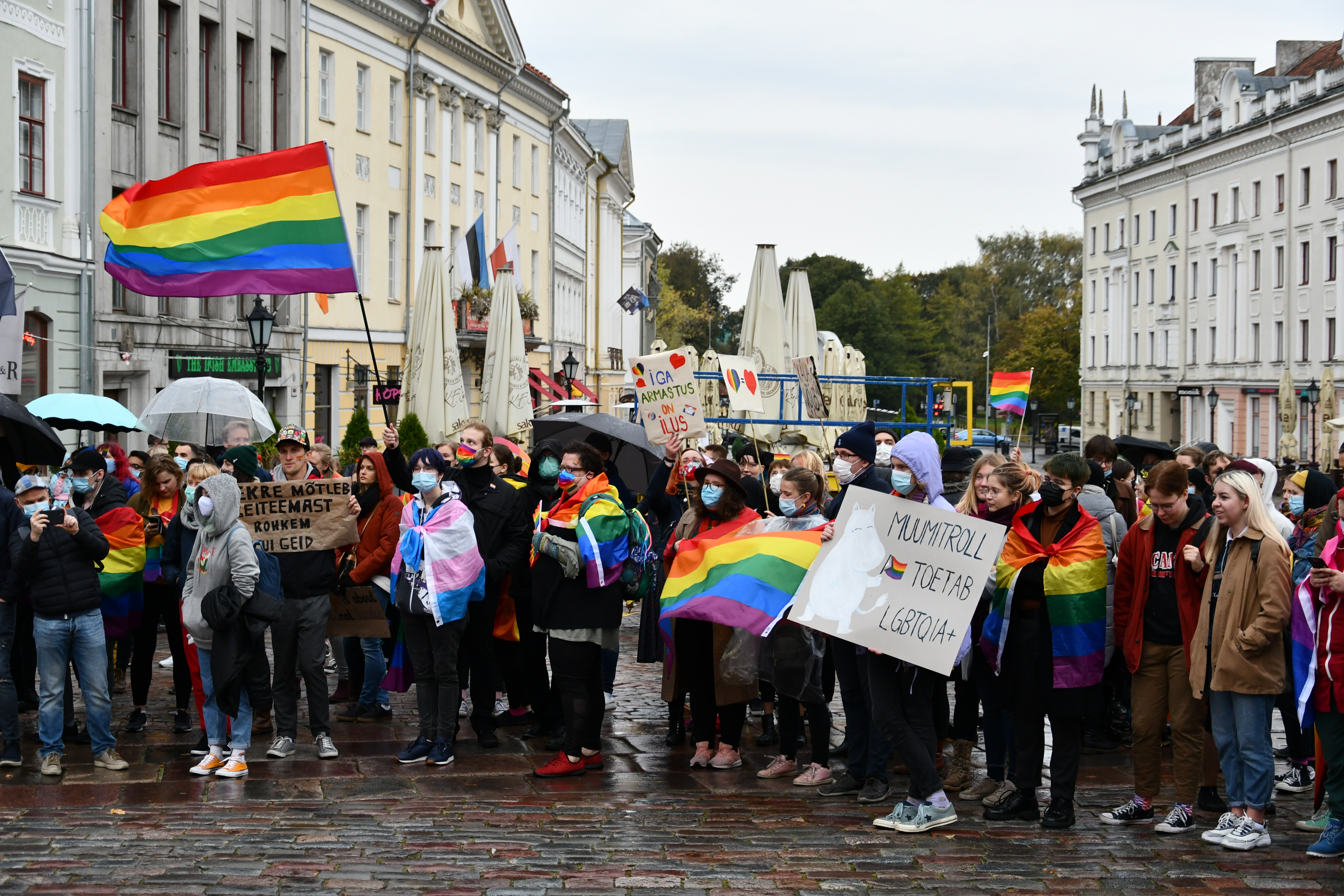
Supporters of same-sex marriage protesting in Tartu, 4 October 2020

A poll conducted in June 2009 indicated that 32% of Estonians believed same-sex couples should have the same legal rights as opposite-sex couples. Support was 40% among young people, compared to 6% among older people. A poll conducted in September 2012 found that 34% of Estonians supported same-sex marriage and 46% supported registered partnerships, with 60% and 45% opposed, respectively. The poll found an ethnic divide, with 51% of ethnic Estonians supporting registered partnerships, compared to only 21% of ethnic Russians. A similar poll conducted in 2014 during the parliamentary debate on registered partnerships found that support had dropped significantly, with 29% of respondents supporting same-sex marriage and 40% supporting registered partnerships; opposition had increased to 64% and 54%, respectively.

The 2015 Eurobarometer survey showed that 31% of Estonians supported same-sex marriage, while 58% were opposed. A poll conducted between March and April 2017 found that, while support for same-sex registered partnership legislation was almost unchanged in three years, support for same-sex marriage had increased to 39%, with 52% opposed (compared to 60% opposed in 2012 and 64% opposed in 2014). It also found that acceptance of homosexuality had increased from 34% in 2012 to 41%, with 52% against. At the same time, support for joint adoption rights remained unchanged, with 66% opposed. Support for registered partnerships was highest among young people and Estonian speakers.

The 2019 Eurobarometer found that 41% of Estonians thought same-sex marriage should be allowed throughout Europe, while 51% were opposed. A poll conducted following the failed referendum attempt showed that support for same-sex marriage and registered partnerships had increased in Estonia. The survey conducted by the Estonian Human Rights Centre (EHRC; Eesti Inimõiguste Keskus) and Turu-uuringute AS in 2021 showed that 64% of Estonians supported same-sex registered partnerships (35% "fully" and 29% "somewhat"), and 47% supported same-sex marriage. Support was highest among Estonian speakers; with support for partnerships rising to 72% and for same-sex marriage to 53%. Support for partnerships fell to 47% among native speakers of other languages (mostly the Russian-speaking minority) and to 35% for same-sex marriage. In addition, 53% of Estonians considered same-sex attraction "acceptable", with 73% of people aged 15–19 agreeing.

A poll conducted in March 2023 by the Liberal Citizen Foundation (SALK; Sihtasutus Liberaalne Kodanik) found that 45% of respondents were in favour of same-sex marriage (25% "fully" and 20% "somewhat") and 43% were against (29% "fully" and 14% "somewhat"), while 12% were undecided or had refused to answer. An EHRC April 2023 poll carried out by Turu-uuringute AS showed that 53% of Estonians supported same-sex marriage. Support was highest among Estonian speakers at 58% and among people aged 20–29 at 75%. The 2023 Eurobarometer found that 41% of Estonians thought same-sex marriage should be allowed throughout Europe, while 51% were opposed. The survey also found that 51% of Estonians thought that "there is nothing wrong in a sexual relationship between two persons of the same sex", while 42% disagreed. A 2026 EHRC survey showed that 53% of Estonians supported same-sex marriage. Support varied significantly with language group, standing at 60% among Estonian speakers but decreasing to 38% among Russian speakers. 82% of people aged 18–29 also expressed support for same-sex marriage.

== See also ==
- LGBT rights in Estonia
- Same-sex marriage in Finland
- Recognition of same-sex unions in Latvia
- Recognition of same-sex unions in Lithuania
- Recognition of same-sex unions in Europe
