= Estonian Reform Party Youth =

Youth wing of the Estonian Reform Party

Estonian Reform Party Youth Reforminoored
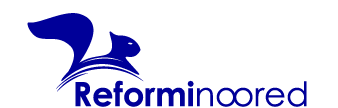
- Leader: Martin Ottas
- Secretary General: Emil Laanemets
- Founded: November 13, 1997
- Ideology: Classical liberalism
- Mother party: Estonian Reform Party
- International affiliation: European Liberal Youth (LYMEC)
- Website: reforminoored.ee

The Estonian Reform Party Youth (ERPY) (Estonian: Reforminoored) is the youth wing of Estonian Reform Party.

Key issues for the ERPY have been economic liberalism, low taxes, human rights, e-democracy and Pro-Europeanism.

== History ==
On November 13, 1997, the first regional club of ERPY was founded in Tartu Town Hall. It was soon followed by the formation of clubs in Tallinn and Viljandi, which prompted the formation of ERPY as a national organisation in 2000.

In 2000 ERPY obtained LYMEC observer status.

In 2003, Rain Rosimannus became the first member of Riigikogu with a background in ERPY. In the same year, ERPY member Urmas Paet became the Minister of Culture.

In 2007, a total of 7 ERPY members (including alumni) became members of parliament.

From 2014 to 2016, Taavi Rõivas (ERPY leader 2001-2003) was the Prime Minister of Estonia.

Since 2023, ERPY Tallinn founder Kristen Michal is the Minister of Climate in Kaja Kallas's third cabinet.

As of 2024, the current members of Riigikogu with a background in ERPY include Erkki Keldo, Hanah Lahe, Kristo Enn Vaga, Õnne Pillak and Anti Haugas.
