= Ernits =

Family name

Ernits is a surname of Estonian origin.

People with this name include:

- Heiki Ernits (born 1953), Estonian animator, illustrator, and film director.
- Peeter Ernits (born 1953), Estonian zoologist, journalist and politician
- Villem Ernits (1891–1982), Estonian politician
