= Pärtel-Peeter Pere =

Estonian entrepreneur, urban strategist and politician

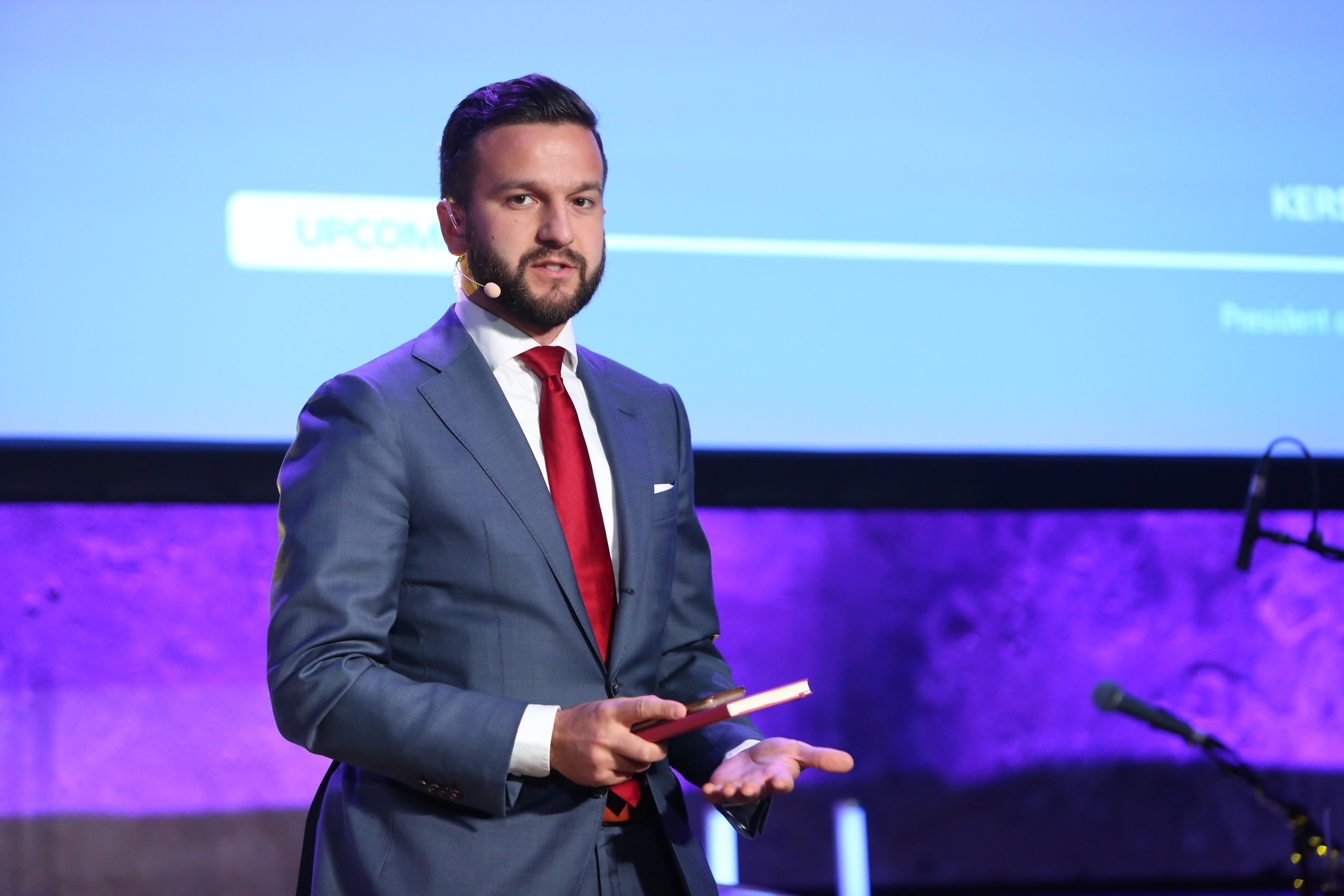

Personal details
- Born: 19 December 1985 (age 40) Tallinn
- Party: Estonian Reform Party (until 2026)
- Education: Tallinn University

Pärtel-Peeter Pere (born 19 December 1985) is an Estonian entrepreneur, urban strategist, and politician, representing the Estonian Reform Party (Estonian: Eesti Reformierakond). Following the 2023 Estonian parliamentary election, he was elected to the Riigikogu.

== Biography ==
Pärtel-Peeter Pere was born in Tallinn. He attended Gustav Adolf Grammar School, graduating in 2005. In 2009, he graduated from Tallinn University, with a bachelor's degree in Swedish language and culture theory. In 2009, he enrolled at the Academy of Music of Woluwe-Saint-Lambert, Belgium, studying jazz guitar and jazz piano, graduating in 2014. From 2013 until 2015, he was the Head of Office and policy advisor of Indrek Tarand at the European Parliament in Brussels. In 2014, he translated Dutch historian and political philosopher Luuk van Middelaar's book Passage to Europe into the Estonian language.

He co-founded and held multiple positions in Future Place Leadership, a Stockholm-based consultancy specializing in the development, innovation and marketing of places. He has held a number of advisory and consultancy positions during his career.

Pere has belonged to the Estonian Reform Party since 13 March 2021. In November 2021, he was elected as a member of the Tallinn City Council. He campaigned for election in electoral district no. 1 (Haabersti, Põhja-Tallinn and Kristiine) in the 2023 Estonian parliamentary election of the Riigikogu and collected 1473 votes and was elected to XV Riigikogu. On 20 April 2023, the Reform Party announced that Pere was the party's new Tallinn branch chairman.

He left the Reform Party in 2026.
