= Anti Allas =

Estonian politician (born 1977)

Mayor of Võru
- In office 11 November 2013 – April 2023

Member of the Riigikogu

Personal details
- Born: November 26, 1977 (age 48) Võru, then part of Estonian SSR, Soviet Union
- Party: Social Democratic Party
- Education: Estonian University of Life Sciences
- Occupation: Politician

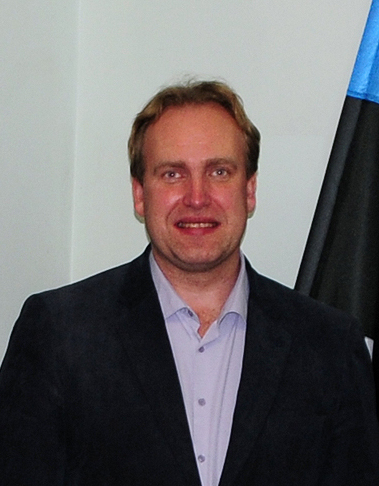

Anti Allas (born 26 November 1977) is an Estonian politician. He was the mayor of Võru from 11 November 2013 to April 2023, and is the deputy chairman of the Social Democratic Party (SDE) since 5 February 2022. Following the 2023 Estonian parliamentary election, he became a member of the Riigikogu.

== Education ==
Anti Allas was born in Võru. He studied at Lepistu Basic School, Rõuge Basic School and graduated from Võru Kreutzwald Gymnasium in 1996. In 2000, he graduated from the Estonian Agricultural University with a degree in land management.

== Political career ==
In the 2013 local government council elections, Allas was a candidate on the list of Social Democrats in the city of Võru and was elected with 479 votes. His vote share was the largest of all the candidates. After the elections, the Social Democratic Party, the Estonian Centre Party and the electoral alliance Võru signed a coalition agreement, and on 11 November 2013, Allas was elected mayor.

In January 2014, he joined the Social Democratic Party.

In the 2017 local elections, he ran as a candidate again in Võru and collected 1506 votes (26% of the votes). Although the Social Democrats won a majority in the council (11 out of 21 mandates), a coalition agreement was signed with the Centre Party. On 1 November 2017, Allas was re-elected mayor.

Allas was a candidate in the 2019 Riigikogu elections in Võru, Valga and Põlva counties in last place in the list of Docial Democrats. He garnered 789 votes, which was the second-best result on the list, but was not elected.

In the 2021 local government council elections, Allas collected 1341 votes in the city of Võru. The Social Democrats won 10 mandates in the council and signed a coalition agreement with the Reform Party and the Centre Party. On 24 November, Allas was elected mayor for the third time.

After the 2023 Estonian parliamentary election, he became a member of the Riigikogu and Kalvi Kõva was elected mayor of Võru in his place.
