= Varro Vooglaid =

Estonian lawyer, social activist and politician

Member of the XV Riigikogu

Personal details
- Born: 13 September 1980 (age 46) Estonia
- Children: 9
- Parent(s): Ülo Vooglaid, Kersti Nigesen
- Education: University of Tartu, University of Helsinki
- Occupation: Politician, lawyer, social activist

Varro Vooglaid (13 September 1980) is an Estonian lawyer, social activist, and politician. He is a member of the XV Riigikogu.

Vooglaid is one of the founders of the Foundation for the Protection of Family and Tradition (Sihtasutus Perekonna ja Traditsiooni Kaitseks, or SAPTK) and has been its chairman since 2011. Vooglaid has been one of the leaders of the campaign against the Cohabitation Act in Estonia. Since 2015, he has also been one of the founders, executive editor, and columnist of SAPTK's news and opinion portal, Objektiiv.

== Biography ==
Vooglaid was born in 1980 to social scientist, educator and politician Ülo Vooglaid and educator Kersti Nigesen. He obtained his bachelor's degree from the Faculty of Law at the University of Tartu in 2003. He then pursued further studies at the Faculty of Law at the University of Helsinki, where he earned a master's degree in 2004 and continued his studies in the doctoral program.

From 2004 to 2007, Vooglaid worked as an extraordinary assistant at the Public Law Institute of the Faculty of Law at the University of Tartu. From 2007 to 2011, he served as a researcher at the Erik Castrén Institute of International Law and Human Rights at the University of Helsinki, specializing in global governance studies.

From December 2011 to December 2015, Vooglaid was a lecturer in comparative law at the Public Law Institute of the Faculty of Law at the University of Tartu. He returned to the same position from January 2016 to December 2017.

=== Political career ===
Varro Vooglaid and Markus Järvi were invited to join the Estonian Conservative People's Party (EKRE) but both declined.

On 8 November 2022, Varro Vooglaid and Markus Järvi announced that they would run as independent candidates on the list of the EKRE in the 2023 Riigikogu elections. Vooglaid ran in electoral district number 1, which covers Tallinn Haabersti, Põhja-Tallinn, and Kristiine districts. He received 2,518 votes and was elected to the Riigikogu.

Varro Vooglaid has gained attention for his active use of social media, with Facebook being his primary platform for disseminating messages. In 2018, he received a one-month suspension from Facebook due to hate speech. His presence on Twitter has been less successful.

== Personal life ==
Vooglaid is a Catholic, married, and has eight children.
