= Peeter Tali =

Estonian military personnel and journalist

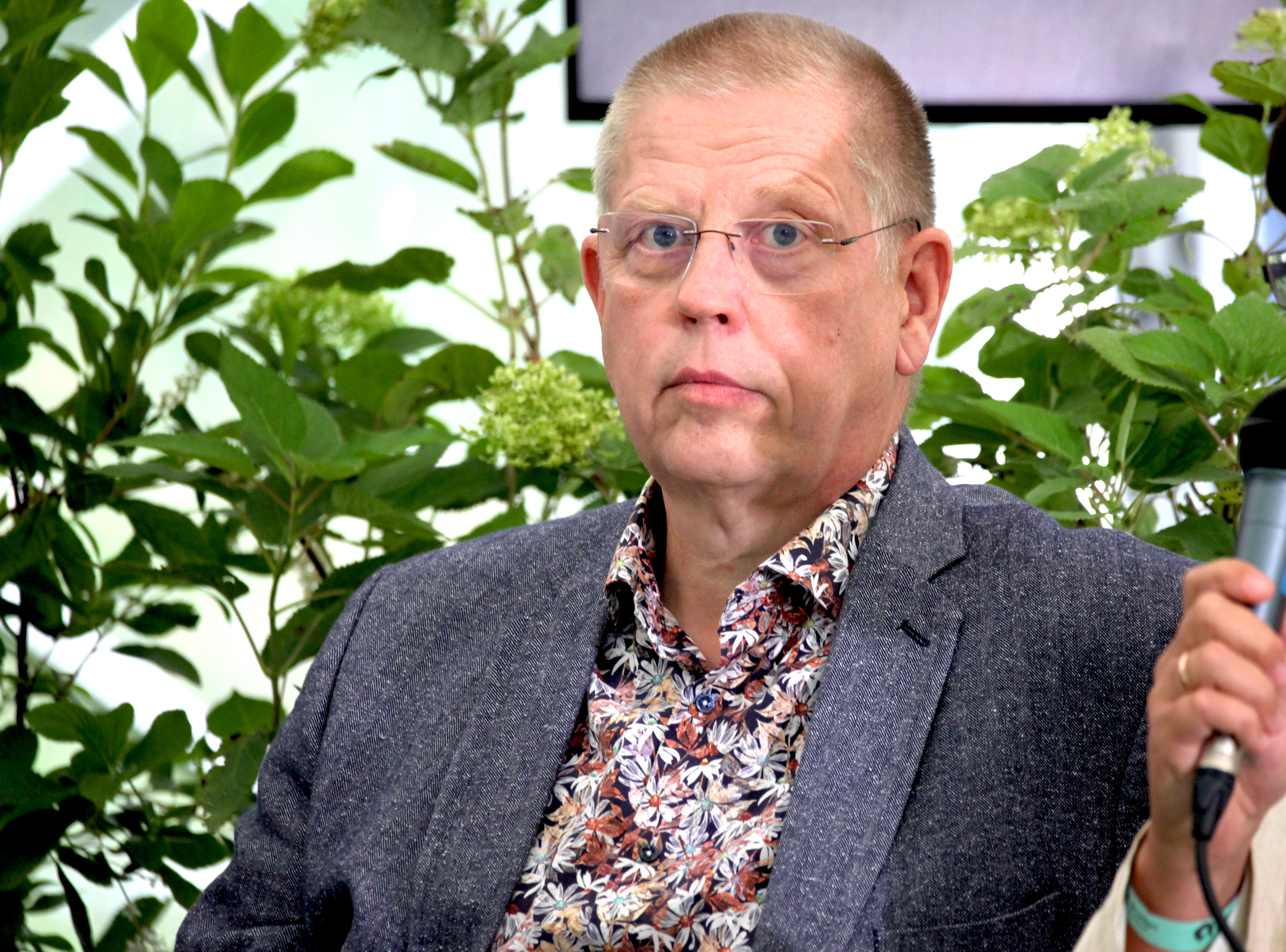

Member of the XV Riigikogu

Personal details
- Born: August 6, 1964 (age 61) Pärnu, then part of Estonian SSR, Soviet Union
- Occupation: Politician, military officer, journalist

Peeter Tali (born 6 August 1964 in Pärnu) is an Estonian military officer and journalist.

== Biography ==
In 1990s he was a member of the Congress of Estonia. 1993-1994 he was the chief editor of news agency ETA. 1994-1995 he was the chief editor of newspaper Rahva Hääl.

Since October 2012, he is the head of the Ministry of Defence's Strategic Communications Department (Estonian: Kaitseministeeriumi strateegilise kommunikatsiooni osakonna juhataja).

In 2006, he was awarded Order of the Cross of the Eagle, V class.

In the 2023 Riigikogu elections, he ran as a candidate for the Estonia 200 party after having joined the party on January 18, 2023. He was elected to the Riigikogu from the 12th electoral district in Pärnumaa with 1,157 votes.
