= Maido Ruusmann =

Estonian politician (born 1983)

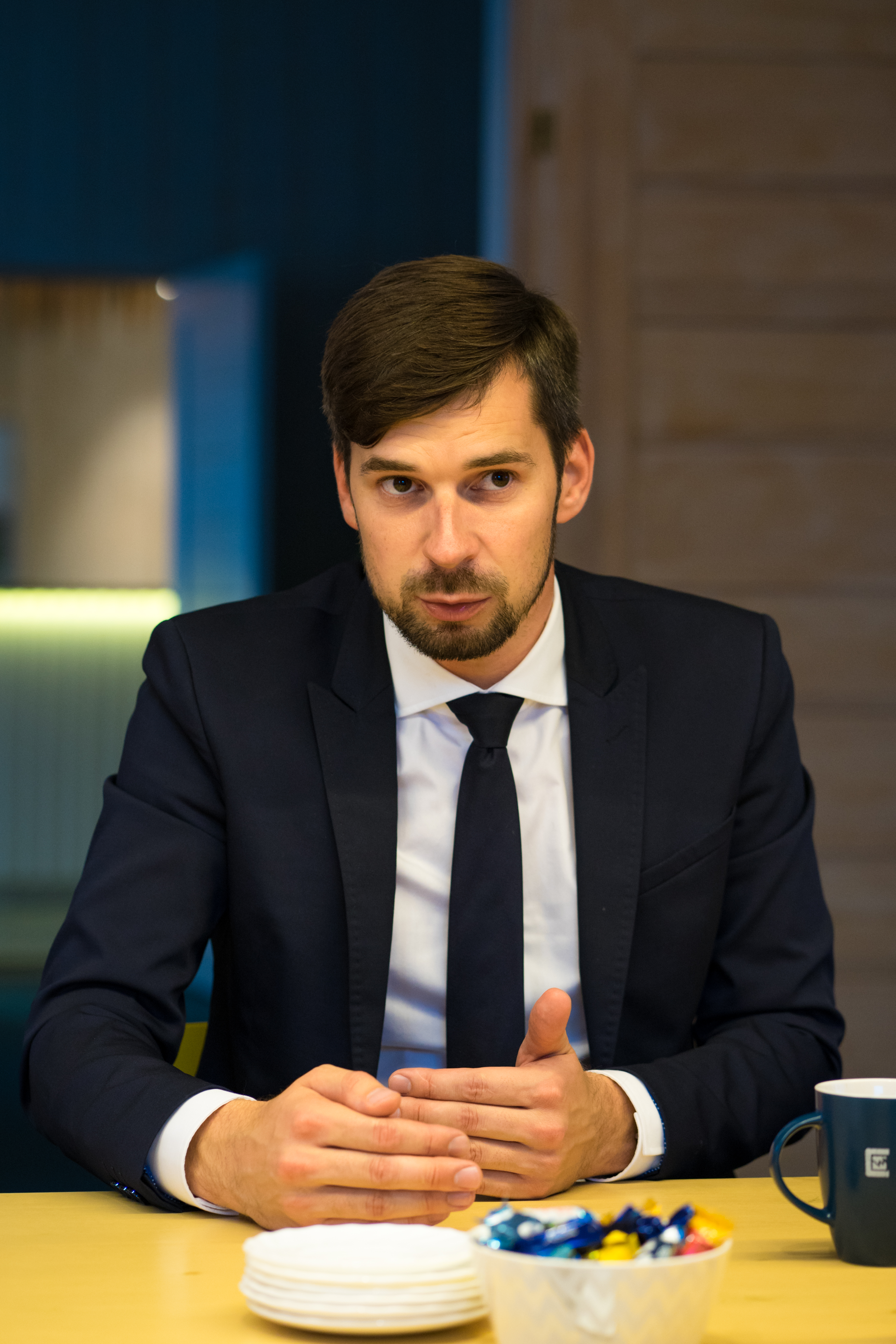
Maido Ruusmann in 2018

Maido Ruusmann (born 27 June 1983) is an Estonian politician. From 2013 until 2017, he was the Mayor of Tõrva, and from 2017 until 2023, he was the Elder of Tõrva Parish. In 2023, he was elected as a member of XV Riigikogu, representing the Estonian Reform Party.
