= Rein Ratas =

Estonian politician (1938–2022)

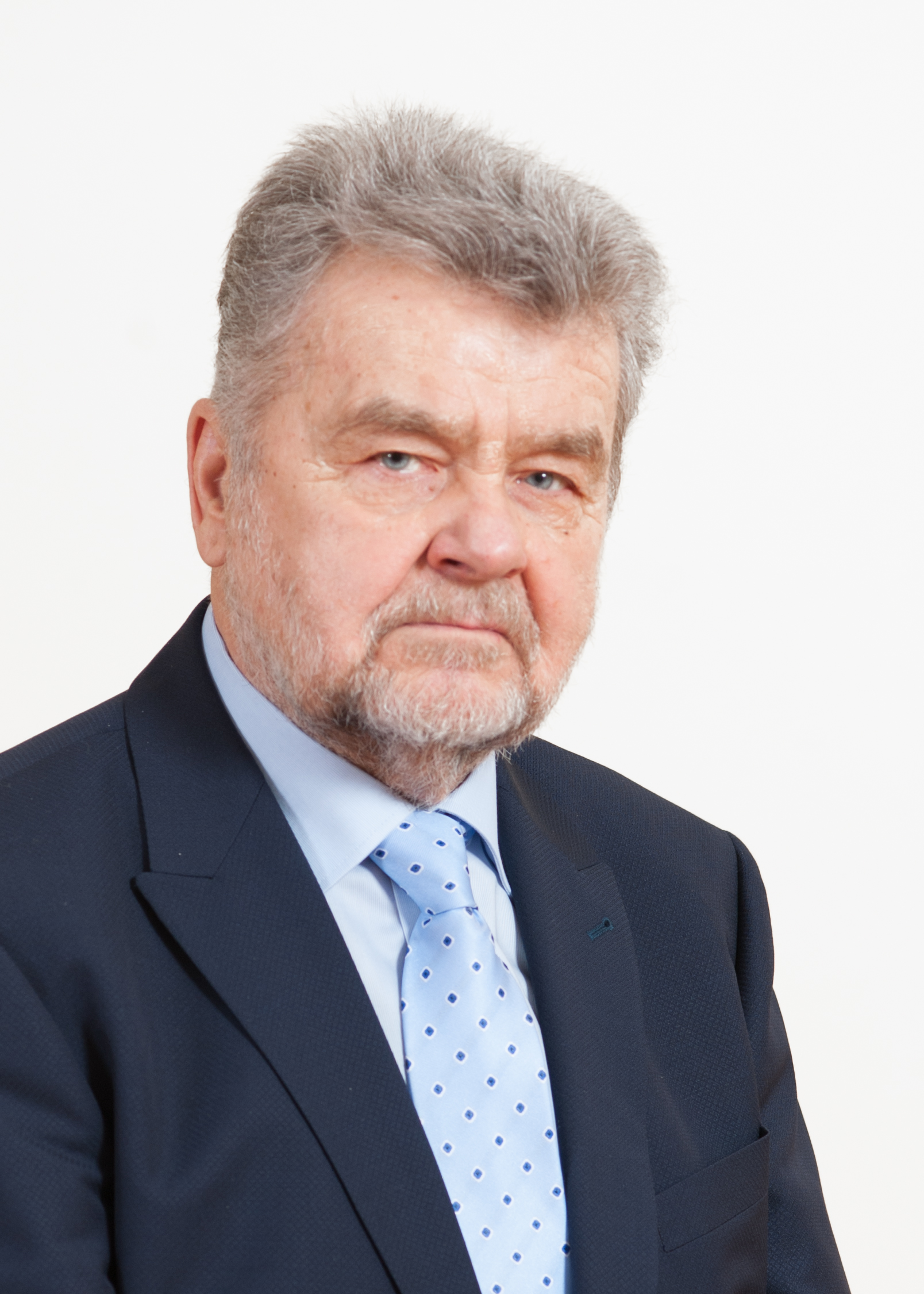

Member of the Riigikogu
- In office 2007–2011
- In office 2015–2018

Personal details
- Born: 9 May 1938 Häädemeeste, Estonia
- Died: 18 April 2022 (aged 83) Tallinn, Estonia
- Party: Estonian Centre Party
- Children: Jüri Ratas

Rein Ratas (9 May 1938 – 18 April 2022) was an Estonian politician, representing the Estonian Centre Party. Ratas served in the Riigikogu from 2007 to 2011 and again from 2015 to 2018. Due to a lengthy illness, Ratas was substituted by Igor Kravtšenko from December 2016 until September 2018, when Ratas formally left his seat for Kravtšenko.

Ratas is the father of former Estonian Prime Minister Jüri Ratas.

Ratas died on 18 April 2022, aged 83.
