= Mario Kadastik =

Estonian politician (born 1981)

Mario Kadastik (born 5 November 1981) is an Estonian physicist and politician representing the Estonian Reform Party. He is a member of XV Riigikogu.
