= Eduard Odinets =

Estonian politician

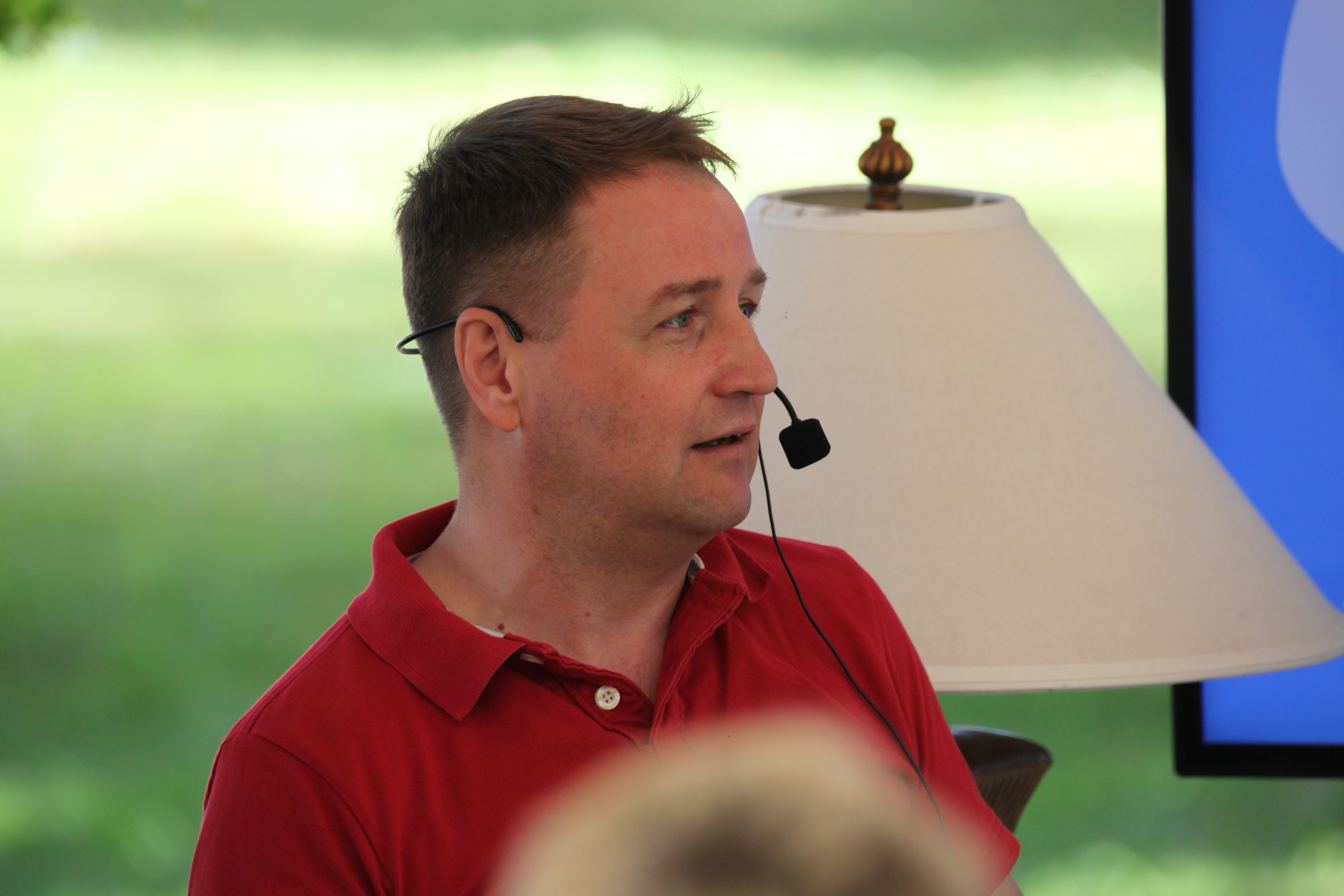
Eduard Odinets at the Opinion Festival 2022 in Paide, Estonia

Eduard Odinets (born 27 May 1976 in Kohtla-Järve) is an Estonian politician. He was a member of the XIV and XV Riigikogu.

2000–2009 and again from 2021, he is a member of Social Democratic Party.

In November 2024, Odinets married Arvo Niitmets.
