= Jaanus Karilaid =

Estonian politician

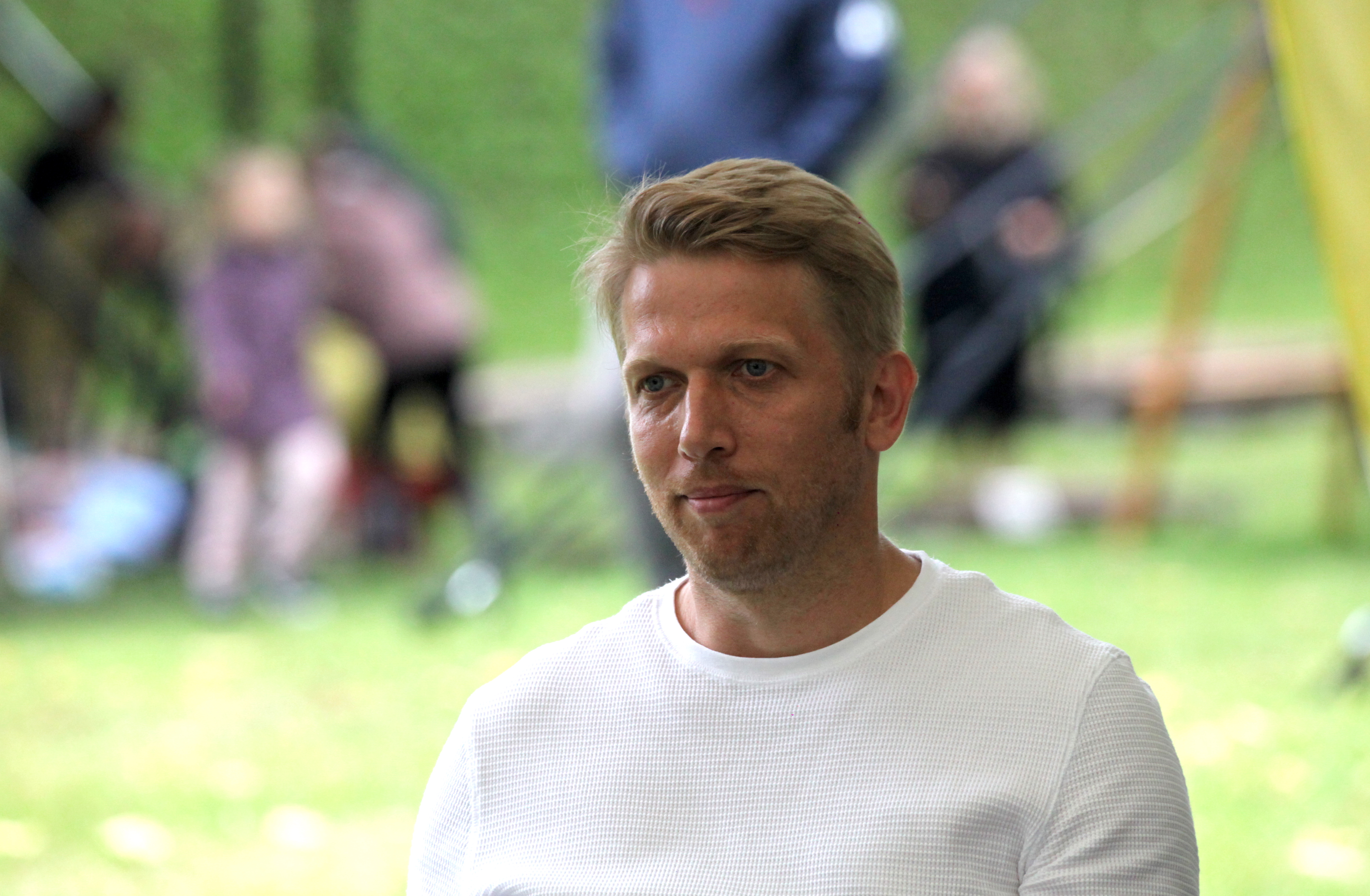
Jaanus Karilaid at the Opinion Festival 2021 in Paide, Estonia

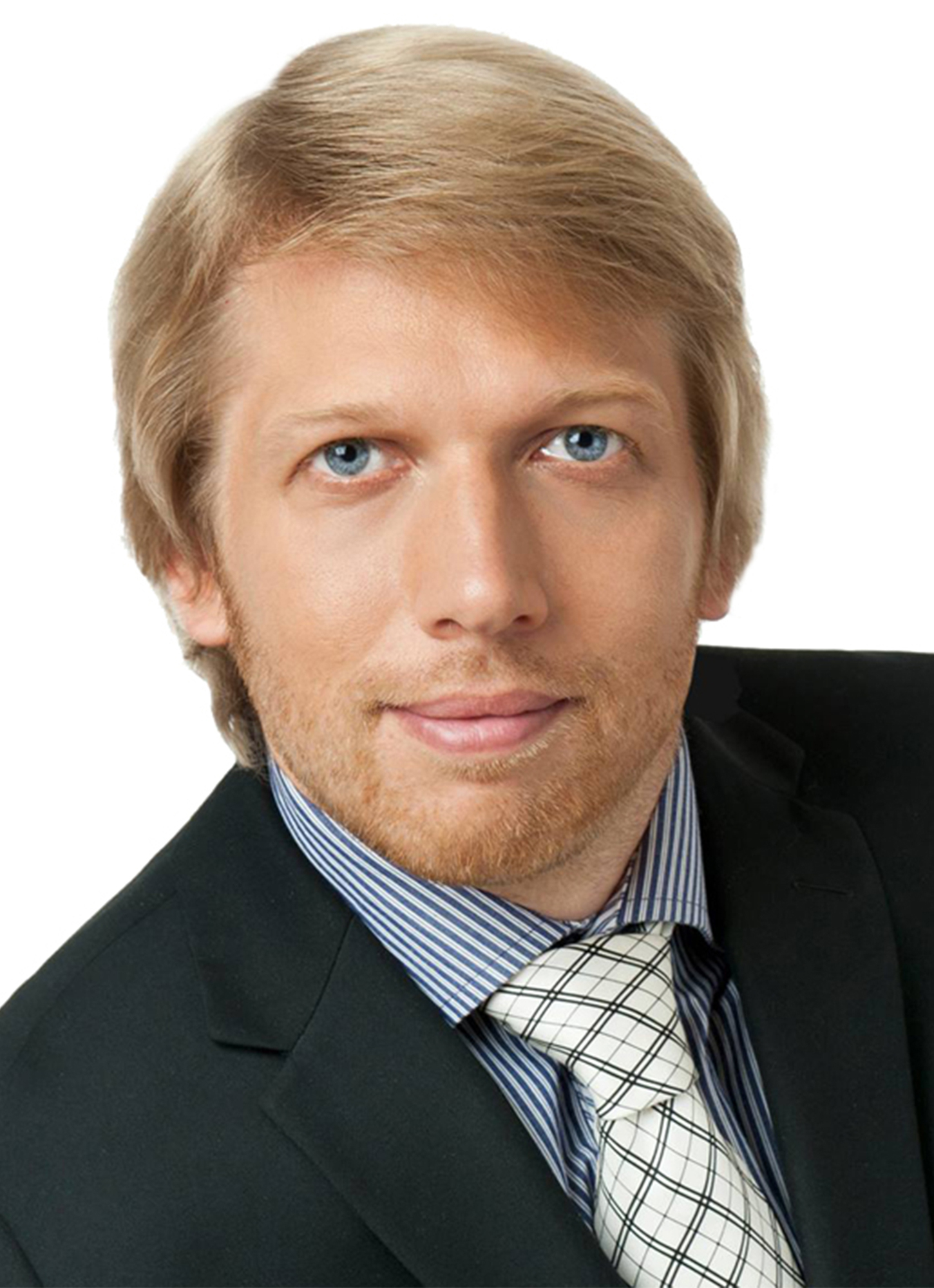
Jaanus Karilaid in 2015

Jaanus Karilaid (born 1 February 1977 in Tallinn) is an Estonian politician. He has been member of the XIII, XIV Riigikogu and XV Riigikogu.

In 2007 he graduated from Tallinn University with a degree in political science.

Since 1997 he has been a member of Estonian Centre Party, as well as the Vice-Chairman of the party.
