= Juku-Kalle Raid =

Estonian politician (born 1974)

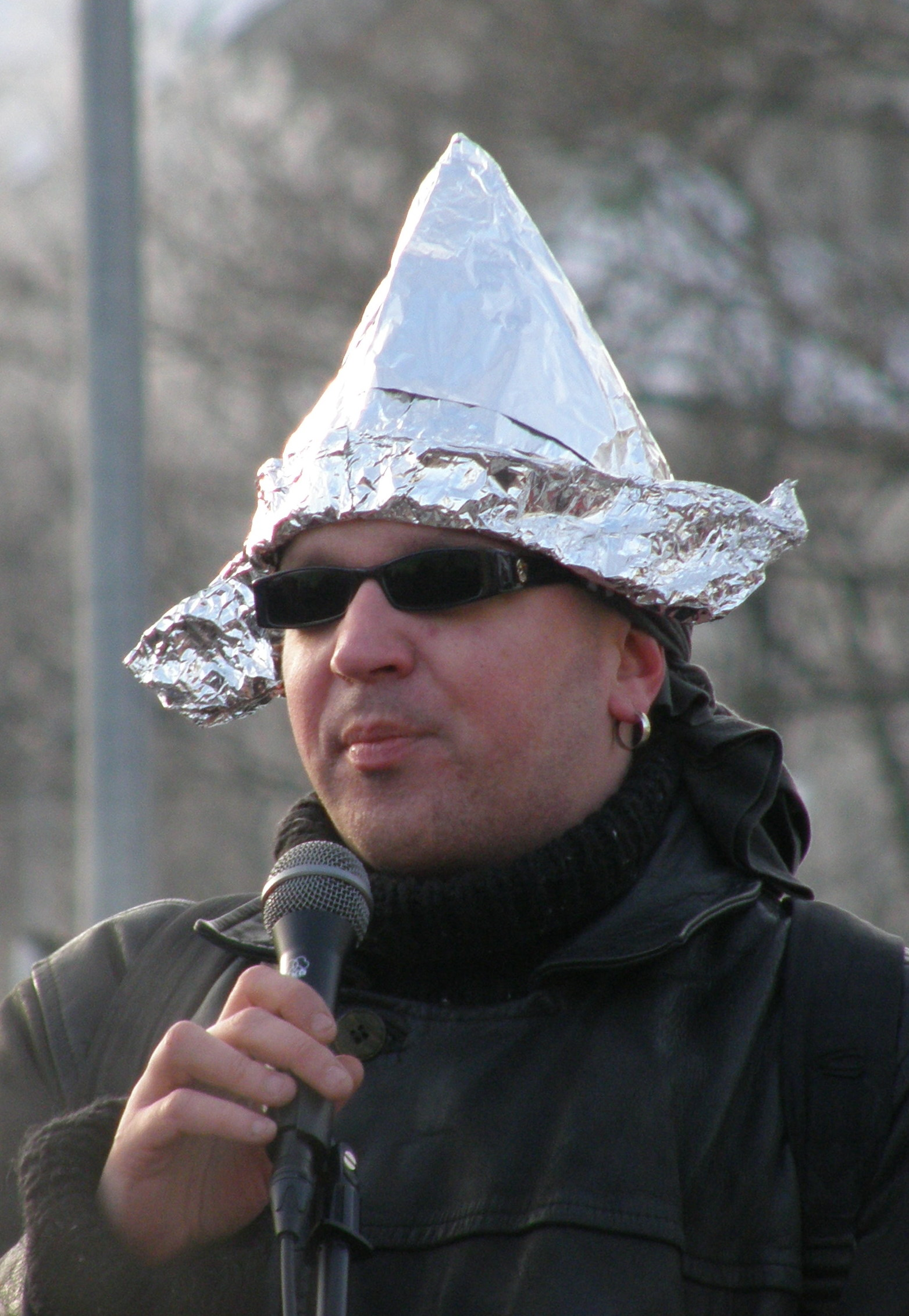

Member of XII Riigikogu Member of the XV Riigikogu

Personal details
- Born: 28 July 1974 (age 52)
- Occupation: Politician, journalist, poet

Juku-Kalle Raid (born 28 July 1974) is an Estonian journalist, poet and politician. He was a member of XII Riigikogu and a serving member of the XV Riigikogu.
