= Aleksandr Tšaplõgin =

Estonian journalist and politician

Aleksandr Tšaplõgin (born 20 August 1964) is an Estonian Russian language journalist and politician. Following the 2023 Estonian parliamentary election, he was elected as a member of the XV Riigikogu, representing the Estonian Centre Party.
