= Kersti Sarapuu =

Estonian politician

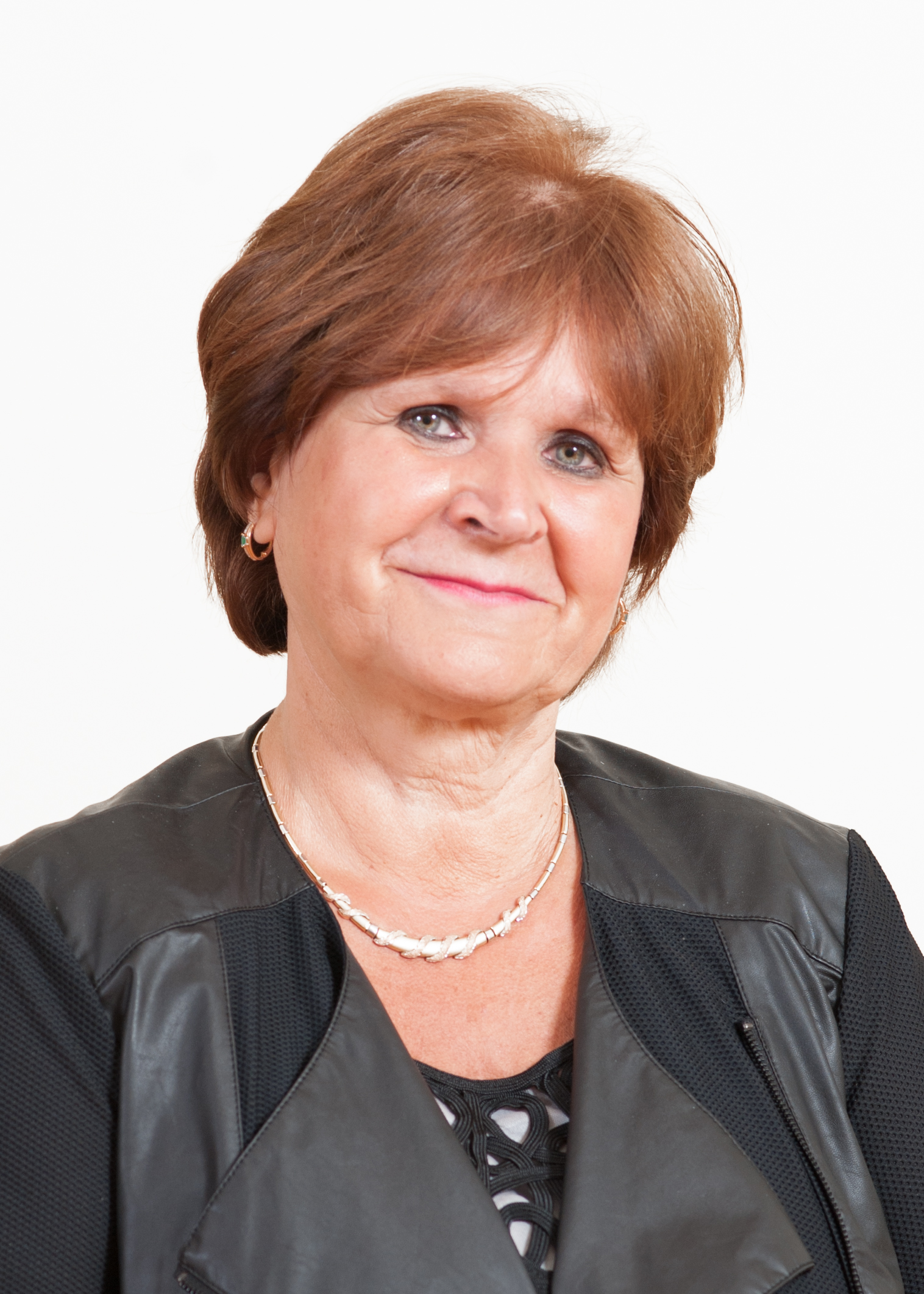
- Sarapuu (2015)
- Born: 5 May 1954 (age 72); Põltsamaa, Jõgeva County, Estonia
- Education: Tallinn University of Technology
- Occupation: politician
- Known for: member, Riigikogu mayor, Paide
- Political party: Estonian Centre Party

Kersti Sarapuu (born 5 May 1954 in Põltsamaa, Jõgeva County) is an Estonian politician. She has been a member of the XIII and XIV Riigikogu.

In 1986 she graduated from Tallinn University of Technology in industry management and planning.

From 2005 to 2011 she was the mayor of Paide.

Since 2002 she is a member of Estonian Centre Party.
