= Meelis Mälberg =

Estonian politician (born 1970)

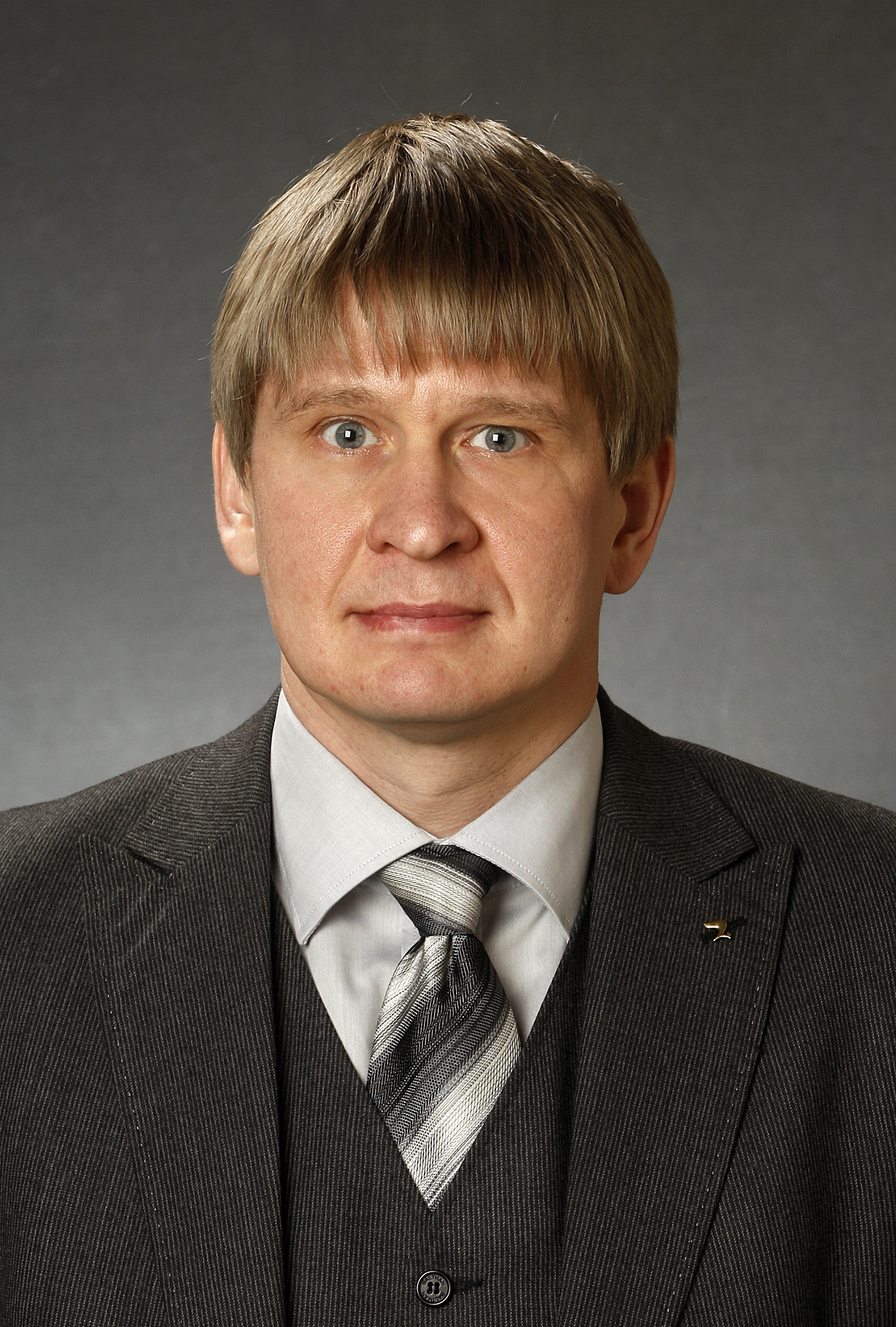
Meelis Mälberg in 2011.

Meelis Mälberg (born 26 April 1970 in Räpina) is an Estonian politician. He was a member of X, XII and XIII Riigikogu.

He is a member of the Estonian Reform Party. Mälberg was the mayor of Räpina from 1998 until 2002 and the mayor of Otepää from 2008 until 2009. From 2015 until 2019, he was the president of the Estonian Orienteering Federation.
