= Igor Kravtšenko =

Estonian politician

Member of the Riigikogu
- Incumbent
- Assumed office 14 September 2018

Personal details
- Born: 28 March 1973 (age 53) Tartu, Estonia
- Party: Estonian Centre Party

Igor Kravtšenko (born 28 March 1973) is an Estonian politician, representing the Estonian Centre Party. Kravtšenko first rose to the Riigikogu to substitute for MP Rein Ratas in December 2016. He went on to act as a substitute until 14 September 2018, when Ratas formally left his seat for Kravtšenko. In the Riigikogu, Kravtšenko has served in the Environment Committee from December 2016 to November 2017 and in the Social Affairs Committee since November 2017.

Kravtšenko took part in the 2019 parliamentary election, but he was not elected. However, as Mustamäe district elder Lauri Laats declined his seat in the Riigikogu, his mandate was passed on to Kravtšenko.
