= Andrei Korobeinik =

Estonian software entrepreneur and politician

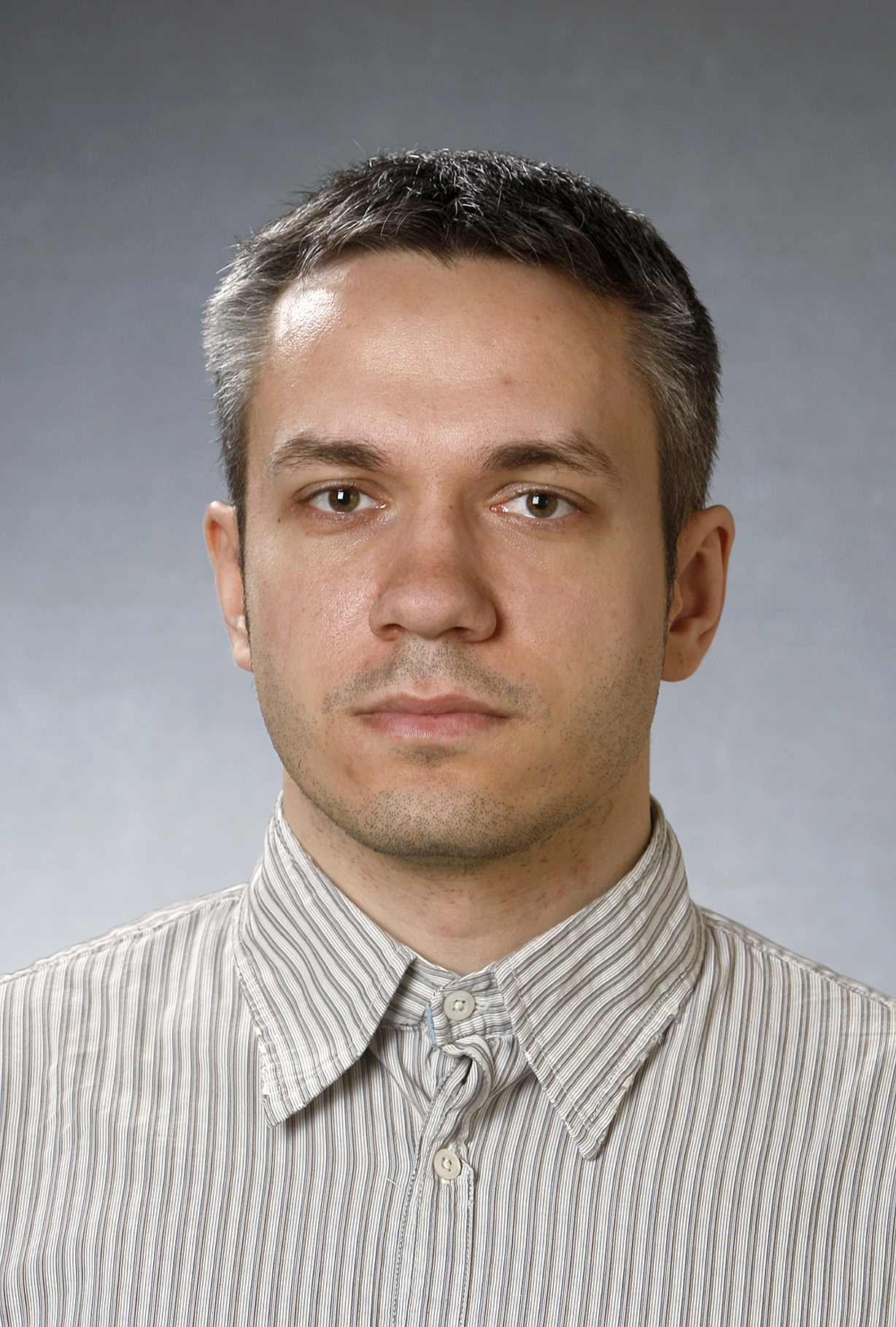
- Born: 5 November 1980 (age 45); Pärnu, then part of Estonian SSR, Soviet Union
- Occupations: Programmer, Investor, Entrepreneur
- Known for: www.rate.ee, www.cutefund.com, www.flirtic.com

Andrei Korobeinik (born 5 November 1980) is an Estonian computer programmer and entrepreneur, founder and CEO of Rate Solutions and Serenda Invest. He is better known as creator of Estonian social networking site, Rate.ee. Between 2011 and 2013 he was a member of the Estonian parliament.

In 2005, 51% share of the Rate.ee portal was sold to EMT for 39 million Estonian kroons (approximately 2 million EUR), making Andrei one of the youngest Estonian millionaires of that time. However, in 2012 Serenda Invest; a company that manages Rate.ee was purchased back from EMT which essentially put Andrei back in charge of his web portal. The price of this deal has not been revealed.

Korobeinik is the winner of 2008 British Council's International Young Interactive Entrepreneur Award. He is the member of Estonian Dragon's Den jury and does angel investments, mostly into internet start-ups.

Korobeinik has been on the jury at the annual Estonian TV show Ajujaht.

== Education ==
Korobeinik graduated from Pärnu Russian Gymnasium in 1998, same year he started with his undergraduate studies at University of Tartu in maths and information technology.

== Other business ventures ==
In 2010, he started a new project Cutefund.com. Cutefund.com is a crowdsourced mutual fund, designed to buy and sell stock on behalf of investors. Cutefund.com is currently awaiting for a license to trade stock, until then users can register and compete with each other for free in demo mode. Korobeinik is the author of idea for Flirtic.com, a dating website popular in Eastern Europe and Russia.

== Political career ==
In the 2011 Estonian parliamentary election, Korobeinik ran for Riigikogu membership for Pärnu County. He got 2057 votes but did not make it to the Parliament. He became a member of the Estonian Parliament starting on 6 April 2011, replacing Rein Lang who went to serve as the Minister of Culture of Estonia. When Lang step down on December 4, 2013, Korobeinik lost his place in the Parliament. Korobeinik was a chairman of e-parliament committee.

== Hobbies ==
He is a chess player, and on 20 November 2011 was elected as president of Estonian Chess Union.
