= Dmitri Dmitrijev =

Estonian politician (born 1982)

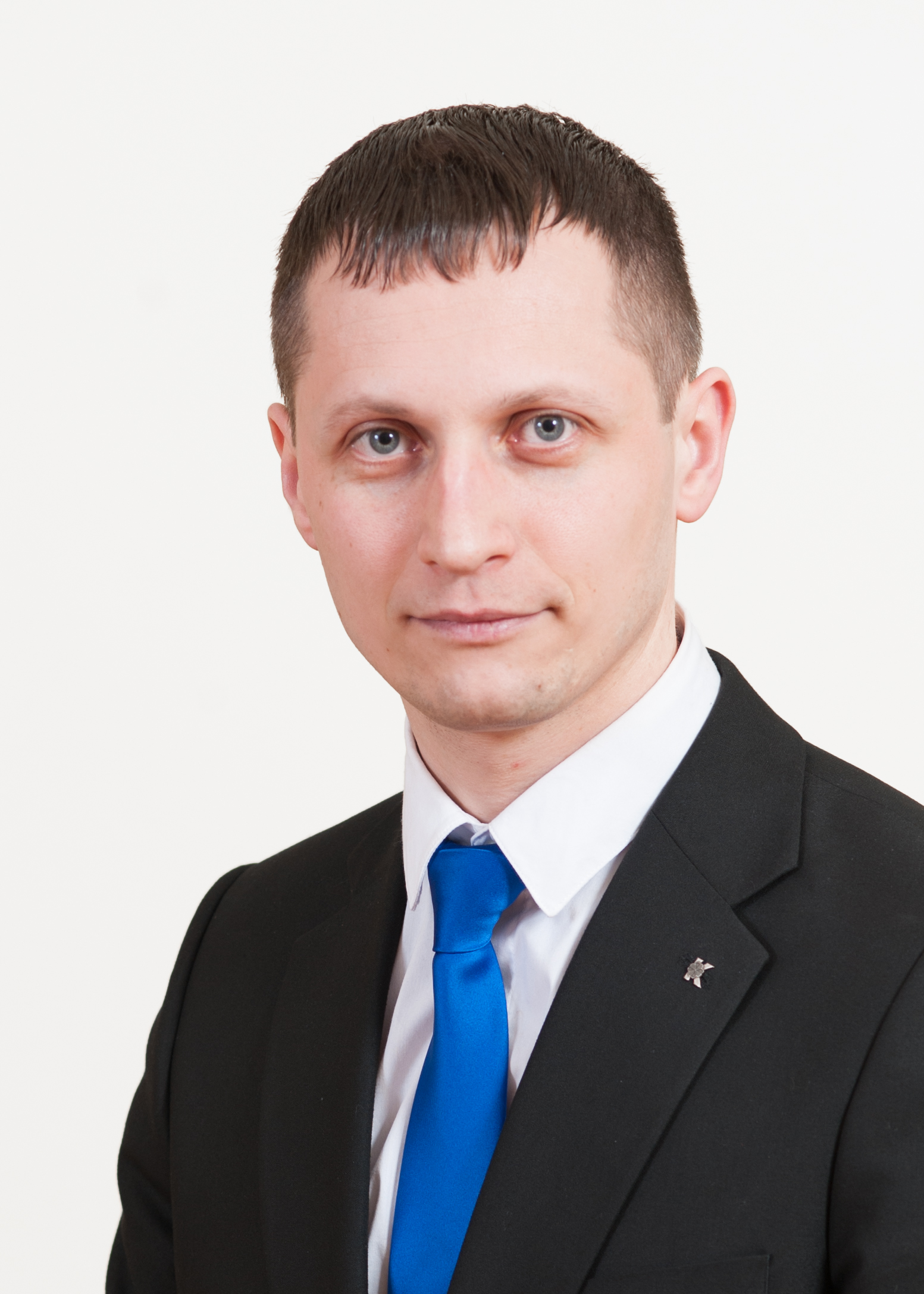
Dmitri Dmitrijev

Dmitri Dmitrijev (born 17 June 1982) is an Estonian politician. He is a member of XIV Riigikogu. Since 2005 he has belonged to the Estonian Centre Party.

Dmitrijev was born in Kiviõli. He graduated from the Kiviõli Russian Gymnasium in 2000, and from Tallinn University of Technology in 2005 with a degree in business administration. From 2007 until 2015 he was the mayor of Kiviõli.

He was also a member of the XIII Riigikogu.
