= Barbi Pilvre =

Estonian journalist, lecturer and politician

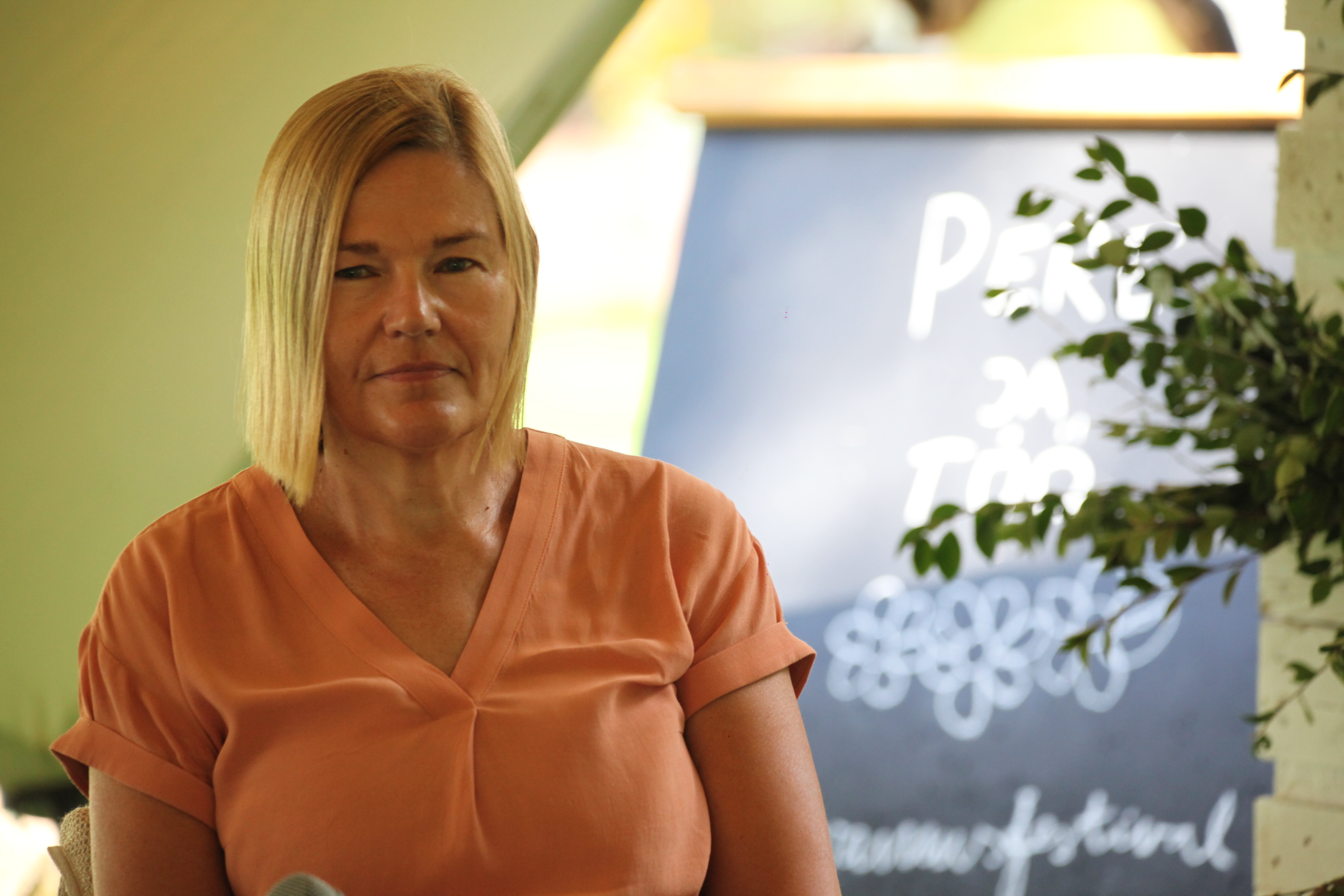
Barbi-Jenny Pilvre-Storgård

Barbi-Jenny Pilvre-Storgård (born 19 April 1963) is an Estonian journalist, lecturer and politician. She was a member of the XII and XIII Riigikogu.

She is a member of the Estonian Social Democratic Party.
