= Terje Trei =

Estonian politician (born 1967)

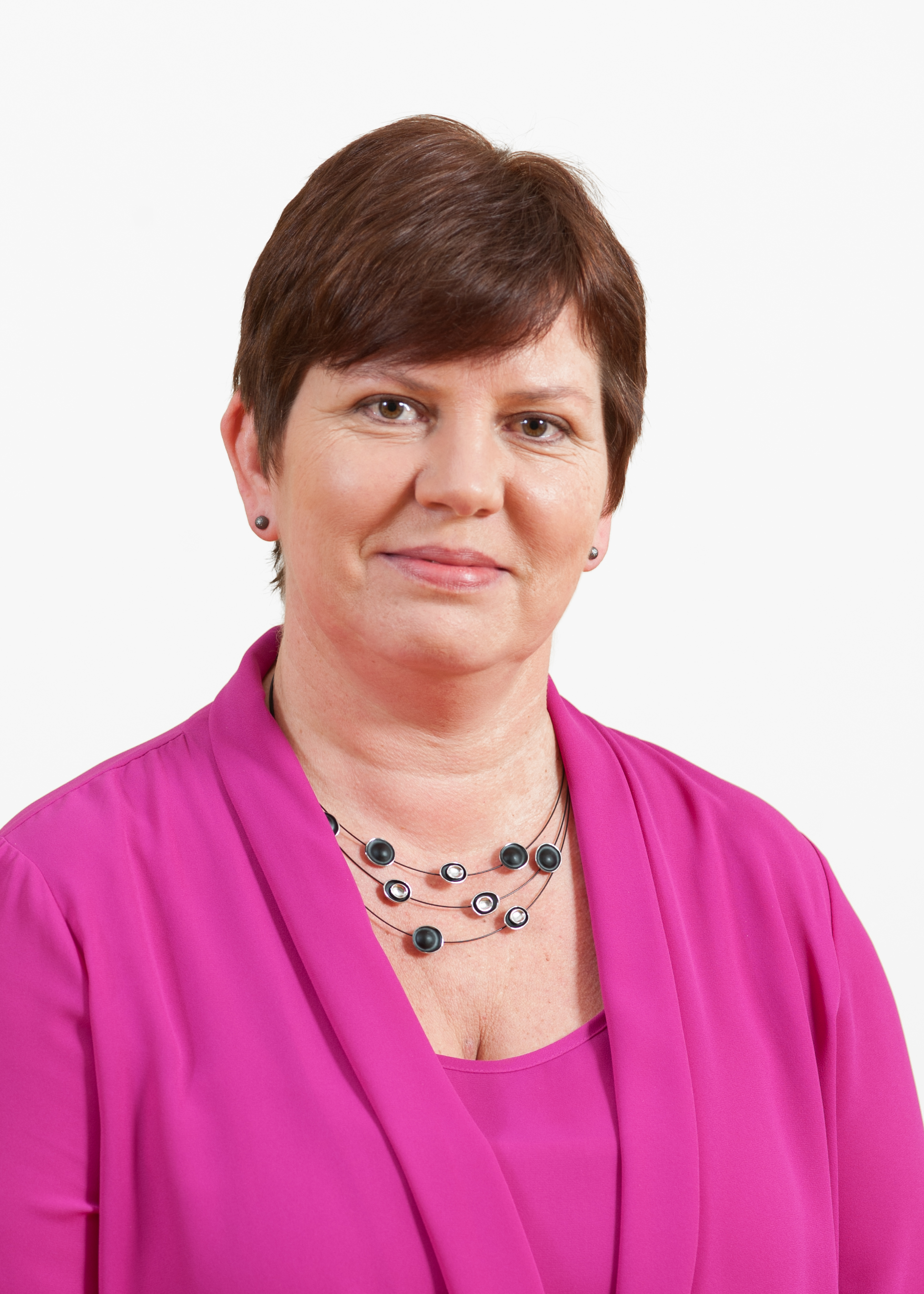
Terje Trei

Terje Trei (born 1 May 1967 in Põltsamaa, Jõgeva County) is an Estonian politician. She has been a member of the XI, XII and XIII Riigikogu.

In 2000 she graduated from Estonian Entrepreneurship University of Applied Sciences specializing in business and marketing management.

Since 2002 she has been a member of the Estonian Reform Party.
