= Aivar Sõerd =

Estonian politician and civil servant

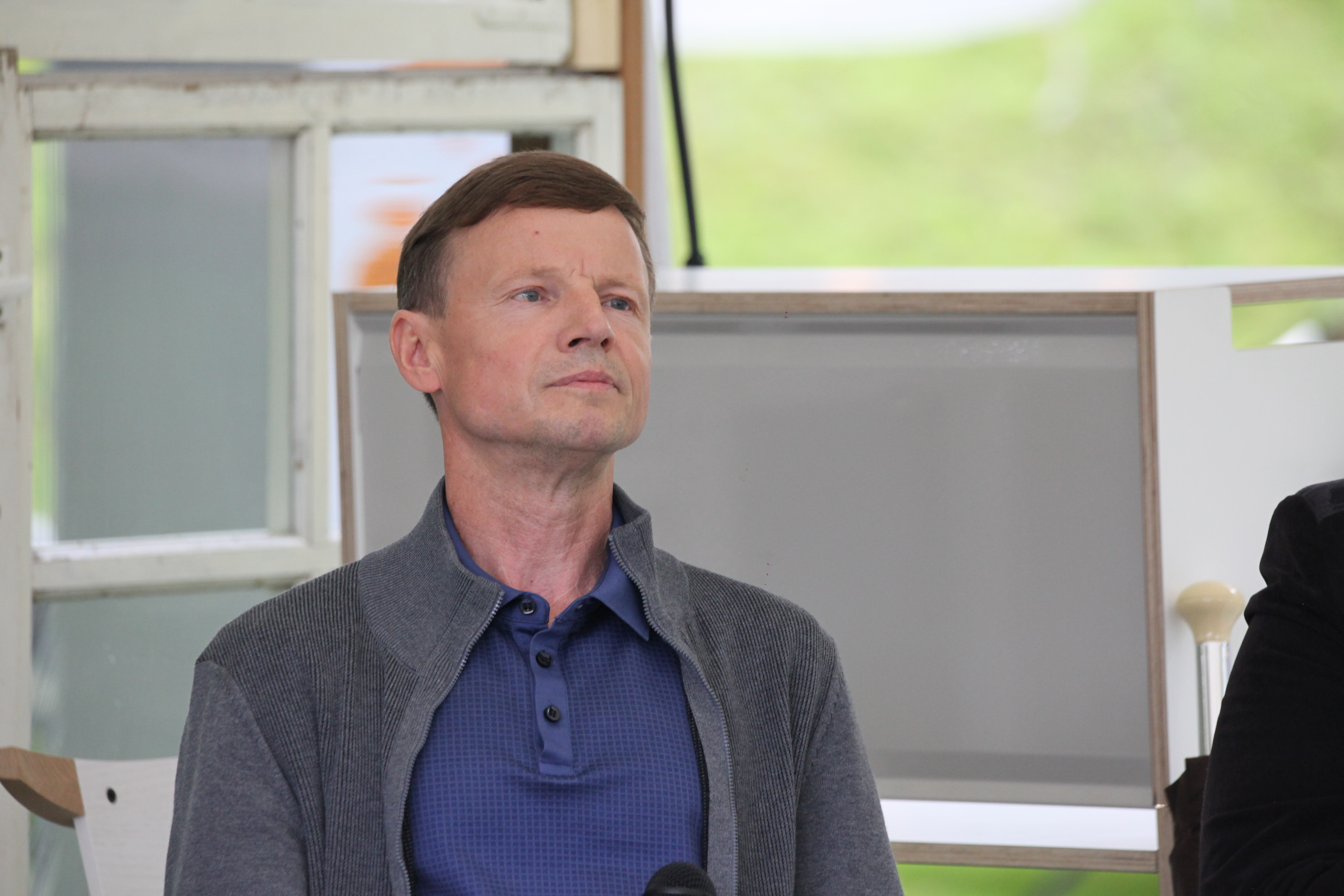
Aivar Sõerd at the Opinion Festival 2021 in Paide, Estonia

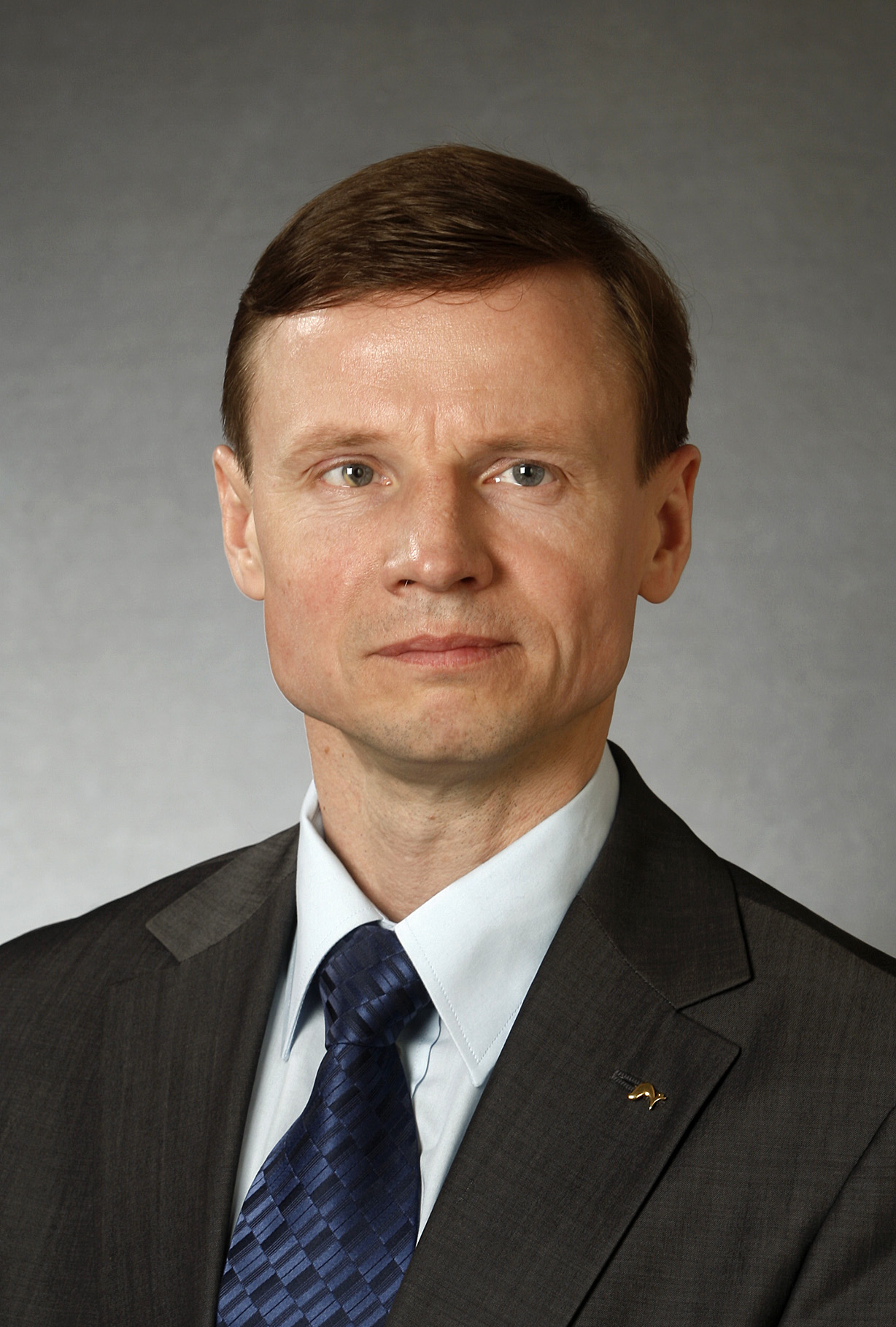
Aivar Sõerd in 2011

Aivar Sõerd (born 22 November 1964 in Haapsalu) is an Estonian politician and civil servant. He is a member of the Estonian Reform Party.

He has been a member of the XII, XIII and XIV Riigikogu.
