= Helmut Hallemaa =

Estonian politician (born 1954)

Helmut Hallemaa (born 30 June 1954 in Valga) is an Estonian politician. He was a member of XIII Riigikogu.

He is a member of Estonian Centre Party.
