= Reili Rand =

Estonian politician (born 1991)

Member of XIV Riigikogu

Personal details
- Born: March 19, 1991 (age 35) Kärdla, Estonia
- Party: SDE
- Education: Tartu University
- Occupation: Politician

Reili Rand (born 19 March 1991) is an Estonian politician. She is a member of the XIV Riigikogu, representing the Social Democratic Party. Formerly, she was the mayor of Hiiumaa parish from 2015 to 2017.

She was born in Kärdla. In 2014, she graduated from Tartu University.

Rand led the Hiiu parish from 2015 to 2017.
