= Jüri Morozov =

Estonian politician (born 1958)

Jüri Morozov (born 10 September 1958 in Otepää) is an Estonian politician. He was a member of XII Riigikogu.

He has been a member of Estonian Social Democratic Party.
