= Peeter Ernits =

Estonian zoologist, journalist and politician

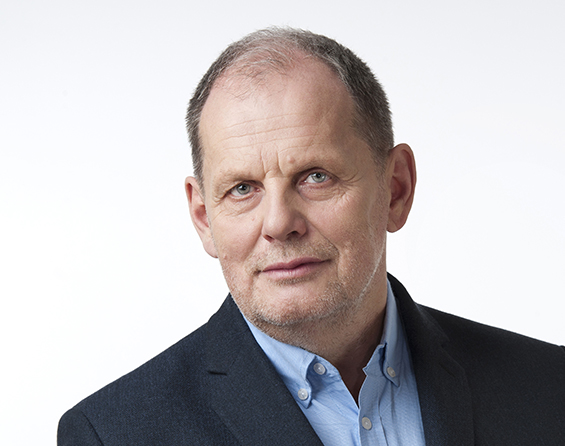
- Born: 11 June 1953 (age 73); Tallinn, then part of Estonian SSR, Soviet Union
- Education: University of Tartu
- Occupations: Zoologist, journalist, politician.
- Known for: Member of XIII and XIV Riigikogu, Estonian Museum of Natural History (1980-1988)

Peeter Ernits (born 11 June 1953 in Tallinn) is an Estonian zoologist, journalist and politician. He has been a member of XIII and XIV Riigikogu.

In 1976 he graduated from the University of Tartu with a degree in genetics.

From 1980 to 1988 he was the director of the Estonian Museum of Natural History. Between 1998 and 2002 he was chief editor of the magazine Luup. From 2004 to 2007 he was chief editor of the newspaper Maaleht.

From 2015 to 2018 he was a member of the Estonian Centre Party, switching to the Estonian Conservative People's Party in 2018. He quit the party around 2023 and joined the splinter party Estonian Nationalists and Conservatives. He later quit the party in December 2024 together with Henn Põlluaas and Ants Frosch, citing internal conflicts and dissatisfaction with the party's direction, including a lack of internal democracy.

== Selected works ==
- Ernits, Peeter (2003). Mõned mu naabrid (in Estonian). Varrak. ISBN 978-9985-3-0714-4
- Ernits, Peeter (2005). Kivialused ja teised. Tallinn: Maalehe Raamat. ISBN 9985-64-277-5
- Ernits, Peeter (2012). 101 Eesti looma (in Estonian). Varrak. ISBN 978-9985-3-2486-8
- Ernits, Peeter (2013). Jäljeaabits. Tallinn: Cum Laude. ISBN 978-9949-9352-3-9
