= Oudekki Loone =

Estonian politician (born 1979)

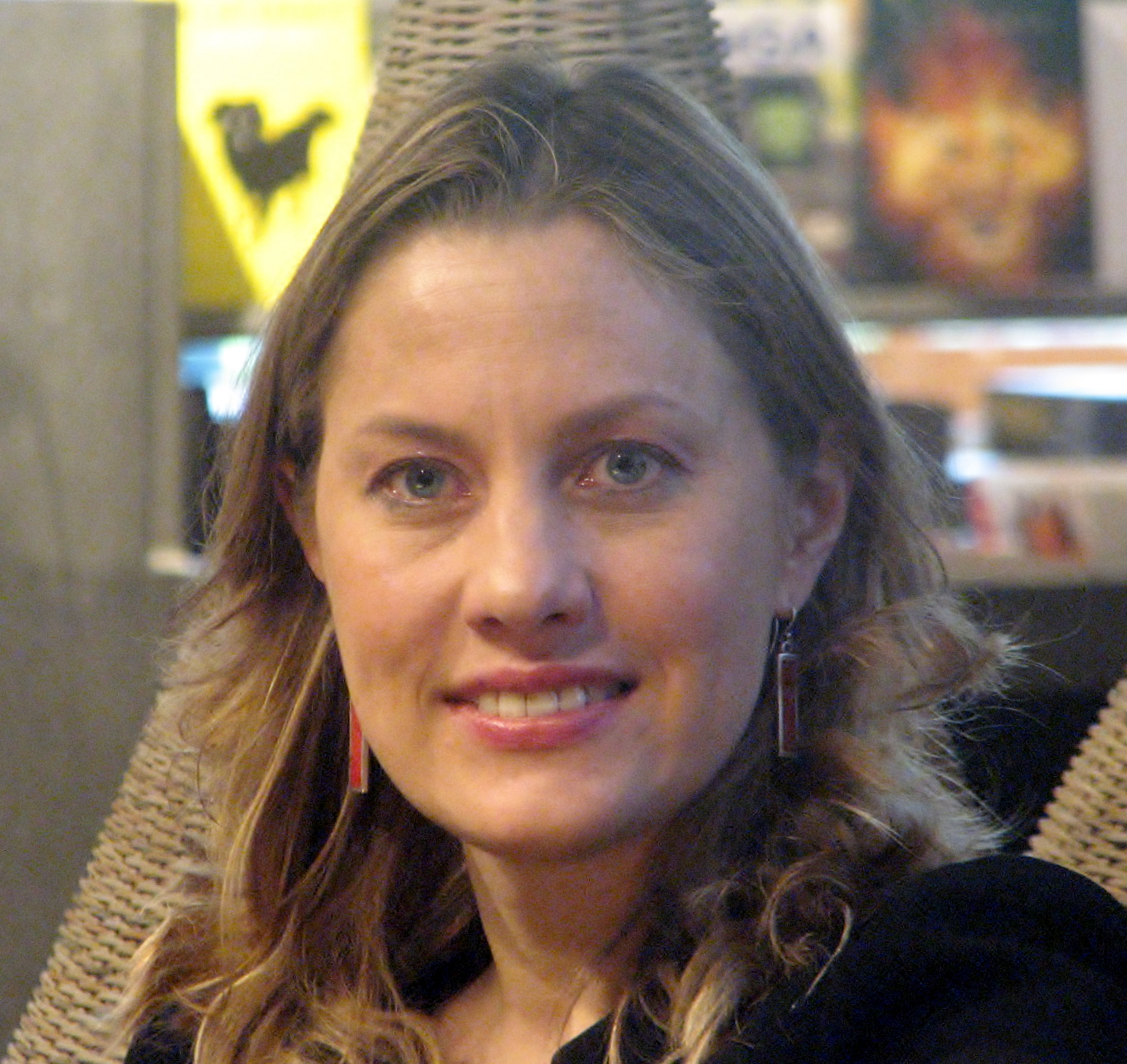
Oudekki Loone

Kerstin-Oudekki Loone (born 5 February 1979 in Tartu) is an Estonian politician and political scientist. She was a member of XIII and XIV Riigikogu.

In 2003, she graduated from Tartu University with specialities in mathematics and philosophy. In 2005 she graduated from Tallinn University with a degree in political sciences.

In 2007, she was a short-term observer of the OSCE Election Observation Mission, taking place in Kyrgyzstan.

Since 2013, she has a member of the Estonian Centre Party, serving as its Secretary General in 2016.

In January 2022 she nominated Julian Assange for the Nobel Peace Prize.
