= Anti Haugas =

Estonian politician and entrepreneur (born 1992)

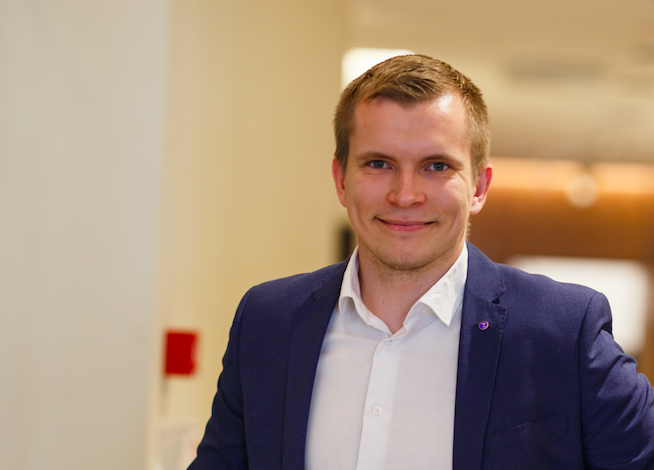

Member of the XV Riigikogu

Personal details
- Born: 10 October 1992 (age 33) Võru, Estonia
- Party: Estonian Reform Party
- Education: Tallinn University of Technology
- Occupation: Politician

Anti Haugas (10 October 1992) is an Estonian politician and entrepreneur. He is a member of the XV Riigikogu and has been a member of the Estonian Reform Party since 2011.

== Biography ==
Haugas was born in Võru. He completed his basic education with honours at Võru Kesklinna Kool and graduated from Võru Kreutzwald Gymnasium in 2012, where he was part of the special class for mathematics and English. In 2021, he graduated from the School of Economics at Tallinn University of Technology with a degree in administrative management.

Haugas is the chairman of the Reform Party's Võru district. He has been a member of the Võru City Council since 2017 and has served as its chairman since 2021. Previously, he held positions as the foreign secretary (2013–2014) and secretary-general (2014–2017) of the Estonian Reform Party Youth Organisation.

In the 2015 Riigikogu elections, Haugas ran as a candidate for the Estonian Reform Party in the Võru, Valga, and Põlva counties and received 186 votes.

During the 2017 local government elections, he was the Estonian Reform Party's candidate for the position of mayor in Võru. He received 239 votes, securing the second-highest result in the city.

Haugas is a product of the Võru Sports School's volleyball department and has been coached by Urmas Tali and Aksel Saal. He has also been active as an auxiliary police officer and, in 2018, he and Aigar Kalnapenkis achieved second place in the Southern Prefecture's auxiliary police officers' professional competition.
