= Ants Frosch =

Estonian diplomat

Ants Frosch (born 20 August 1959) is an Estonian politician, diplomat and former intelligence officer. From 2009 to 2012, he was a member of the Estonian Reform Party. In 2023, he was elected as a member of XV Riigikogu, representing the Conservative People's Party of Estonia. Later, from 2023 to 2024, he was a member of the Estonian Nationalists and Conservatives party.
