= Deniss Boroditš =

Estonian politician (born 1979)

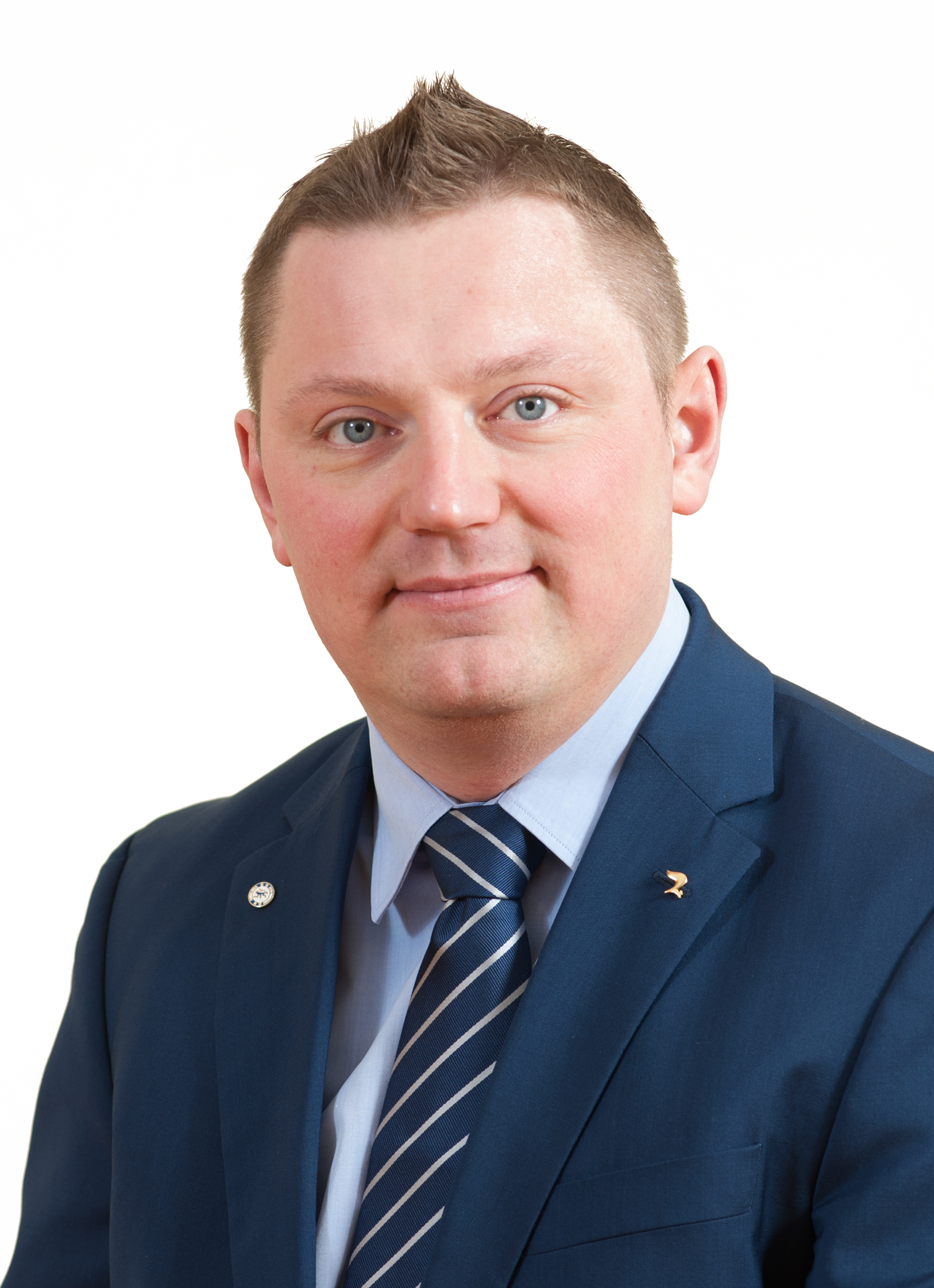
Deniss Boroditš

Deniss Boroditš (born 1 November 1979 in Tallinn) is a Chairman of the Board of TLT (AS Tallinna Linnatransport), a company operating Tallinn’s city public transport fleet (bus, tram, trolley).

He was a member of the XII and XIII Riigikogu between April 2011 and July 2018 (7 years 4 months). He served as a member of the Economic Affairs Committee, as well as Chairman of the Transit and Logistics group.

In 2001 he graduated from Concordia International University Estonia, with a degree in law.

From 2007 to 2011 he was the deputy mayor of Tallinn.

From 2004 to 2012 he was a member of Estonian Centre Party. Since 2013 he is a member of Estonian Reform Party.

Since May 2019 he has served as the Honorary Consul of the Republic of Kazakhstan in Estonia.
