= Eero Merilind =

Estonian physician and politician

Member of the XV Riigikogu
- Incumbent
- Assumed office 5 April 2023

Personal details
- Born: April 20, 1971 (age 55) Tallinn, then part of Estonian SSR, Soviet Union
- Party: Estonian Reform Party
- Education: University of Tartu
- Occupation: Politician, physician

Eero Merilind (born 20 April 1971) is an Estonian physician and politician, member of the XV Riigikogu (Parliament of Estonia).

== Biography ==
Merilind graduated from Kadriorg German Gymnasium (former Tallinn 42nd Secondary School) in 1987 and from the University of Tartu in 1995 with a degree in medicine. He completed his general internship at the Faculty of Medicine in 1995–1997, specialised as a general practitioner in 1997–2000 and completed his doctoral studies in 2008–2016. In 2016, he defended his Doctor of Philosophy (Medicine).

=== Political career ===
He has been a member of the Estonian Reform Party since 2004.

In the 2011 Riigikogu elections, he received 504 votes in constituency 3 (Tallinn, Mustamäe and Nõmme districts).

In the 2015 Riigikogu elections, he received 295 votes in the same constituency.

In the 2019 elections to the Riigikogu, he received 258 votes in the same constituency. In the same constituency, he received 258 votes.

In the 2023 Riigikogu elections, he received 868 votes in constituency 3. He entered the Riigikogu as a deputy member of Urmas Paet.

He has been a member of the Tallinn City Council from 2009 to 2013, 2019–2021 and 2022.
