= Kalle Grünthal =

Estonian politician

Member of XIV Riigikogu
- In office 2002–2005

Member of Paide City Council

Personal details
- Born: February 24, 1960 (age 66) Türi, Estonia
- Party: Conservative People's Party of Estonia (2017–2023)
- Education: University of Tartu
- Occupation: Politician

Kalle Grünthal (born 24 February 1960 in Türi) is an Estonian politician. He has been a member of the XIV Riigikogu.

From 2001 to 2004 he studied law at the University of Tartu.

Between 2002 and 2005 he was a member of Paide City Council.

From 2017 to 2023 he was a member of the Estonian Conservative People's Party.
