= Urbo Vaarmann =

Estonian politician (born 1977)

Urbo Vaarmann (born 6 January 1977 in Rakvere) is an Estonian politician. He was a member of XII Riigikogu.

He has been a member of Estonian Centre Party.
