= Timo Suslov =

Estonian politician

Member of Riigikogu
- Incumbent
- Assumed office 4 April 2019

Personal details
- Born: July 2, 1981 (age 43); Tallinn, Estonia
- Education: Estonian Academy of Security Sciences
- Occupation: Politician, police officer

Timo Suslov (born 2 July 1981) is an Estonian politician and police officer. He is a member of XIV Riigikogu.

He was born in Tallinn. In 2004, he graduated from Estonian Academy of Security Sciences.

He ran for the Riigikogu in the 2023 elections, received 1033 votes in constituency No 4 (Harju and Raplamaa) and was elected.

His twin brother Tanel Suslov is a basketball official (referee).
