= Etti Kagarov =

Estonian politician (born 1956)

Etti Kagarov (born 28 January 1956 in Kohtla-Järve) is an Estonian politician. She was a member of XII and XIII Riigikogu.

She was a member of the People's Union of Estonia from 2000 until 2010, and has been a member of Estonian Social Democratic Party since 2011. From 2003 until 2014, she was the Mayor of Kohtla Parish, Since 2018, she has been the director of the Estonian Mining Museum.
