= Toomas Väinaste =

Estonian politician (born 1950)

Toomas Väinaste (born 24 January 1950 in Soonuka) is an Estonian politician. He was a member of the XIII Riigikogu.

He is a member of the Estonian Centre Party.
