= Aivar Rosenberg =

Estonian politician

Aivar Rosenberg (born 14 September 1962 in Tartu) is an Estonian politician. He was a member of XII Riigikogu.

He has been a member of Estonian Reform Party.

In 2006, he was awarded with Order of the White Star, V class.
