= Remo Holsmer =

Estonian basketball player and politician (born 1980)

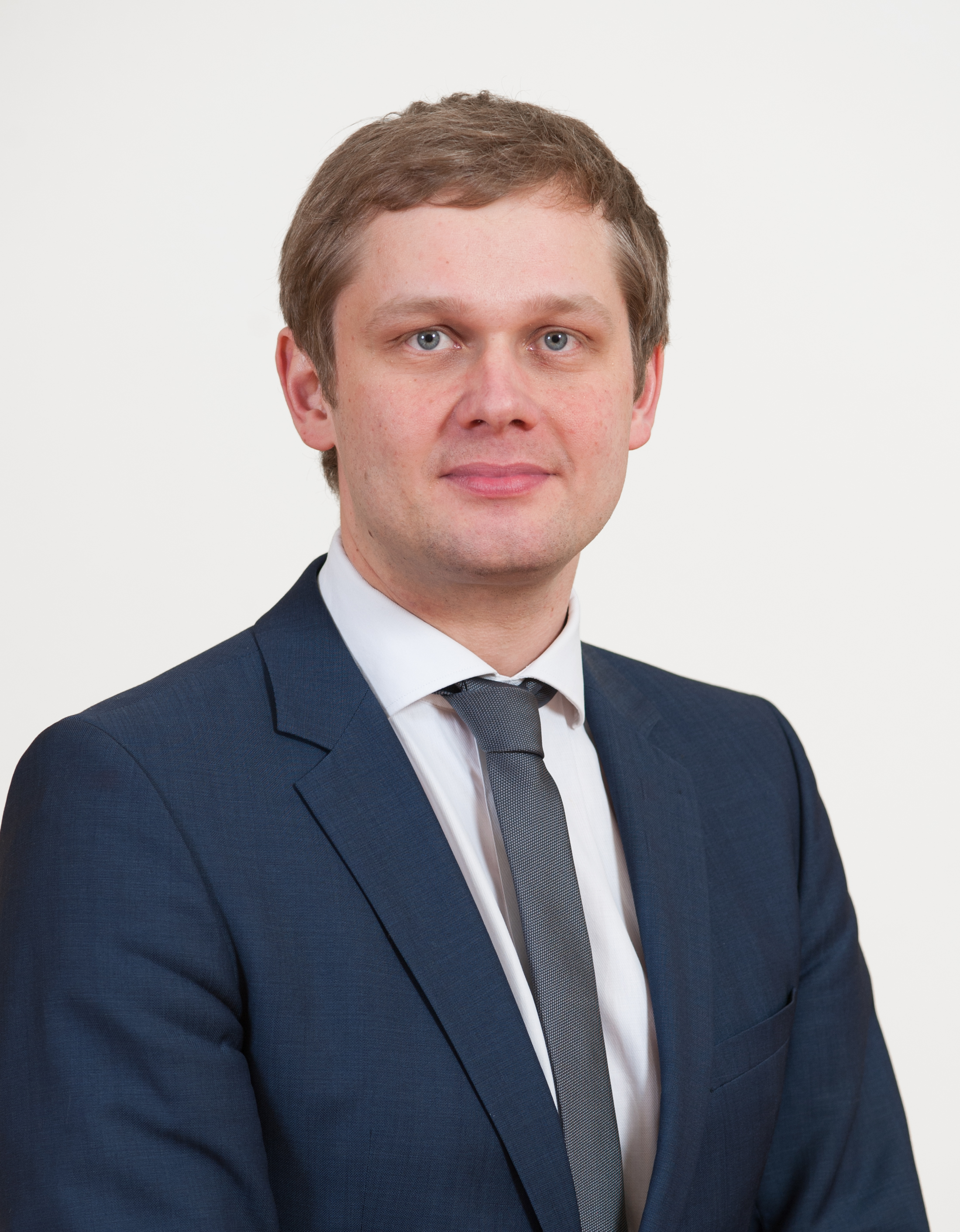
Remo Holsmer in 2015

Remo Holsmer (born 20 September 1980, Tallinn) is an Estonian former basketball player and politician who represented the Estonian Reform Party in the Riigikogu from 2011 to 2018. He was a player for BC Kalev, and later, was the manager of the team from 2005 to 2009.

== Education ==
Holsmer graduated from Tallinn Reaalkooli in 1998 and a bachelor's degree in Public Administration from the Tallinn University of Technology. In the same year, he graduated from the University of Tartu with a Master's degree in Public Administration.

== Political career ==
Since 2000, Holsmer has been a member of the Estonian Reform Party. From 2005 to 2011, he was a member of the Tallinn City Council.

Holsmer has worked as advisor to the Deputy Mayor of Tallinn from 2003 to 2004, as well as the elder of Kristiine from 2004 to 2005, an adviser to the Prime minister of Estonia from 2005 to 2008, and as an adviser to the Reform Party from 2009 to 2011. From 2011 to 2018, he was a member of the Riigikogu and vice-chairman of the Reform Party during that time.

He is the chairman of the supervisory board of the Port of Tallinn, as well as a member of the supervisory board of Elron.

Holsmer, during his time in the Riigikogu, was a part of numerous committees concerning foreign relations with a number of countries, including Finland, China, Turkey, the United Kingdom, Sweden, Kazakhstan, the United States, and Spain. He was also a member of the Sport and Fitness Support Group and the Finance Committee.

Holsmer resigned from the Riigikogu in April 2018 to work in the private sector for Cramo Estonia, while still retaining some of his political positions for the time being.
