= Kalvi Kõva =

Estonian politician (born 1974)

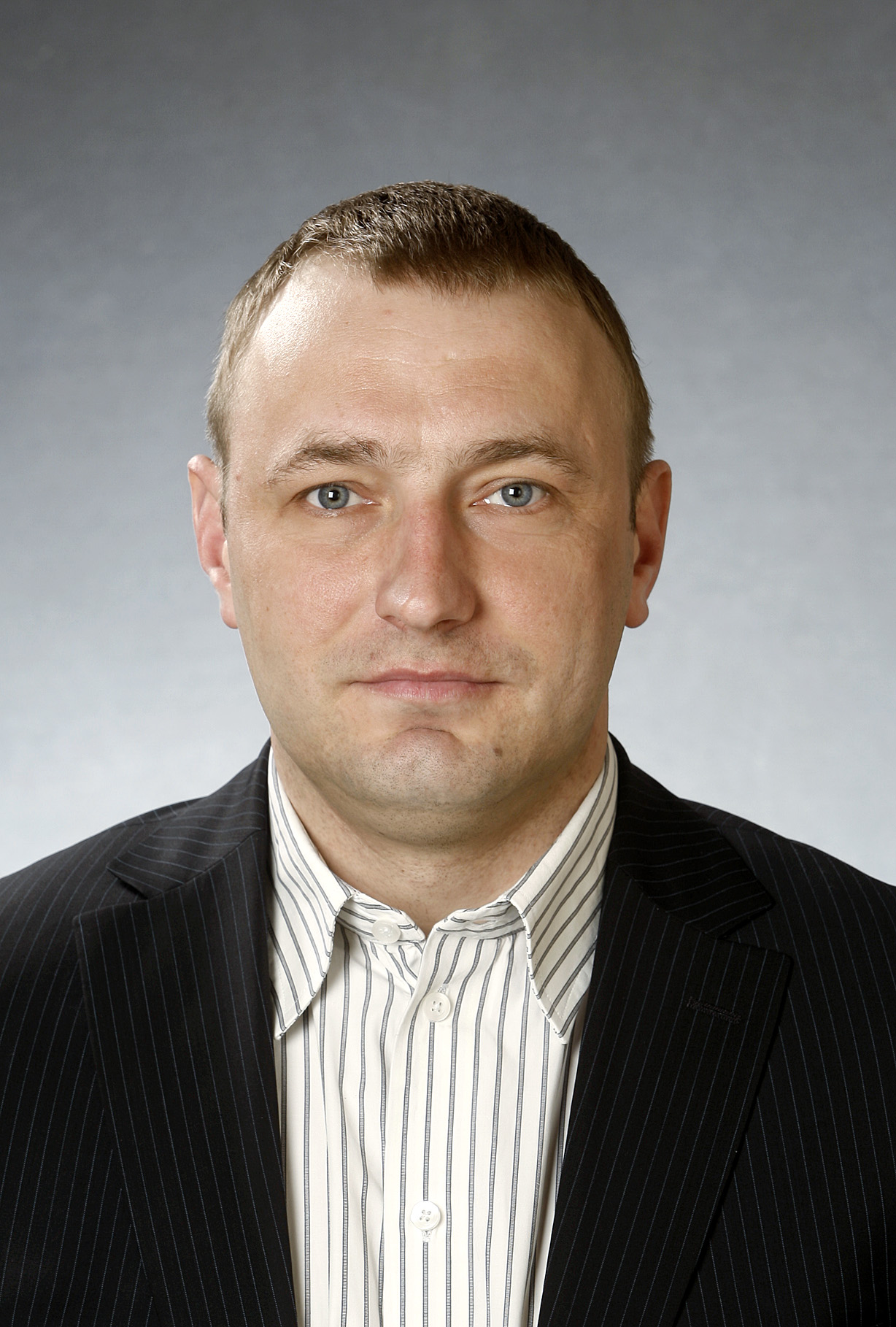
Kalvi Kõva

Kalvi Kõva (born on 16 November 1974 Rõuge Parish, Võru County) is an Estonian politician. He has been a member of the XI, XII, XIII, and XIV Riigikogu. Since 2001 he belongs to Social Democratic Party.

Between 1999 and 2007 he was an elder of Rõuge Parish (Estonian: Rõuge vallavanem).

Since 2018 he has served as secretary general of Social Democratic Party.
