= Õnne Pillak =

Estonian politician (born 1983)

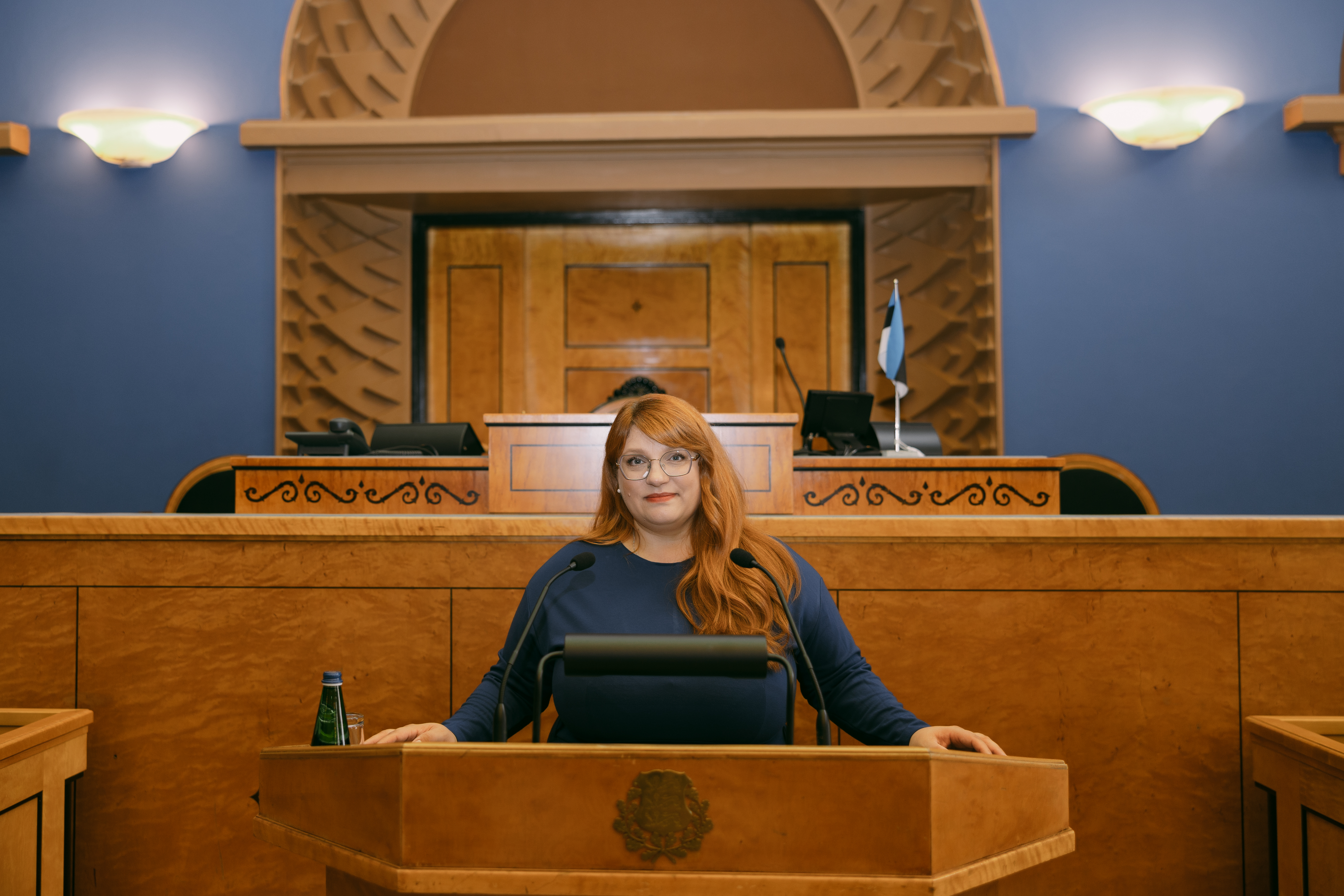
- Pillak in 2023

Member of the Riigikogu
- Incumbent
- Assumed office 27 January 2021

Member of the Tallinn City Council
- Incumbent
- Assumed office 2009

Personal details
- Born: February 23, 1983 (age 43) Tallinn, Estonia
- Party: Estonian Reform Party (2001–present)
- Children: 2
- Education: Tallinn Nõmme Gymnasium; Estonian Business School; Tallinn University of Technology Kuressaare College

Õnne Pillak (born 23 February 1983) is an Estonian politician, representing the Estonian Reform Party since 2001. On 27 January 2021, she became a member of the XIV Riigikogu.

== Education and career ==
Õnne Pillak was born in Tallinn. She graduated from Tallinn Nõmme Gymnasium in 2002. From 2002 to 2006, she studied public administration at the Estonian Business School (EBS). From 2007 to 2013, she studied small business at Tallinn University of Technology Kuressaare College. From 2014, she returned to the Estonian Business School to study entrepreneurship and business management.

From 2004 until 2005, she was a consultant to the Nõmme District Government. In 2005, she was an advisor to the Deputy Mayor of Tallinn City Government. In the years 2006 until 2011, she was the advisor and head of the secretariat of the Riigikogu Reform Party faction. From 2011 until 2015, she was an advisor to the Ministry of Culture. From 2018 until 2021, she was the assistant and adviser to the vice-chairman of the Riigikogu.

Õnne Pillak with her children in 2021

Pillak has been a member of the Tallinn City Council since 2009. On 27 January 2021, she became a member of XIV Riigikogu, representing the Reform Party.

== Personal life ==
Pillak is married and a mother of twins. She resides in Tallinn.
