= 15th Riigikogu =

Parliament of Estonia 2023–present

←	14th Riigikogu

Overview
- Legislative body: Riigikogu
- Jurisdiction: Estonia
- Meeting place: Toompea Castle, Tallinn
- Term: 10 April 2023 –
- Election: 5 March 2023
- Website: riigikogu.ee
- Members: 101

The 15th Riigikogu is the fifteenth legislature of the Estonian Parliament (Riigikogu). The legislature was elected after the 2023 election.

== Election results ==
Party	Votes	%	+/–	Seats	+/–
Estonian Reform Party	190,632	31.24	+2.31	37	+3
Conservative People's Party of Estonia	97,966	16.05	−1.71	17	−2
Estonian Centre Party	93,254	15.28	−7.82	16	−10
Estonia 200	81,329	13.33	+8.97	14	+14
Social Democratic Party	56,584	9.27	−0.56	9	−1
Isamaa	50,118	8.21	−3.23	8	−4
Estonian United Left Party	14,605	2.39	+2.30	0	0
Parempoolsed	14,037	2.30	New	0	New
Estonian Greens	5,886	0.96	−0.86	0	0
Independents	5,888	0.96	+0.68	0	0
Total	610,299	100.00	–	101	0
Valid votes	610,299	99.43			
Invalid/blank votes	3,502	0.57			
Total votes	613,801	100.00			
Registered voters/turnout	966,129	63.53			
Source: National Electoral Committee

== Officers ==
Speaker of the Riigikogu: Lauri Hussar.
