= Members of the 15th Riigikogu =

This is a list of the members of the 15th Riigikogu, the unicameral parliament of Estonia, following the 2023 election.

== Election results ==
Party	Votes	%	Seats	+/–
Estonian Reform Party	190,659	31.24	37	+3
Conservative People's Party of Estonia	97,959	16.05	17	−2
Estonian Centre Party	93,243	15.28	16	−10
Estonia 200	81,347	13.33	14	+14
Social Democratic Party	56,578	9.27	9	−1
Isamaa	50,114	8.21	8	−4
Estonian United Left Party–Together	14,607	2.39	0	0
Parempoolsed	14,035	2.30	0	New
Estonian Greens	5,889	0.96	0	0
Independents	5,887	0.96	0	0
Total	610,318	100.00	101	0
Valid votes	610,318	99.43		
Invalid/blank votes	3,494	0.57		
Total votes	613,812	100.00		
Registered voters/turnout	966,129	63.53		
Source: National Electoral Committee

== Lists ==
=== By party ===
==== Estonian Reform Party (37) ====
Name	Constituency
Annely Akkermann	Pärnu County
Yoko Alender	Tartu City
Anti Haugas	Võru County, Valga County, and Põlva County
Karmen Joller	Tallinn – Kesklinn, Lasnamäe, and Pirita
Mario Kadastik	Harju County and Rapla County
Kaja Kallas	Harju County and Rapla County
Siim Kallas	Tallinn – Kesklinn, Lasnamäe, and Pirita
Erkki Keldo	Jõgeva County and Tartu County
Liina Kersna	Võru County, Valga County, and Põlva County
Meelis Kiili	Ida-Viru County
Signe Kivi	Tartu City
Toomas Kivimägi	Pärnu County
Urmas Klaas	Tartu City
Eerik-Niiles Kross	Võru County, Valga County, and Põlva County
Urmas Kruuse	Jõgeva County and Tartu County
Ants Laaneots	Tartu City
Kalle Laanet	Hiiu County, Lääne County, and Saare County
Maris Lauri	Tallinn – Mustamäe and Nõmme
Jürgen Ligi	Järva County and Viljandi County
Kristen Michal	Tallinn – Haabersti, Põhja-Tallinn, and Kristiine
Marko Mihkelson	Harju County and Rapla County
Urmas Paet	Tallinn – Mustamäe and Nõmme
Pärtel-Peeter Pere	Tallinn – Haabersti, Põhja-Tallinn, and Kristiine
Hanno Pevkur	Lääne-Viru County
Heidy Purga	Tallinn – Kesklinn, Lasnamäe, and Pirita
Signe Riisalo	Tallinn – Haabersti, Põhja-Tallinn, and Kristiine
Luisa Rõivas	Jõgeva County and Tartu County
Maido Ruusmann	Võru County, Valga County, and Põlva County
Andrus Seeme	Võru County, Valga County, and Põlva County
Pipi-Liis Siemann	Järva County and Viljandi County
Kristina Šmigun-Vähi	Harju County and Rapla County
Aivar Sõerd	Harju County and Rapla County
Timo Suslov	Harju County and Rapla County
Andres Sutt	Tallinn – Kesklinn, Lasnamäe, and Pirita
Vilja Toomast	Tallinn – Mustamäe and Nõmme
Kristo Enn Vaga	Tallinn – Haabersti, Põhja-Tallinn, and Kristiine
Mart Võrklaev	Harju County and Rapla County

==== Conservative People's Party (17) ====
Name	Constituency
Arvo Aller	Ida-Viru County
Rain Epler	Võru County, Valga County, and Põlva County
Ants Frosch	Võru County, Valga County, and Põlva County
Helle-Moonika Helme	Hiiu County, Lääne County, and Saare County
Mart Helme	Pärnu County
Martin Helme	Tallinn – Mustamäe and Nõmme
Kert Kingo	Jõgeva County and Tartu County
Rene Kokk	Harju County and Rapla County
Leo Kunnas	Tallinn – Kesklinn, Lasnamäe, and Pirita
Alar Laneman	Pärnu County
Jaak Madison	Järva County and Viljandi County
Siim Pohlak	Harju County and Rapla County
Henn Põlluaas	Harju County and Rapla County
Anti Poolamets	Lääne-Viru County
Evelin Poolamets	Lääne-Viru County
Jaak Valge	Tartu City
Varro Vooglaid	Tallinn – Haabersti, Põhja-Tallinn, and Kristiine

==== Estonian Centre Party (16) ====
Name	Constituency
Jaak Aab	Järva County and Viljandi County
Vadim Belobrovtsev	Tallinn – Haabersti, Põhja-Tallinn, and Kristiine
Andre Hanimägi	Tallinn – Haabersti, Põhja-Tallinn, and Kristiine
Maria Jufereva-Skuratovski	Tallinn – Kesklinn, Lasnamäe, and Pirita
Jaanus Karilaid	Hiiu County, Lääne County, and Saare County
Ester Karuse	Võru County, Valga County, and Põlva County
Tanel Kiik	Tallinn – Haabersti, Põhja-Tallinn, and Kristiine
Mihhail Kõlvart	Tallinn – Kesklinn, Lasnamäe, and Pirita
Andrei Korobeinik	Pärnu County
Anastassia Kovalenko-Kõlvart	Tallinn – Haabersti, Põhja-Tallinn, and Kristiine
Lauri Laats	Tallinn – Mustamäe and Nõmme
Tõnis Mölder	Tallinn – Kesklinn, Lasnamäe, and Pirita
Jüri Ratas	Harju County and Rapla County
Vladimir Svet (renounced to become a member of Riigikogu)	Tallinn – Kesklinn, Lasnamäe, and Pirita
Yana Toom	Ida-Viru County
Aleksandr Tšaplõgin	Tallinn – Kesklinn, Lasnamäe, and Pirita

==== Estonia 200 (14) ====
Name	Constituency
Lauri Hussar	Harju County and Rapla County
Kristina Kallas	Tartu City
Johanna-Maria Lehtme	Tallinn – Haabersti, Põhja-Tallinn, and Kristiine
Irja Lutsar	Jõgeva County and Tartu County
Marek Reinaas	Tallinn – Kesklinn, Lasnamäe, and Pirita
Grigore-Kalev Stoicescu	Hiiu County, Lääne County, and Saare County
Liisa-Ly Pakosta	Tallinn – Kesklinn, Lasnamäe, and Pirita
Kadri Tali	Pärnu County
Peeter Tali	Pärnu County
Tarmo Tamm	Lääne-Viru County
Igor Taro	Võru County, Valga County, and Põlva County
Hendrik Johannes Terras	Tallinn – Haabersti, Põhja-Tallinn, and Kristiine
Margus Tsahkna	Tallinn – Mustamäe and Nõmme
Toomas Uibo	Harju County and Rapla County

==== Social Democratic Party (9) ====
Name	Constituency
Anti Allas	Võru County, Valga County, and Põlva County
Raimond Kaljulaid	Tallinn – Haabersti, Põhja-Tallinn, and Kristiine
Marina Kaljurand	Harju County and Rapla County
Madis Kallas	Hiiu County, Lääne County, and Saare County
Helmen Kütt	Järva County and Viljandi County
Lauri Läänemets	Järva County and Viljandi County
Jevgeni Ossinovski	Tallinn – Kesklinn, Lasnamäe, and Pirita
Heljo Pikhof	Tartu City
Riina Sikkut	Tallinn – Mustamäe and Nõmme

==== Isamaa (8) ====
Name	Constituency
Aivar Kokk	Jõgeva County and Tartu County
Tõnis Lukas	Tartu City
Andres Metsoja	Pärnu County
Urmas Reinsalu	Harju County and Rapla County
Helir-Valdor Seeder	Järva County and Viljandi County
Priit Sibul	Võru County, Valga County, and Põlva County
Riina Solman	Tallinn – Haabersti, Põhja-Tallinn, and Kristiine
Riho Terras	Tallinn – Kesklinn, Lasnamäe, and Pirita

=== By votes ===
	Name	Votes	Party
1	Kaja Kallas	31,816	Reform
2	Mihhail Kõlvart	14,592	Centre
3	Kristen Michal	9,214	Reform
4	Urmas Paet	9,154	Reform
5	Urmas Klaas	8,065	Reform
6	Siim Kallas	7,393	Reform
7	Jüri Ratas	7,672	Centre
8	Hanno Pevkur	6,567	Reform
9	Jürgen Ligi	5,797	Reform
