= Riigikogu electoral district no. 11 =

Electoral district of Estonia

Electoral district no. 11
- Valimisringkond nr 11
- Electoral District for the Riigikogu
- Location of Electoral district no. 11 within Estonia
- County: Põlva; Valga; Võru
- Population: 88,266 (2020)
- Electorate: 70,706 (2019)

Current Electoral District
- Created: 1992
- Seats: List: 8 (2019–present); 9 (2003–2019); 10 (1999–2003); 11 (1992–1999)
- Member of the Riigikogu: List: Merry Aart (EKRE); Uno Kaskpeit (EKRE); Liina Kersna (RE); Kalvi Kõva (SDE); Ivari Padar (SDE); Hanno Pevkur (RE); Andrus Seeme (RE); Priit Sibul (I); Tarmo Tamm (K)

Electoral district no. 11 (Estonian: Valimisringkond nr 11) is one of the 12 multi-member electoral districts of the Riigikogu, the national legislature of Estonia. The district was established in 1992 when the Riigikogu was re-established following Estonia's independence from the Soviet Union. It was renamed electoral district no. 10 in 1995 following the re-organisation of electoral districts but reverted to electoral district no. 11 in 2003. It is conterminous with the counties of Põlva, Valga and Võru. The district currently elects eight of the 101 members of the Riigikogu using the open party-list proportional representation electoral system. At the 2019 parliamentary election it had 70,706 registered electors.

== Electoral system ==
Electoral district no. 11 currently elects eight of the 101 members of the Riigikogu using the open party-list proportional representation electoral system. The allocation of seats is carried out in three stages. In the first stage, any individual candidate, regardless of whether they are a party or independent candidate, who receives more votes than the district's simple quota (Hare quota: valid votes in district/number of seats allocated to district) is elected via a personal mandate. In the second stage, district mandates are allocated to parties by dividing their district votes by the district's simple quota. Only parties that reach the 5% national threshold compete for district mandates and any personal mandates won by the party are subtracted from the party's district mandates. Prior to 2003 if a party's surplus/remainder votes was equal to or greater than 75% of the district's simple quota it received one additional district mandate. Any unallocated district seats are added to a national pool of compensatory seats. In the final stage, compensatory mandates are calculated based on the national vote and using a modified D'Hondt method. Only parties that reach the 5% national threshold compete for compensatory seats and any personal and district mandates won by the party are subtracted from the party's compensatory mandates. Though calculated nationally, compensatory mandates are allocated at the district level.

=== Seats ===
Seats allocated to electoral district no. 11 by the National Electoral Committee of Estonia at each election was as follows:

- 2023 - 8
- 2019 - 8
- 2015 - 9
- 2011 - 9
- 2007 - 9
- 2003 - 9
- 1999 - 10
- 1995 - 11
- 1992 - 11

== Election results ==
=== Summary ===
Election	Left EÜVP/EVP/ESDTP/Õ/V			Constitution K/EÜRP/MKOE			Social Democrats SDE/RM/M			Greens EER/NJ/R			Centre K/R			Reform RE			Isamaa I/IRL/I/I\ERSP/I			Conservative People's EKRE/ERL/EME/KMÜ		
Election	Votes	%	Seats	Votes	%	Seats	Votes	%	Seats	Votes	%	Seats	Votes	%	Seats	Votes	%	Seats	Votes	%	Seats	Votes	%	Seats
2023							5,476	12.33%	1	555	1.25%	0	5,949	13.40%	1	10,655	24.00%	2	3,784	8.52%	0	11,759	26.48%	2
2019							5,034	11.68%	1	440	1.02%	0	9,197	21.34%	1	10,029	23.27%	2	4,153	9.64%	1	10,644	24.70%	2
2015	40	0.09%	0				10,816	24.27%	2	291	0.65%	0	8,670	19.46%	2	11,034	24.76%	2	5,637	12.65%	1	4,275	9.59%	1
2011							11,988	25.85%	2	1,206	2.60%	0	8,575	18.49%	1	12,483	26.91%	2	9,627	20.76%	2	1,743	3.76%	0
2007	34	0.07%	0	106	0.23%	0	8,360	17.83%	1	2,439	5.20%	0	10,310	21.99%	2	11,629	24.80%	2	6,650	14.18%	1	6,523	13.91%	1
2003	155	0.34%	0	514	1.12%	0	6,893	15.00%	1				11,465	24.95%	2	5,179	11.27%	1	2,318	5.05%	0	9,425	20.51%	2
1999				695	1.52%	0	6,975	15.25%	1				12,556	27.45%	2	4,312	9.43%	0	4,546	9.94%	0	6,906	15.10%	1
1995	1,011	1.82%	0	571	1.03%	0	1,190	2.15%	0	343	0.62%	0	3,500	6.31%	0	3,699	6.67%	0	2,914	5.25%	0	22,544	40.65%	4
1992							2,331	4.89%	0	293	0.61%	0	2,586	5.42%	0				5,800	12.16%	1			

(Excludes compensatory seats)

=== Detailed ===
Party has received at least 5% of the vote nationally and is entitled to compete for district seats.

==== 2023 ====
Results of the 2023 parliamentary election held on 5 March 2023:

Party		Votes per district					Total Votes	%	Seats			
Party		Põlva	Valga	Võru	Expat- riates	Elec- tronic	Total Votes	%	Per.	Dis.	Com.	Tot.
Conservative People's Party of Estonia	EKRE	2,508	1,985	3,842	87	3,103	11,759	26.48%	0	2	0	2
Estonian Reform Party	REF	1,090	1,410	1,277	17	6,672	10,655	24.00%	0	2	3	5
Estonian Centre Party	KESK	1,217	1,437	1,148	12	2,028	5,949	13.40%	0	1	0	1
Social Democratic Party	SDE	576	472	1,613	8	2,692	5,476	12.33%	0	1	0	1
Estonia 200	EE200	675	508	837	8	2,994	5,105	11.50%	0	1	0	1
Isamaa	IE	564	574	844	10	1,707	3,784	8.52%	0	0	1	1
Parempoolsed		86	173	199	2	531	1,202	2.71%	0	0	0	0
Estonian Greens	EER	60	46	117	3	315	555	1.25%	0	0	0	0
Argo Mõttus (Independent)		21	28	16	0	39	105	0.24%	0	0	0	0
Valid votes		6,797	6,633	9,893	147	20,081	44,403	100.00%	0	7	4	11
Rejected votes		95	96	132	1	0	342	0.76%				
Total polled		6,892	6,729	10,025	148	20,081	44,745	58.71%				
Registered electors		19,359	19,549	27,517	9,789		76,214					

The following candidates were elected:

- District mandates - Anti Allas (SDE), 1,970 votes; Rain Epler (EKRE), 3,366 votes; Ants Frosch (EKRE), 2,619 votes; Ester Karuse (KESK), 1,677 votes; Liina Kersna (REF), 4,073 votes; Maido Ruusmann (REF), 1,500 votes; and Igor Taro (EE200), 3,275 votes.
- Compensatory mandates - Anti Haugas (REF), 569 votes; Eerik-Niiles Kross (REF), 1,428 votes; Andrus Seeme (REF), 723 votes; and Priit Sibul (IE), 1,420 votes.

==== 2019 ====
Results of the 2019 parliamentary election held on 3 March 2019:

Party		Votes per county					Total Votes	%	Seats			
Party		Põlva	Valga	Võru	Expat- riates	Elec- tronic	Total Votes	%	Per.	Dis.	Com.	Tot.
Conservative People's Party of Estonia	EKRE	2,261	1,715	3,295	119	3,254	10,644	24.70%	0	2	0	2
Estonian Reform Party	RE	1,401	1,612	1,813	16	5,187	10,029	23.27%	0	2	1	3
Estonian Centre Party	K	2,237	2,311	2,416	9	2,224	9,197	21.34%	0	1	1	2
Social Democratic Party	SDE	565	856	1,586	12	2,015	5,034	11.68%	0	1	1	2
Isamaa	I	679	715	931	7	1,821	4,153	9.64%	0	1	0	1
Estonia 200		327	186	439	4	953	1,909	4.43%	0	0	0	0
Estonian Biodiversity Party		93	67	257	2	486	905	2.10%	0	0	0	0
Estonian Free Party	EVA	138	92	140	0	236	606	1.41%	0	0	0	0
Estonian Greens	EER	77	40	103	1	219	440	1.02%	0	0	0	0
Üllar Kruustik (Independent)		13	35	17	0	47	112	0.26%	0	0	0	0
Tanel Häidkind (Independent)		10	13	17	0	21	61	0.14%	0	0	0	0
Valid votes		7,801	7,642	11,014	170	16,463	43,090	100.00%	0	7	3	10
Rejected votes		114	113	148	2	0	377	0.87%				
Total polled		7,915	7,755	11,162	172	16,463	43,467	61.48%				
Registered electors		20,417	20,652	29,182	455		70,706					

The following candidates were elected:

- District mandates - Merry Aart (EKRE), 1,245 votes; Uno Kaskpeit (EKRE), 3,802 votes; Liina Kersna (RE), 2,343 votes; Ivari Padar (SDE), 1,457 votes; Hanno Pevkur (RE), 3,595 votes; Priit Sibul (I), 1,406 votes; and Tarmo Tamm (K), 2,824 votes.
- Compensatory mandates - Kalvi Kõva (SDE), 605 votes; Anneli Ott (K), 1,474 votes; and Andrus Seeme (RE), 764 votes.

==== 2015 ====
Results of the 2015 parliamentary election held on 1 March 2015:

Party		Votes per county					Total Votes	%	Seats			
Party		Põlva	Valga	Võru	Expat- riates	Elec- tronic	Total Votes	%	Per.	Dis.	Com.	Tot.
Estonian Reform Party	RE	2,370	2,170	2,619	14	3,861	11,034	24.76%	0	2	0	2
Social Democratic Party	SDE	2,186	2,099	3,563	16	2,952	10,816	24.27%	0	2	0	2
Estonian Centre Party	K	2,764	2,506	2,481	7	912	8,670	19.46%	0	2	0	2
Pro Patria and Res Publica Union	IRL	1,439	1,056	1,385	14	1,743	5,637	12.65%	0	1	1	2
Conservative People's Party of Estonia	EKRE	899	970	1,400	15	991	4,275	9.59%	0	1	1	2
Estonian Free Party	EVA	616	735	648	6	1,229	3,234	7.26%	0	0	0	0
Estonian Greens	EER	65	32	87	0	107	291	0.65%	0	0	0	0
Party of People's Unity	RÜE	39	53	133	1	54	280	0.63%	0	0	0	0
Marek Ranne (Independent)		24	19	23	0	48	114	0.26%	0	0	0	0
Estonian Independence Party	EIP	34	22	36	0	19	111	0.25%	0	0	0	0
Tarmo Porroson (Independent)		12	21	10	0	16	59	0.13%	0	0	0	0
Estonian United Left Party	EÜVP	21	9	5	2	3	40	0.09%	0	0	0	0
Valid votes		10,469	9,692	12,390	75	11,935	44,561	100.00%	0	8	2	10
Rejected votes		117	128	168	0	0	413	0.92%				
Total polled		10,586	9,820	12,558	75	11,935	44,974	59.54%				
Registered electors		23,777	23,251	28,439	75		75,542					

The following candidates were elected:

- District mandates - Uno Kaskpeit (EKRE), 1,807 votes; Liina Kersna (RE), 2,387 votes; Kalvi Kõva (SDE), 2,081 votes; Heimar Lenk (K), 3,398 votes; Ivari Padar (SDE), 3,992 votes; Hanno Pevkur (RE), 3,816 votes; Priit Sibul (IRL), 1,491 votes; and Tarmo Tamm (K), 1,721 votes.
- Compensatory mandates - Maire Aunaste (IRL), 679 votes; and Arno Sild (EKRE), 523 votes.

==== 2011 ====
Results of the 2011 parliamentary election held on 6 March 2011:

Party		Votes per county					Total Votes	%	Seats			
Party		Põlva	Valga	Võru	Expat- riates	Elec- tronic	Total Votes	%	Per.	Dis.	Com.	Tot.
Estonian Reform Party	RE	3,467	2,695	3,262	20	3,039	12,483	26.91%	0	2	1	3
Social Democratic Party	SDE	2,263	2,841	4,364	15	2,505	11,988	25.85%	0	2	0	2
Pro Patria and Res Publica Union	IRL	2,054	2,194	3,063	40	2,276	9,627	20.76%	0	2	0	2
Estonian Centre Party	K	2,896	2,581	2,264	8	826	8,575	18.49%	0	1	2	3
People's Union of Estonia	ERL	512	464	530	11	226	1,743	3.76%	0	0	0	0
Estonian Greens	EER	289	295	300	15	307	1,206	2.60%	0	0	0	0
Party of Estonian Christian Democrats	EKD	101	62	164	3	65	395	0.85%	0	0	0	0
Estonian Independence Party	EIP	68	55	78	1	46	248	0.53%	0	0	0	0
Russian Party in Estonia	VEE	17	66	18	8	8	117	0.25%	0	0	0	0
Valid votes		11,667	11,253	14,043	121	9,298	46,382	100.00%	0	7	3	10
Rejected votes		198	152	236	8	0	594	1.26%				
Total polled		11,865	11,405	14,279	129	9,298	46,976	58.83%				
Registered electors		24,919	24,716	30,093	129		79,857					

The following candidates were elected:

- District mandates - Jaak Aaviksoo (IRL), 3,484 votes; Urmas Klaas (RE), 2,990 votes; Kalvi Kõva (SDE), 2,889 votes; Heimar Lenk (K), 2,807 votes; Ivari Padar (SDE), 3,227 votes; Valdo Randpere (RE), 4,794 votes; and Priit Sibul (IRL), 2,385 votes.
- Compensatory mandates - Inara Luigas (K), 1,481 votes; Meelis Mälberg (RE), 1,013 votes; and Ester Tuiksoo (K), 971 votes.

==== 2007 ====
Results of the 2007 parliamentary election held on 4 March 2007:

Party		Votes per county					Total Votes	%	Seats			
Party		Põlva	Valga	Võru	Expat- riates	Elec- tronic	Total Votes	%	Per.	Dis.	Com.	Tot.
Estonian Reform Party	RE	4,138	2,972	3,932	10	577	11,629	24.80%	0	2	1	3
Estonian Centre Party	K	3,503	3,473	3,152	6	176	10,310	21.99%	0	2	1	3
Social Democratic Party	SDE	2,141	1,594	4,216	9	400	8,360	17.83%	1	0	0	1
Pro Patria and Res Publica Union	IRL	1,321	1,786	3,109	70	364	6,650	14.18%	0	1	0	1
People's Union of Estonia	ERL	2,156	2,442	1,772	21	132	6,523	13.91%	0	1	0	1
Estonian Greens	EER	773	618	882	7	159	2,439	5.20%	0	0	0	0
Party of Estonian Christian Democrats	EKD	162	203	299	2	17	683	1.46%	0	0	0	0
Estonian Independence Party	EIP	44	38	46	0	5	133	0.28%	0	0	0	0
Constitution Party	K	54	37	12	1	2	106	0.23%	0	0	0	0
Estonian Left Party	EVP	8	9	10	1	6	34	0.07%	0	0	0	0
Russian Party in Estonia	VEE	4	11	9	0	2	26	0.06%	0	0	0	0
Valid votes		14,304	13,183	17,439	127	1,840	46,893	100.00%	1	6	2	9
Rejected votes		188	153	190	10	0	541	1.14%				
Total polled		14,492	13,336	17,629	137	1,840	47,434	58.64%				
Registered electors		25,240	24,985	30,526	137		80,888					

The following candidates were elected:

- Personal mandates - Ivari Padar (SDE), 5,522 votes.
- District mandates - Urmas Klaas (RE), 3,258 votes; Heimar Lenk (K), 3,711 votes; Margus Lepik (RE), 2,176 votes; Inara Luigas (K), 1,910 votes; Erki Nool (IRL), 3,178 votes; and Ester Tuiksoo (ERL), 1,722 votes.
- Compensatory mandates - Ivi Eenmaa (RE), 2,150 votes; and Toivo Tootsen (K), 761 votes.

==== 2003 ====
Results of the 2003 parliamentary election held on 2 March 2003:

Party		Votes per county				Total Votes	%	Seats			
Party		Põlva	Valga	Võru	Expat- riates	Total Votes	%	Per.	Dis.	Com.	Tot.
Estonian Centre Party	K	4,079	3,506	3,876	4	11,465	24.95%	0	2	0	2
People's Union of Estonia	ERL	2,411	3,697	3,308	9	9,425	20.51%	0	2	1	3
Union for the Republic–Res Publica	ÜVE-RP	2,708	2,606	3,516	24	8,854	19.27%	0	1	1	2
Moderate People's Party	RM	2,127	1,089	3,664	13	6,893	15.00%	1	0	0	1
Estonian Reform Party	RE	1,869	1,520	1,782	8	5,179	11.27%	0	1	1	2
Pro Patria Union Party	I	509	454	1,306	49	2,318	5.05%	0	0	0	0
Jaanus Raidal (Independent)		104	450	48	1	603	1.31%	0	0	0	0
Estonian United People's Party	EÜRP	155	288	67	4	514	1.12%	0	0	0	0
Estonian Christian People's Party	EKRP	94	84	189	1	368	0.80%	0	0	0	0
Estonian Social Democratic Labour Party	ESDTP	34	43	78	0	155	0.34%	0	0	0	0
Estonian Independence Party	EIP	33	40	41	0	114	0.25%	0	0	0	0
Russian Party in Estonia	VEE	4	16	15	3	38	0.08%	0	0	0	0
Edgar-Julius Pruks (Independent)		7	1	9	0	17	0.04%	0	0	0	0
Valid votes		14,134	13,794	17,899	116	45,943	100.00%	1	6	3	10
Rejected votes		210	209	256	3	678	1.45%				
Total polled		14,344	14,003	18,155	119	46,621	57.39%				
Registered electors		25,409	24,976	30,732	119	81,236					
Turnout		56.45%	56.07%	59.08%	100.00%	57.39%					

The following candidates were elected:

- Personal mandates - Ivari Padar (RM), 5,253 votes.
- District mandates - Heimar Lenk (K), 2,487 votes; Robert Lepikson (K), 4,496 votes; Rein Randver (ERL), 2,568 votes; Janno Reiljan (ERL), 1,682 votes; Toomas Savi (RE), 1,987 votes; and Hannes Võrno (ÜVE-RP), 3,584 votes.
- Compensatory mandates - Meelis Atonen (RE), 604 votes; Margus Leivo (ERL), 792 votes; and Marko Mihkelson (ÜVE-RP), 1,313 votes.

==== 1999 ====
Results of the 1999 parliamentary election held on 7 March 1999:

Party		Votes per county				Total Votes	%	Seats			
Party		Põlva	Valga	Võru	Expat- riates	Total Votes	%	Per.	Dis.	Com.	Tot.
Estonian Centre Party	K	4,856	3,963	3,725	12	12,556	27.45%	0	2	0	2
Moderate	M	2,185	1,639	3,129	22	6,975	15.25%	0	1	1	2
Estonian Country People's Party	EME	1,902	2,213	2,777	14	6,906	15.10%	0	1	1	2
Estonian Coalition Party	KE	1,594	2,057	2,778	6	6,435	14.07%	0	1	1	2
Pro Patria Union	I	1,375	1,314	1,705	152	4,546	9.94%	0	0	0	0
Estonian Reform Party	RE	1,311	1,370	1,616	15	4,312	9.43%	0	0	1	1
Farmers' Assembly		300	401	183	1	885	1.94%	0	0	0	0
Estonian Christian People's Party	EKRP	240	154	462	3	859	1.88%	0	0	0	0
Estonian United People's Party	EÜRP	219	326	150	0	695	1.52%	0	0	0	0
Estonian Blue Party	ESE	210	205	220	3	638	1.39%	0	0	0	0
Russian Party in Estonia	VEE	188	196	134	0	518	1.13%	0	0	0	0
Vaino Rauba (Independent)		39	22	226	0	287	0.63%	0	0	0	0
Progress Party		2	69	20	0	91	0.20%	0	0	0	0
Aatso Kooskora (Independent)		16	6	9	1	32	0.07%	0	0	0	0
Valid votes		14,437	13,935	17,134	229	45,735	100.00%	0	5	4	9
Rejected votes		285	328	385	5	1,003	2.15%				
Total polled		14,722	14,263	17,519	234	46,738	55.82%				
Registered electors		25,658	25,838	31,996	234	83,726					
Turnout		57.38%	55.20%	54.75%	100.00%	55.82%					

The following candidates were elected:

- District mandates - Jaak-Hans Kuks (M), 1,569 votes; Georg Pelisaar (K), 4,459 votes; Arnold Rüütel (EME), 3,701 votes; Mart Siimann (KE), 1,874 votes; and Ülo Tootsen (K), 1,494 votes.
- Compensatory mandates - Janno Reiljan (EME), 1,234 votes; Paul-Eerik Rummo (RE), 1,235 votes; Rainis Ruusamäe (M), 613 votes; and Elmar-Johannes Truu (KE), 1,033 votes.

==== 1995 ====
Results of the 1995 parliamentary election held on 5 March 1995:

Party		Votes per county				Total Votes	%	Seats			
Party		Põlva	Valga	Võru	Expat- riates	Total Votes	%	Per.	Dis.	Com.	Tot.
Coalition Party and Rural People's Association	KMÜ	7,542	7,842	7,110	50	22,544	40.65%	1	3	0	4
The Right Wingers	P	1,654	1,441	6,618	52	9,765	17.61%	1	0	0	1
Better Estonia/Estonian Citizen	PE/EK	1,673	1,523	1,082	6	4,284	7.72%	0	0	0	0
Estonian Reform Party	RE	1,582	1,180	906	31	3,699	6.67%	0	0	1	1
Estonian Centre Party	K	1,079	1,073	1,341	7	3,500	6.31%	0	0	1	1
Pro Patria and ERSP Union	I\ERSP	768	760	1,150	236	2,914	5.25%	0	0	0	0
Estonian Farmers' Party	ETRE	517	635	1,460	15	2,627	4.74%	0	0	0	0
Estonian Future Party	TEE	571	801	341	2	1,715	3.09%	0	0	0	0
Moderate	M	391	307	479	13	1,190	2.15%	0	0	0	0
Justice	Õ	267	244	500	0	1,011	1.82%	0	0	0	0
Forest Party		253	208	264	5	730	1.32%	0	0	0	0
Our Home is Estonia	MKOE	114	277	179	1	571	1.03%	0	0	0	0
Fourth Force	NJ	133	130	78	2	343	0.62%	0	0	0	0
Estonian National Federation	ERKL	85	105	68	1	259	0.47%	0	0	0	0
Johannes Raidla (Independent)		157	20	23	1	201	0.36%	0	0	0	0
Blue Party	SE	22	46	29	0	97	0.17%	0	0	0	0
Estonian Democratic Union	EDL	2	3	8	0	13	0.02%	0	0	0	0
Valid votes		16,810	16,595	21,636	422	55,463	100.00%	2	3	2	7
Rejected votes		202	185	179	0	566	1.01%				
Total polled		17,012	16,780	21,815	422	56,029	67.87%				
Registered electors		25,326	25,206	31,596	422	82,550					
Turnout		67.17%	66.57%	69.04%	100.00%	67.87%					

The following candidates were elected:

- Personal mandates - Kaido Kama (P), 8,225 votes; and Arnold Rüütel (KMÜ), 17,189 votes.
- District mandates - Eldur Parder (KMÜ), 729 votes; Ülo Peets (KMÜ), 617 votes; and Olev Toomet (KMÜ), 1,130 votes.
- Compensatory mandates - Valve Raudnask (K), 1,457 votes; and Toomas Vilosius (RE), 1,923 votes.

==== 1992 ====
Results of the 1992 parliamentary election held on 20 September 1992:

Party		Votes per county				Total Votes	%	Seats			
Party		Põlva	Valga	Võru	Expat- riates	Total Votes	%	Per.	Dis.	Com.	Tot.
Estonian Citizen	EK	4,626	6,266	6,197	20	17,109	35.87%	1	2	0	3
Estonian National Independence Party	ERSP	2,274	3,184	3,007	321	8,786	18.42%	1	1	1	3
Pro Patria	I	1,681	1,130	2,759	230	5,800	12.16%	0	1	0	1
Vello-Taivo Denks (Independent)		431	355	2,186	2	2,974	6.23%	0	0	0	0
Popular Front of Estonia	R	1,331	542	692	21	2,586	5.42%	0	0	1	1
Moderate	M	816	684	807	24	2,331	4.89%	0	0	1	1
Safe Home	KK	553	910	685	16	2,164	4.54%	0	0	0	0
Farmers' Assembly		440	913	339	12	1,704	3.57%	0	0	0	0
Independent Kings	SK	538	463	661	5	1,667	3.49%	0	0	1	1
Estonian Union of Pensioners	EPL	490	583	472	4	1,549	3.25%	0	0	0	0
National Party of the Illegally Repressed	ÕRRE	79	257	249	8	593	1.24%	0	0	0	0
Greens	R	123	74	95	1	293	0.61%	0	0	0	0
Estonian Entrepreneurs' Party	EEE	26	34	61	3	124	0.26%	0	0	0	0
The Democrats		6	10	7	0	23	0.05%	0	0	0	0
Valid votes		13,414	15,405	18,217	667	47,703	100.00%	2	4	4	10
Rejected votes		346	336	315	0	997	2.05%				
Total polled		13,760	15,741	18,532	667	48,700	66.76%				
Registered electors		21,991	22,949	27,328	678	72,946					
Turnout		62.57%	68.59%	67.81%	98.38%	66.76%					

The following candidates were elected:

- Personal mandates - Jaanus Raidal (ERSP), 5,341 votes; and Jüri Toomepuu (EK), 16,904 votes.
- District mandates - Epp Haabsaar (ERSP), 1,271 votes; Kaido Kama (I), 3,139 votes; Paul-Olev Mõtsküla (EK), 154 votes; and Toivo Uustalo (EK), 51 votes.
- Compensatory mandates - Jüri Adams (ERSP), 833 votes; Ignar Fjuk (R), 732 votes; Tõnu Kõrda (SK), 1,179 votes; and Marju Lauristin (M), 1,780 votes.
