= Ester Karuse =

Estonian politician (born 1992)

Member of the Riigikogu
- Incumbent
- Assumed office 10 April 2023

Personal details
- Born: 19 November 1992 (age 33) Valga, Estonia
- Party: Estonian Social Democratic Party (2024–present)
- Other political affiliations: Centre Party (2011–2024)
- Education: Estonian Entrepreneurship University of Applied Sciences
- Occupation: Politician

Ester Karuse (born 19 November 1992) is an Estonian politician representing the Estonian Centre Party (Estonian: Eesti Keskerakond, EK). From 13 March 2020 until 26 April 2021, she was the mayor of Valga Parish. Following the 2023 Estonian parliamentary election, she was elected to the Riigikogu.

Ester Karuse was born and raised in Valga, where she attended primary and secondary schools. She is a graduate of the Estonian Entrepreneurship University of Applied Sciences with a degree in business management. Afterward, she worked as a logistician and transport coordinator for her father Allain Karuse's transport business A-Karuse AS. Since 2016, she has been an auxiliary police officer.

Karuse has been a member of the Centre Party since 30 January 2011. In the 2017 local government council election in Valga Parish, she ran on the list of the Centre Party and achieved the 4th best result in the district with 196 votes and was elected as a member of the Valga municipal council with a list mandate. Valid votes were cast by 7,024 persons, and the simple quota or personal mandate was 260 votes. Allain Karuse, Karuse's father, received the best result in the region with 1,089 votes.

In the 2019 Estonian parliamentary election, Karuse campaigned in electoral district no. 11 (Võru, Valga and Põlva counties) and achieved the 5th best result in the district with 1,665 votes, but was not elected. Only Tarmo Tamm (2,824 votes) from the Centre Party received more votes in this district. Valid votes were cast by 43,090 persons, and the simple quota, or individual mandate, was 5,386 votes. Uno Kaskpeit, representing the Conservative People's Party of Estonia (EKRE) received the best result in the district with 3,802 votes.

From September 2019 to 13 March 2020, she was an adviser to the Riigikogu Centre Party faction. On 13 March 2020, she retired the position as the Valga Parish council elected her as Valga Parish mayor.

She campaigned for election in Riigikogu electoral district no. 11 (Võru, Valga and Põlva counties) in the 2023 Estonian parliamentary election and was elected to the XV Riigikogu with 1,677 votes.

On 23 March 2023, Karuse's father, Allain Karuse, was convicted in Tartu County Court of offenses against freedom of election during the 2021 Estonian municipal elections and the illegal handling of liquid fuels for which an aggregate punishment of €12,450 was ordered by the court. Karuse was found guilty of swaying ten persons to vote for either himself or Ester Karuse at the 2021 local government council elections in Valga. In exchange, he promised two persons small amounts of free diesel fuel. One person was offered at least €20 in cash for voting for himself or Ester Karuse. Ester Karuse was not implicated in any wrongdoing.

On 5 January 2024, Karuse and three other members (Tanel Kiik, Jaak Aab and Andre Hanimägi) of the 15th Riigikogu announced their departure from the Centre Party and joined the Estonian Social Democratic Party.
