= Electronic voting in Estonia =

System of voting in government elections via the Internet in Estonia

Electronic voting in Estonia gained popularity in 2001 with the "e-minded" coalition government. In 2005, it became the first nation to hold legally binding general elections over the Internet with their pilot project for municipal elections. Estonian election officials declared the electronic voting system a success and found that it withstood the test of real-world use.

Internet voting was also used in the 2007 Estonian parliamentary election, another world first. In 2023 parliamentary elections for the first time more than half of the total votes were cast over the internet.

== Internet voting ==
The term Power voting (or e-voting) can refer to both fixed voting locations (as in voting booths) and remote (as in over the Internet) electronic voting. To reduce confusion between the two, electronic voting is known as i-Voting in Estonia. The security model is modeled after the way in which advance voting and postal voting is handled.

== Overview of Estonian internet voting ==
The Estonian internet voting system builds on the Estonian ID card. The card is a regular and mandatory national identity document as well as a smart card, allowing for both secure remote authentication and legally binding digital signatures using the Estonian state supported public key infrastructure. As of March 2007, over 1.08 million cards have been issued (out of the Estonian population of 1.32 million).

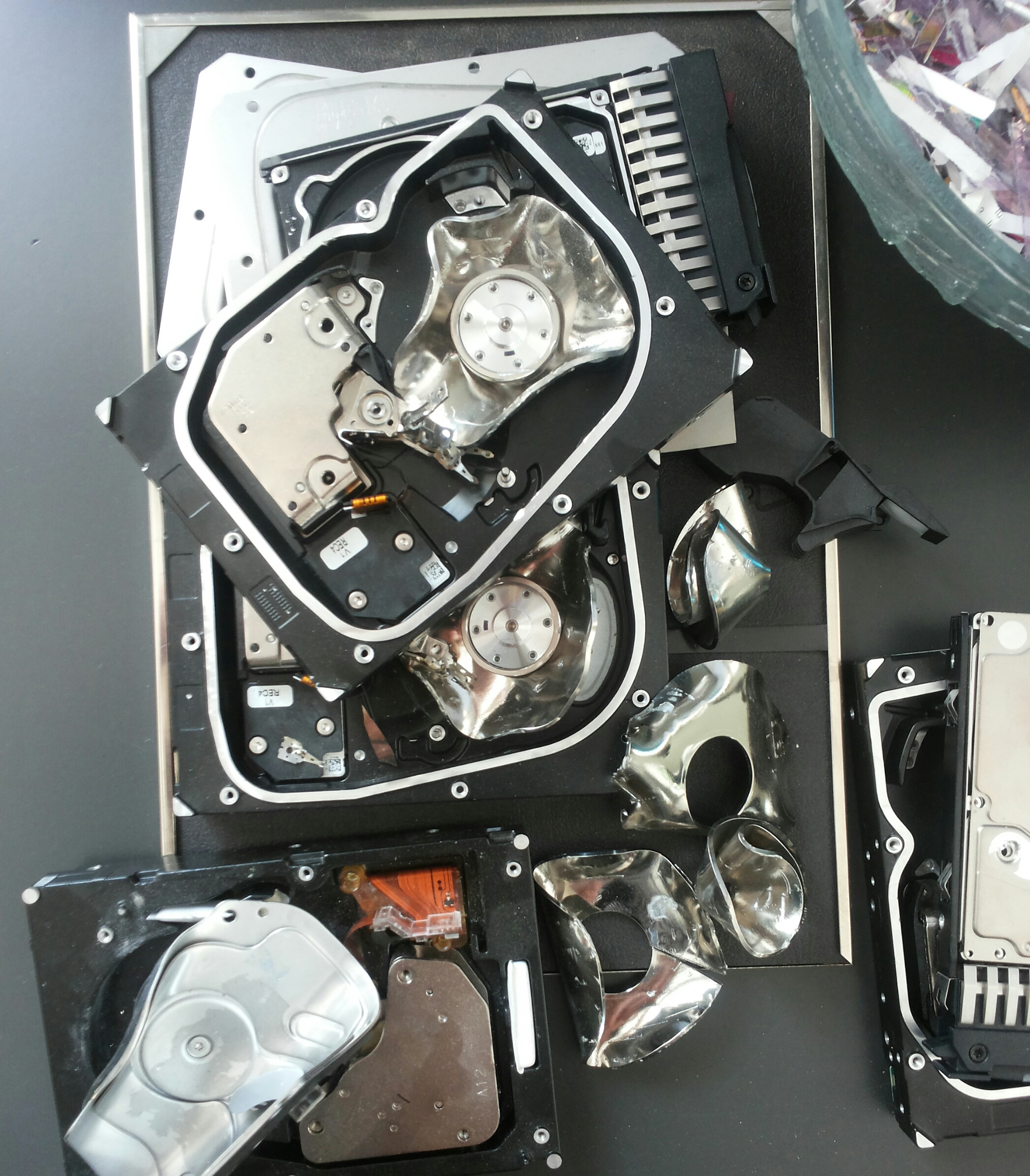
Remains of disks destroyed by Electoral Committee in 2013

Internet voting is available during an early voting period (four to six days prior to Election Day). Voters can change their electronic votes an unlimited number of times, with the final vote being tabulated. Anyone who votes using the Internet can vote at a polling station during the early voting period, invalidating their Internet vote. It is possible to change the electronic vote on Election Day since 2021. Votes are counted on Election Day after polling stations are closed and storage media containing the votes are physically destroyed after all election complaints are resolved at least one month after elections.

A cost-efficiency comparison of the different voting channels offered in the Estonian Municipal Elections (2017) concluded that Internet voting is the most cost-efficient voting channel offered by the Estonian electoral system.

The principle of "one person, one vote" is maintained, as the voter is able to cast more than one ballot, but only one vote is ultimately recorded. This assertion was challenged in August 2005 by Arnold Rüütel, then President of Estonia, who saw the new e-voting provisions in the Local Government Council Election Act as a breach of the principle of equality of voting. The President petitioned against the e-voting provisions to the Supreme Court of Estonia but lost.

=== Transparency and verifiability ===
According to the recommendations of OSCE/ODIHR election observers, and because of a voting client hacking case brought to the Supreme Court in 2011, Estonia implemented vote verification for individual voters in 2013. Voters verify their ballots by using a smartphone application which uses a QR code displayed by the desktop voting client to display the candidate for whom the vote was cast. Individual verification verifies that the vote cast was stored on the vote collection server for not more than either 30 or 60 minutes, depending on the election. The voter cannot directly verify that the vote was also tallied as cast.

The voting system's serverside source code was published in June 2013 because of social pressure initiated by Tanel Tammet, a computer scientist who coauthored research papers from 2001 on electronic voting requirements. The source code was published on GitHub and has been available for all subsequent elections. Neither the voting client's source code nor the reference code have been published, as election officials have determined that this would allow malicious actors to build fake voting clients. Because the voting protocol is public, anyone can build a voting client.

In 2015, extensive reports from OSCE/ODIHR election observers and an independent observing team led by J. Alex Halderman in 2015, as well as public pressure from local activists, motivated the implementation of universal vote tally verifiability in 2017. Tally verification is done by mixnet, making use of homomorphic properties and ElGamal encryption provided by Douglas Wikström. Universal tally verification is not a mandatory part of the process, and is conducted by a dedicated data auditor. Tallying the votes with mixnet is done in parallel with plain text extraction of the votes from encrypted envelopes, which are decrypted using the voting commission's secret key and from which the digital signatures of voters are removed.

Although a white paper on Estonia's 2017-2019 implementation of its electronic voting system claims that the system permits end-to-end verifiability, this has been denied by independent researchers. A working group was formed by Minister of Foreign Trade and Information Technology Kert Kingo in order to assess the "verifiability, security and transparency" of electronic voting. The group produced a report consisting of 25 improvement proposals, of which proposals 11, 13 and 25 pertain to the system's problems with verifiability. The government coalition agreement also asserts the need for independent international auditing of the system.

After 2023 parliamentary elections OSCE/ODIHR observers as well as local observers still claim that neither individual nor universal verifiability is consistently provided Estonian e-voting, which makes the system not end-to-end verifiable, despite the claims of the authorities. The same assessment has been echoed in reports commissioned by government institutions of Norway and Ukraine.

== Criticism ==
Despite praise from Estonian election officials, computer security experts from outside the country who have reviewed the system have criticized it, warning that any voting system that transmits ballots electronically cannot be secure. This criticism was underscored in May 2014, when a team of international computer security experts released their examination of the system, claiming they could breach the system, change votes and vote totals, and erase all evidence of their actions if they were to install malware on Estonian election servers. The team advised the Estonian government to halt all online voting because of the potential threats that it posed to their government.

The Estonian National Electoral Committee reviewed the concerns and published a response, saying that the claims "give us no reason to suspend online balloting". The purported vulnerabilities were said to be either infeasible in reality or already accounted for in the design of the e-voting system. The Estonian Information System Authority also responded to the claims, describing them as a political, rather than technical, attack on the e-voting system, and criticizing the method of disclosure. The researchers' connection to the Estonian Centre Party, which has long been critical of e-voting, has also been a common speculation among Estonian state officials and has been even suggested by a prime minister.

The main author of a white paper on Estonian electronic voting from 2001, Helger Lipmaa, criticized the system, and wrote in a 2011 blog post that he used paper ballot on that year's election. The main author of the second white paper on Estonian electronic voting from 2001, Tanel Tammet, has been campaigning for the opening of the system's source code and for the implementation of independent parallel systems to guarantee trust in the e-voting system. The serverside code was published under the Creative Commons BY-NC-ND license on GitHub as a result of those efforts in July 2013.

The OSCE/ODIHR election observation mission has voiced concerns about Estonian e-voting during every parliament election, initially proposing in 2007 that e-voting be suspended if its problems remain unaddressed, then suggesting in 2011 that the election commission should create an inclusive working group for improving e-voting and that cryptographic measures should be implemented to ensure that voting is observable and noting that the verification features implemented for the 2015 elections only partially address their previous recommendations.

In a 2012 overview of international e-voting implementations, IFES independent researchers found that, although insofar successful, in situation of "emerging international electoral standards with respect to Internet voting" Estonian voting system faces necessary improvements for "better legislation, a transparent policy and formalized procedures" as well as "broader democratic goals, such as enhancing civic e-participation" need to be considered.

In 2013 Free Software Foundation Europe criticized partial publishing of the source code of e-voting system and for using non-software licenses for publication. FSFE also suggests researching into solutions that lessen reliance on system administrators and instead build the system on cryptographic models of trust. Since the weakest part of voting infrastructure is voter's computer, FSFE suggests Estonia should mitigate the risks of unnoticed subversion of votes in compromised client machines and "publicise the dangers as widely as possible, along with instructions to minimise the risk and rectify the situation should a risk realise".

There have been also attempts to expose problems of voting system by proofs of concept. In 2011 Paavo Pihelgas created a trojan that was theoretically able to change voter's choice without user noticing. He used this as basis for filing an election complaint and demanded that Supreme Court invalidates election results. The court dismissed the case because Pihelgas's "voter's rights had not been infringed as long as he had knowingly put himself into the situation".

In 2015, an activist from the Estonian Pirate Party, Märt Põder, took credit for casting an invalid ballot "using a GNU debugger to locate the breakpoint in Linux IVCA where the candidate number is stored and replace it with an invalid candidate number". Being only one among 176,491 e-voters to do it, the activist explained to the media that client application source code should be opened up and taught as part of general education in public schools to make people trust e-voting. Later negotiating with electoral commission, an activist went on to stress that end-to-end verifiability is a prerequisite for reliable e-voting, and that the whole process of planning, procuring and implementing e-voting should be conducted in English as well, which opens up to the international community for proper scrutiny.

In 2016, computer scientists at the University of Oxford, while acknowledging relative success of conducting e-voting, they claimed that e-voting system officials "have relied since the system's inception on building trust through interpersonal relations," and that "may work well for a close-knit society such as that of Estonia". However, "informal processes (including lessons learned) should be further clarified and formally documented".

In beginning of June 2019, Kert Kingo, Minister of Foreign Trade and Information Technology of the newly elected government created an inclusive working group to assess the "verifiability, security and transparency" of the Estonian electronic voting system. The working group consisted of state officials, representatives from universities and research institutes, critics, and creators of the system. In December 2019 they presented results of the six-month investigation, with 25 proposals for improving the core infrastructure of the Estonian e-voting system.

After contested 2023 parliamentary elections the distrust in e-voting reached 40% of the population and parliamentary filibuster that lasted until 2024. After series election complaints the Supreme Court repeated their 2019 prescription to stipulate important parts of e-voting in law. Estonian election observers demanded rendering e-voting observable, but although the parliament passed changes to electoral law just before 2024 European Parliament elections, the proposals of election observers were dismissed. Anti-Corruption Select Committee of the parliament discussed e-voting two times, which lead to plenary discussion of online elections as a matter of significant national importance. In the discussion under the title "Online elections – a threat to democracy" attorney-at-law Paul Keres proposed election complaints in defense of public interest should be introduced and election observer Märt Põder presented his findings, first published at Chaos Communication Congress in 2023.

The discussions lead to public demand to find solutions for the problems with e-voting and in 2024, after OSCE/ODIHR had been visiting in Estonia to present their findings. In Autumn Conservative People's Party initiated an address to Venice Commission to assess Estonian e-voting, which although initially blocked at the parliament committee, was instead on behalf of vice president of the parliament Arvo Aller submitted to OSCE/ODIHR based on their request. In his 2024 thesis Kristjan Düüna, the student at TalTech on the basis of OSCE/ODIHR report experimentally showed how in 2023 elections Electoral Committee could have manipulated the results without detection. After the findings were presented in Estonian media in early 2025, the supervisor of the student with the authorities engaged in media campaign to claim that manipulation was outruled by manual checks.

In October 2024 the Standing Committee on Cybersecurity of the Academy of Sciences introduced its risk analysis for Estonian voting technologies, where they presented six risk scenarios, two of which reiterated the lack of auditability of electronic voting as brought up by election observers in 2023, two risks were related to misinformation campaigns and criticism of e-voting, one underlined the problems of auditability in case of mobile devices and one risk was related to connectivity to Internet. Neutrality of the findings was contested in media, because of the conflicts of interests as the committee was led by Dan Bogdanov, CSO of vendor of Estonian e-voting system Cybernetica with participation of their current and previous partners as well as specialists from Electoral Committee and governmental institutions.

== History ==
2019 election, Most voted-for party by counties and city districts, excluding electronic voting (43.8% of all votes): Reform Centre Conservative People's

2019 election, Most-voted for party (electronic voting) by electoral district: Reform Centre

=== 2025 elections ===
In the 2025 local municipal elections, 270,818 people voted over the Internet. This means that roughly 45.8% of participating voters gave their vote over the Internet.

=== 2023 elections ===
With 312,181 electronic votes, these were the first elections in history where more than half of the votes (51.1%) were cast online.

After the publication of the e-vote results, Martin Helme, the leader of EKRE, stated that "he does not trust the e-vote results" and demanded a recount.

=== 2019 elections ===
In the 2019 parliamentary elections, 247,232 people, or 43.8% of all participants, voted over the Internet.

In the European Parliament elections, 155,521 people voted over the Internet. This means that roughly 46.7% of participating voters gave their vote over the Internet.

=== 2017 elections ===
In the 2017 local municipal elections, 186,034 people voted over the Internet. This means that roughly 31.7% of participating voters gave their vote over the Internet.

=== 2015 elections ===
In the 2015 parliamentary elections, 176,491 people, 30.5% of all participants, voted over the Internet.

=== 2014 elections ===
In the European Parliament elections, 103,151 people voted over the Internet. This means that roughly 31.3% of participating voters gave their vote over the Internet.

=== 2013 elections ===
In the 2013 local municipal elections, 133,808 people voted over the Internet. This means that roughly 21.2% of participating voters gave their vote over the Internet. It was also the first election where vote verification with mobile device was implemented.

=== 2011 elections ===
In the 2011 parliamentary elections, 140,846 people voted over the Internet. This means that roughly 15.4% of the persons with the right to vote and 24.3% of participating voters gave their vote over the Internet. It was also the first election to allow for voting through chip-secure mobile phones, following a law approved by Parliament in 2008.

=== 2009 elections ===
In the 2009 local municipal elections, 104,415 people voted over the Internet. This means that roughly 9.5% of the persons with the right to vote gave their vote over the Internet.

In the European Parliament elections, 58,669 people voted over the Internet. This means that roughly 14.7% of participating voters gave their vote over the Internet.

=== 2007 elections ===
In 2007 Estonia held its and the world's first general elections with Internet voting available from February 26 to 28. A total of 30,275 citizens used Internet voting (3.4%), which means for every 30 eligible voters one of them voted through the Internet.

=== 2005 elections ===
In 2005 Estonia became the first country to offer Internet voting nationally in local elections. 9,317 people voted online (1.9%).
