= Tarmo (given name) =

Estonian and Finnish male given name

- Gender: Male

Origin
- Region of origin: Estonia, Finland

Tarmo is an Estonian and Finnish male given name.

People named Tarmo include:

- Tarmo Jallai (born 1979), Estonian track and field athlete and Olympic competitor
- Tarmo Kikerpill (born 1977), Estonian professional basketball player
- Tarmo Kink (born 1985), Estonian professional footballer
- Tarmo Koivisto (born 1948), Finnish comics artist and writer, cartoonist, and graphic artist
- Tarmo Koivuranta (born 1980), Finnish footballer
- Tarmo Kõuts (born 1953), Estonian politician and former commander-in-chief of the Estonian Defence Forces
- Tarmo Kruusimäe (born 1967), Estonian politician and musician
- Tarmo Laht (born 1960), Estonian architect
- Tarmo Leinatamm (1957–2014), Estonian conductor and politician
- Tarmo Linnumäe (born 1971), Estonian footballer
- Tarmo Loodus (born 1958), Estonian educator and politician
- Tarmo Mänd (born 1950), Estonian politician
- Tarmo Manni (1921–1999), Finnish actor
- Tarmo Mitt (born 1977), Estonian professional strongman
- Tarmo Neemelo (born 1982), Estonian footballer
- Tarmo Oja (born 1934), Estonian-Swedish astronomer
- Tarmo Pihlap (1952–1999), Estonian singer and guitarist
- Tarmo Reunanen (born 1998), Finnish ice hockey player
- Tarmo Rüütli (born 1954), Estonian football midfielder and coach
- Tarmo Saks (born 1975), Estonian football forward from Estonia
- Tarmo Soomere (born 1957), Estonian marine scientist and mathematician
- Tarmo Tamm (born 1953), Estonian politician
- Tarmo Tamm (born 1966), Estonian entrepreneur and politician
- Tarmo Teder (born 1958), Estonian writer, poet and critic
- Tarmo Timm (born 1936), Estonian zoologist
- Tarmo Uusivirta (1957–1999), Finnish boxer
- Tarmo Uustalu (born 1969), Estonian computer scientist.
- Tarmo Virkus (born 1971), Estonian rower
