= Tarmo =

Tarmo may refer to:

- Tarmo (given name), Estonian and Finnish masculine given name
- Tarmo, Estonian and Finnish family name
  - Ruut Tarmo (1896–1967), Estonian stage and film actor, and stage director
- Tarmo (1907 icebreaker), a Finnish steam-powered icebreaker
- Tarmo (1963 icebreaker), a diesel-electric icebreaker built in 1963 and sold to Estonia in 1993, see List of icebreakers
- Finnish motor torpedo boat Tarmo, a Finnish Taisto-class motor torpedo boat sunk on 21 June 1944
- Hämeenlinnan Tarmo, a Finnish sports club
