= Andre Hanimägi =

Estonian politician (born 1989)

Member of the Riigikogu
- Incumbent
- Assumed office 10 April 2023

Personal details
- Born: June 6, 1989 (age 37) Valga, then part of Estonian SSR, Soviet Union
- Party: Estonian Social Democratic Party (2024–present)
- Other political affiliations: Centre Party (2016–2024)
- Education: University of Tartu; Tallinn University
- Occupation: Politician

Andre Hanimägi (born 6 June 1989) is an Estonian politician representing the Estonian Centre Party (Estonian: Eesti Keskerakond, EK). Following the 2023 Estonian parliamentary election, he was elected to the Riigikogu.

== Biography ==
Andre Hanimägi was born in Valga, where attended primary and secondary schools. He is a 2008 graduate of Valga Gymnasium. In 2008, he enrolled in the Faculty of Social Sciences at the University of Tartu, graduating in 2011 with a Bachelor's degree in journalism and communication. He received his Master's degree in organizational communication and public relations from Tallinn University. In 2009, and again from 2011 to 2012, he was a reporter for the local Valgamaalane newspaper.

In 2010, Hanimägi worked as public relations specialist for the Valga city government. From 2012 to 2016, he was a public relations advisor for the Pirita District Government. From 2016 until 2019, he was an advisor to the Centre Party Riigikogu faction and head of public relations for the Centre Party's non-profit association. From 2019 until 2021, he was the district elder of Haabersti District Government. In 2021, he became the secretary-general of the Centre Party.

He campaigned for election in electoral district no. 1 (Haabersti, Põhja-Tallinn and Kristiine) in the 2023 Estonian parliamentary election of the Riigikogu and collected 466 votes and was elected to XV Riigikogu.

On 5 January 2024, Hanimägi and three other members (Ester Karuse, Jaak Aab and Tanel Kiik) of the 15th Riigikogu announced their departure from the Centre Party and joined the Estonian Social Democratic Party.
