= Kristo Enn Vaga =

Estonian racing cyclist and politician (born 1997)

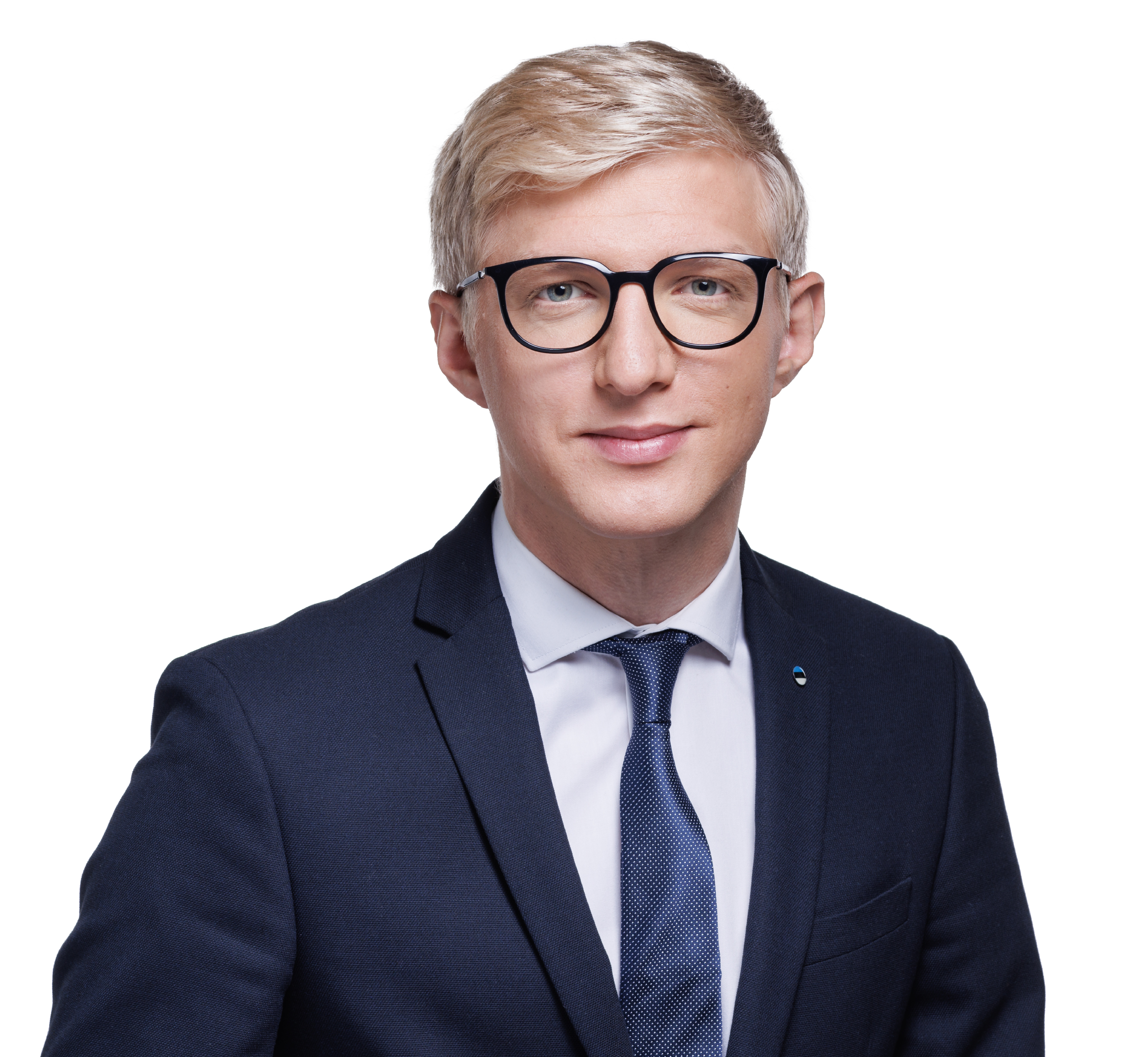
- Vaga in 2023

Member of the Riigikogu
- Incumbent
- Assumed office 10 April 2023

Personal details
- Born: 4 January 1997 (age 29) Tallinn, Estonia
- Party: Estonian Reform Party
- Children: 1
- Occupation: Politician, racing cyclist

Kristo Enn Vaga (born 4 January 1997) is an Estonian racing cyclist and politician representing the Estonian Reform Party (Estonian: Eesti Reformierakond). Following the 2023 Estonian parliamentary election, he was elected to the Riigikogu.

== Early life ==
Kristo Enn Vaga was born and raised in Tallinn.

== Cycling career ==
In 2014, he became the Estonian junior champion in road bicycle racing and competed with the Estonia national team U23. In 2015, he took second place in the Estonian Junior Road Championship and ninth place in the European Junior Road Championship and was the Estonian team pursuit champion (with Siim Kiskonen, Tair Stalberg, and Kirill Tarassov), and Estonian team sprint champion (with Kirill Tarassov and Oliver Keller). In France, he finished sixth on the Mont Faron stage of the Tour de la Région Sud PACA Juniors.

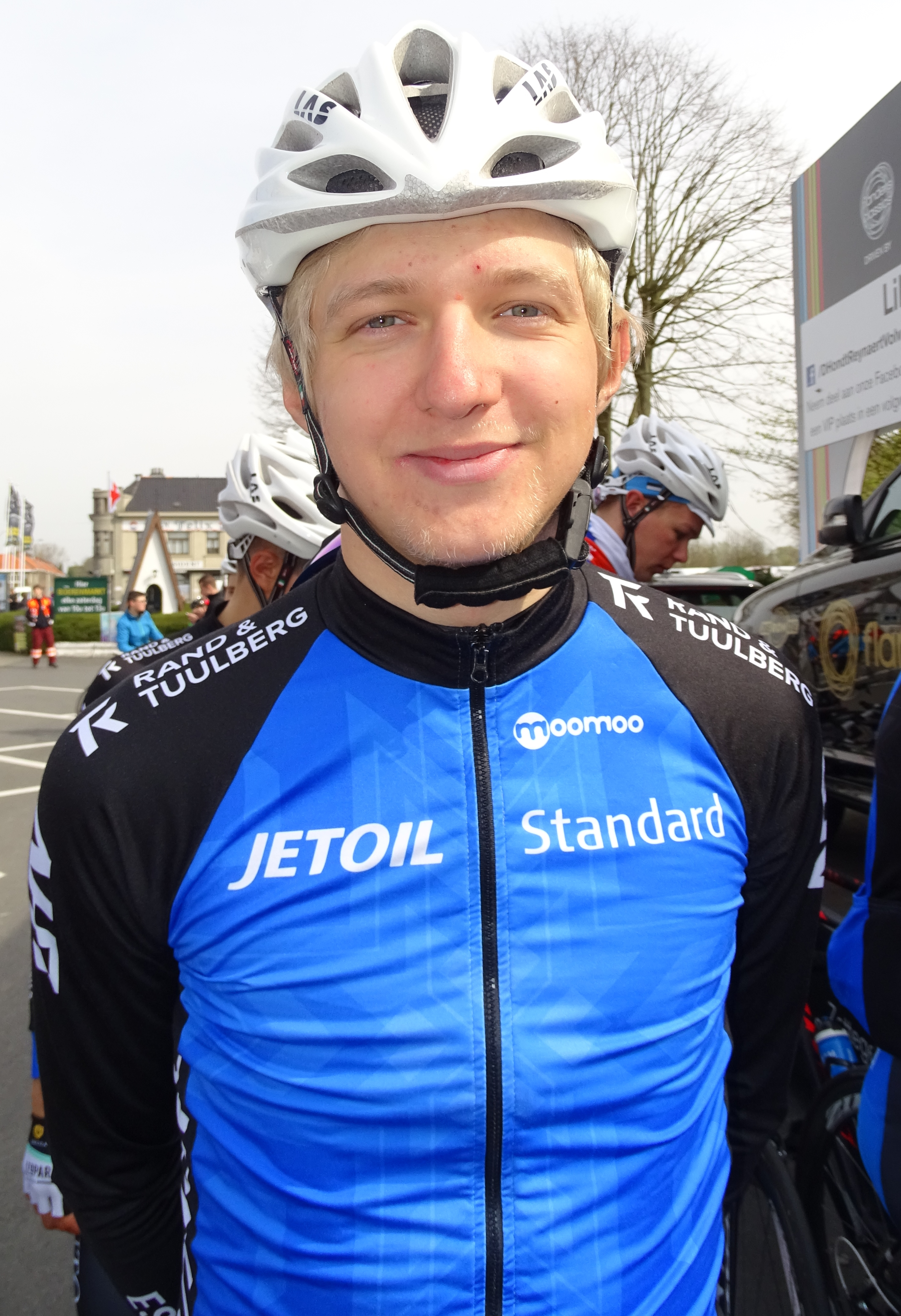
Vaga during the 2016 Tour of Flanders

For the 2016 season, he signed a contract with the French club Charvieu-Chavagneux Isère Cyclisme, competing in the national division. With it, he achieved several honors, taking fifth in the Nocturne de Montrevel-en-Bresse, seventh place in the Tour de Côte-d'Or, and eighth in the Critérium de Briennon. In his home country, he took seventh place among the elite at the Estonian Championship. He was then recruited by UC Monaco in 2017.

== Political career ==
In 2017, Vaga became a member of the Estonian Reform Party. Soon afterward, he moved to the party's youth council and in 2017 became its general secretary. In 2020, he was elected as the chairman of Estonian Reform Party Youth. He was also the chairman of the Kristiine district assembly, worked as an advisor to Minister of Defence Kalle Laanet from 2018 until 2019, advisor to Siim Kallas from 2019 until 2021, and was the campaign manager of the Reform Party for the 2023 Riigikogu elections.

He campaigned for the Riigikoku in the 2023 elections, collecting 592 votes in Riigikogu electoral district no. 1 (Haabersti, Põhja-Tallinn and Kristiine) and was elected with a compensation mandate to the XV Riigikogu.

As of 2023, Vaga attends Tallinn University.

== Personal life ==
On 20 July 2023, he married Stinne Loo. The couple have a daughter.
