= Mart Järvik =

Estonian politician (born 1956)

Minister of Rural Affairs
- In office 29 April 2019 – 25 November 2019
- Prime Minister: Jüri Ratas
- Preceded by: Tarmo Tamm
- Succeeded by: Arvo Aller

Personal details
- Born: 21 February 1956 (age 70)
- Party: Conservative People's Party of Estonia
- Education: University of Tartu

Mart Järvik (born 21 February 1956) is an Estonian politician. He served as Ministry of Rural Affairs in the second cabinet of Prime Minister Jüri Ratas from 29 April 2019 to 25 November 2019. Arvo Aller was appointed as his successor. He is affiliated with the Conservative People's Party of Estonia (EKRE).

Political offices
Preceded by Tarmo Tamm	Minister of Rural Affairs; 2019–2019	Succeeded by Arvo Aller
