= Villu Reiljan =

Estonian politician (born 1953)

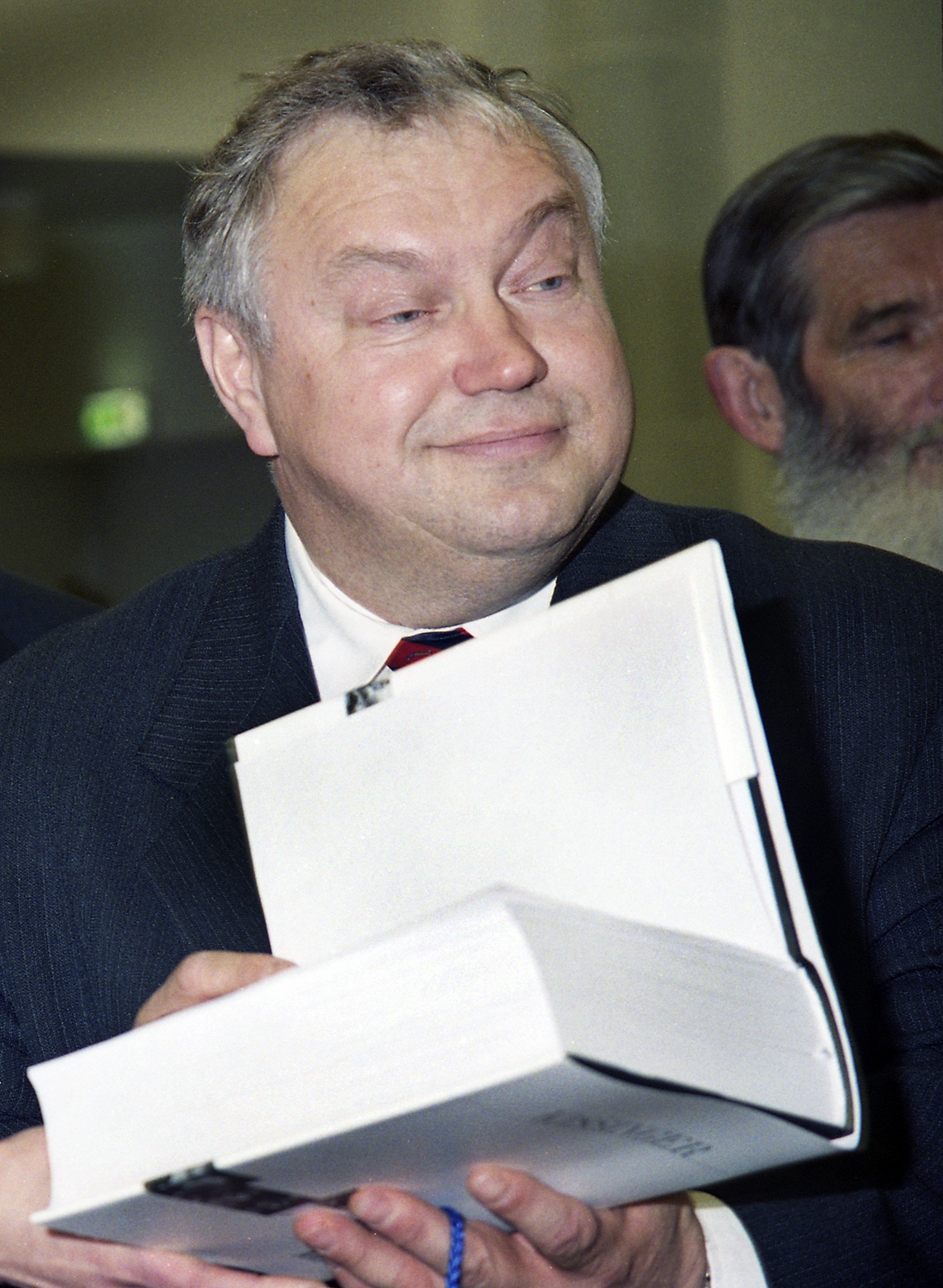
Villu Reiljan

Villu Reiljan (born 23 May 1953 in Võru) is a former Estonian politician. He has been member of VIII, IX and X Riigikogu. From 1995 to 1999 and from 2003 to 2006, he was the Minister of Environment.

In 1975 he graduated from Estonian Agricultural Academy in forest management.

He was a member of the People's Union of Estonia. His older brother was an economist and politician, Janno Reiljan.
