= Igor Taro =

Estonian politician and journalist (born 1981)

- Taro in 2026

Minister of the Interior
- Incumbent
- Assumed office 25 March 2025
- Prime Minister: Kristen Michal
- Preceded by: Hanno Pevkur (acting)

Member of the XV Riigikogu
- Incumbent
- Assumed office 2023

Personal details
- Born: 1 August 1981 (age 45) Võru, then part of Estonian SSR, Soviet Union
- Occupation: Politician, journalist

Igor Taro (1 August 1981) is an Estonian journalist and politician, who is the current Minister of the Interior. He previously served as a member of the XV Riigikogu.

== Biography ==
Taro was born in Võru. In 1999, he graduated from Võru Kreutzwald Gymnasium. He completed his studies in journalism at Moscow State University.

Throughout his career as a journalist, Igor Taro has worked as a Moscow correspondent for Õhtuleht, an editor for foreign news at the newspaper Postimees, and an editor at the newspaper Setomaa.

Starting from 2010, he worked as the Võru and Põlvamaa correspondent for Estonian Public Broadcasting (Eesti Rahvusringhääling). In January 2015, he left his job at Estonian Public Broadcasting and ran for the Riigikogu on the IRL (now Isamaa) party's list. He ran in electoral district number 11, which covers Võru, Valga, and Põlva counties, and received 1,202 votes but was not elected.

From 2015, he worked as the tourism coordinator at Võrumaa Development Agency and as the marketing and communications manager at AS Värska Sanatorium.

From 1 July 2016 to 25 October 2017, he was the County Governor of Põlva. In October 2017, he was elected as a member of the Põlva municipal council. Following the discontinuation of county governments, he resigned from the position of governor.

In the 2023 Riigikogu elections, Igor Taro ran as a candidate for Estonia 200.
