= Heimar Lenk =

Estonian journalist and politician

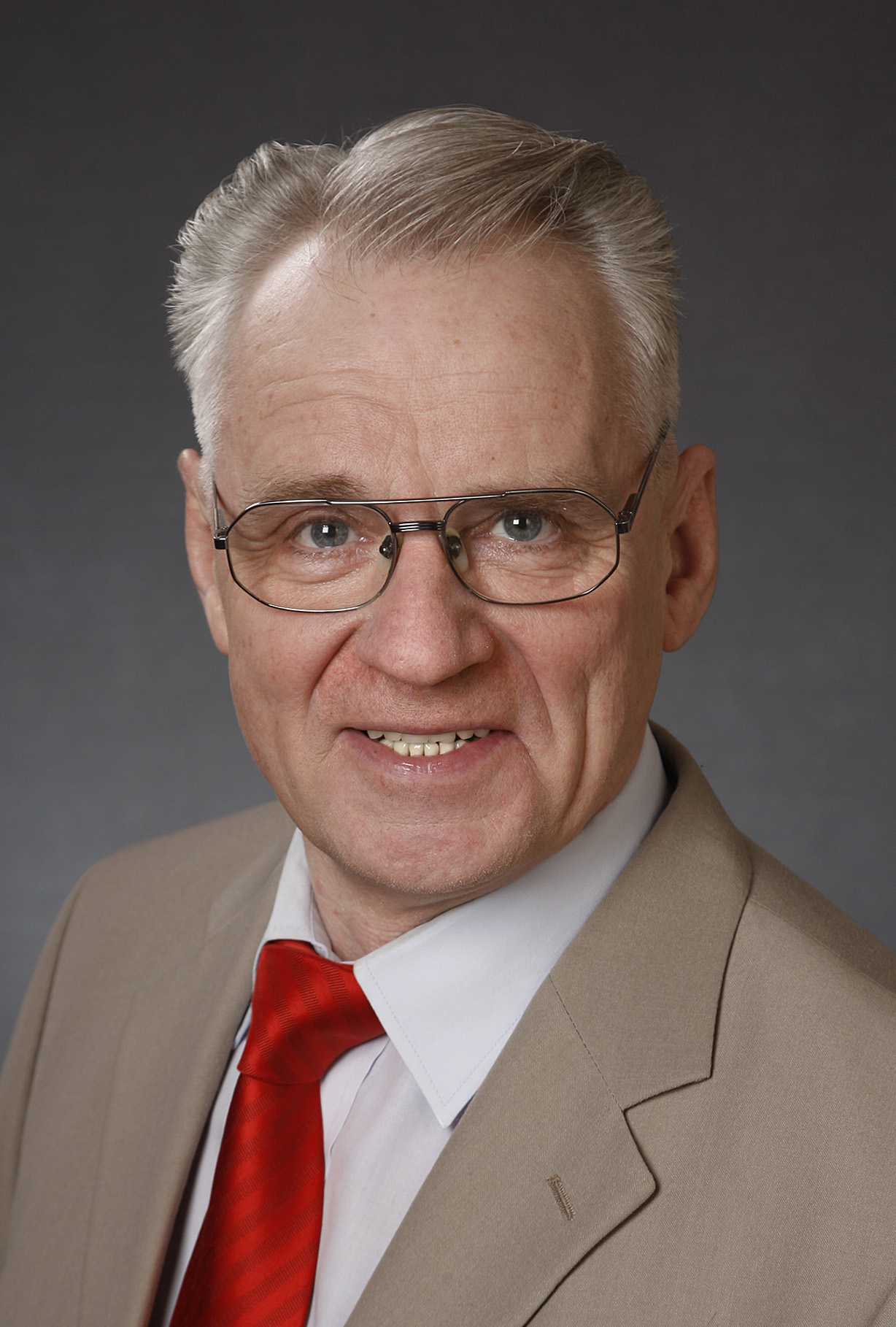
Heimar Lenk in 2011

Heimar Lenk (born 17 September 1946 in Tallinn) is an Estonian journalist and politician. He has supported the Estonian Centre Party since 1994.

== Biography ==
Lenk studied at Tallinn Polytechnic Institute as well as at Moscow State University. He then went on to work for Estonian newspapers such as Säde, Õhtuleht, Rahva Hääl, and Noorte Hääl.

In 1974 he worked in Estonian Radio and Estonian Television, and he also covered Russian radio and television stories for the Estonian audience. He also made reports from Estonia for the Soviet national television. In 1999 he was the voice of the Driving Centre Party newspaper Kesknädal, becoming editor-in-chief.

From 2002 to 2005, he was a member of the Tallinn City Council.

Lenk was nominated for the 2011 parliamentary elections.

== Personal life ==
Heimar has a sister named Marika Tuus, also a politician.
