= Tõnis Mölder =

Estonian politician (born 1989)

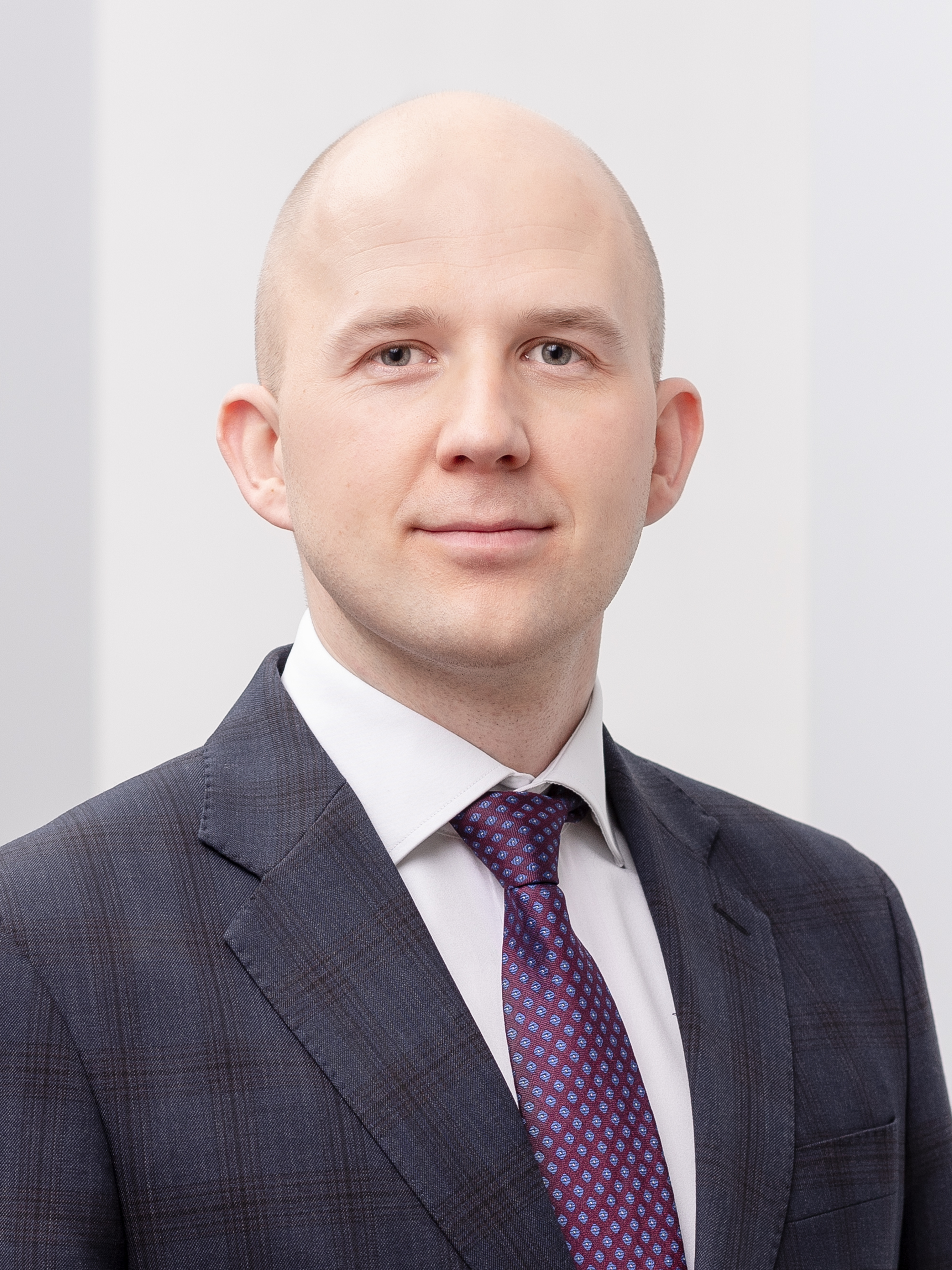

Minister of the Environment
- In office 26 January 2021 – 18 November 2021
- Prime Minister: Kaja Kallas
- Preceded by: Rain Epler
- Succeeded by: Erki Savisaar

Member of the 14th Riigikogu
- In office 30 March 2019 – 26 January 2021
- President: Kersti Kaljulaid
- Prime Minister: Jüri Ratas

Personal details
- Born: October 9, 1989 (age 36) Lihula, then part of Estonian SSR, Soviet Union
- Party: Independent (2024–present)
- Other political affiliations: Isamaa (2023–2024); Centre Party (2008-2023)
- Education: Tallinn University
- Occupation: Politician

Tõnis Mölder (born 9 October 1989) is an Estonian independent politician and member of the Riigikogu. Mölder was a member of Estonian Centre Party from 2008 to 2023, before joining conservative Isamaa in 2023, which he left in 2024, after he was declared a suspect in a bribery case.

He was the Estonian Minister for the Environment from January 2021 until November of the same year when he resigned for personal reasons. Previous to this, he had been a member of the Riigikogu, the Estonian parliament, the Deputy Mayor of Tallinn, and the Elder of Pirita.

Political offices
Preceded by Rain Epler	Minister of the Environment; 2021–present	Incumbent
