= Janno Reiljan =

Estonian politician and economist (1951–2018)

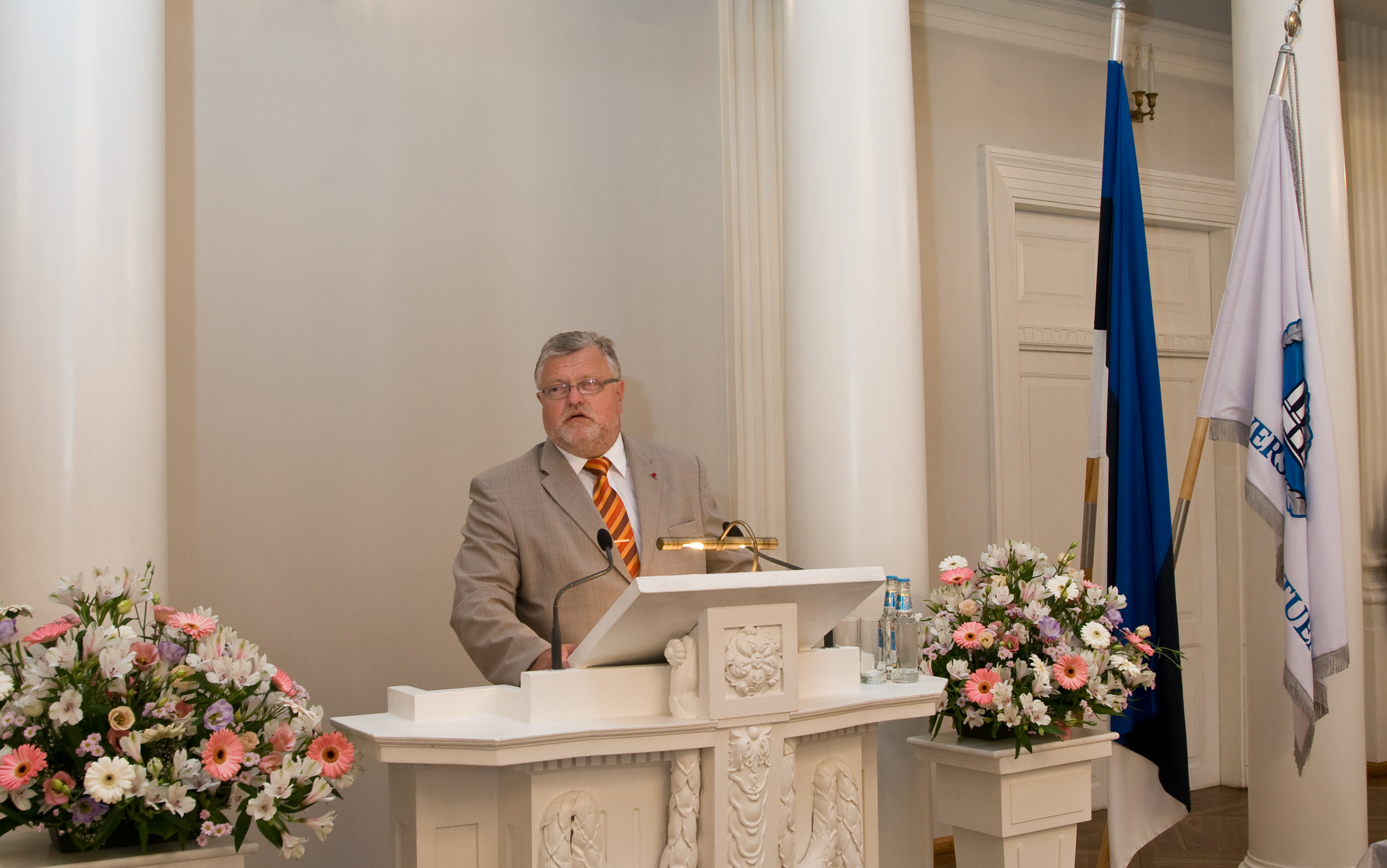
Janno Reiljan

Janno Reiljan (8 October 1951 in Mikita – 23 January 2018) was an Estonian politician, economist and professor of foreign economics at the University of Tartu. He has been a member of IX and X Riigikogu. He was a member of Conservative People's Party of Estonia.

He graduated cum laude in 1975 from Tartu State University (now, University of Tartu), Faculty of Economics in econometrics. He was a member of the Fraternitas Liviensis student organization. In 1980, he defended his doctoral dissertation "Problems of using mathematical-statistical methods in the analysis of companies' economic activities" at Moscow State University.

On 23 January 2018, Reiljan died, aged 66, after an accidental fall from six meters from a spiral staircase, breaking four cervical vertebrae. He was interred at Vana-Jaani cemetery (part of Raadi cemetery) in Tartu. His younger brother is politician Villu Reiljan.
