= Märt Põder =

Estonian philosopher and information freedom activist

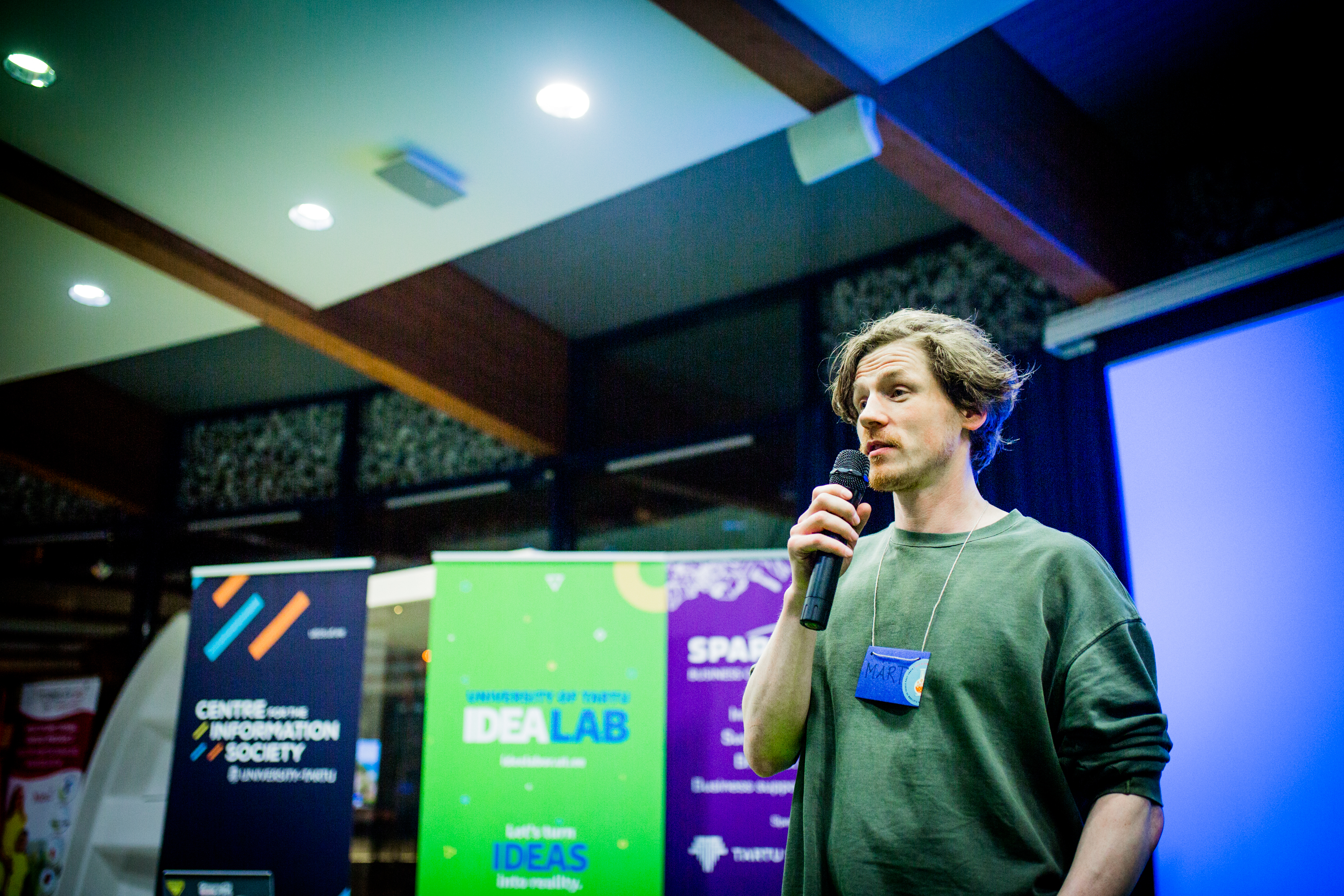
- Märt Põder at the Data as Remedy hackathon, 2017
- Born: 11 September 1979 (age 46); Tartu, Estonia
- Occupations: Philosopher, activist

Signature
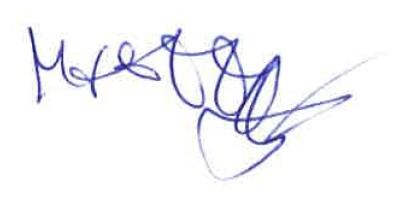

Märt Põder (born 11 September 1979) is an Estonian philosopher, freedom of information activist, presenter, publicist and translator.

== Activities in the field of philosophy ==
Professionally, Põder has worked as a philosophy teacher at the Mart Reinik Gymnasium, as a lecturer at the Tartu High School of Arts and as the head of the philosophy teacher training program at the University of Tartu.

He has primarily studied the history of Platonism, translated Plato, Martin Heidegger and Friedrich Nietzsche and studied the theory of value education. He has given public presentations on, among others, Karl Popper, Immanuel Kant, happiness and the information society, he has spoken in the media on issues critical of society, especially the fundamental values of the information society. He is a member of the philosophy association Frontisterion ("Taipla") and EYS Veljesto.

Põder has also been involved in the promotion of philosophy education in Estonian high schools and he was the head of the philosophy subject working group of the 2011 national curriculum. He is a jury member of the Philosophy Olympiad and has been active in the background research of the national program of value education.

== Activities in the field of information society ==
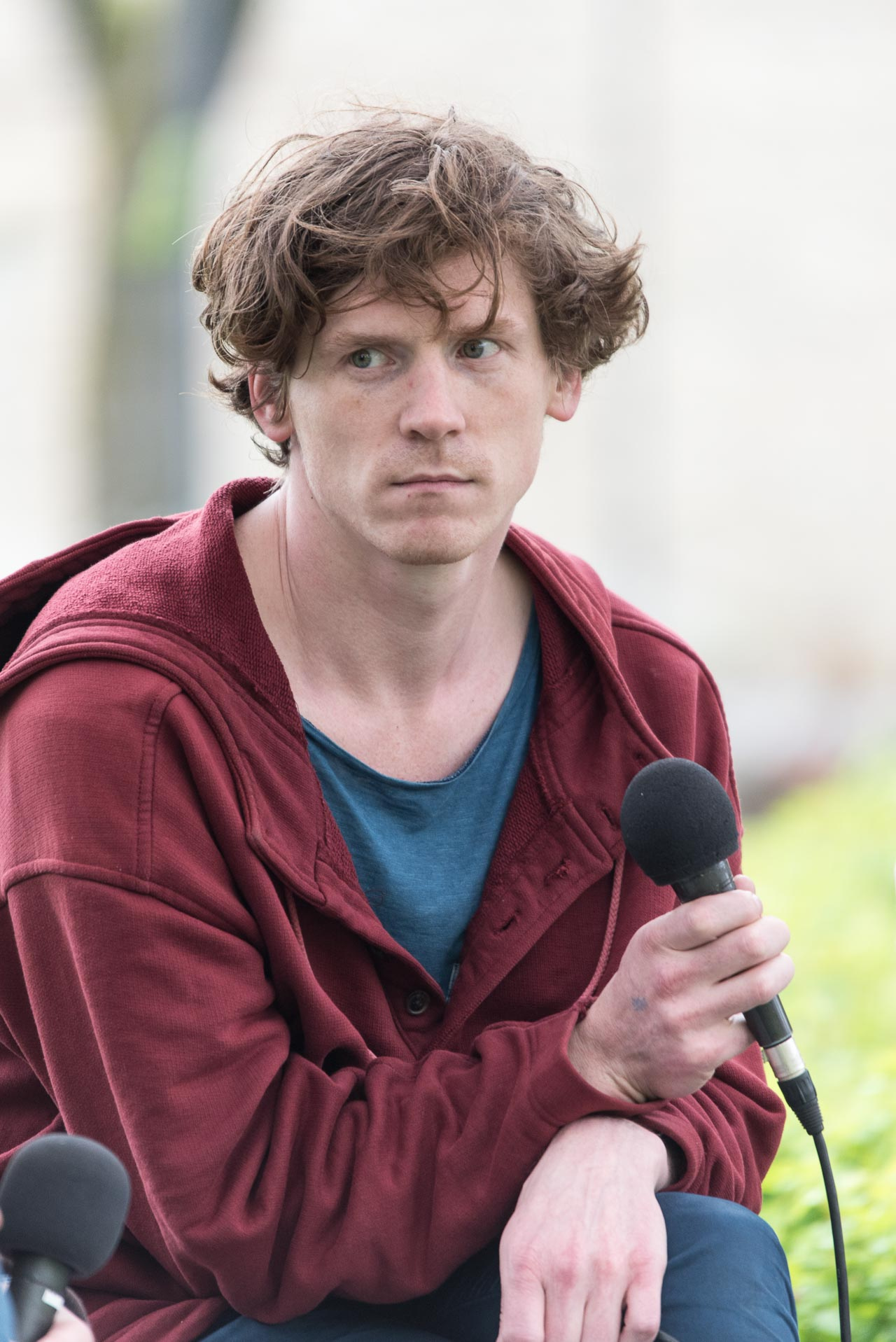
Märt Põder at Narva Arvamusfestival in 2016.

Põder has been active in politics as an activist, especially in the field of information society. He is a founding member of Open Knowledge Estonia and operated under the auspices of the Estonian Pirate Party. He makes the program "The situation in the frog pond" on Generadio together with Ago Gaškov and Raik Sõstra.

In the spring of 2013, he took part in the elections of the University of Tartu student council with a pirate platform and was the third candidate with 212 votes. In the 2013 election of the local government councils, Põder was one of the initiators of the Tartu election union Vabakund, a trustee of the partnership formed for the elections and an advisor to the group of deputies in the Tartu city council. In the 2014 European Parliament elections, he participated in the campaign of the independent candidate Silver Meikar as an employee of his future office responsible for information society issues.

He has been a member of two boards of the Estonian Pirate Party in a row, and the exponent of the association's core values of kopim, openness and dispersion. Põder has been an activist of the free information society since the 1990s, when he participated in the local FidoNet with the address 2:490/222.33 and was the moderator of the EW.KEEL conference.

Põder has been involved in e-voting, e-democracy and open data campaigns and has spoken out to protect anonymity and privacy on the internet. He was one of the initiators of the Estonian anti-ACTA movement at the end of 2011, translating and preparing a brochure which, during a guerilla action, pushed the campaign into motion after being shoved on the table of members of the Riigikogu. In 2015, under the Estonian Green Movement, he led a campaign to inform about the dangers of the TTIP free trade agreement.

As his personal political goal, Põder presents the free distribution of scientific information and materials and the renewal of copyright so that distribution is possible. Since university libraries and other similar institutions do not have enough money to acquire the latest literature in specific fields, according to Põdra, many master's and doctoral theses are written based on "pirated" literature, although the distribution of these materials is punishable. He has recommended transferring the fair trade label to the creative industry as well and created experimental solutions to more fairly evaluate the impact of scientific publications. In the spring of 2016, together with artists interested in remix culture, he initiated a project with the aim of introducing copyright-free music events in order to develop an event format suitable for playing music with Creative Commons and other licenses favoring creative freedom, together with an appropriate remuneration model for authors.

He is known as a promoter of free software and one of the initiators of crypto parties in Estonia. He has been the porter and publisher of Estobuntu, led various projects in the Ubuntu and Debian ecosystems, and coordinated the translation of software for these operating systems. He maintained an upgraded version of the ID card software for Ubuntu in 2010, in 2012 he led the freeware community's negotiations with the Ministry of Economy and Communications to package the ID software according to the requirements of Linux ecosystems, and has highlighted problems with the technical implementation of digital signatures at the ministry level. He participates in the activities of Tartu Häkkerikoda.

From 17 February 2018 to 8 October 2020, he was a member of the board of the NGO Wikimedia Estonia.

Põder ran as an independent candidate in the 2019 Riigikogu elections on the list of the Greens in Ida-Virumaa with the free and cultured information society program of the Estonian Pirate Party, which the Greens added as the last chapter of their program. The Pirate Party also forwarded its information society program recommendations to the Estonian 200 and Elurikkuse Erakonna parties, which also used them in formulating their program. In his campaign, Põder focused on the values of an open information society, the balance of personal and open data, and animal rights, especially the situation of dogs and other pets. His personal election promise was to let himself be chipped if elected to the Riigikoku, and the campaign slogan presented as a solution to Ida-Virumaa's problems was "Data is the new oil shale of Ida-Virumaa". In the elections, he received 44 votes.

== Scholarships ==
- Gustav Teichmüller Scholarship
