= Merry Aart =

Estonian politician

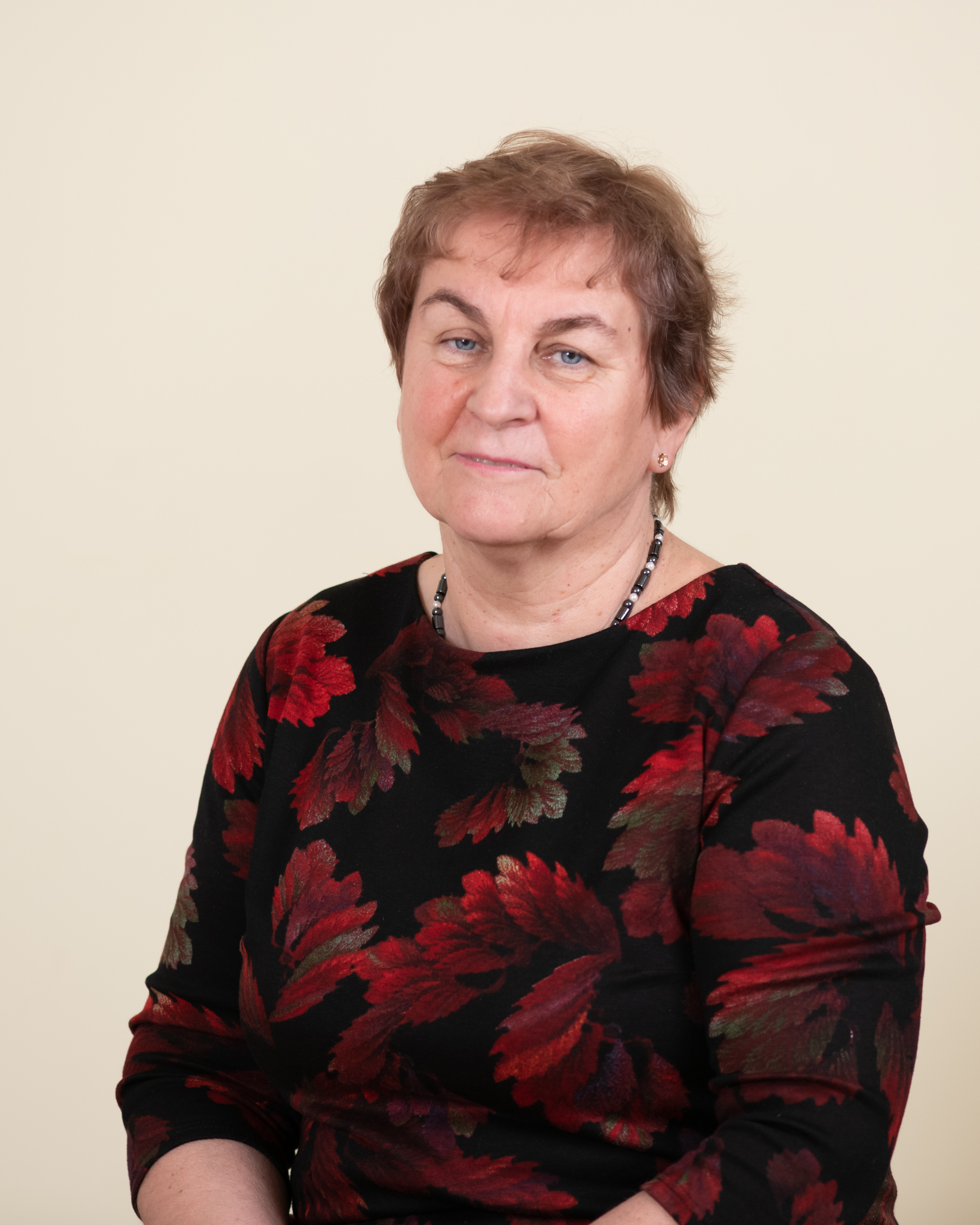
- Aart in 2019

Member of the Riigikogu
- In office 4 April 2019 – 3 April 2023

Personal details
- Born: 31 March 1953 (age 73) Elva, Estonia
- Education: Estonian University of Life Sciences

Merry Aart (born 31 March 1953 in Elva) is an Estonian politician. She is a member of the XIV Riigikogu.

In 1982 she graduated from the Estonian University of Life Sciences with a degree in zoological engineering.

From 1994 to 1999 she was the president of Estonian Association of Rural Consultants.

Since 2013 she has been a member of Conservative People's Party of Estonia.
