= Rain Epler =

Estonian politician (born 1977)

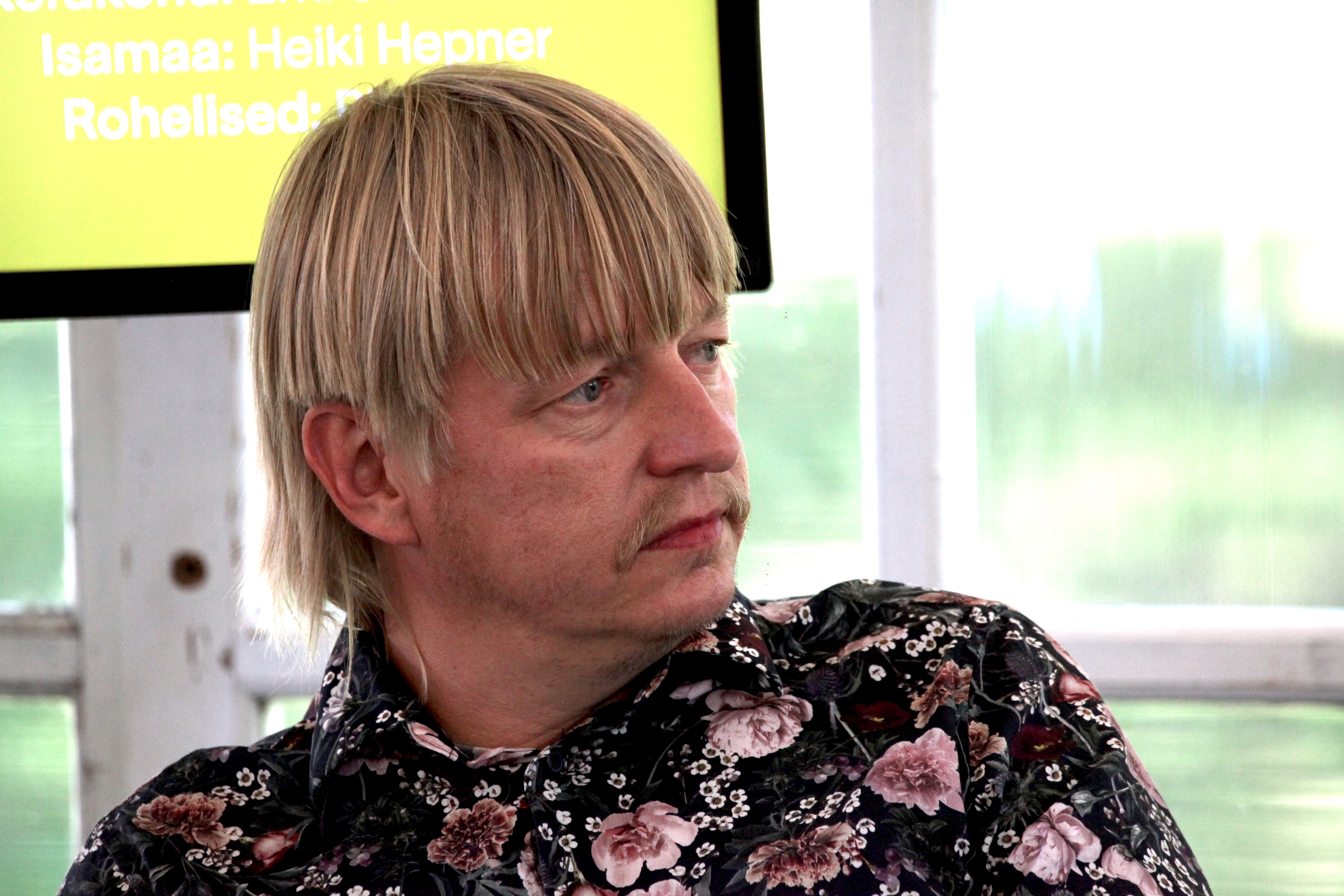
- Epler in 2022

Minister of the Environment
- In office 16 November 2020 – 26 January 2021
- Prime Minister: Jüri Ratas
- Preceded by: Rene Kokk
- Succeeded by: Tõnis Mölder

Personal details
- Born: 6 June 1977 (age 48) Tallinn, then part of Estonian SSR, Soviet Union
- Party: Conservative People's Party of Estonia

Rain Epler (born 6 June 1977) is an Estonian politician and businessman. He served as Minister of the Environment for approximately two months from 2020 to 2021.

== Early life and business career ==
Rain Epler was born in Tallinn on 6 June 1977. He graduated from Johannes Käis Põlva Secondary School in 1995 and then attended the University of Tartu, studying management and foreign economy from 1995 to 2000. He married and had three children.

Epler worked in the insurance industry with several companies. He worked for If P&C Insurance from 1997 to 2003. He then worked as a development manager for Hansa Kindlustusmaakler from 2003 to 2005 and Swedbank from 2005 to 2006. In 2006, he began attending the Estonian Information Technology College and began working as a partnerships manager for Aon. He left the college in 2008 and became Aon's Central and East European IT Manager in 2009. He left Aon in 2012 and worked as sales and marketing manager for RSA Kindlustus from 2012 to 2014. He then worked as a private businessman, and he was head of the Romanian Division of Endover KVB OÜ from 2018 to 2019.

As of 2020, Epler owned the Baltic Fleet Company, the Pühajõe Brewery, and the computer consultation company Kolmejalgne mündiga konn OÜ.

== Political career ==
=== Early political affiliations ===
Epler was a member of the Pro Patria Union from 2000 until 2006, and he ran in the 2017 Estonian municipal elections in Võru as a member of the Estonian Reform Party. He became advisor to the Minister of Finance, Martin Helme, in 2019. This included a seat on the boards for Enterprise Estonia, Kredex, and the State Forest Management Centre.

=== Minister of the Environment ===
Epler joined the Conservative People's Party of Estonia (EKRE) on 30 October 2020, and he was selected to succeed Rene Kokk as Minister of the Environment in Jüri Ratas's second cabinet on 7 November 2020. He was sworn in on 16 November 2020. Epler was not a member of Parliament at the time of his appointment. He expressed support for Kokk's forest management policy, but he did not immediately comment on the state plan after taking office. He also supported deregulation and expressed interest in constructing a nuclear power plant as a means of fossil fuel phase-out. While in office, Epler expressed doubt that climate change is caused by human activity. The Estonian Greens objected to his appointment for this reason.

In November, Epler changed rules surrounding the validity of fishing licenses, making gillnet fishing cards expire seven days after issuance by default instead of at the end of the calendar week. Epler approved a cutting area of 56,381 hectares in December for forest cutting over the next five years, maintaining numbers similar to the previous period. He dismissed the committee tasked with drafting the forestry development plan in December, saying that it was insufficiently focused and that a new committee was needed. Epler left the ministry position following the resignation of the government of Jüri Ratas. Upon leaving office, he granted his two assistants a bonus of 3,000 euros each. Tõnis Mölder was appointed as his successor and formed a new committee replacing the one Epler had dismissed.

=== Post-ministry career ===
In the 2021 local government council elections, Rain Epler was the EKRE mayoral candidate in Võru. He received 221 votes in the elections and was elected to the Võru City Council, where he serves as the chairman of the audit committee. In the 2023 Riigikogu elections, Epler ran as a candidate for EKRE in electoral district number 11, which covers Võru, Valga, and Põlva counties. He represented the EKRE in negotiations to expedite the development of renewable energy in May 2024.

Political offices
Preceded by Rene Kokk	Minister of the Environment; 2020–2021	Succeeded by Tõnis Mölder
