= Rene Kokk =

Estonian politician (born 1980)

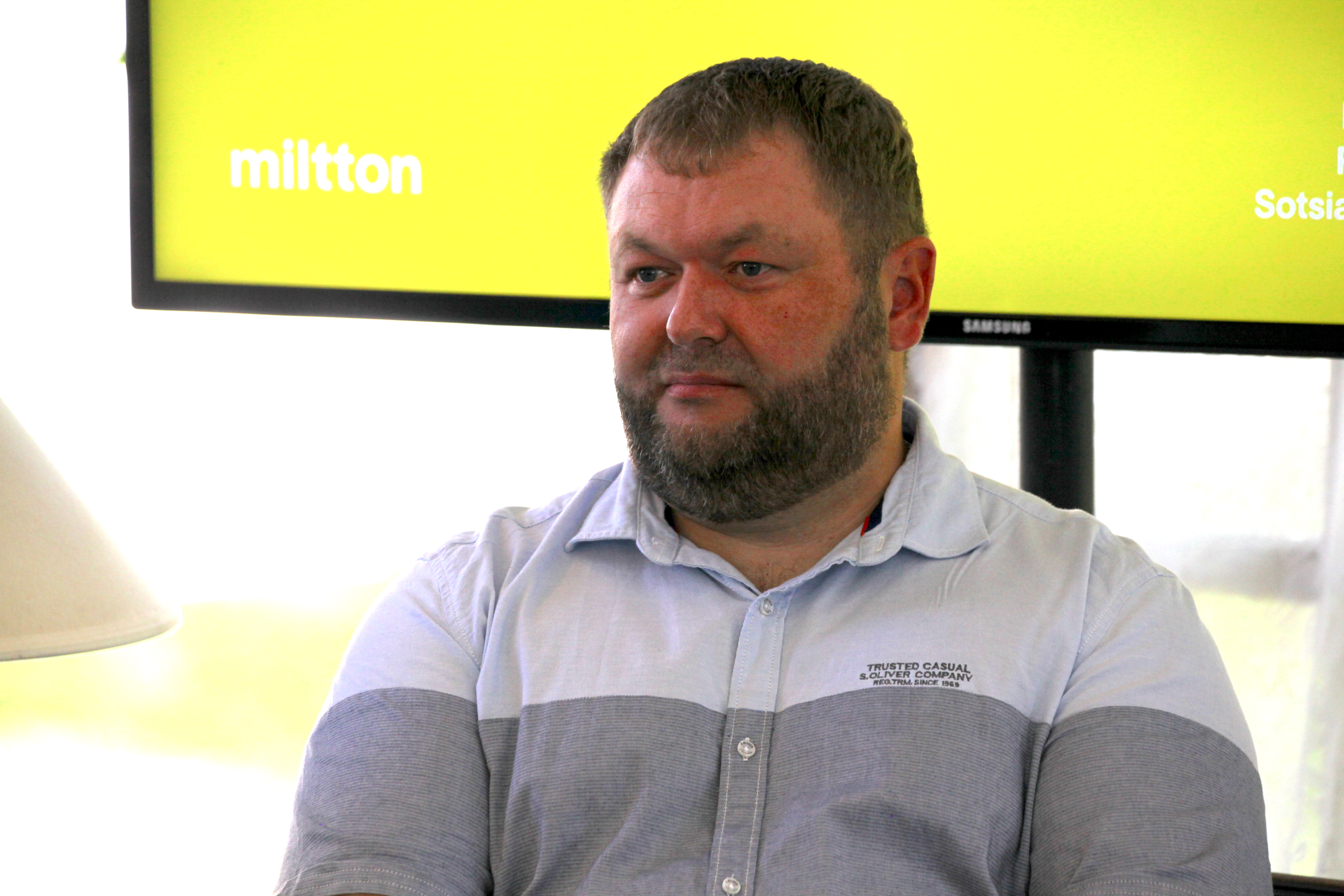

Minister of the Environment
- In office 29 April 2019 – 7 November 2020
- Prime Minister: Jüri Ratas
- Preceded by: Siim Valmar Kiisler
- Succeeded by: Rain Epler

Personal details
- Born: 4 March 1980 (age 46) Rapla, then part of Estonian SSR, Soviet Union
- Party: Conservative People's Party of Estonia
- Education: Estonian University of Life Sciences

Rene Kokk (born 4 March 1980) is an Estonian politician. He served as Minister of the Environment in the second cabinet of Prime Minister Jüri Ratas from 29 April 2019 to 7 November 2020. Rain Epler was appointed as his successor. He is affiliated with the Conservative People's Party of Estonia (EKRE).

Political offices
Preceded by Siim Valmar Kiisler	Minister of the Environment; 2019–2020	Succeeded by Rain Epler
