= Urmas Klaas =

Mayor of Tartu since 2014

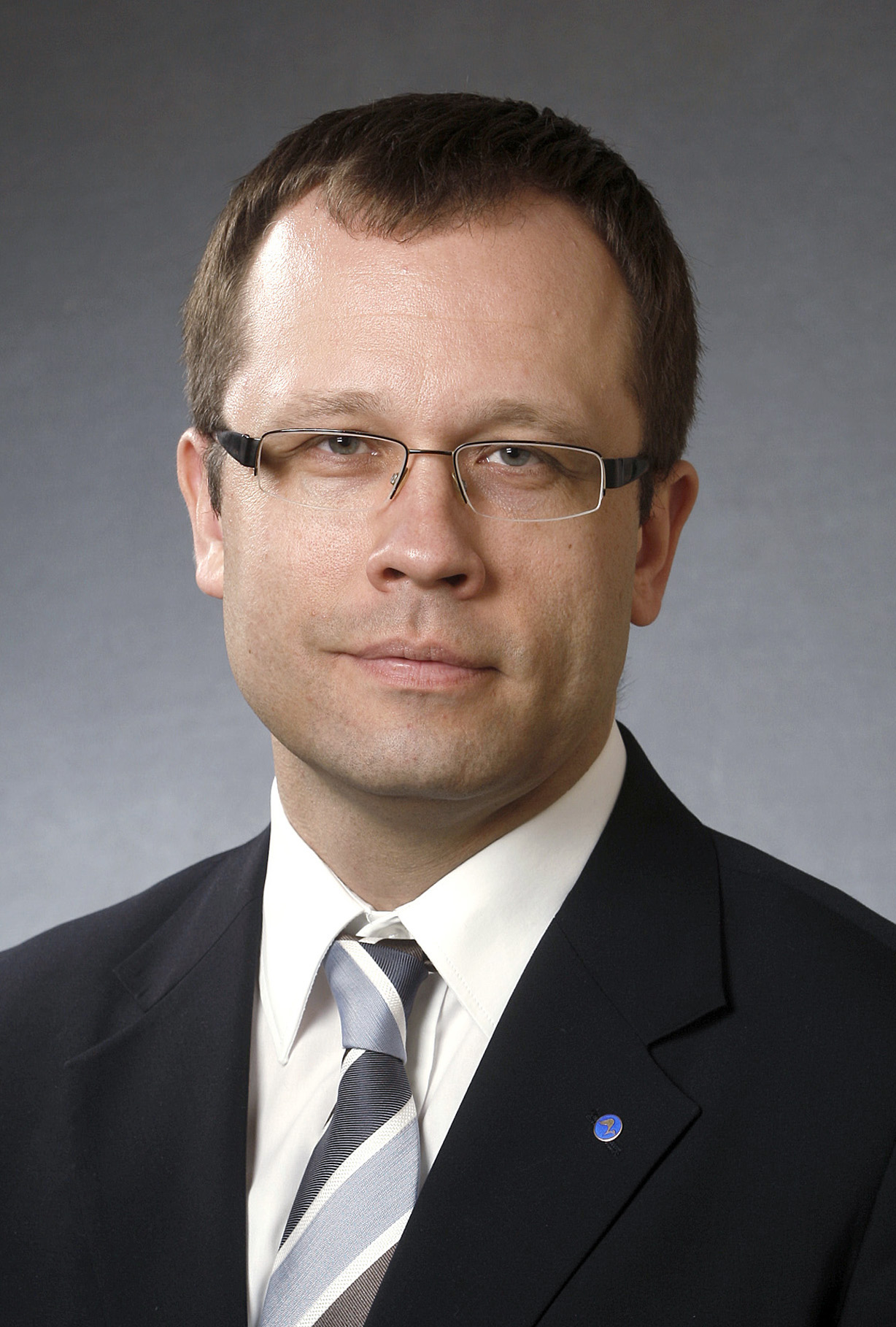
- Klaas in 2021

Mayor of Tartu
- Incumbent
- Assumed office 9 April 2014
- Preceded by: Urmas Kruuse

Member of the Riigikogu
- In office 2007–2014

Personal details
- Born: 17 March 1971 (age 55) Räpina, Estonia
- Party: Reform (since 2006)
- Spouse: Maris Klaas
- Children: 1
- Education: University of Tartu

Urmas Klaas (born 17 March 1971) is an Estonian historian, journalist and politician who has served as the Mayor of Tartu from 9 April 2014.

== Education ==
Urmas Klaas has studied history at the University of Tartu and graduated (cum laude) in 1994.

== Career before politics ==
Klaas worked from 1994 to 2003 as a lector at the University of Tartu. Between 1995 and 2003 he worked first as an editor at Postimees, then as the head of reporting, head of op-eds, deputy editor-in-chief and editor-in-chief. In 2004 he worked at the Estonian Ministry of Education as head of the information management department.

== Political career ==
Urmas Klaas was Governor of Põlva County between 2004 and 2007. From 2007 to 2011 he was a member of the Estonian Parliament, serving as the chairman of the Economic Affairs Committee. From 2011 to 2014 he served as chairman of the Committee of Education and Culture. He has been a member of the Estonian Reform Party since 2006.

On 8 April 2014 Urmas Klaas was elected Mayor of Tartu by the Tartu City Council. To take office, he resigned from parliament. On 19 May 2014 he was also elected leader of the Reform Party's Tartu region.

In 2023 he ran for parliament and got the 5th best result of all candidates nationwide, thus being elected. He chose to not take up his seat to continue as mayor.

Klaas has served as a member of the European Committee of the Regions since 2020. He belongs to the Committee of Social Policy, Education, Employment and Culture (SEDEC), Ukraine support group and is a member of the Renew Europe group. He is a Vice President of the European Committee of the Regions.

== Personal life ==
Urmas Klaas is married to Maris Klaas, who works as head of exhibitions at the Estonian National Museum. They have one daughter, Ida. The family lives in Tartu.

Klaas speaks Estonian, English, German and Russian.
