= Andrus Seeme =

Estonian politician (born 1969)

Andrus Seeme (born 8 November 1969 in Põlva) is an Estonian politician. He is a member of the XIV Riigikogu.

In 1993 he graduated from Estonian University of Life Sciences specializing in agronomy.

From 2001 to 2017 he was the mayor of Kõlleste Rural Municipality. From 2017 to 2019 he was the mayor of Kanepi Rural Municipality.

Since 2002 he has been a member of the Estonian Reform Party.
