= Priit Sibul =

Estonian politician (born 1977)

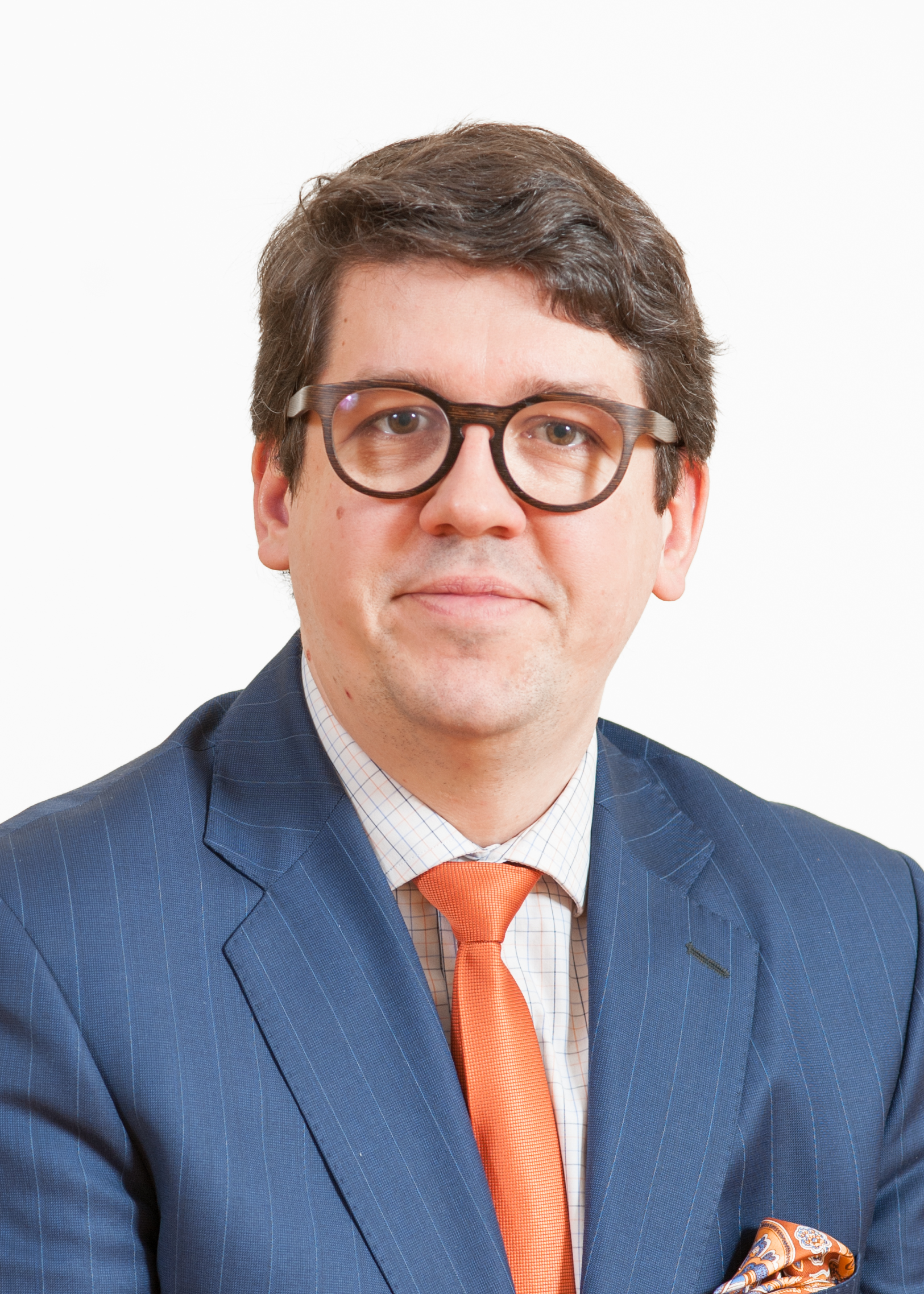

Personal details
- Born: December 31, 1977 (age 48) Valga, then part of Estonian SSR, Soviet Union
- Occupation: Politician

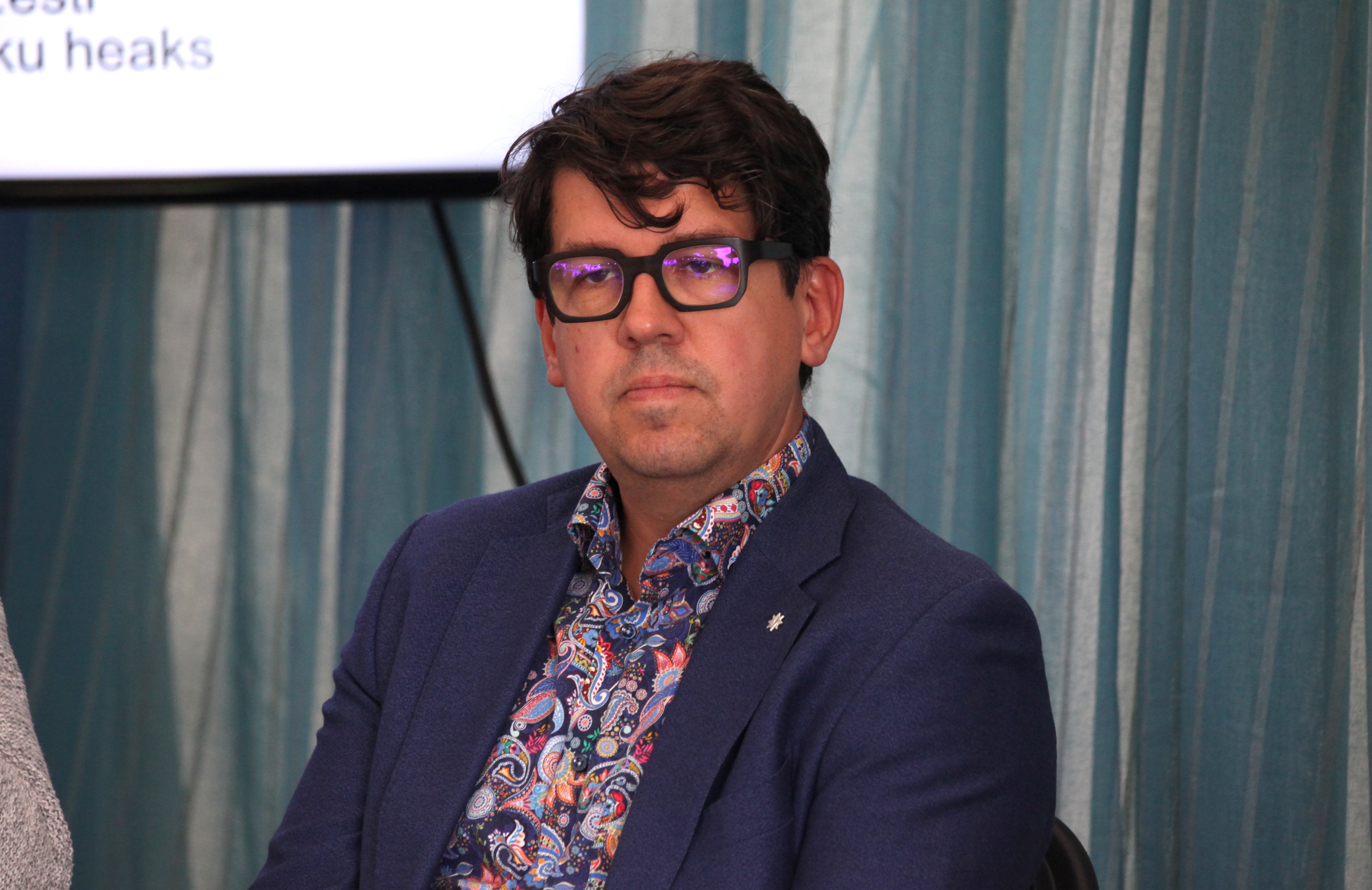
Priit Sibul at the Opinion Festival 2021 in Paide, Estonia

Priit Sibul (born 31 December 1977 in Valga) is an Estonian politician, member of the Riigikogu, and Secretary General of the Pro Patria and Res Publica Union.
