= Arvo Aller =

Estonian politician (born 1973)

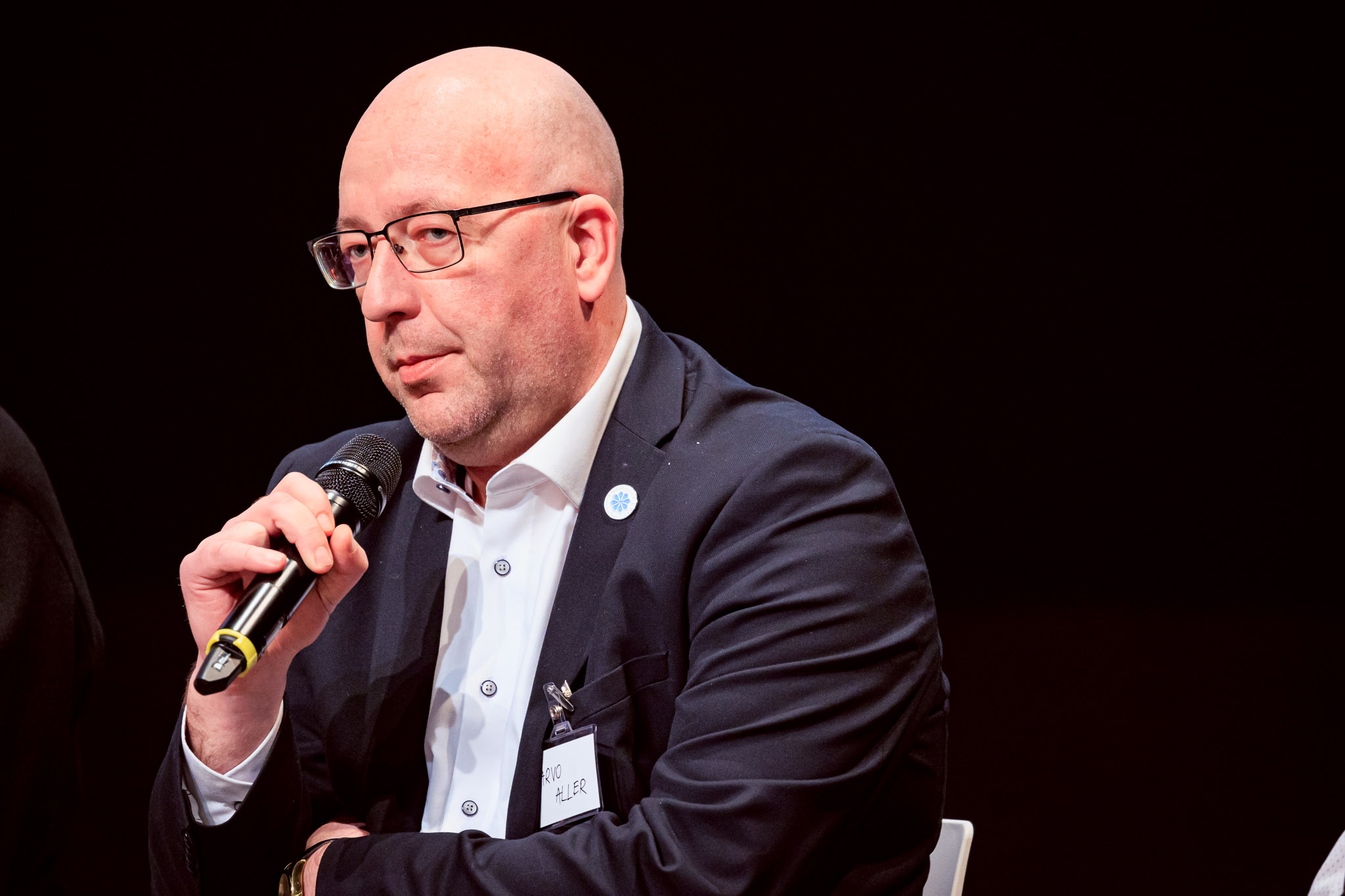

Minister of Rural Affairs
- In office 10 December 2019 – 26 January 2021
- Prime Minister: Jüri Ratas
- Preceded by: Mart Järvik
- Succeeded by: Urmas Kruuse

Vice Chairman of the Riigikogu
- Incumbent
- Assumed office 15 July 2024

Personal details
- Born: 28 July 1973 (age 53) Kohtla-Järve, then part of Estonian SSR, Soviet Union
- Party: Conservative People's Party of Estonia
- Education: Estonian Agricultural University; Tallinn University of Technology

Arvo Aller (born 28 July 1973) is an Estonian politician. He served as Ministry of Rural Affairs in the second cabinet of Prime Minister Jüri Ratas from 10 December 2019 to 26 January 2021. Urmas Kruuse was appointed as his successor. He is affiliated with the Conservative People's Party of Estonia (EKRE).

Political offices
Preceded by Mart Järvik	Minister of Rural Affairs; 2019–2021	Succeeded by Urmas Kruuse
