= Tarmo Tamm (politician, born 1966) =

Estonian politician

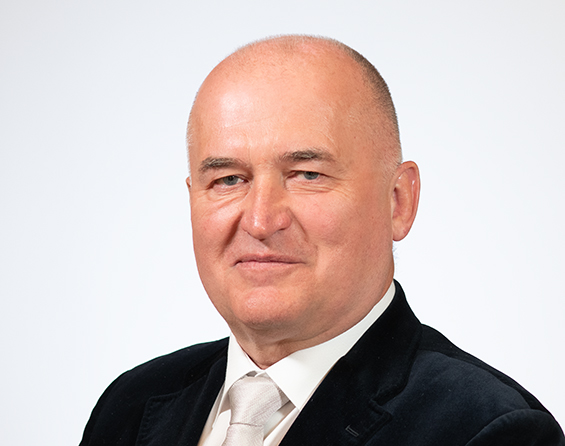

Personal details
- Born: 27 July 1966 (age 59) Tallinn, then part of Estonian SSR, Soviet Union
- Occupation: Politician

Tarmo Tamm (born 27 July 1966) is an Estonian wood industry entrepreneur and a member of the XV Riigikogu.

In the 2023 Riigikogu elections, he was elected to the Riigikogu on the list of the Estonian 200 political party, collecting 876 votes from the 6th constituency in Lääne-Viru County.

== Biography ==
Tamm was born in Tallinn. He graduated from the Kirov Agricultural Academy in 1991 with a degree in hunting biology and from the Estonian Business School international business management programme in 1996.

1991–1995 – Deputy Director of the Mahtra State Hunting Area.

1997–2000 – member of the board of AS Estimpeks Puit.

2000–2008 – member of the board of OÜ TreTimber (now Thermory).

2000–2003 – shareholder and member of the board of OÜ Peetri Puit. He also represented the non-profit organization Käsmu Majaka Sadam until May 8, 2023, and is a shareholder and board member of the company Arcwood.

From 19 April 2023, he was the chairman of the Environment Committee of the Riigikogu, but was replaced by Züleyxa Izmailova on 2 June of the same year in connection with two misdemeanour proceedings and one administrative proceeding initiated against Tamme by the Environmental Board.

Tarmo Tamm is unmarried with two children.
