= Uno Kaskpeit =

Estonian politician

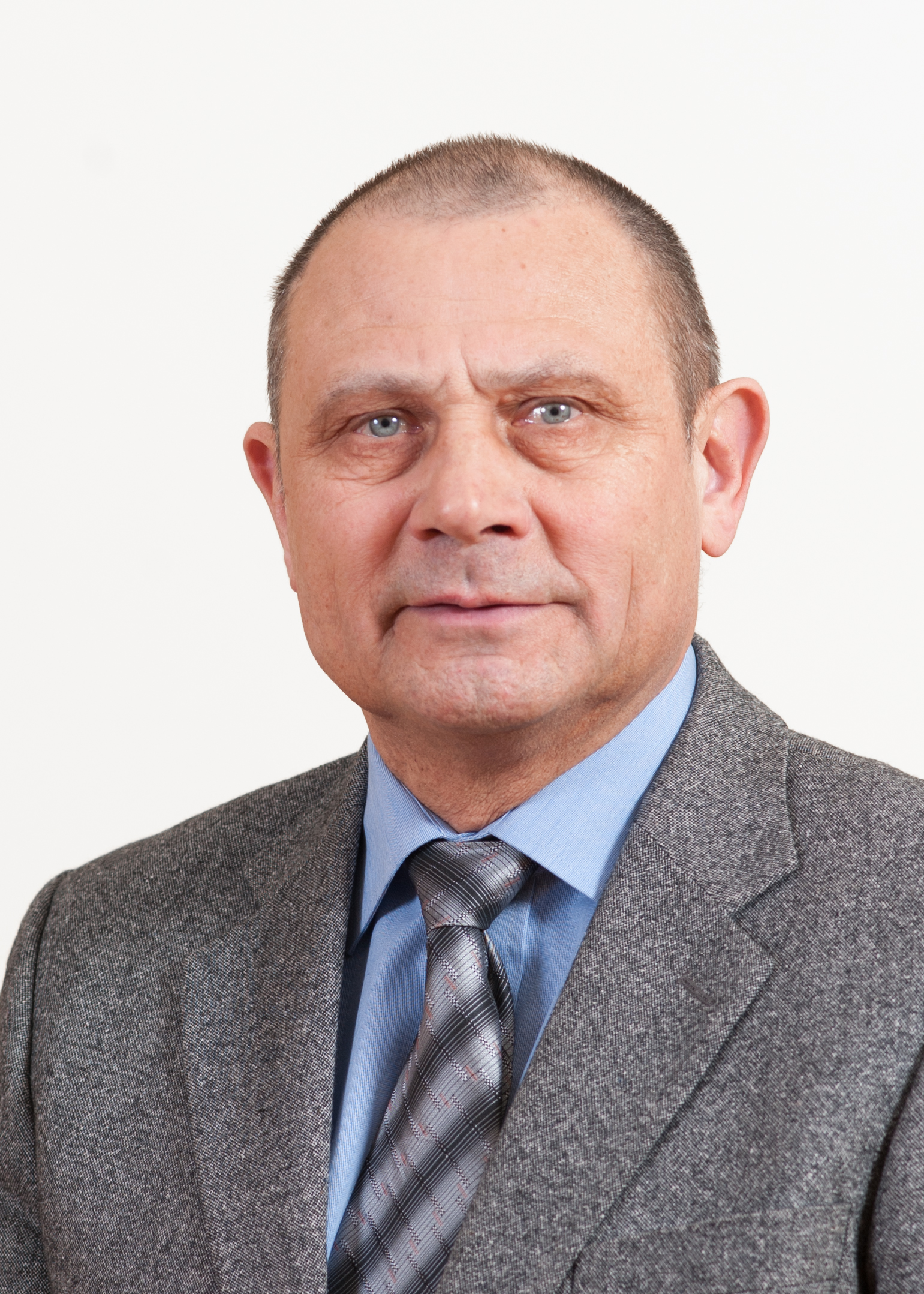
Uno Kaskpeit

Uno Kaskpeit (born 8 June 1957 in Valga) is an Estonian politician. He has been a member of the XIII Riigikogu and XIV Riigikogu.

In 2000 he graduated from Estonian Academy of Security Sciences specializing as a border guard. In 2006 Kaskpeidi Unn graduated from Tallinn University with a degree in organisational behaviour.

Since 2015 he has been a member of the Conservative People's Party of Estonia.
