= Tarmo Tamm =

Estonian politician (born 1953)

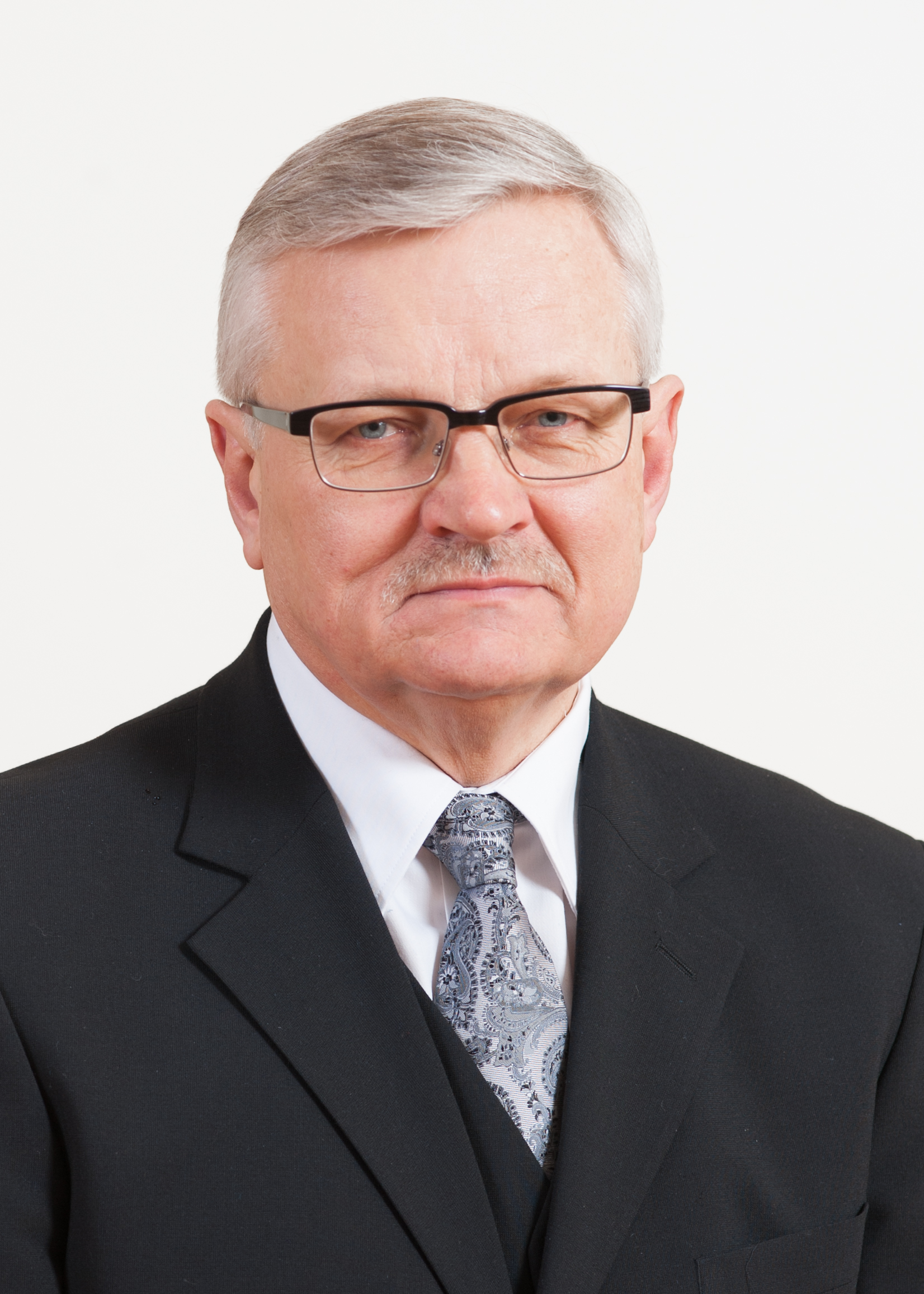
Tarmo Tamm in 2015.

Tarmo Tamm (born 3 December 1953 in Kiuma, Põlva County) is an Estonian politician. He has been a member of the XII, XIII and XIV Riigikogu.

In 2007 he graduated from Estonian University of Life Sciences as an agricultural economist.

From 1999 to 2011 he was the mayor of Põlva.

Since 2002 he has been a member of Estonian Centre Party.

Political offices
Preceded by Martin Repinski	Minister of Rural Affairs; 2016–2019	Succeeded by Mart Järvik
