= Members of the 13th Riigikogu =

Members of Parliament of Estonia 2015–2019

The seat plan of 13th Riigikogu after the 2015 parliamentary elections

This is a list of the members of the Riigikogu, following the 2015 election.

== Election results ==
Party	Votes	%	Seats	+/–
Estonian Reform Party	158,970	27.7	30	–3
Estonian Centre Party	142,458	24.8	27	+1
Social Democratic Party	87,189	15.2	15	–4
Pro Patria and Res Publica Union	78,699	13.7	14	–9
Free Party	49,882	8.7	8	New
Conservative People's Party	46,772	8.1	7	+7
Estonian Greens	5,193	0.9	0	0
Party of People's Unity	2,289	0.4	0	New
Estonian Independence Party	1,047	0.2	0	0
Estonian United Left Party	764	0.1	0	New
Independents	887	0.2	0	0
Invalid/blank votes	3,760	–	–	–
Total	577,910	100	101	0
Registered voters/turnout	899,793	64.2	–	–
Source: VVK

== Lists ==
=== By party ===
==== Estonian Reform Party (30) ====
Name	Constituency
Arto Aas	Kesklinn, Lasnamäe and Pirita
Yoko Alender	Harju and Rapla
Deniss Boroditš	Ida-Viru
Igor Gräzin	Jõgeva and Tartu
Jüri Jaanson	Pärnu
Liina Kersna	Võru, Valga and Põlva
Johannes Kert	Järva and Viljandi
Toomas Kivimägi	Pärnu
Urmas Klaas	Tartu
Urmas Kruuse	Jõgeva and Tartu
Martin Kukk	Mustamäe and Nõmme
Ants Laaneots	Tartu
Kalle Laanet	Hiiu, Lääne and Saare
Maris Lauri	Mustamäe and Nõmme
Jürgen Ligi	Järva and Viljandi
Lauri Luik	Hiiu, Lääne and Saare
Kristen Michal	Haabersti, Põhja-Tallinn and Kristiine
Madis Milling	Harju and Rapla
Urmas Paet	Mustamäe and Nõmme
Kalle Palling	Harju and Rapla
Keit Pentus-Rosimannus	Kesklinn, Lasnamäe and Pirita
Hanno Pevkur	Võru, Valga and Põlva
Heidy Purga	Haabersti, Põhja-Tallinn and Kristiine
Laine Randjärv	Harju and Rapla
Valdo Randpere	Lääne-Viru
Taavi Rõivas	Harju and Rapla
Anne Sulling	Tartu
Aivar Sõerd	Harju and Rapla
Urve Tiidus	Hiiu, Lääne and Saare
Terje Trei	Jõgeva and Tartu

==== Estonian Centre Party (27) ====
Name	Constituency
Enn Eesmaa	Hiiu, Lääne and Saare
Olga Ivanova	Kesklinn, Lasnamäe and Pirita
Kalev Kallo	Haabersti, Põhja-Tallinn and Kristiine
Mihhail Korb	Kesklinn, Lasnamäe and Pirita
Valeri Korb	Ida-Viru
Siret Kotka	Lääne-Viru
Mihhail Kõlvart	Haabersti, Põhja-Tallinn and Kristiine
Lauri Laasi	Haabersti, Põhja-Tallinn and Kristiine
Heimar Lenk	Võru, Valga and Põlva
Aadu Must	Tartu
Jüri Ratas	Harju and Rapla
Rein Ratas	Mustamäe and Nõmme
Martin Repinski	Ida-Viru
Mailis Reps	Järva and Viljandi
Kersti Sarapuu	Järva and Viljandi
Edgar Savisaar	Kesklinn, Lasnamäe and Pirita
Erki Savisaar	Mustamäe and Nõmme
Kadri Simson	Pärnu
Mihhail Stalnuhhin	Ida-Viru
Märt Sults	Haabersti, Põhja-Tallinn and Kristiine
Tarmo Tamm	Võru, Valga and Põlva
Priit Toobal	Järva and Viljandi
Yana Toom	Ida-Viru
Marika Tuus-Laul	Jõgeva and Tartu
Viktor Vassiljev	Haabersti, Põhja-Tallinn and Kristiine
Vladimir Velman	Harju and Rapla
Toomas Vitsut	Kesklinn, Lasnamäe and Pirita

==== Social Democratic Party (15) ====
Name	Constituency
Andres Anvelt	Kesklinn, Lasnamäe and Pirita
Kalev Kotkas	Hiiu, Lääne and Saare
Helmen Kütt	Järva and Viljandi
Kalvi Kõva	Võru, Valga and Põlva
Jaanus Marrandi	Järva and Viljandi
Sven Mikser	Harju and Rapla
Eiki Nestor	Haabersti, Põhja-Tallinn and Kristiine
Marianne Mikko	Haabersti, Põhja-Tallinn and Kristiine
Ivari Padar	Võru, Valga and Põlva
Urve Palo	Harju and Rapla
Heljo Pikhof	Tartu
Toomas Jürgenstein	Tartu
Indrek Saar	Pärnu
Tanel Talve	Jõgeva and Tartu
Rainer Vakra	Mustamäe and Nõmme

==== Pro Patria and Res Publica Union (14) ====
Name	Constituency
Jaak Aaviksoo	Jõgeva and Tartu
Raivo Aeg	Hiiu, Lääne and Saare
Maire Aunaste	Võru, Valga and Põlva
Aivar Kokk	Jõgeva and Tartu
Viktoria Ladõnskaja	Kesklinn, Lasnamäe and Pirita
Andres Metsoja	Pärnu
Marko Mihkelson	Harju and Rapla
Juhan Parts	Harju and Rapla
Marko Pomerants	Lääne-Viru
Urmas Reinsalu	Mustamäe and Nõmme
Helir-Valdor Seeder	Järva and Viljandi
Priit Sibul	Võru, Valga and Põlva
Margus Tsahkna	Tartu
Ken-Marti Vaher	Haabersti, Põhja-Tallinn and Kristiine

==== Free Party (8) ====
Name	Constituency
Jüri Adams	Tartu
Andres Ammas	Hiiu, Lääne and Saare
Krista Aru	Tartu
Monika Haukanõmm	Kesklinn, Lasnamäe and Pirita
Andres Herkel	Kesklinn, Lasnamäe and Pirita
Külliki Kübarsepp	Haabersti, Põhja-Tallinn and Kristiine
Ain Lutsepp	Mustamäe and Nõmme
Artur Talvik	Harju and Rapla

==== Conservative People's Party (7) ====
Name	Constituency
Mart Helme	Pärnu
Martin Helme	Mustamäe and Nõmme
Uno Kaskpeit	Võru, Valga and Põlva
Jaak Madison	Järva and Viljandi
Raivo Põldaru	Jõgeva and Tartu
Henn Põlluaas	Harju and Rapla
Arno Sild	Võru, Valga and Põlva

=== By votes ===
	Name	Votes	Party
1.	Edgar Savisaar	25,055	Kesk
2.	Taavi Rõivas	15,881	Ref
3.	Yana Toom	11,574	Kesk
4.	Mihhail Kõlvart	10,996	Kesk
5.	Jüri Ratas	7,932	Kesk
6.	Urmas Paet	7,868	Ref
7.	Toomas Kivimägi	7,603	Ref
8.	Artur Talvik	7,308	EVA
9.	Jürgen Ligi	6,757	Ref
10.	Mart Helme	6,714	EKRE
Source: VVK
