= Riigikogu electoral district no. 12 =

Electoral district of Estonia

Electoral district no. 12
- Valimisringkond nr 12
- Electoral District for the Riigikogu
- Location of Electoral district no. 12 within Estonia
- County: Pärnu
- Population: 86,185 (2020)
- Electorate: 66,852 (2019)

Current Electoral District
- Created: 1992
- Seats: List: 7 (2019–present); 8 (1995–2019); 9 (1992–1995)
- Member of the Riigikogu: List: Annely Akkermann (RE); Mart Helme (EKRE); Jüri Jaanson (RE); Toomas Kivimägi (RE); Andres Metsoja (I); Marko Šorin (K)

Electoral district no. 12 (Estonian: Valimisringkond nr 12) is one of the 12 multi-member electoral districts of the Riigikogu, the national legislature of Estonia. The district was established in 1992 when the Riigikogu was re-established following Estonia's independence from the Soviet Union. It was renamed electoral district no. 11 in 1995 following the re-organisation of electoral districts but reverted to electoral district no. 12 in 2003. It is conterminous with the county of Pärnu. The district currently elects seven of the 101 members of the Riigikogu using the open party-list proportional representation electoral system. At the 2019 parliamentary election it had 66,852 registered electors.

== Electoral system ==
Electoral district no. 12 currently elects seven of the 101 members of the Riigikogu using the open party-list proportional representation electoral system. The allocation of seats is carried out in three stages. In the first stage, any individual candidate, regardless of whether they are a party or independent candidate, who receives more votes than the district's simple quota (Hare quota: valid votes in district/number of seats allocated to district) is elected via a personal mandate. In the second stage, district mandates are allocated to parties by dividing their district votes by the district's simple quota. Only parties that reach the 5% national threshold compete for district mandates and any personal mandates won by the party are subtracted from the party's district mandates. Prior to 2003 if a party's surplus/remainder votes was equal to or greater than 75% of the district's simple quota it received one additional district mandate. Any unallocated district seats are added to a national pool of compensatory seats. In the final stage, compensatory mandates are calculated based on the national vote and using a modified D'Hondt method. Only parties that reach the 5% national threshold compete for compensatory seats and any personal and district mandates won by the party are subtracted from the party's compensatory mandates. Though calculated nationally, compensatory mandates are allocated at the district level.

=== Seats ===
Seats allocated to electoral district no. 12 by the National Electoral Committee of Estonia at each election was as follows:

- 2023 - 7
- 2019 - 7
- 2015 - 8
- 2011 - 8
- 2007 - 8
- 2003 - 8
- 1999 - 8
- 1995 - 8
- 1992 - 9

== Election results ==
=== Summary ===
| Election | Left EÜVP/EVP/ESDTP/Õ/V | | | Constitution K/EÜRP/MKOE | | | Social Democrats SDE/RM/M | | | Greens EER/NJ/R | | | Centre K/R | | | Reform RE | | | Isamaa I/IRL/I/I\ERSP/I | | | Conservative People's EKRE/ERL/EME/KMÜ | | |
| Election | Votes | % | Seats | Votes | % | Seats | Votes | % | Seats | Votes | % | Seats | Votes | % | Seats | Votes | % | Seats | Votes | % | Seats | Votes | % | Seats |
|---|---|---|---|---|---|---|---|---|---|---|---|---|---|---|---|---|---|---|---|---|---|---|---|---|
| 2023 | 288 | 0.66% | | | | | 2,938 | 6.70% | 0 | 350 | 0.80% | 0 | 5,006 | 11.41% | 1 | 12,955 | 29.53% | 2 | 4,375 | 9.97% | 0 | 11,575 | 28.08% | 2 |
| 2019 | 41 | 0.10% | | | | | 2,780 | 6.75% | 0 | 506 | 1.23% | 0 | 7,913 | 19.20% | 1 | 10,860 | 26.35% | 2 | 5,045 | 12.24% | 1 | 11,575 | 28.08% | 2 |
| 2015 | 21 | 0.05% | | | | | 4,641 | 11.76% | 1 | 251 | 0.64% | 0 | 7,544 | 19.12% | 1 | 11,412 | 28.92% | 2 | 5,337 | 13.53% | 1 | 7,188 | 18.22% | 1 |
| 2011 | | | | | | | 5,041 | 12.52% | 1 | 4,344 | 10.79% | 0 | 7,022 | 17.44% | 1 | 11,480 | 28.52% | 2 | 8,798 | 21.86% | 1 | 839 | 2.08% | 0 |
| 2007 | 43 | 0.11% | | 135 | 0.34% | 0 | 4,285 | 10.82% | 1 | 3,232 | 8.16% | 0 | 8,823 | 22.28% | 2 | 11,003 | 27.78% | 2 | 7,854 | 19.83% | 1 | 3,271 | 8.26% | 0 |
| 2003 | 148 | 0.41% | | 491 | 1.36% | 0 | 2,357 | 6.54% | 0 | | | | 8,243 | 22.86% | 2 | 4,570 | 12.67% | 1 | 3,138 | 8.70% | 0 | 5,611 | 15.56% | 1 |
| 1999 | | | | 604 | 1.65% | 0 | 3,915 | 10.71% | 0 | | | | 8,713 | 23.83% | 1 | 4,747 | 12.98% | 1 | 4,760 | 13.02% | 1 | 3,633 | 9.94% | 0 |
| 1995 | 1,162 | 2.61% | | 660 | 1.49% | 0 | 1,718 | 3.87% | 0 | 342 | 0.77% | 0 | 6,689 | 15.05% | 1 | 7,026 | 15.81% | 1 | 2,427 | 5.46% | 0 | 18,670 | 42.01% | 3 |
| 1992 | 1,055 | 2.62% | | | | | 1,324 | 3.29% | 0 | 370 | 0.92% | 0 | 6,770 | 16.82% | 1 | | | | 10,061 | 24.99% | 2 | | | |

(Excludes compensatory seats)

=== Detailed ===
Party has received at least 5% of the vote nationally and is entitled to compete for district seats.

==== 2023 ====
Results of the 2023 parliamentary election held on 5 March 2023:

| Party | | Votes | | | Total Votes | % | Seats | | | |
| Party | | Pärnu | Expat- riates | Elec- tronic | Total Votes | % | Per. | Dis. | Com. | Tot. |
|---|---|---|---|---|---|---|---|---|---|---|
| Estonian Reform Party | REF | 4,983 | 29 | 7,747 | 12,955 | 29.53% | 0 | 2 | 0 | 2 |
| Conservative People's Party of Estonia | EKRE | 8,403 | 111 | 2,727 | 11,398 | 25.98% | 0 | 2 | 0 | 2 |
| Estonia 200 | EE200 | 2,344 | 15 | 3,193 | 5,611 | 12.79% | 0 | 1 | 1 | 2 |
| Estonian Centre Party | KESK | 3,324 | 0 | 1,618 | 5,006 | 11.41% | 0 | 1 | 0 | 1 |
| Isamaa | IE | 2,427 | 9 | 1,887 | 4,375 | 9.97% | 0 | 0 | 1 | 1 |
| Social Democratic Party | SDE | 1,396 | 6 | 1,499 | 2,938 | 6.70% | 0 | 0 | 0 | 0 |
| Parempoolsed | | 462 | 1 | 474 | 951 | 2.17% | 0 | 0 | 0 | 0 |
| Estonian Greens | EER | 157 | 4 | 181 | 350 | 0.80% | 0 | 0 | 0 | 0 |
| Estonian United Left Party | EÜVP | 225 | 2 | 58 | 288 | 0.66% | 0 | 0 | 0 | 0 |
| Valid votes | | 23,721 | 177 | 19,384 | 43,872 | 100.00% | 0 | 6 | 2 | 8 |
| Rejected votes | | 230 | 7 | 0 | 241 | 0.55% | | | | |
| Total polled | | 23,951 | 184 | 19,384 | 44,113 | 62.13% | | | | |
| Registered electors | | 64,620 | 6,383 | | 71,003 | | | | | |

The following candidates were elected:

- District mandates - Annely Akkermann (REF), 4,381 votes; Mart Helme (EKRE), 6,130 votes; Toomas Kivimägi (REF), 4,099 votes; Andrei Korobeinik (KESK), 1,973 votes; Alar Laneman (EKRE), 1,802 votes; and Kadri Tali (EE200), 2,092 votes.
- Compensatory mandates - Andres Metsoja (IE), 1,607 votes; and Peeter Tali (EE200), 1,159 votes.

==== 2019 ====
Results of the 2019 parliamentary election held on 3 March 2019:

| Party | | Votes | | | Total Votes | % | Seats | | | |
| Party | | Pärnu | Expat- riates | Elec- tronic | Total Votes | % | Per. | Dis. | Com. | Tot. |
|---|---|---|---|---|---|---|---|---|---|---|
| Conservative People's Party of Estonia | EKRE | 8,116 | 100 | 3,359 | 11,575 | 28.08% | 1 | 1 | 0 | 2 |
| Estonian Reform Party | RE | 5,165 | 36 | 5,659 | 10,860 | 26.35% | 0 | 2 | 1 | 3 |
| Estonian Centre Party | K | 5,855 | 12 | 2,046 | 7,913 | 19.20% | 0 | 1 | 0 | 1 |
| Isamaa | I | 2,827 | 16 | 2,202 | 5,045 | 12.24% | 0 | 1 | 0 | 1 |
| Social Democratic Party | SDE | 1,503 | 9 | 1,268 | 2,780 | 6.75% | 0 | 0 | 0 | 0 |
| Estonia 200 | | 683 | 10 | 697 | 1,390 | 3.37% | 0 | 0 | 0 | 0 |
| Estonian Biodiversity Party | | 277 | 4 | 343 | 624 | 1.51% | 0 | 0 | 0 | 0 |
| Estonian Greens | EER | 258 | 5 | 243 | 506 | 1.23% | 0 | 0 | 0 | 0 |
| Estonian Free Party | EVA | 277 | 4 | 200 | 481 | 1.17% | 0 | 0 | 0 | 0 |
| Estonian United Left Party | EÜVP | 29 | 1 | 11 | 41 | 0.10% | 0 | 0 | 0 | 0 |
| Valid votes | | 24,990 | 197 | 16,028 | 41,215 | 100.00% | 1 | 5 | 1 | 7 |
| Rejected votes | | 206 | 1 | 0 | 207 | 0.50% | | | | |
| Total polled | | 25,196 | 198 | 16,028 | 41,422 | 61.96% | | | | |
| Registered electors | | 66,278 | 574 | | 66,852 | | | | | |

The following candidates were elected:

- Personal mandates - Mart Helme (EKRE), 9,170 votes.
- District mandates - Annely Akkermann (RE), 2,397 votes; Toomas Kivimägi (RE), 5,202 votes; Alar Laneman (EKRE), 673 votes; Andres Metsoja (I), 2,228 votes; and Kadri Simson (K), 5,741 votes.
- Compensatory mandates - Jüri Jaanson (RE), 1,139 votes.

==== 2015 ====
Results of the 2015 parliamentary election held on 1 March 2015:

| Party | | Votes | | | Total Votes | % | Seats | | | |
| Party | | Pärnu | Expat- riates | Elec- tronic | Total Votes | % | Per. | Dis. | Com. | Tot. |
|---|---|---|---|---|---|---|---|---|---|---|
| Estonian Reform Party | RE | 7,428 | 17 | 3,967 | 11,412 | 28.92% | 1 | 1 | 0 | 2 |
| Estonian Centre Party | K | 6,686 | 17 | 841 | 7,544 | 19.12% | 1 | 0 | 0 | 1 |
| Conservative People's Party of Estonia | EKRE | 5,516 | 10 | 1,662 | 7,188 | 18.22% | 1 | 0 | 0 | 1 |
| Pro Patria and Res Publica Union | IRL | 3,520 | 24 | 1,793 | 5,337 | 13.53% | 0 | 1 | 0 | 1 |
| Social Democratic Party | SDE | 3,166 | 13 | 1,462 | 4,641 | 11.76% | 0 | 1 | 0 | 1 |
| Estonian Free Party | EVA | 1,608 | 5 | 983 | 2,596 | 6.58% | 0 | 0 | 0 | 0 |
| Party of People's Unity | RÜE | 295 | 0 | 86 | 381 | 0.97% | 0 | 0 | 0 | 0 |
| Estonian Greens | EER | 145 | 3 | 103 | 251 | 0.64% | 0 | 0 | 0 | 0 |
| Estonian Independence Party | EIP | 73 | 0 | 15 | 88 | 0.22% | 0 | 0 | 0 | 0 |
| Estonian United Left Party | EÜVP | 20 | 0 | 1 | 21 | 0.05% | 0 | 0 | 0 | 0 |
| Valid votes | | 28,457 | 89 | 10,913 | 39,459 | 100.00% | 3 | 3 | 0 | 6 |
| Rejected votes | | 300 | 3 | 0 | 303 | 0.76% | | | | |
| Total polled | | 28,757 | 92 | 10,913 | 39,762 | 60.57% | | | | |
| Registered electors | | 65,554 | 92 | | 65,646 | | | | | |

The following candidates were elected:

- Personal mandates - Mart Helme (EKRE), 6,714 votes; Toomas Kivimägi (RE), 7,603 votes; and Kadri Simson (K), 5,726 votes.
- District mandates - Jüri Jaanson (RE), 1,328 votes; Andres Metsoja (IRL), 2,207 votes; and Indrek Saar (SDE), 1,944 votes.

==== 2011 ====
Results of the 2011 parliamentary election held on 6 March 2011:

| Party | | Votes | | | Total Votes | % | Seats | | | |
| Party | | Pärnu | Expat- riates | Elec- tronic | Total Votes | % | Per. | Dis. | Com. | Tot. |
|---|---|---|---|---|---|---|---|---|---|---|
| Estonian Reform Party | RE | 8,421 | 22 | 3,037 | 11,480 | 28.52% | 0 | 2 | 0 | 2 |
| Pro Patria and Res Publica Union | IRL | 6,399 | 63 | 2,336 | 8,798 | 21.86% | 0 | 1 | 1 | 2 |
| Estonian Centre Party | K | 6,316 | 7 | 699 | 7,022 | 17.44% | 0 | 1 | 0 | 1 |
| Social Democratic Party | SDE | 3,761 | 10 | 1,270 | 5,041 | 12.52% | 0 | 1 | 0 | 1 |
| Estonian Greens | EER | 3,367 | 11 | 966 | 4,344 | 10.79% | 0 | 0 | 0 | 0 |
| Mark Soosaar (Independent) | | 1,490 | 5 | 379 | 1,874 | 4.66% | 0 | 0 | 0 | 0 |
| People's Union of Estonia | ERL | 692 | 0 | 147 | 839 | 2.08% | 0 | 0 | 0 | 0 |
| Estonian Independence Party | EIP | 357 | 2 | 69 | 428 | 1.06% | 0 | 0 | 0 | 0 |
| Party of Estonian Christian Democrats | EKD | 130 | 0 | 52 | 182 | 0.45% | 0 | 0 | 0 | 0 |
| Russian Party in Estonia | VEE | 117 | 0 | 19 | 136 | 0.34% | 0 | 0 | 0 | 0 |
| Heiki Merirand (Independent) | | 98 | 2 | 11 | 111 | 0.28% | 0 | 0 | 0 | 0 |
| Valid votes | | 31,148 | 122 | 8,985 | 40,255 | 100.00% | 0 | 5 | 1 | 6 |
| Rejected votes | | 402 | 2 | 0 | 404 | 0.99% | | | | |
| Total polled | | 31,550 | 124 | 8,985 | 40,659 | 58.83% | | | | |
| Registered electors | | 68,986 | 124 | | 69,110 | | | | | |

The following candidates were elected:

- District mandates - Annely Akkermann (IRL), 3,257 votes; Rein Lang (RE), 3,922 votes; Väino Linde (RE), 2,632 votes; Marianne Mikko (SDE), 2,093 votes; and Kadri Simson (K), 3,854 votes.
- Compensatory mandates - Toomas Tõniste (IRL), 1,864 votes.

==== 2007 ====
Results of the 2007 parliamentary election held on 4 March 2007:

| Party | | Votes | | | Total Votes | % | Seats | | | |
| Party | | Pärnu | Expat- riates | Elec- tronic | Total Votes | % | Per. | Dis. | Com. | Tot. |
|---|---|---|---|---|---|---|---|---|---|---|
| Estonian Reform Party | RE | 10,432 | 13 | 558 | 11,003 | 27.78% | 0 | 2 | 0 | 2 |
| Estonian Centre Party | K | 8,677 | 9 | 137 | 8,823 | 22.28% | 0 | 2 | 0 | 2 |
| Pro Patria and Res Publica Union | IRL | 7,178 | 192 | 484 | 7,854 | 19.83% | 0 | 1 | 0 | 1 |
| Social Democratic Party | SDE | 4,059 | 15 | 211 | 4,285 | 10.82% | 0 | 1 | 0 | 1 |
| People's Union of Estonia | ERL | 3,179 | 2 | 90 | 3,271 | 8.26% | 0 | 0 | 0 | 0 |
| Estonian Greens | EER | 3,031 | 7 | 194 | 3,232 | 8.16% | 0 | 0 | 1 | 1 |
| Party of Estonian Christian Democrats | EKD | 525 | 1 | 18 | 544 | 1.37% | 0 | 0 | 0 | 0 |
| Estonian Independence Party | EIP | 229 | 1 | 13 | 243 | 0.61% | 0 | 0 | 0 | 0 |
| Constitution Party | K | 133 | 0 | 2 | 135 | 0.34% | 0 | 0 | 0 | 0 |
| Aare Kambla (Independent) | | 86 | 0 | 6 | 92 | 0.23% | 0 | 0 | 0 | 0 |
| Russian Party in Estonia | VEE | 76 | 0 | 2 | 78 | 0.20% | 0 | 0 | 0 | 0 |
| Estonian Left Party | EVP | 42 | 0 | 1 | 43 | 0.11% | 0 | 0 | 0 | 0 |
| Valid votes | | 37,647 | 240 | 1,716 | 39,603 | 100.00% | 0 | 6 | 1 | 7 |
| Rejected votes | | 363 | 5 | 0 | 368 | 0.92% | | | | |
| Total polled | | 38,010 | 245 | 1,716 | 39,971 | 57.67% | | | | |
| Registered electors | | 69,061 | 245 | | 69,306 | | | | | |

The following candidates were elected:

- District mandates - Kalle Laanet (K), 2,260 votes; Väino Linde (RE), 2,855 votes; Kadri Must (K), 2,008 votes; Mati Raidma (RE), 3,694 votes; Mark Soosaar (SDE), 1,374 votes; and Trivimi Velliste (IRL), 2,982 votes.
- Compensatory mandates - Mart Jüssi (EER), 1,265 votes.

==== 2003 ====
Results of the 2003 parliamentary election held on 2 March 2003:

| Party | | Votes | | Total Votes | % | Seats | | | |
| Party | | Pärnu | Expat- riates | Total Votes | % | Per. | Dis. | Com. | Tot. |
|---|---|---|---|---|---|---|---|---|---|
| Union for the Republic–Res Publica | ÜVE-RP | 10,354 | 34 | 10,388 | 28.81% | 1 | 1 | 0 | 2 |
| Estonian Centre Party | K | 8,236 | 7 | 8,243 | 22.86% | 0 | 2 | 0 | 2 |
| People's Union of Estonia | ERL | 5,606 | 5 | 5,611 | 15.56% | 0 | 1 | 0 | 1 |
| Estonian Reform Party | RE | 4,569 | 1 | 4,570 | 12.67% | 0 | 1 | 0 | 1 |
| Pro Patria Union Party | I | 3,061 | 77 | 3,138 | 8.70% | 0 | 0 | 1 | 1 |
| Moderate People's Party | RM | 2,347 | 10 | 2,357 | 6.54% | 0 | 0 | 0 | 0 |
| Estonian United People's Party | EÜRP | 491 | 0 | 491 | 1.36% | 0 | 0 | 0 | 0 |
| Estonian Independence Party | EIP | 484 | 1 | 485 | 1.34% | 0 | 0 | 0 | 0 |
| Estonian Christian People's Party | EKRP | 299 | 1 | 300 | 0.83% | 0 | 0 | 0 | 0 |
| Aino Värbu (Independent) | | 251 | 0 | 251 | 0.70% | 0 | 0 | 0 | 0 |
| Estonian Social Democratic Labour Party | ESDTP | 148 | 0 | 148 | 0.41% | 0 | 0 | 0 | 0 |
| Russian Party in Estonia | VEE | 77 | 1 | 78 | 0.22% | 0 | 0 | 0 | 0 |
| Valid votes | | 35,923 | 137 | 36,060 | 100.00% | 1 | 5 | 1 | 7 |
| Rejected votes | | 393 | 48 | 441 | 1.21% | | | | |
| Total polled | | 36,316 | 185 | 36,501 | 54.34% | | | | |
| Registered electors | | 66,990 | 185 | 67,175 | | | | | |
| Turnout | | 54.21% | 100.00% | 54.34% | | | | | |

The following candidates were elected:

- Personal mandates - Külvar Mand (ÜVE-RP), 5,873 votes.
- District mandates - Toomas Alatalu (K), 1,384 votes; Väino Linde (RE), 1,309 votes; Jaanus Männik (ERL), 2,115 votes; Mark Soosaar (K), 1,525 votes; and Ela Tomson (ÜVE-RP), 1,652 votes.
- Compensatory mandates - Trivimi Velliste (I), 1,424 votes.

==== 1999 ====
Results of the 1999 parliamentary election held on 7 March 1999:

| Party | | Votes | | Total Votes | % | Seats | | | |
| Party | | Pärnu | Expat- riates | Total Votes | % | Per. | Dis. | Com. | Tot. |
|---|---|---|---|---|---|---|---|---|---|
| Estonian Centre Party | K | 8,706 | 7 | 8,713 | 23.83% | 0 | 1 | 1 | 2 |
| Pro Patria Union | I | 4,561 | 199 | 4,760 | 13.02% | 0 | 1 | 1 | 2 |
| Estonian Reform Party | RE | 4,735 | 12 | 4,747 | 12.98% | 0 | 1 | 1 | 2 |
| Moderate | M | 3,892 | 23 | 3,915 | 10.71% | 0 | 0 | 0 | 0 |
| Estonian Country People's Party | EME | 3,626 | 7 | 3,633 | 9.94% | 0 | 0 | 2 | 2 |
| Estonian Coalition Party | KE | 3,598 | 5 | 3,603 | 9.86% | 0 | 0 | 0 | 0 |
| Elmar Lepp (Independent) | | 2,234 | 3 | 2,237 | 6.12% | 0 | 0 | 0 | 0 |
| Mark Soosaar (Independent) | | 1,659 | 2 | 1,661 | 4.54% | 0 | 0 | 0 | 0 |
| Estonian Blue Party | ESE | 712 | 1 | 713 | 1.95% | 0 | 0 | 0 | 0 |
| Estonian Christian People's Party | EKRP | 611 | 1 | 612 | 1.67% | 0 | 0 | 0 | 0 |
| Estonian United People's Party | EÜRP | 604 | 0 | 604 | 1.65% | 0 | 0 | 0 | 0 |
| Russian Party in Estonia | VEE | 485 | 0 | 485 | 1.33% | 0 | 0 | 0 | 0 |
| Progress Party | | 371 | 0 | 371 | 1.01% | 0 | 0 | 0 | 0 |
| Toomas Roosileht (Independent) | | 190 | 0 | 190 | 0.52% | 0 | 0 | 0 | 0 |
| Ülo Siinmaa (Independent) | | 190 | 0 | 190 | 0.52% | 0 | 0 | 0 | 0 |
| Farmers' Assembly | | 120 | 4 | 124 | 0.34% | 0 | 0 | 0 | 0 |
| Valid votes | | 36,294 | 264 | 36,558 | 100.00% | 0 | 3 | 5 | 8 |
| Rejected votes | | 629 | 4 | 633 | 1.70% | | | | |
| Total polled | | 36,923 | 268 | 37,191 | 55.54% | | | | |
| Registered electors | | 66,689 | 268 | 66,957 | | | | | |
| Turnout | | 55.37% | 100.00% | 55.54% | | | | | |

The following candidates were elected:

- District mandates - Väino Linde (RE), 1,877 votes; Koit Pikaro (K), 3,027 votes; and Trivimi Velliste (I), 3,803 votes.
- Compensatory mandates - Jaanus Männik (EME), 1,245 votes; Ants Ruusmann (K), 338 votes; Tiit Sinissaar (I), 408 votes; Andres Varik (EME), 1,144 votes; and Toomas Vilosius (RE), 1,605 votes.

==== 1995 ====
Results of the 1995 parliamentary election held on 5 March 1995:

| Party | | Votes | | Total Votes | % | Seats | | | |
| Party | | Pärnu | Expat- riates | Total Votes | % | Per. | Dis. | Com. | Tot. |
|---|---|---|---|---|---|---|---|---|---|
| Coalition Party and Rural People's Association | KMÜ | 18,647 | 23 | 18,670 | 42.01% | 0 | 3 | 3 | 6 |
| Estonian Reform Party | RE | 6,981 | 45 | 7,026 | 15.81% | 1 | 0 | 0 | 1 |
| Estonian Centre Party | K | 6,673 | 16 | 6,689 | 15.05% | 0 | 1 | 1 | 2 |
| Better Estonia/Estonian Citizen | PE/EK | 2,582 | 6 | 2,588 | 5.82% | 0 | 0 | 0 | 0 |
| Pro Patria and ERSP Union | I\ERSP | 2,073 | 354 | 2,427 | 5.46% | 0 | 0 | 1 | 1 |
| Moderate | M | 1,684 | 34 | 1,718 | 3.87% | 0 | 0 | 0 | 0 |
| The Right Wingers | P | 1,226 | 29 | 1,255 | 2.82% | 0 | 0 | 0 | 0 |
| Justice | Õ | 1,159 | 3 | 1,162 | 2.61% | 0 | 0 | 0 | 0 |
| Our Home is Estonia | MKOE | 657 | 3 | 660 | 1.49% | 0 | 0 | 0 | 0 |
| Estonian Future Party | TEE | 585 | 4 | 589 | 1.33% | 0 | 0 | 0 | 0 |
| Estonian National Federation | ERKL | 558 | 8 | 566 | 1.27% | 0 | 0 | 0 | 0 |
| Estonian Farmers' Party | ETRE | 365 | 3 | 368 | 0.83% | 0 | 0 | 0 | 0 |
| Fourth Force | NJ | 340 | 2 | 342 | 0.77% | 0 | 0 | 0 | 0 |
| Forest Party | | 315 | 0 | 315 | 0.71% | 0 | 0 | 0 | 0 |
| Blue Party | SE | 47 | 0 | 47 | 0.11% | 0 | 0 | 0 | 0 |
| Estonian Democratic Union | EDL | 15 | 1 | 16 | 0.04% | 0 | 0 | 0 | 0 |
| Valid votes | | 43,907 | 531 | 44,438 | 100.00% | 1 | 4 | 5 | 10 |
| Rejected votes | | 401 | 0 | 401 | 0.89% | | | | |
| Total polled | | 44,308 | 531 | 44,839 | 70.26% | | | | |
| Registered electors | | 63,285 | 531 | 63,816 | | | | | |
| Turnout | | 70.01% | 100.00% | 70.26% | | | | | |

The following candidates were elected:

- Personal mandates - Igor Gräzin (RE), 5,570 votes.
- District mandates - Priit Aimla (K), 2,077 votes; Toomas Alatalu (KMÜ), 4,949 votes; Jaanus Männik (KMÜ), 2,428 votes; and Andres Varik (KMÜ), 4,432 votes.
- Compensatory mandates - Ants Järvesaar (KMÜ), 593 votes; Arvo Junti (K), 1,930 votes; Rein Kask (KMÜ), 1,082 votes; Villu Müüripeal (KMÜ), 1,572 votes; Tiit Sinissaar (I\ERSP), 1,410 votes.

==== 1992 ====
Results of the 1992 parliamentary election held on 20 September 1992:

| Party | | Votes | | Total Votes | % | Seats | | | |
| Party | | Pärnu | Expat- riates | Total Votes | % | Per. | Dis. | Com. | Tot. |
|---|---|---|---|---|---|---|---|---|---|
| Pro Patria | I | 9,569 | 492 | 10,061 | 24.99% | 1 | 1 | 0 | 2 |
| Safe Home | KK | 7,449 | 26 | 7,475 | 18.57% | 1 | 0 | 0 | 1 |
| Popular Front of Estonia | R | 6,745 | 25 | 6,770 | 16.82% | 0 | 1 | 1 | 2 |
| Estonian National Independence Party | ERSP | 3,534 | 263 | 3,797 | 9.43% | 0 | 0 | 0 | 0 |
| Independent Kings | SK | 3,790 | 6 | 3,796 | 9.43% | 0 | 0 | 0 | 0 |
| Estonian Union of Pensioners | EPL | 1,715 | 2 | 1,717 | 4.27% | 0 | 0 | 0 | 0 |
| Estonian Citizen | EK | 1,445 | 0 | 1,445 | 3.59% | 0 | 0 | 0 | 0 |
| Moderate | M | 1,316 | 8 | 1,324 | 3.29% | 0 | 0 | 0 | 0 |
| Left Option | V | 1,054 | 1 | 1,055 | 2.62% | 0 | 0 | 0 | 0 |
| Jüri Reinson (Independent) | | 974 | 0 | 974 | 2.42% | 0 | 0 | 0 | 0 |
| Farmers' Assembly | | 938 | 15 | 953 | 2.37% | 0 | 0 | 0 | 0 |
| Estonian Entrepreneurs' Party | EEE | 512 | 4 | 516 | 1.28% | 0 | 0 | 0 | 0 |
| Greens | R | 360 | 10 | 370 | 0.92% | 0 | 0 | 0 | 0 |
| Valid votes | | 39,401 | 852 | 40,253 | 100.00% | 2 | 2 | 1 | 5 |
| Rejected votes | | 785 | 0 | 785 | 1.91% | | | | |
| Total polled | | 40,186 | 852 | 41,038 | 69.39% | | | | |
| Registered electors | | 58,277 | 865 | 59,142 | | | | | |
| Turnout | | 68.96% | 98.50% | 69.39% | | | | | |

The following candidates were elected:

- Personal mandates - Toomas Alatalu (KK), 4,868 votes; and Trivimi Velliste (I), 6,137 votes.
- District mandates - Sulev Alajõe (I), 1,670 votes; and Arvo Junti (R), 1,740 votes.
- Compensatory mandates - Rein Veidemann (R), 1,449 votes.
