= Aleksander Saharov =

Estonian footballer and beach soccer player

Personal information
- Full name: Aleksander Saharov
- Date of birth: 22 April 1982 (age 44)
- Place of birth: Türi, then part of Estonian SSR, Soviet Union
- Height: 1.71 m (5 ft 7 in)
- Position: Winger

Senior career*
Years	Team	Apps	(Gls)
1999–2005	FC Flora Tallinn	136	(30)
2002	→ FC Valga (loan)	9	(3)
2006–2007	JK Viljandi Tulevik	22	(8)
2008–2009	JK Nõmme Kalju	11	(0)

International career
2000–2005	Estonia	25	(1)
2009–	Estonia (beach soccer)		
- * Club domestic league appearances and goals

Aleksander Saharov (born 22 April 1982, in Türi) is a former Estonian professional footballer and current beach soccer player.

== Beach soccer ==
In 2009, after ending his professional football career, he started to play beach soccer in Unibet/Nõmme Kalju. He currently plays in Estonia national beach soccer team.

== International career ==
During his national team career he was capped 25 times and scored 1 goal. He made his debut on 26 April 2000 against Luxembourg in a Friendly match. He scored his only goal on 20 April 2005 against Norway in a Friendly match.

=== International goals ===
#	Date	Venue	Opponent	Score	Result	Competition
1	2005-04-20	A. Le Coq Arena, Tallinn	Norway	1–2	1–2	Friendly

== Personal life ==
He is 1.71 m tall and weighs 68 kg.
