= Olga Ivanova (politician) =

Estonian politician

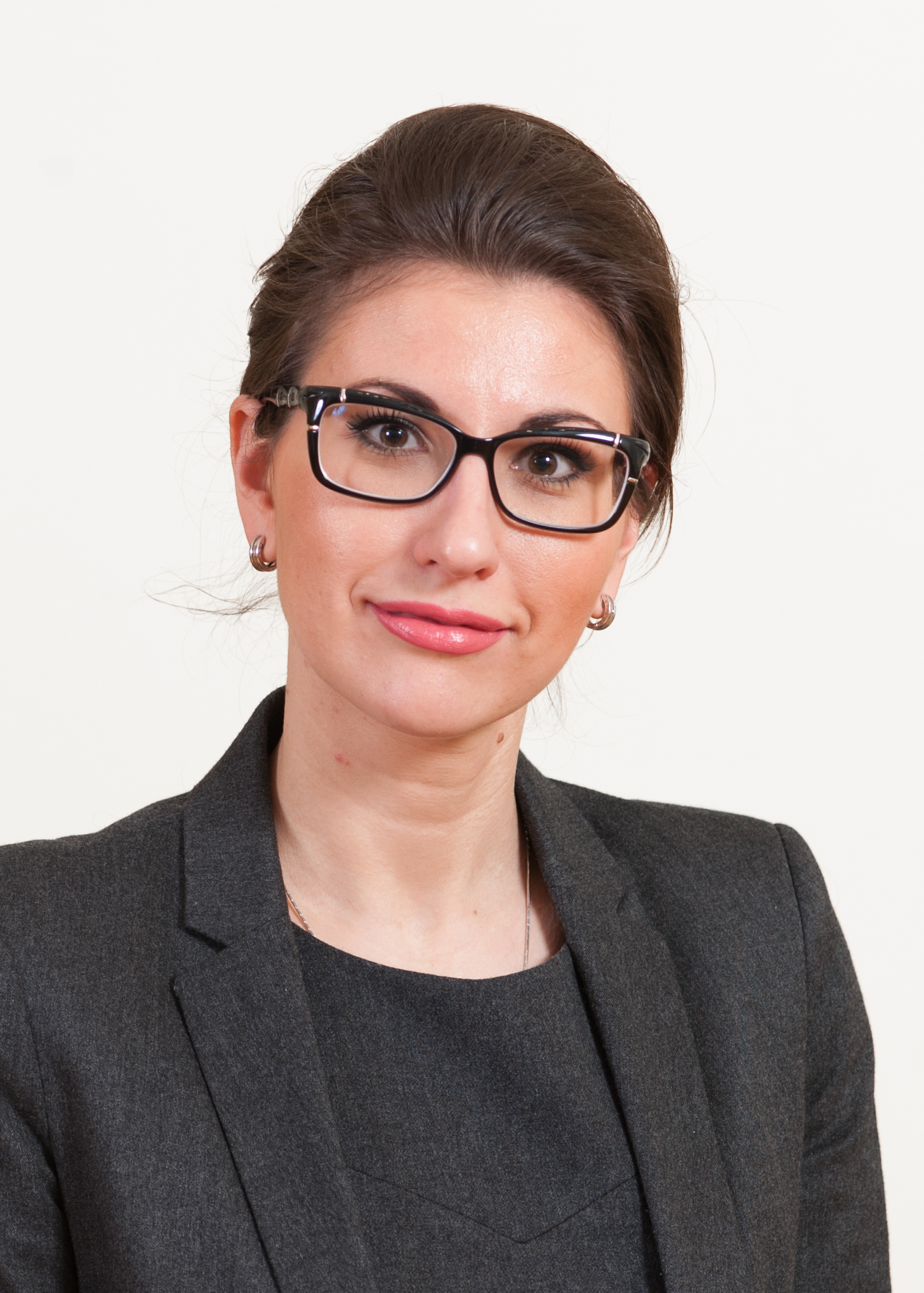
Ivanova in 2015.

Olga Ivanova (born 15 October 1984) is an Estonian politician, and a member of the Estonian Centre Party. She was chosen to the Estonian Parliament in the 2015 election with 1,948 personal votes. Ivanova has worked as Lasnamäe district elder since 2011.
