= Monika Haukanõmm =

Estonian politician (born 1972)

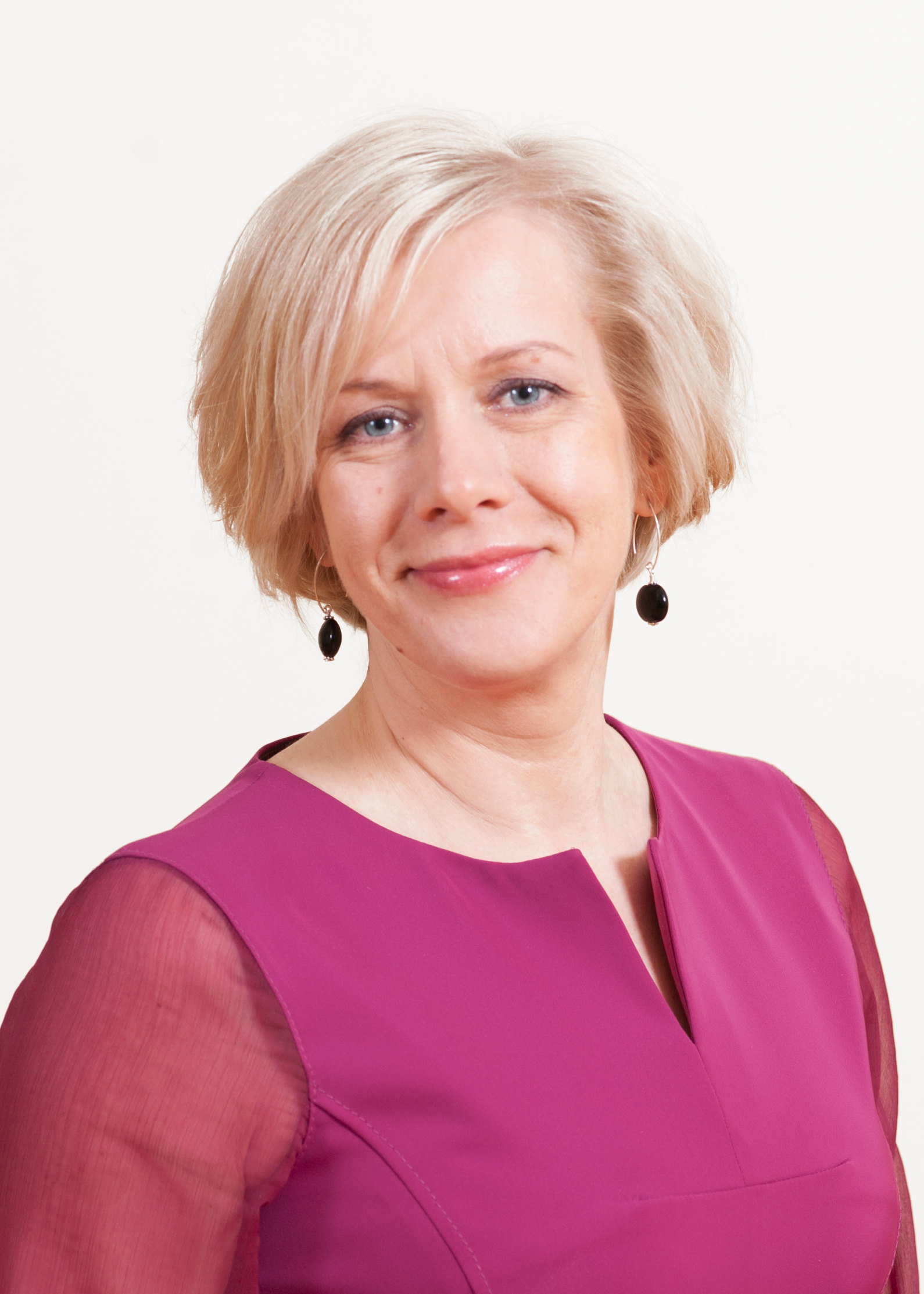
Monika Haukanõmm in 2015

Monika Haukanõmm (née Sarapuu; born 22 May 1972) is an Estonian social worker and politician who has been representing the Estonian Free Party in the Riigikogu since 2015.

== Education ==
Haukanõmm graduated from the University of Tartu with a Bachelor's Degree in Social Work in 1998, with her thesis, supervised by Riina Kiik, "Rehabilitation Situation of People with Mental Disorders in Tartu City". She studied at the University of Tartu's European College and Tallinn University's Master's program in social work.

== Career ==
Haukanõmm worked as the project manager of the Tartu Mental Health Care Center. From 2005 to 2010, she was an adviser to the Welfare Department of the Ministry of Social Affairs and head of the policy of elderly and disabled people. Since October 2010, she has been the chairwoman of the Board of the Estonian Disabled People's Council.

She is a member of the Board of the Estonian Health Insurance Fund, a member of the supervisory board of Haapsalu Neurological Rehabilitation Center, chairwoman of the Committee on the Affairs of the Senior Citizens of the Ministry of Social Affairs, and a member of the Estonian Psychosocial Rehabilitation Society.

In December 2014, Haukanõmm joined the Estonian Free Party. She was a candidate in the 2015 Riigikogu elections for Kesklinn, Lasnamäe and Pirita and was elected to the Riigikogu with 450 votes.

She acts as a mentor in the Parity Satisfaction Promotion Program. She has published articles in the magazine Sinuga.
