= Türi =

Town in Estonia

- Town
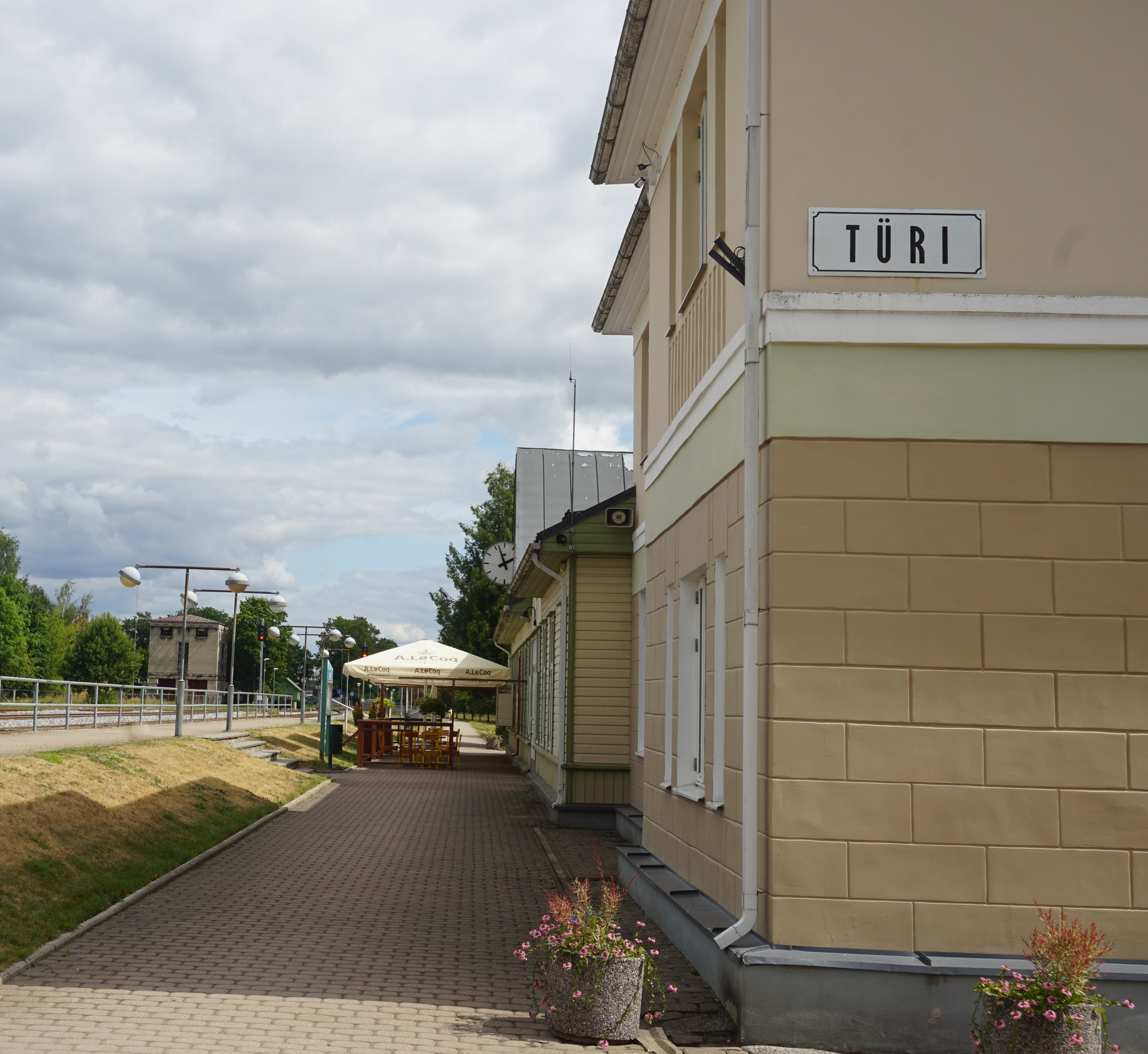

- Location within Estonia
- Coordinates: 58°48′34″N 25°25′45″E
- Country: Estonia
- County: Järva County
- Municipality: Türi Parish
- Town status: 1926

Area
  - Total: 9.79 km^{2} (3.78 sq mi)

Population (2026)
  - Total: 5,022
  - Rank: 22nd
  - Density: 513/km^{2} (1,330/sq mi)
- Time zone: UTC+2 (EET)
  - Summer (DST): UTC+3 (EEST)

Türi is a town in Järva County, Estonia. It is the administrative centre of Türi Parish. Due to its spring flower fairs, which have been held since 1977 and are known throughout Estonia, Türi has also been known as the "spring capital" of Estonia since 2000.

It has a railway station on the Tallinn - Viljandi railway line operated by Elron (rail transit).

== History ==
- ca 1250 The Catholic (now Lutheran) St. Martin's Church was established in Türi
- 1347 Türi first mentioned in written records (German: Turgel)
- 1687 The establishment of the first school
- 1900 Railway traffic (Viljandi–Tallinn, Türi–Paide) opened
- 1917 Türi gains the rights of a market town
- 1924 The first secondary education institution in Türi opened – Türi Horticultural Gymnasium
- 1926 The rights of a town given to Türi
- 1937 Erection of a 197 m-tall (646 ft) radio mast.
- 1941 The radio mast was blown up by Soviet Union forces
- 1950 - 1959 Türi - the centre of Türi County.
- 1995 Türi Museum opened.
- 1997 Türi College of the University of Tartu for environmental science studies opened
- 2000 Türi declared the Spring Capital of Estonia by Mart Laar, the prime minister of Estonia
- 2005 Türi became the administrative centre of newly formed Türi Parish.

=== Türi Church ===
Türi Church, originally dedicated to St. Martin, is a well-preserved medieval hall church of a form typical for central Estonia. Construction of the church probably started in the late 13th century and the ceiling was completed in the early 14th century. It retains much of its medieval look, including carved stone details such as consoles in the form of human heads. Other noteworthy interior details include the renaissance pulpit, a Baroque retable (by Christian Ackermann) and an altar painting by August Georg Wilhelm Pezold from 1856.

== Gallery ==
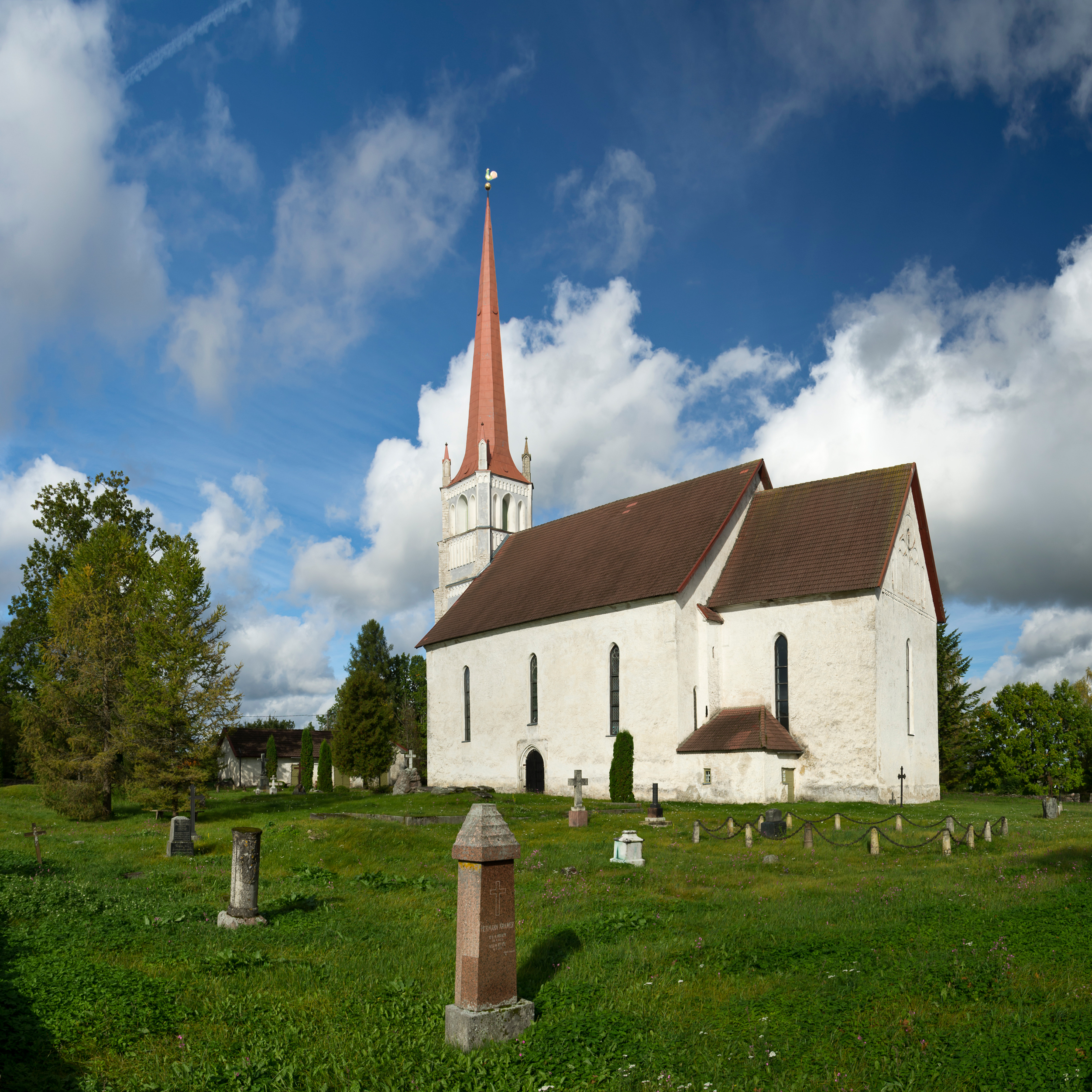
St. Martin Church of Türi (southern side)

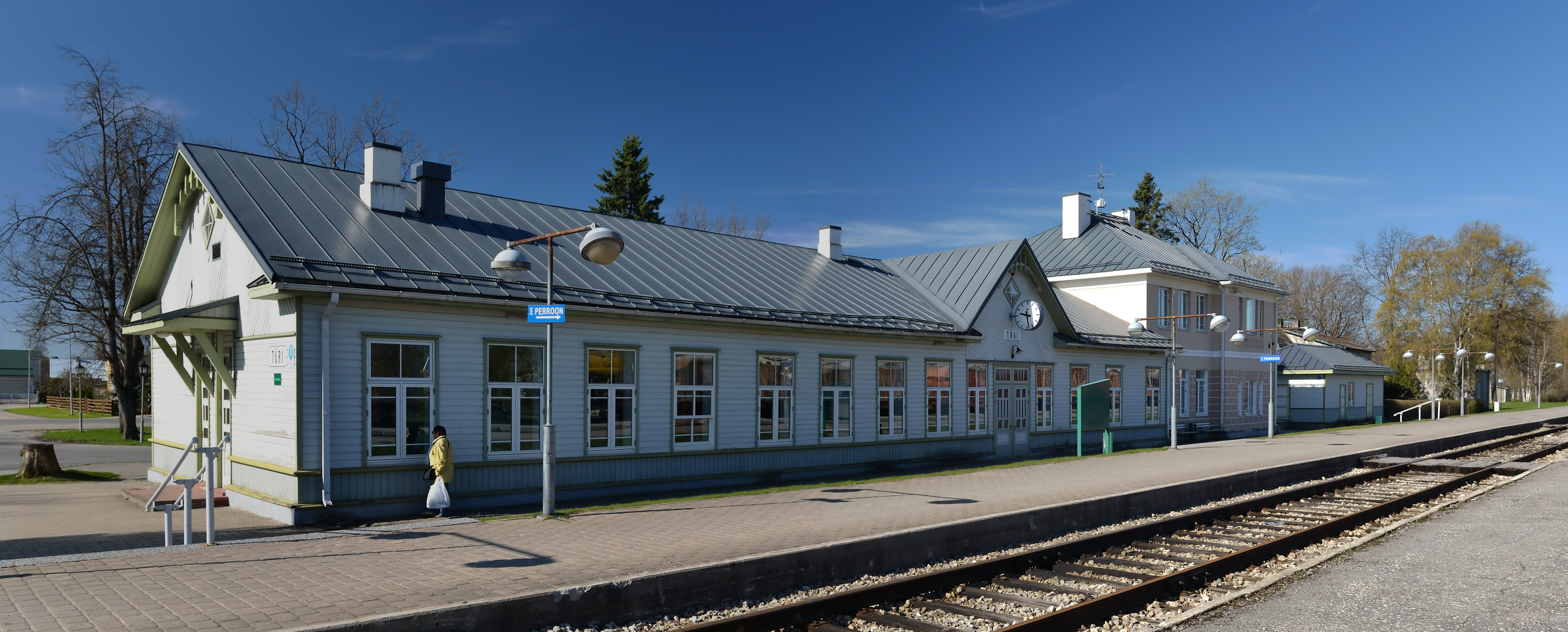
Türi railway station

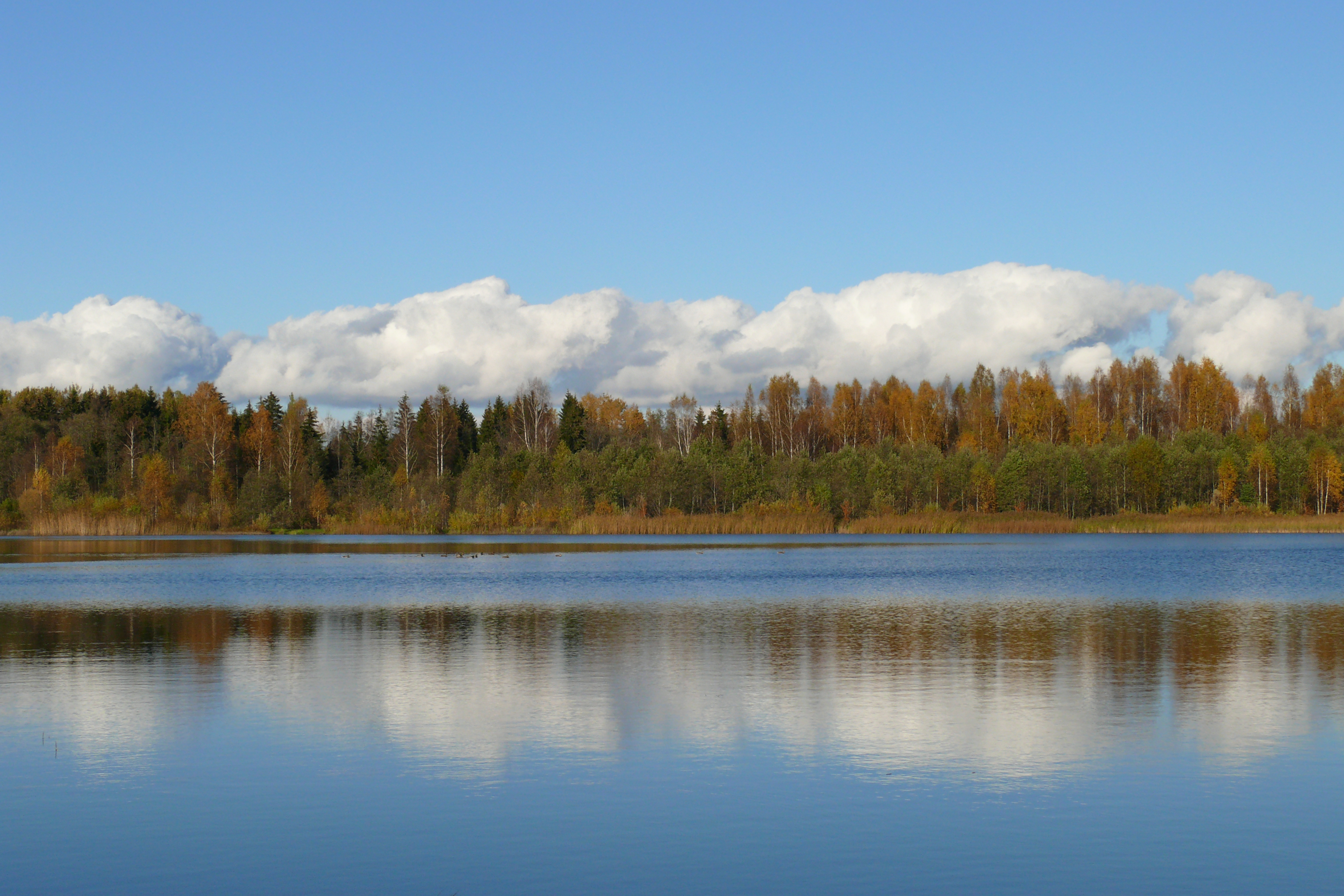
Türi reservoir

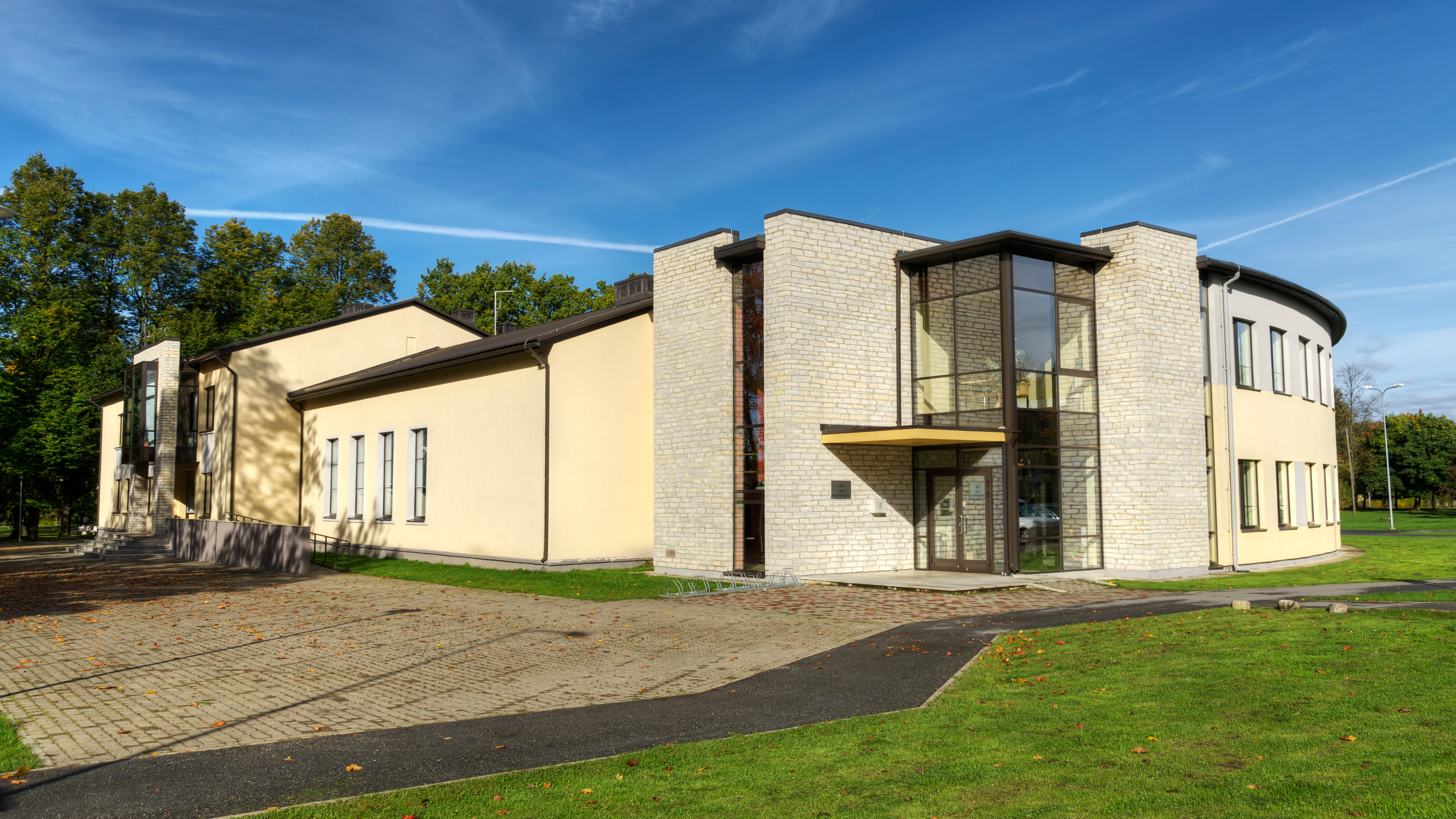
Türi cultural center

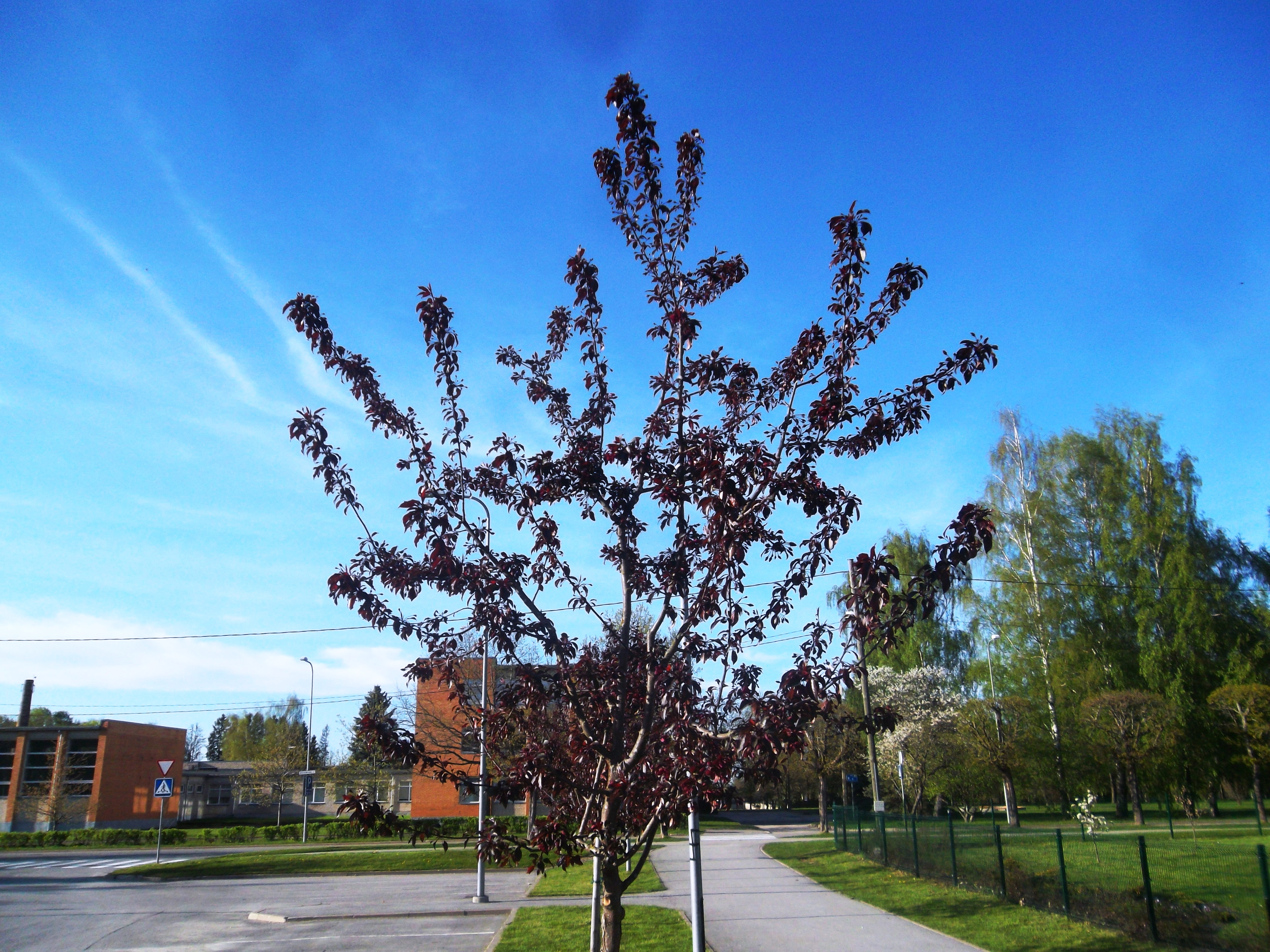
View of Türi (2014)

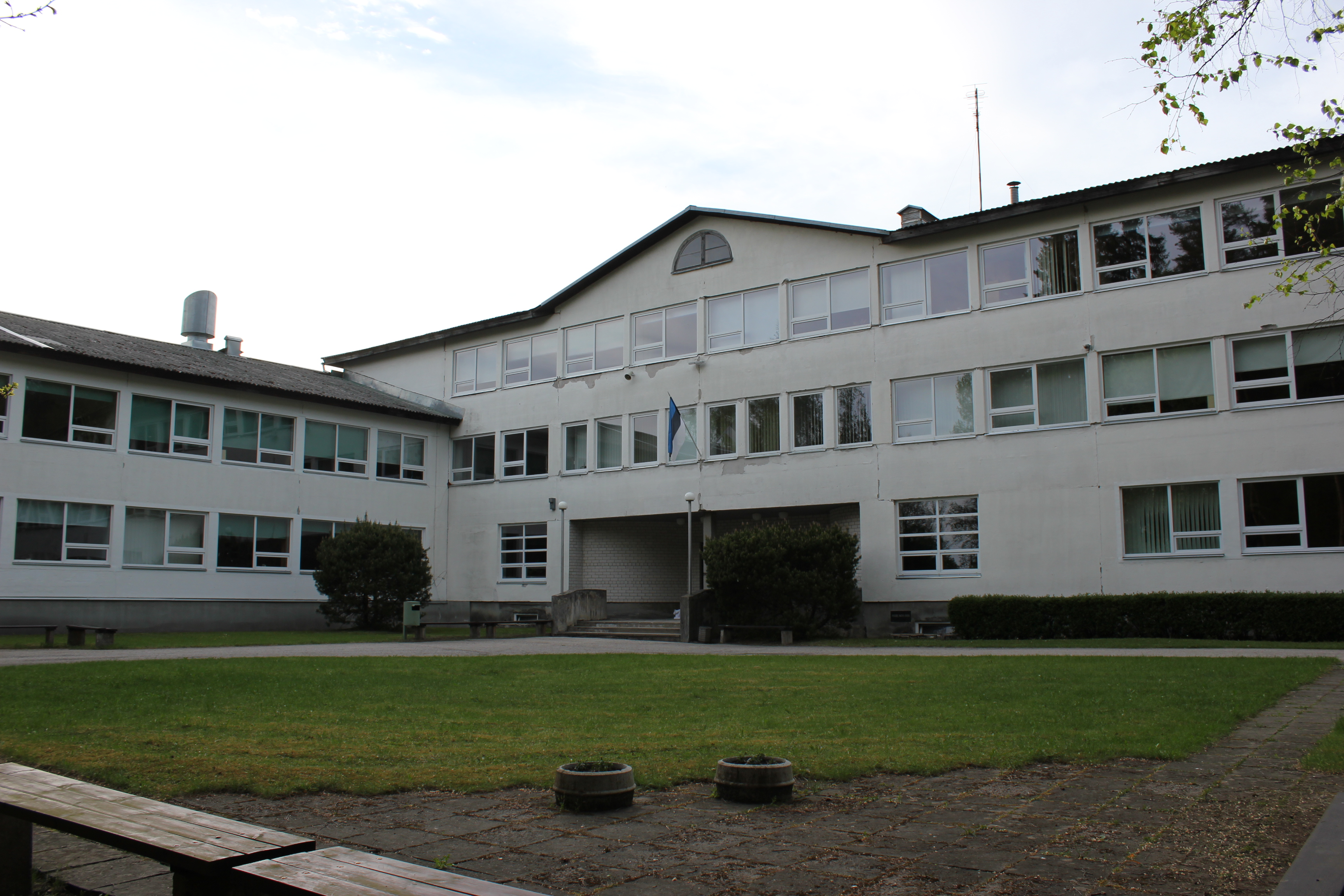
Türi school

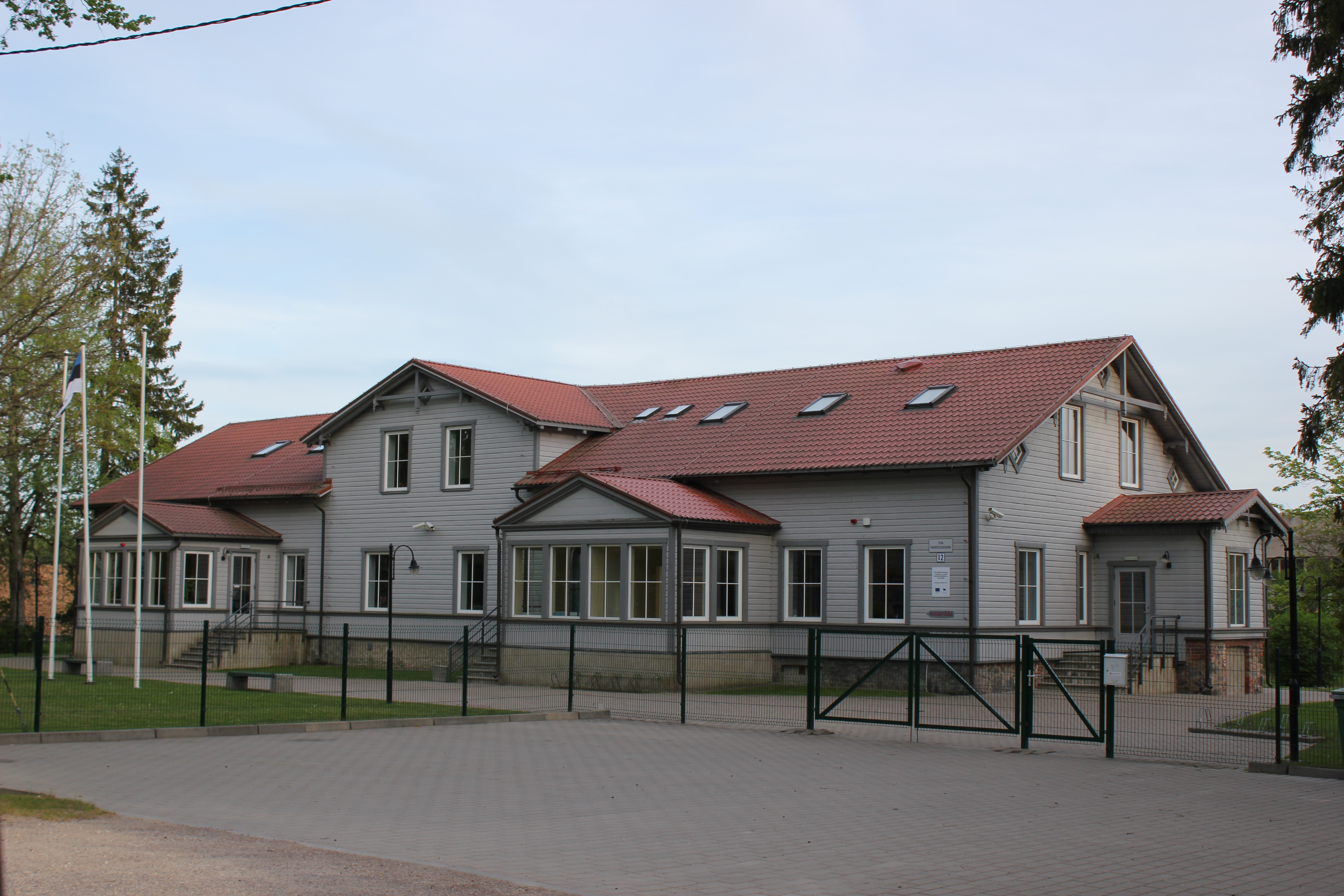
Türi Kevade School for the disabled

== Notable people ==
- Arvo Junti (born 1953), lawyer and politician.
- Kaia Iva (1964–2023), Mayor of Türi, 2002 to 2005, member of Riigikogu, 2007 to 2015 and Minister of Social Protection from 2016.
- Kristiina Poska (born 1978), conductor and principal guest conductor of the Latvian National Symphony Orchestra in 2021.
- Aleksander Saharov (born 1982), former footballer who played about 170 games and is now a beach soccer player.
- Kristian Marmor (born 1987), footballer who played over 170 games and also beach soccer player, having played 57 games for Estonia national beach soccer team.

== Demographics ==
Ethnic composition 1922-2021
Ethnicity	1922		1934		1941		1959		1970		1979		1989		2000		2011		2021	
Ethnicity	amount	%	amount	%	amount	%	amount	%	amount	%	amount	%	amount	%	amount	%	amount	%	amount	%
Estonians	2011	95.8	2826	97.3	2819	98.9	4958	88.1	5482	87.4	5989	90.4	6236	90.9	5885	93.1	5125	94.7	4839	94.3
Russians	10	0.48	21	0.72	6	0.21	-	-	385	6.14	397	5.99	316	4.61	229	3.62	137	2.53	122	2.38
Ukrainians	-	-	0	0.00	-	-	-	-	90	1.43	66	1.00	136	1.98	87	1.38	68	1.26	69	1.35
Belarusians	-	-	-	-	-	-	-	-	18	0.29	14	0.21	11	0.16	6	0.09	4	0.07	5	0.10
Finns	-	-	3	0.10	0	0.00	-	-	69	1.10	68	1.03	73	1.06	57	0.90	31	0.57	30	0.58
Jews	0	0.00	2	0.07	0	0.00	-	-	5	0.08	8	0.12	2	0.03	0	0.00	0	0.00	0	0.00
Latvians	-	-	3	0.10	2	0.07	-	-	7	0.11	8	0.12	4	0.06	5	0.08	5	0.09	12	0.23
Germans	38	1.81	24	0.83	-	-	-	-	-	-	56	0.85	47	0.68	17	0.27	9	0.17	8	0.16
Tatars	-	-	0	0.00	-	-	-	-	-	-	2	0.03	2	0.03	0	0.00	0	0.00	0	0.00
Poles	-	-	4	0.14	7	0.25	-	-	-	-	0	0.00	3	0.04	1	0.02	1	0.02	0	0.00
Lithuanians	-	-	0	0.00	3	0.11	-	-	19	0.30	13	0.20	11	0.16	5	0.08	4	0.07	4	0.08
unknown	4	0.19	15	0.52	2	0.07	0	0.00	0	0.00	0	0.00	0	0.00	7	0.11	2	0.04	13	0.25
other	36	1.72	5	0.17	12	0.42	667	11.9	200	3.19	5	0.08	21	0.31	25	0.40	24	0.44	27	0.53
Total	2099	100	2903	100	2851	100	5625	100	6275	100	6626	100	6862	100	6324	100	5410	100	5129	100

== Climate ==
Climate data for Türi (normals 1991–2020, extremes 1925–present)
Month	Jan	Feb	Mar	Apr	May	Jun	Jul	Aug	Sep	Oct	Nov	Dec	Year
Record high °C (°F)	8.8 (47.8)	11.3 (52.3)	18.7 (65.7)	27.0 (80.6)	30.7 (87.3)	33.1 (91.6)	34.3 (93.7)	34.3 (93.7)	28.5 (83.3)	21.0 (69.8)	13.1 (55.6)	11.1 (52.0)	34.3 (93.7)
Mean daily maximum °C (°F)	−1.6 (29.1)	−1.5 (29.3)	3.1 (37.6)	10.7 (51.3)	17.0 (62.6)	20.6 (69.1)	23.3 (73.9)	21.7 (71.1)	16.3 (61.3)	9.1 (48.4)	3.3 (37.9)	0.2 (32.4)	10.2 (50.4)
Daily mean °C (°F)	−3.9 (25.0)	−4.5 (23.9)	−0.9 (30.4)	5.2 (41.4)	11.0 (51.8)	15.1 (59.2)	17.8 (64.0)	16.2 (61.2)	11.4 (52.5)	5.7 (42.3)	1.2 (34.2)	−1.9 (28.6)	6.0 (42.8)
Mean daily minimum °C (°F)	−6.5 (20.3)	−7.4 (18.7)	−4.5 (23.9)	0.4 (32.7)	4.9 (40.8)	9.4 (48.9)	12.3 (54.1)	11.2 (52.2)	7.2 (45.0)	2.6 (36.7)	−1 (30)	−4.1 (24.6)	2.0 (35.6)
Record low °C (°F)	−34.5 (−30.1)	−36.2 (−33.2)	−30.7 (−23.3)	−20.8 (−5.4)	−6.8 (19.8)	−2.6 (27.3)	1.2 (34.2)	−1.7 (28.9)	−6.1 (21.0)	−12.5 (9.5)	−23.1 (−9.6)	−37.6 (−35.7)	−37.6 (−35.7)
Average precipitation mm (inches)	57 (2.2)	44 (1.7)	38 (1.5)	38 (1.5)	45 (1.8)	79 (3.1)	69 (2.7)	91 (3.6)	62 (2.4)	74 (2.9)	67 (2.6)	62 (2.4)	726 (28.6)
Average precipitation days (≥ 1.0 mm)	12.4	10.2	9.4	8.0	7.6	10.3	9.5	10.9	9.8	12.6	12.1	13.6	126.4
Average relative humidity (%)	90	87	79	71	67	72	75	80	85	89	91	91	81
Source: Estonian Weather Service (precipitation days 1971–2000)

== See also ==
- JK Ganvix Türi
