= Raivo Põldaru =

Estonian politician (born 1951)

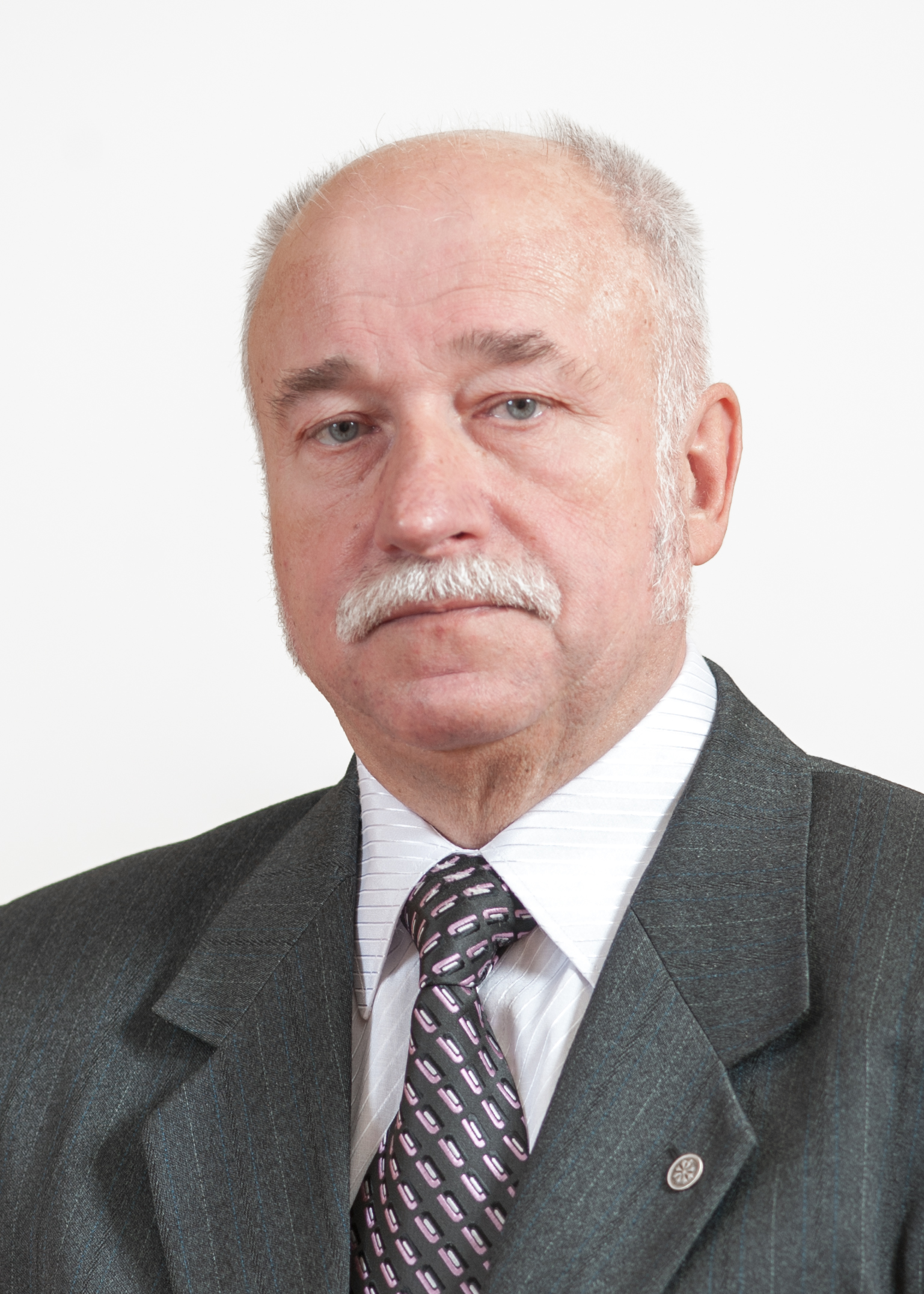
Raivo Põldaru

Raivo Põldaru (born 29 May 1951 in Põltsamaa, Jõgeva County) is an Estonian politician. He was a member of the XIII Riigikogu.

In 1974, he graduated from University of Tartu with a degree in mathematics.

From 1999 to 2010 he was the director of Saduküla Basic School. From 2004 to 2006 he was the director of Puurmani Gymnasium.

Since 2010 he has been a member of the Estonian Conservative People's Party.
