= Tiit Sinissaar =

Estonian politician

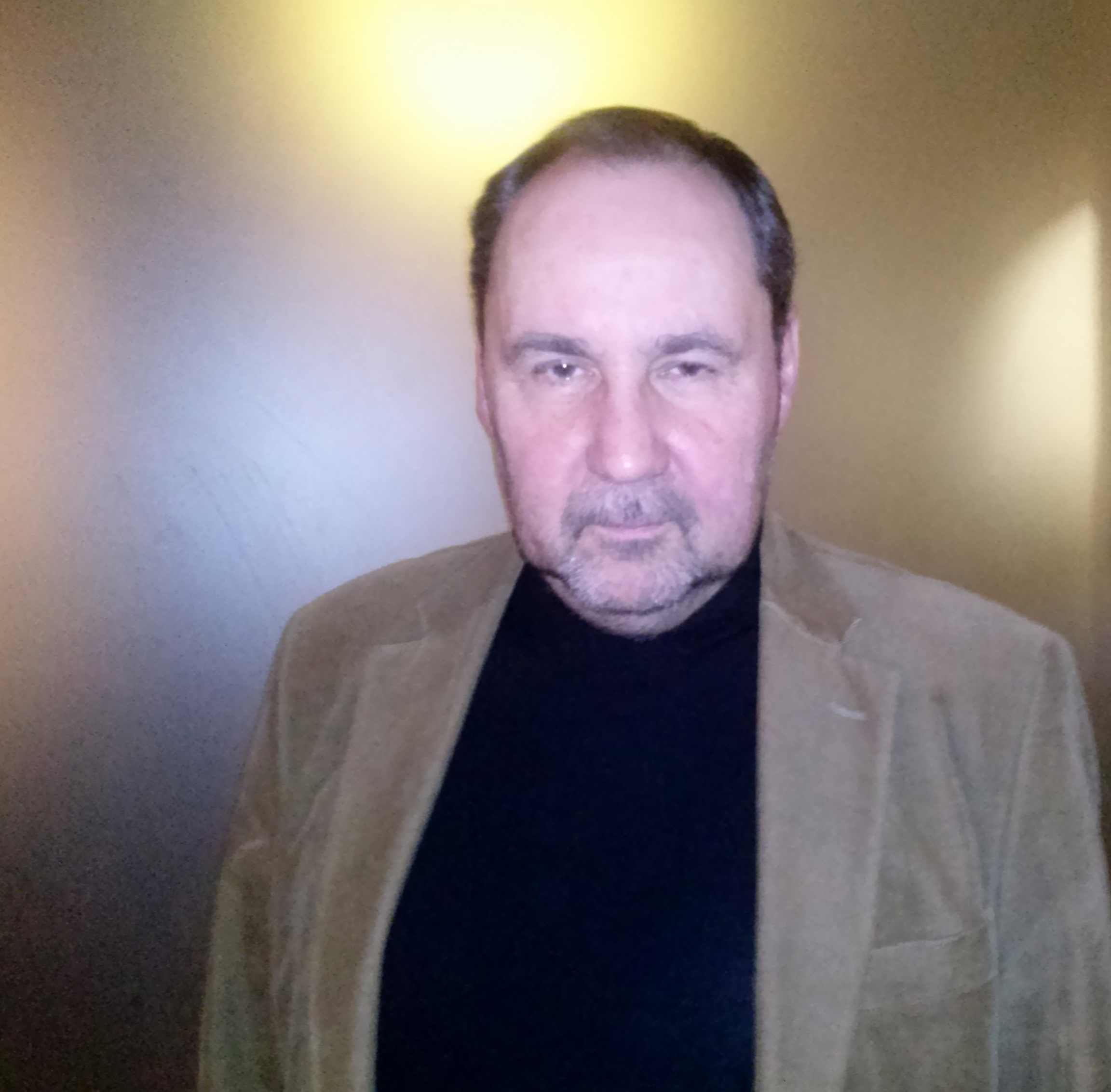
Tiit Sinissaar

Tiit Sinissaar (born 7 September 1947 in Tartu) is an Estonian politician. He was a member of the VII, VIII and IX Riigikogu.
