= Toomas Alatalu =

Estonian politician

Toomas Alatalu (born 23 August 1942 in Rakvere) is an Estonian historian, educator, political commentator and politician. He has been a member of VII, VIII and X Riigikogu.

== Education ==
Alatalu graduated from Pärnu Secondary School No. 4 in 1960 and from the Faculty of History and Linguistics of Tartu State University in 1965, majoring in history.

In 1977, he defended his PhD in philosophy at Leningrad State University with the dissertation Революционная ситуация и особенности ее созревания в Латинской Америке (The Revolutionary Situation and Peculiarities of Its Maturation in Latin America).

== Political career ==
From 1999 until 2005 he belonged to the Estonian Centre Party. From 2005 until 2009, he was a member of the People's Union of Estonia party. Between 2009 and 2018, he was a member of the Social Democratic Party.
