= Jaanus Männik =

Estonian politician (born 1951)

Jaanus Männik (born 3 May 1951 in Põltsamaa) is an Estonian politician. He has been member of VIII, IX and X Riigikogu.

He was a member of People's Union of Estonia. In September 2007, he became the mayor of Are Parish. On 7 March 2011 he became mayor of Surju Parish.
