= Väino Linde =

Estonian lawyer and politician

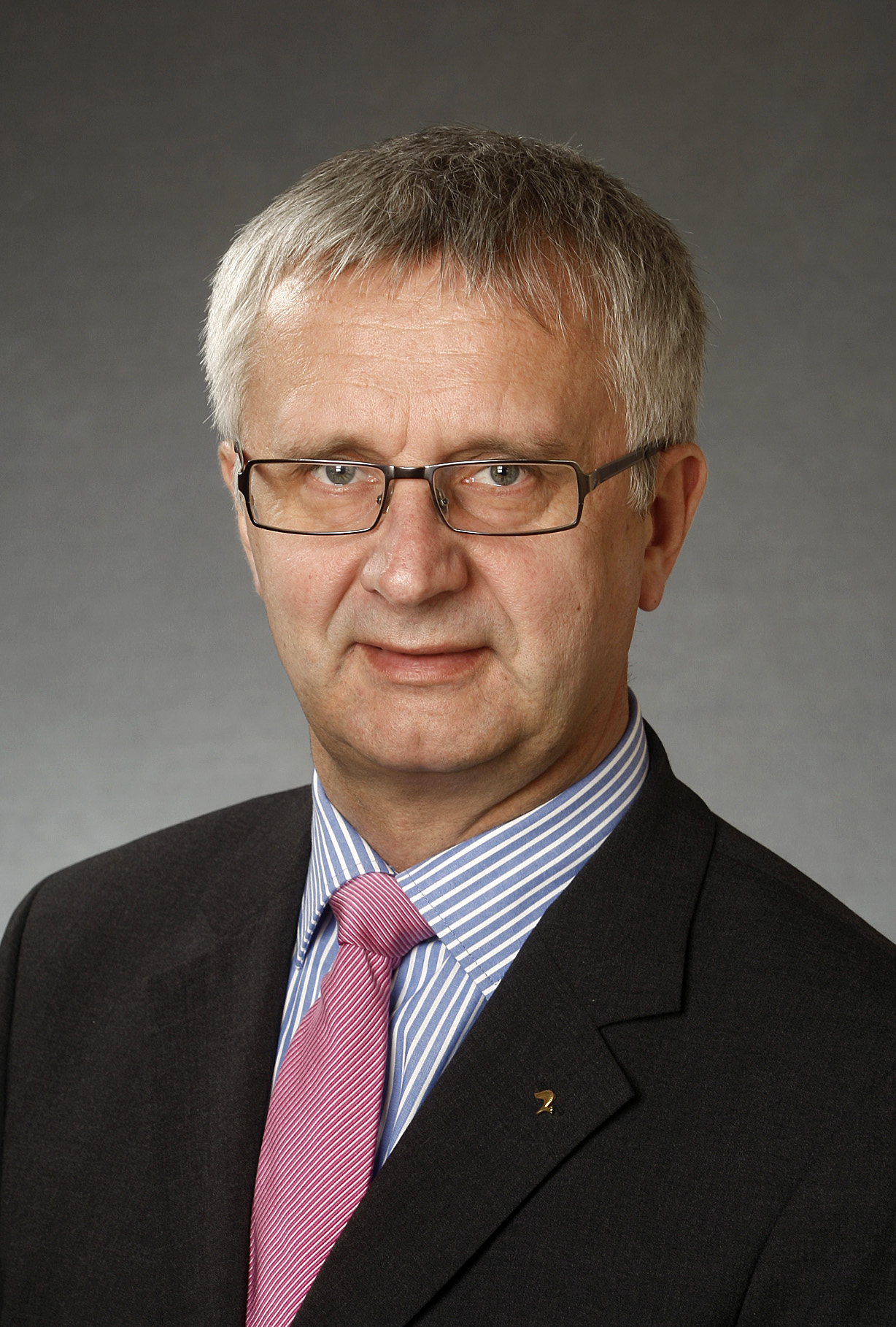
Väino Linde in 2011

Väino Linde (born 31 January 1959 in Tallinn) is an Estonian lawyer and politician. From 1995 until 1996, he was Mayor of Pärnu. He has been member of the IX and X, XI and XII Riigikogu.

He is a member of Estonian Reform Party.
