= Toomas Kivimägi =

Estonian politician and lawyer

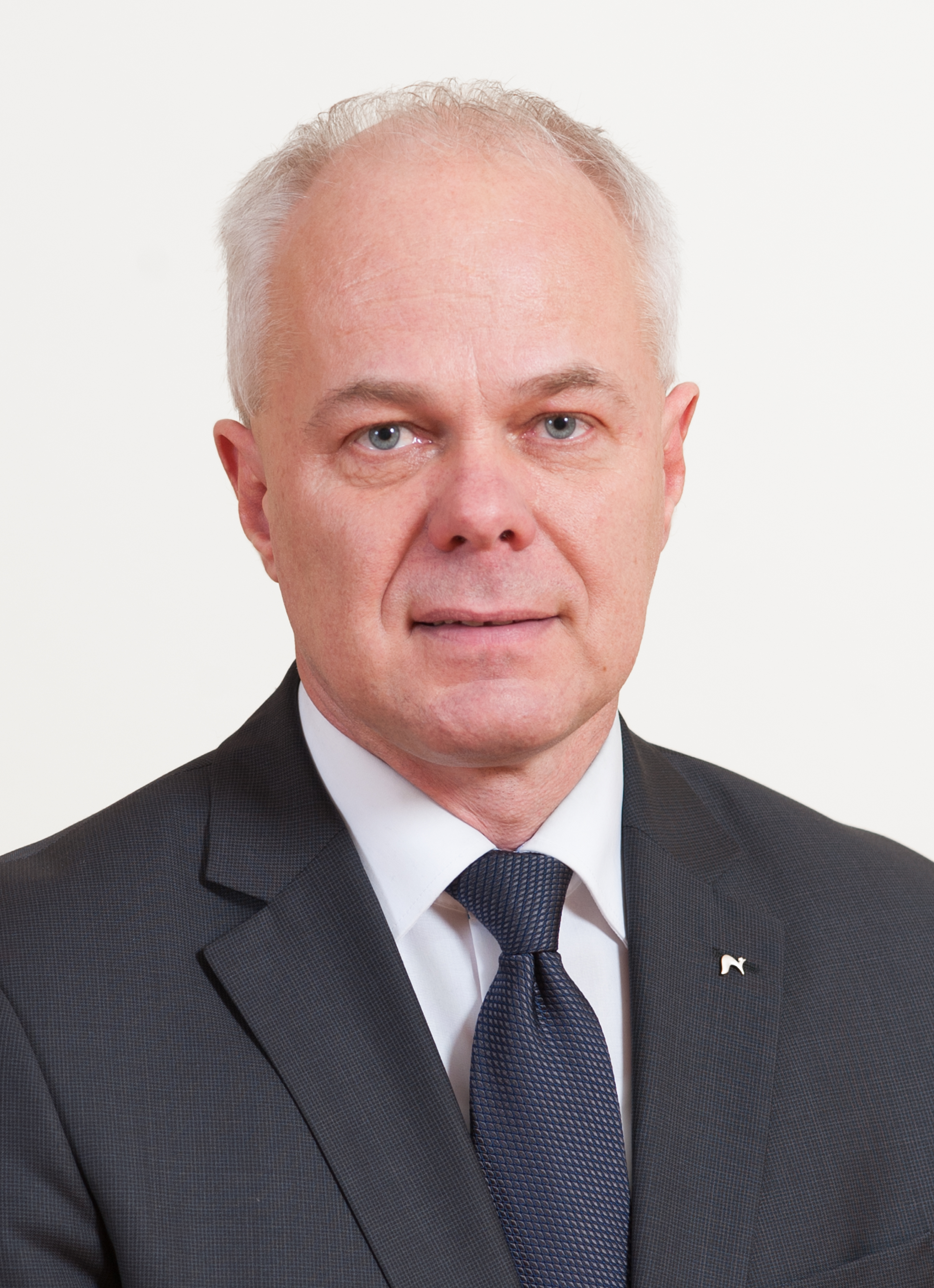
Kivimägi in 2015

Toomas Kivimägi (born 16 February 1963 in Lihula, Lääne County) is an Estonian politician and lawyer. He has been a member of the XIII and XIV Riigikogu.

In 1986 he graduated from the University of Tartu, studying law. In 1990, he became the lawyer of the Pärnu County Agriculture Department. From 1992 until 1993, he was the Vice County Governor of Pärnu. From 7 December 1993 until 18 November 2009, Kivimägi was the County Governor of Pärnu, and from 19 November 2009 until 30 March 2015, he was the Mayor of Pärnu. On 1 March 2015, he was elected a member of the Riigikogu.

Since 2014 he has been a member of the Estonian Reform Party.
