= 2015 Estonian parliamentary election =

- 1 March 2015

101 seats in the Riigikogu 51 seats needed for a majority
- Turnout: 64.23% (▲0.70pp)
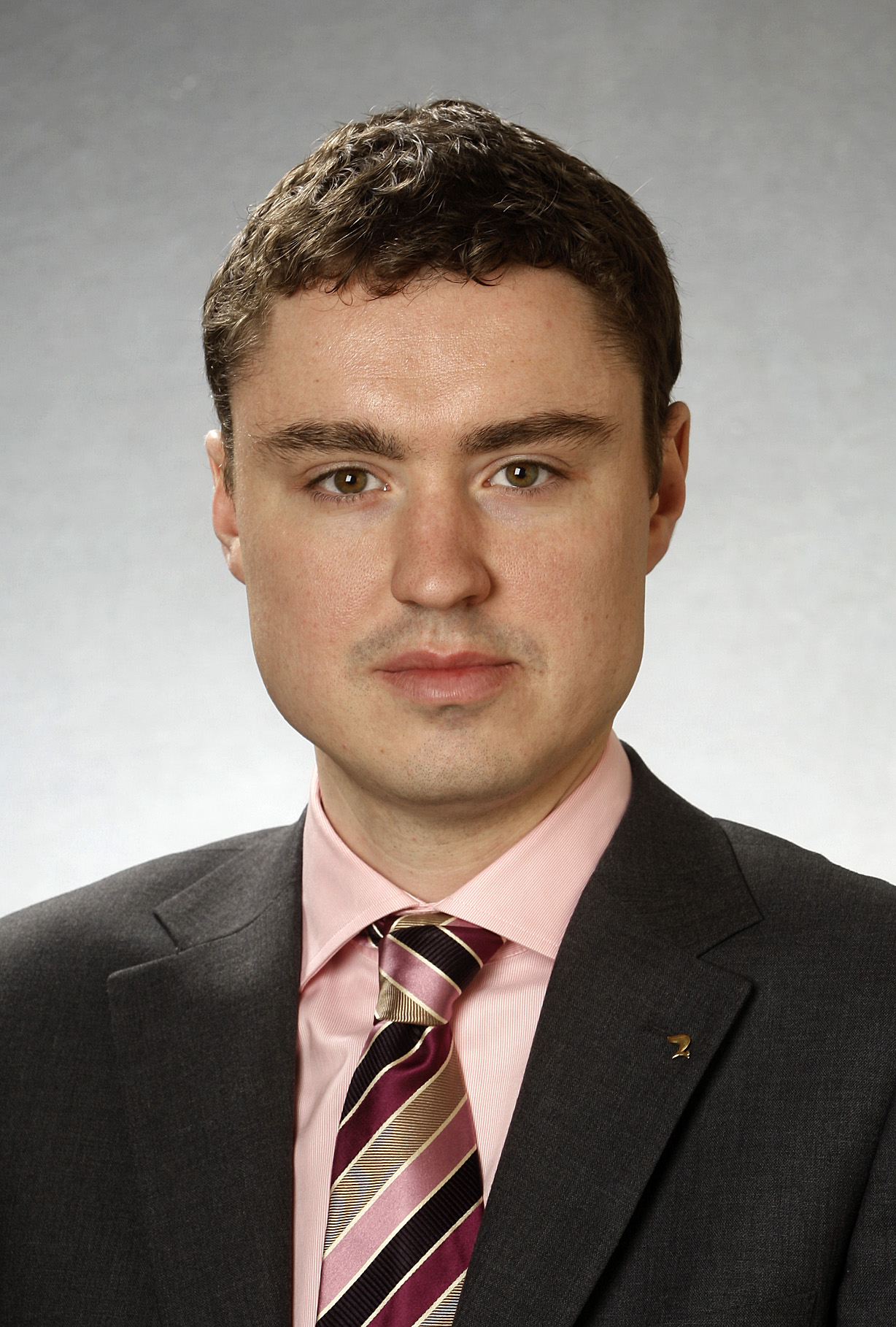

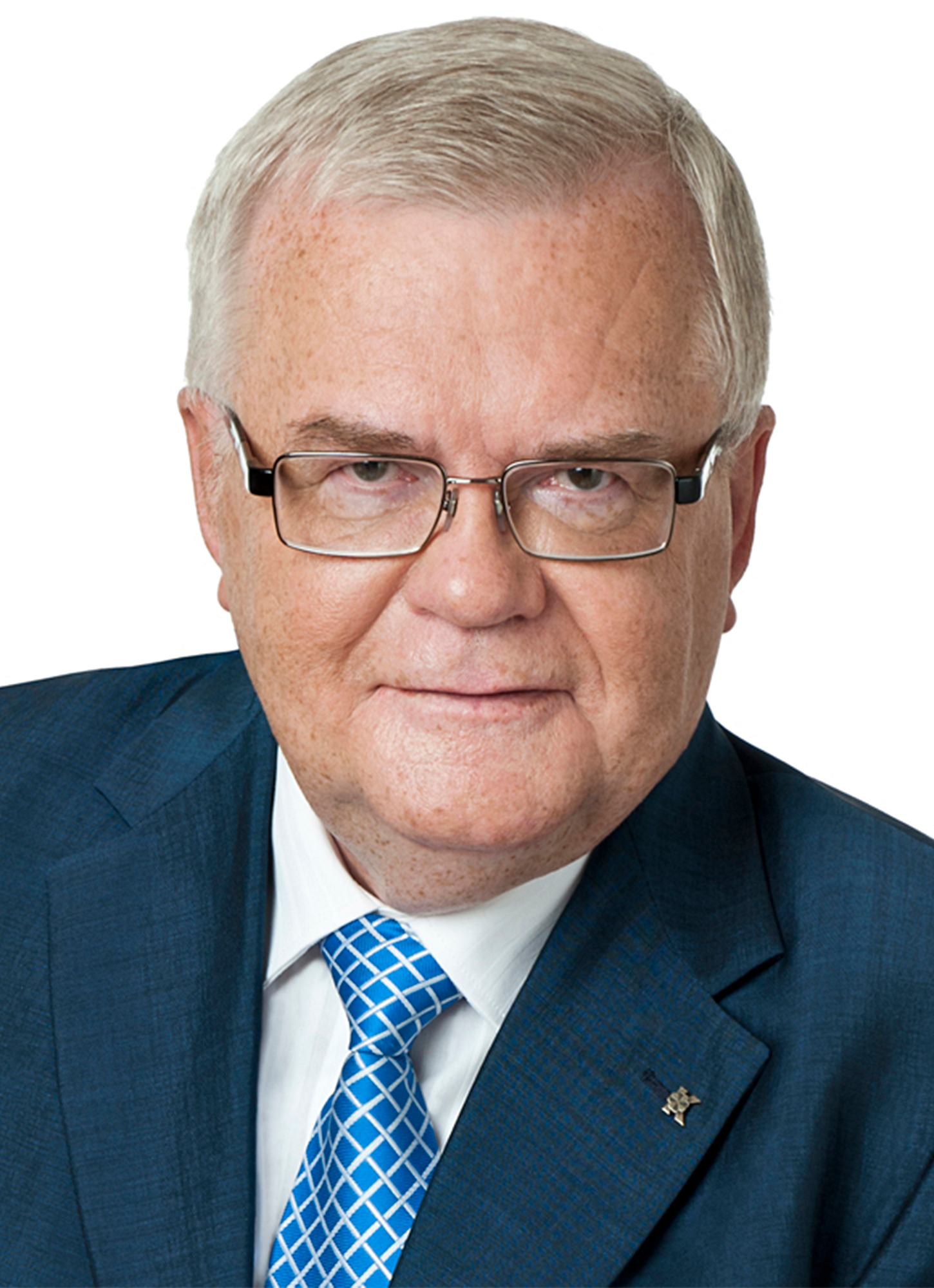

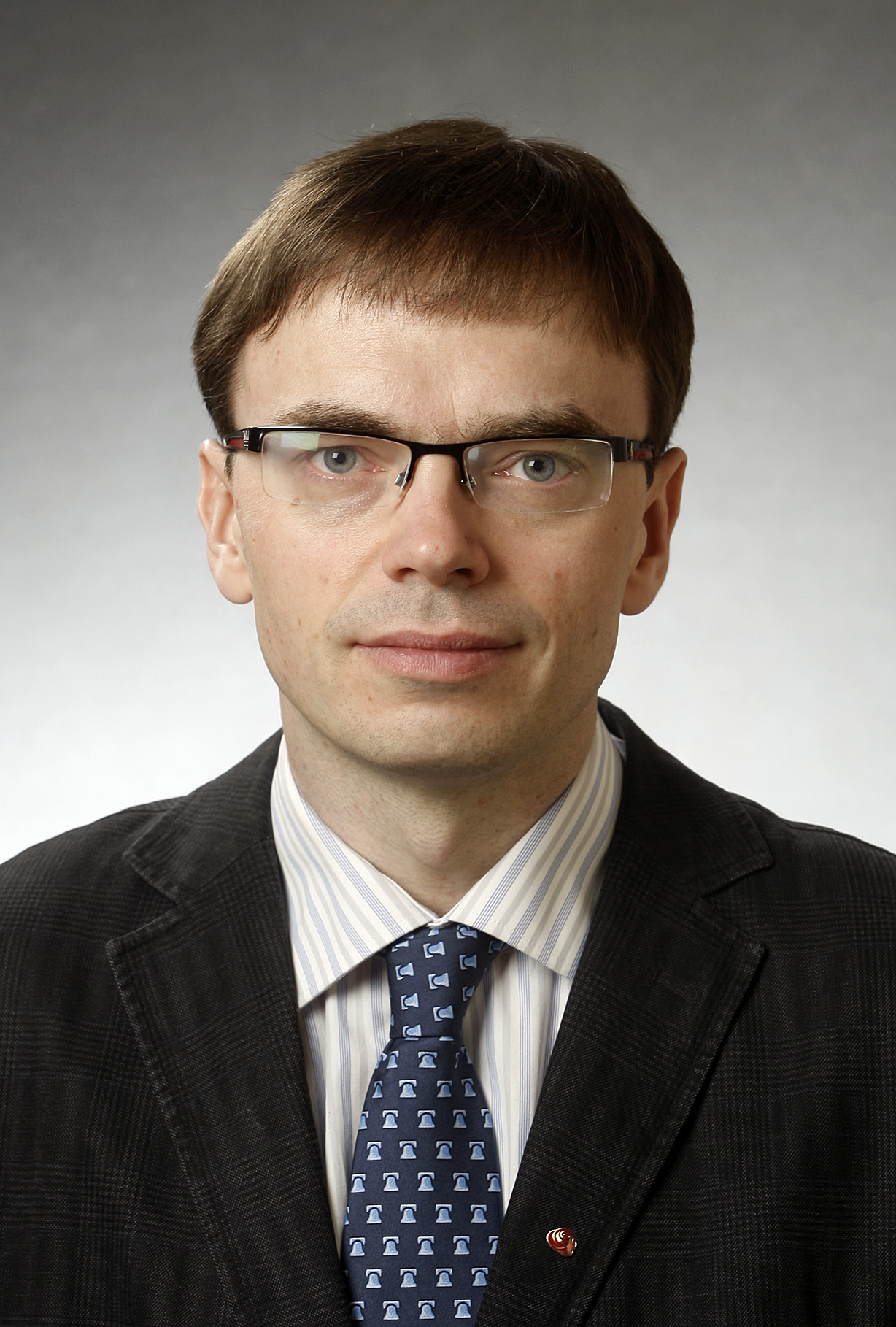

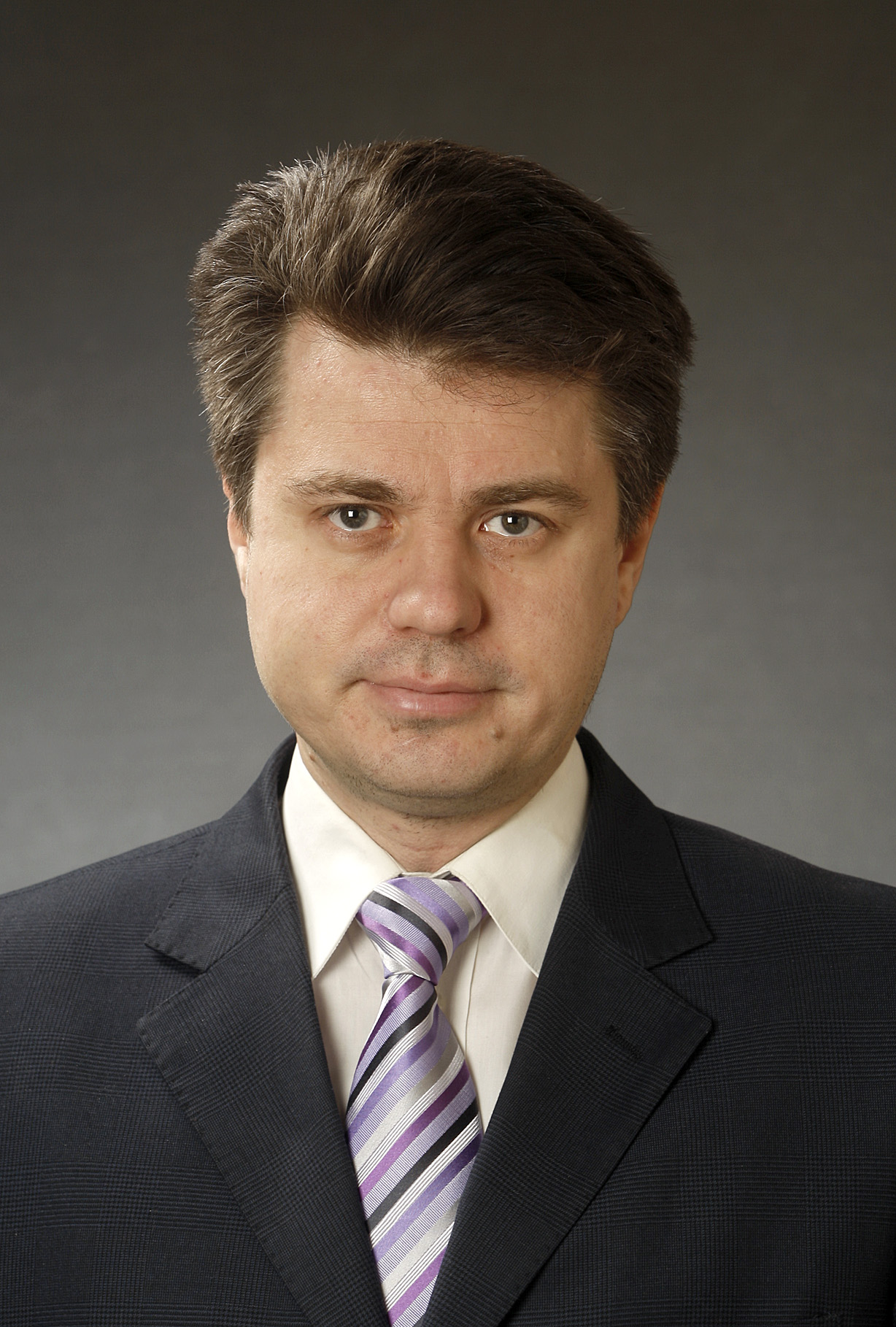

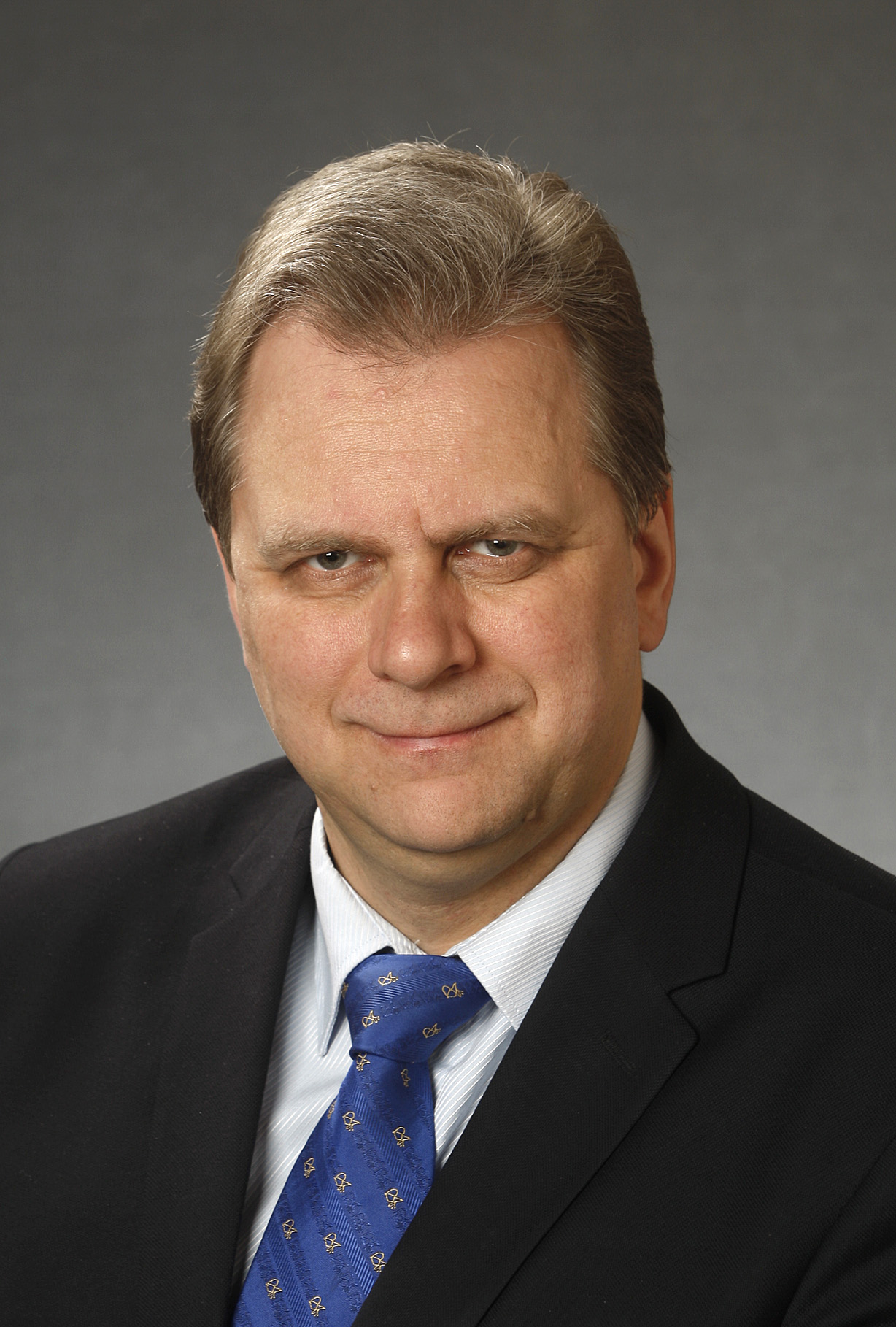

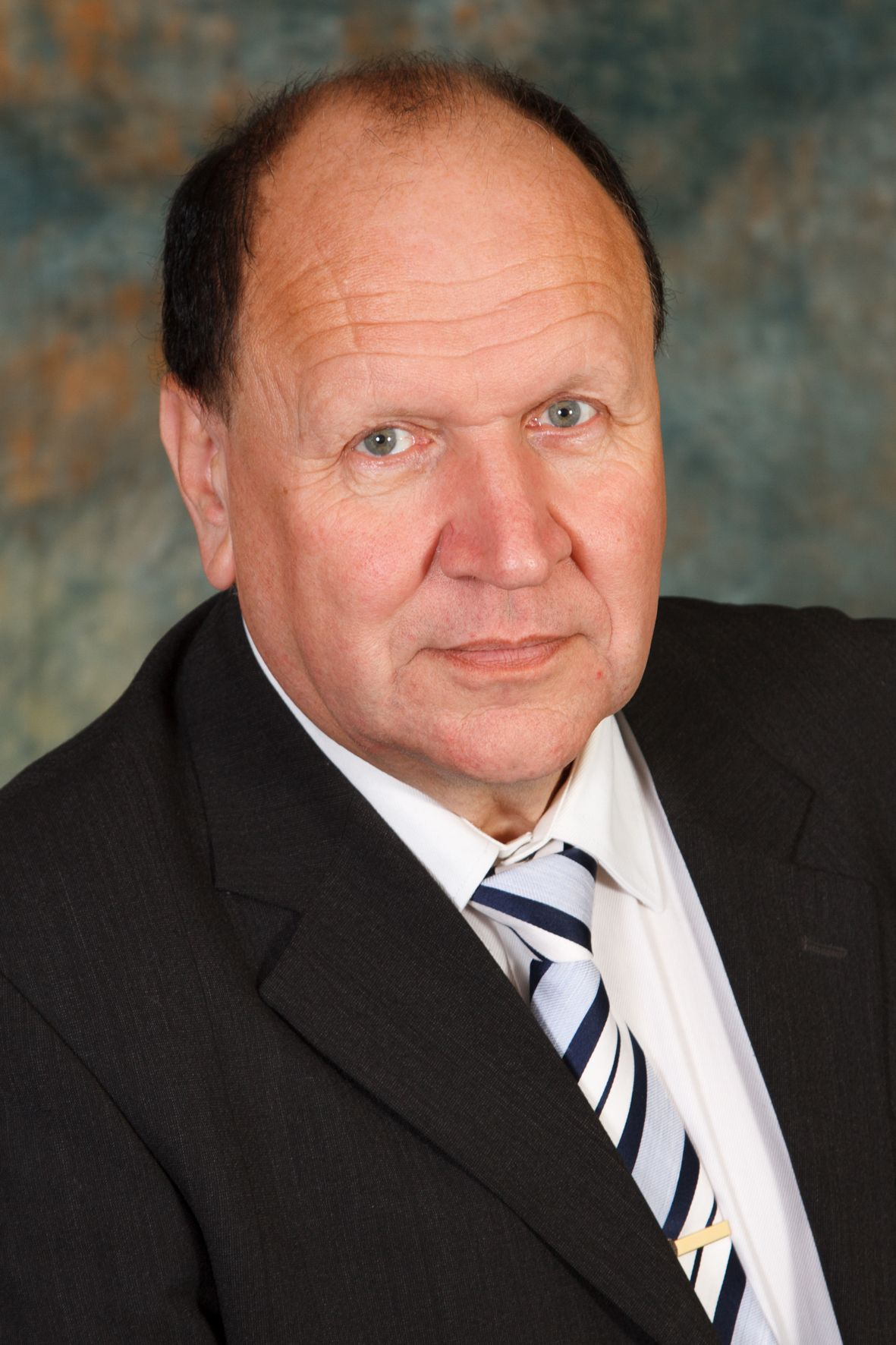
| | First party | Second party | Third party |
|---|---|---|---|
| Leader | Taavi Rõivas | Edgar Savisaar | Sven Mikser |
| Party | Reform | Centre | SDE |
| Last election | 28.56%, 33 seats | 23.32%, 26 seats | 17.09%, 19 seats |
| Seats won | 30 | 27 | 15 |
| Seat change | ▼3 | ▲1 | ▼4 |
| Popular vote | 158,970 | 142,458 | 87,189 |
| Percentage | 27.69% | 24.81% | 15.19% |
| Swing | ▼0.87pp | ▲1.49pp | ▼1.90pp |
| | Fourth party | Fifth party | Sixth party |
| Leader | Urmas Reinsalu | Andres Herkel | Mart Helme |
| Party | IRL | Free | EKRE |
| Last election | 20.52%, 23 seats | – | 2.12%, 0 seats |
| Seats won | 14 | 8 | 7 |
| Seat change | ▼9 | New | ▲7 |
| Popular vote | 78,699 | 49,882 | 46,772 |
| Percentage | 13.71% | 8.69% | 8.15% |
| Swing | ▼6.81pp | New | ▲6.03pp |
- Results by electoral district
Prime Minister before election
Taavi Rõivas
Reform
Prime Minister after election
Taavi Rõivas
Reform

Parliamentary elections were held in Estonia on 1 March 2015. Advance voting was held between 19 and 25 February with a turnout of 33 percent. The Reform Party remained the largest in the Riigikogu, winning 30 of the 101 seats. Its leader, Taavi Rõivas, remained Prime Minister. The newly elected 101 members of the 13th Riigikogu assembled at Toompea Castle in Tallinn within ten days of the election. Two political newcomers, the Free Party and the Conservative People's Party (EKRE) crossed the threshold to enter the Riigikogu.

In January 2015, the National Electoral Committee announced that ten political parties and eleven individual candidates had registered to take part in the 2015 parliamentary election. Individuals from contesting political parties also participated in multiple organised debates in January and February 2015.

Following this election, Reform successfully negotiated with the Triple Alliance parties SDE and IRL afterwards, forming a second government headed by Rõivas in April. This coalition fell after a vote of confidence in the following year, bringing about the first government to not feature Reform since 1999 due to the collapse of the cordon sanitaire around the Centre Party after it elected a new leader, ending the long-lasting leadership of Edgar Savisaar, who had been perceived as too Russophilic.

== Background ==
This was the first election since the resignation of Prime Minister Andrus Ansip, who relinquished his position after holding the office for almost nine years, a record-length tenure for an Estonian head of government. Following the resignation, a new coalition comprising the Estonian Reform Party and the Estonian Social Democrats were authorized to form a new government on 24 March 2014 with 34-year-old Taavi Rõivas as the new Prime Minister. This replaced the prior coalition of the Estonian Reform Party and the Pro Patria and Res Publica Union.

== Electoral system ==
The 101 members of the Riigikogu were elected by proportional representation in twelve multi-member constituencies. The seats were allocated using a modified D'Hondt method. Parties had to pass a nationwide threshold of 5%, but if the number of votes cast for an individual candidate exceeded or equalled the simple quota (obtained by dividing the number of valid votes cast in the electoral district by the number of mandates in the district), they were elected.

=== Seats by electoral district ===
| # | Electoral district | Seats |
|---|---|---|
| 1 | Haabersti, Põhja-Tallinn and Kristiine districts in Tallinn | 9 |
| 2 | Kesklinn, Lasnamäe and Pirita districts in Tallinn | 12 |
| 3 | Mustamäe and Nõmme districts in Tallinn | 8 |
| 4 | Harju (without Tallinn) and Rapla counties | 14 |
| 5 | Hiiu, Lääne and Saare counties | 6 |
| 6 | Lääne-Viru county | 5 |
| 7 | Ida-Viru county | 7 |
| 8 | Järva and Viljandi counties | 7 |
| 9 | Jõgeva and Tartu counties (without city of Tartu) | 8 |
| 10 | City of Tartu | 8 |
| 11 | Võru, Valga and Põlva counties | 9 |
| 12 | Pärnu county | 8 |

== Contesting parties ==
The Estonian National Electoral Committee announced that ten political parties and 11 individual candidates registered to take part in the 2015 parliamentary election. Their registration numbers and order were determined by a draw lot.

| # | Name | Ideology | Political position | Leader | Total candidates | 2011 result | |
| # | Name | Ideology | Political position | Leader | Total candidates | Votes (%) | Seats |
|---|---|---|---|---|---|---|---|
| 1 | People's Unity | Civic nationalism | Right-wing to far-right | Kristiina Ojuland | 35 | did not exist | |
| 2 | Conservative People's Party | Right-wing populism | Right-wing to far-right | Mart Helme | 125 | 2.1% | 0 / 101 |
| 3 | Reform Party | Classical liberalism | Centre-right | Taavi Rõivas | 124 | 28.6% | 33 / 101 |
| 4 | IRL | Christian democracy | Centre-right | Urmas Reinsalu | 125 | 20.5% | 23 / 101 |
| 5 | Greens | Green politics | Centre-left | Aleksander Laane | 40 | 3.8% | 0 / 101 |
| 6 | United Left Party | Russian minority politics | Left-wing | Valev Kald | 25 | 2.1% (Note: Members of the party ran on the list of the People's Union of Estonia.) | 0 / 101 |
| 7 | Free Party | Conservatism | Centre-right | Andres Herkel | 125 | did not exist | |
| 8 | Centre Party | Plurinationalism | Centre-left | Edgar Savisaar | 125 | 23.3% | 26 / 101 |
| 9 | Social Democratic Party | Social democracy | Centre-left | Sven Mikser | 125 | 17.1% | 19 / 101 |
| 10 | Independence Party | Estonian nationalism | Far-right | Vello Leito | 12 | 0.5% | 0 / 101 |
| — | Individual candidates | — | | | 11 | did not exist | |

== Opinion polls ==
Poll results are listed in the table below in reverse chronological order, showing the most recent first. The highest percentage figure in each poll is displayed in bold, and the background shaded in the leading party's color. In the instance that there is a tie, then no figure is shaded.

Local regression chart of 2011-2015 poll results

| Date | Polling firm | Ref | Kesk | IRL | SDE | Green | EKRE | EVA | Others | Lead |
|---|---|---|---|---|---|---|---|---|---|---|
| **1 Mar 2015** | **Election results** | **27.7** | **24.8** | **13.7** | **15.2** | **0.9** | **8.1** | **8.7** | **0.9** | **2.9** |
| 23–26 Feb 2015 | TNS Emor | **26** | 22 | 16 | 19 | - | 6 | 10 | 1 | **4** |
| Feb 2015 | Turu-uuringute AS | 22 | **27** | 16 | 18 | - | 6 | 6 | 5 | **5** |
| 11–18 Feb 2015 | TNS Emor | **23** | 22 | 14 | 20 | 2 | 9 | 9 | 1 | **1** |
| Jan 2015 | Turu-uuringute AS | 22 | **26** | 15 | 16 | - | 6 | 6 | 9 | **4** |
| Jan 2015 | TNS Emor | **25** | 22 | 15 | 18 | 2 | 5 | 8 | 4 | **3** |
| Dec 2014 | Turu-uuringute AS | 26 | **27** | 15 | 19 | 3 | 4 | 1 | 4 | **1** |
| Dec 2014 | TNS Emor | **32** | 23 | 16 | 21 | 2 | 2 | 1 | 3 | **9** |
| Nov 2014 | TNS Emor | **29** | 22 | 18 | 22 | 4 | 2 | 2 | 1 | **7** |
| Oct 2014 | TNS Emor | **27** | **27** | 16 | 19 | 3 | 3 | 2 | 3 | Tie |
| Sep 2014 | TNS Emor | **27** | 26 | 18 | 23 | 3 | 2 | Did not exist | 1 | **1** |
| Aug 2014 | TNS Emor | **29** | 25 | 15 | 26 | 1 | 4 | Did not exist | 0 | **4** |
| Jul 2014 | TNS Emor | **31** | 24 | 16 | 24 | 1 | 3 | Did not exist | 1 | **7** |
| Jun 2014 | TNS Emor | **31** | 24 | 14 | 25 | 2 | 2 | Did not exist | 2 | **7** |
| May 2014 | TNS Emor | **29** | 24 | 15 | 27 | 3 | 2 | Did not exist | 2 | **2** |
| Apr 2014 | TNS Emor | 25 | 22 | 19 | **28** | 1 | 3 | Did not exist | 2 | **3** |
| 26 March 2014 | **Taavi Rõivas' cabinet is sworn in** | | | | | | | Did not exist | | |
| Mar 2014 | TNS Emor | 24 | **27** | 16 | 26 | 2 | 2 | Did not exist | 3 | **1** |
| Feb 2014 | TNS Emor | 21 | **27** | 19 | 26 | 2 | 2 | Did not exist | 3 | **1** |
| Jan 2014 | TNS Emor | 24 | **25** | 22 | 23 | 2 | 2 | Did not exist | 2 | **1** |
| Dec 2013 | TNS Emor | 19 | **32** | 20 | 23 | 3 | 2 | Did not exist | 1 | **9** |
| Nov 2013 | TNS Emor | 18 | **29** | 22 | 23 | 2 | 3 | Did not exist | 3 | **7** |
| Oct 2013 | TNS Emor | 22 | **29** | 20 | 20 | 1 | 4 | Did not exist | 4 | **7** |
| Sep 2013 | TNS Emor | 21 | **29** | 18 | 23 | 4 | 3 | Did not exist | 2 | **6** |
| Aug 2013 | TNS Emor | 20 | **26** | 14 | 25 | 5 | 4 | Did not exist | 6 | **1** |
| Jul 2013 | TNS Emor | 24 | **28** | 14 | 26 | 3 | 2 | Did not exist | 3 | **2** |
| Jun 2013 | TNS Emor | 24 | **28** | 14 | 26 | 2 | 3 | Did not exist | 3 | **2** |
| May 2013 | TNS Emor | 24 | **26** | 15 | **26** | 2 | 3 | Did not exist | 4 | Tie |
| Apr 2013 | TNS Emor | 25 | 24 | 13 | **27** | 3 | 3 | Did not exist | 5 | **2** |
| Mar 2013 | TNS Emor | 25 | 26 | 15 | **27** | 3 | 1 | Did not exist | 3 | **1** |
| Feb 2013 | TNS Emor | 23 | **26** | 17 | **26** | 4 | 2 | Did not exist | 2 | Tie |
| Jan 2013 | TNS Emor | 20 | **28** | 16 | 27 | 5 | 2 | Did not exist | 2 | **1** |
| Dec 2012 | TNS Emor | 22 | 24 | 18 | **28** | 3 | 1 | Did not exist | 4 | **4** |
| Nov 2012 | TNS Emor | **26** | 23 | 17 | 25 | 3 | 1 | Did not exist | 5 | **1** |
| Oct 2012 | TNS Emor | **32** | 25 | 13 | 22 | 4 | 1 | Did not exist | 3 | **7** |
| Sep 2012 | TNS Emor | **33** | 24 | 11 | 24 | 4 | 0 | Did not exist | 4 | **9** |
| Aug 2012 | TNS Emor | **39** | 20 | 13 | 20 | 3 | 1 | Did not exist | 4 | **19** |
| Jul 2012 | TNS Emor | **34** | 22 | 15 | 25 | 2 | 1 | Did not exist | 4 | **1** |
| Jun 2012 | TNS Emor | **31** | 23 | 14 | 24 | 4 | 0 | Did not exist | 4 | **7** |
| May 2012 | TNS Emor | **30** | 19 | 17 | 29 | 3 | 0 | Did not exist | 2 | **1** |
| Apr 2012 | TNS Emor | 27 | 25 | 13 | **29** | 3 | 0 | Did not exist | 3 | **2** |
| Mar 2012 | TNS Emor | 29 | 23 | 12 | **30** | 2 | 3 | Did not exist | 1 | **1** |
| Feb 2012 | TNS Emor | **28** | 26 | 14 | 22 | 5 | 4 | Did not exist | 1 | **2** |
| Jan 2012 | TNS Emor | **30** | 27 | 13 | 19 | 4 | 3 | Did not exist | 4 | **3** |
| Dec 2011 | TNS Emor | **33** | 22 | 16 | 22 | 4 | 2 | Did not exist | 1 | **11** |
| Nov 2011 | TNS Emor | **31** | 23 | 16 | 24 | 4 | 2 | Did not exist | 1 | **7** |
| Oct 2011 | TNS Emor | **32** | 20 | 16 | 23 | 4 | 2 | Did not exist | 3 | **9** |
| Sep 2011 | TNS Emor | **31** | 24 | 16 | 22 | 4 | 2 | Did not exist | 1 | **7** |
| Aug 2011 | TNS Emor | **29** | 21 | 18 | 24 | 3 | 3 | Did not exist | 2 | **5** |
| Jul 2011 | TNS Emor | **31** | 21 | 15 | 24 | 3 | 2 | Did not exist | 4 | **7** |
| Jun 2011 | TNS Emor | **33** | 22 | 13 | 21 | 5 | 2 | Did not exist | 4 | **7** |
| May 2011 | TNS Emor | **33** | 20 | 17 | 22 | 4 | 1 | Did not exist | 3 | **11** |
| Apr 2011 | TNS Emor | **31** | 22 | 19 | 19 | 5 | 1 | Did not exist | 3 | **9** |
| **6 Mar 2011** | **Election results** | **28.6** | **23.3** | **20.5** | **17.1** | **3.8** | **2.1** | Did not exist | **4.6** | **5.3** |

== Results ==
| Party | Votes | % | Seats | +/– |
|---|---|---|---|---|
| Estonian Reform Party | 158,970 | 27.69 | 30 | –3 |
| Estonian Centre Party | 142,458 | 24.81 | 27 | +1 |
| Social Democratic Party | 87,189 | 15.19 | 15 | –4 |
| Pro Patria and Res Publica Union | 78,699 | 13.71 | 14 | –9 |
| Estonian Free Party | 49,882 | 8.69 | 8 | New |
| Conservative People's Party | 46,772 | 8.15 | 7 | +7 |
| Estonian Greens | 5,193 | 0.90 | 0 | 0 |
| Party of People's Unity | 2,289 | 0.40 | 0 | New |
| Estonian Independence Party | 1,047 | 0.18 | 0 | 0 |
| Estonian United Left Party | 764 | 0.13 | 0 | New |
| Independents | 887 | 0.15 | 0 | 0 |
| Total | 574,150 | 100.00 | 101 | 0 |
| Valid votes | 574,150 | 99.35 | | |
| Invalid/blank votes | 3,760 | 0.65 | | |
| Total votes | 577,910 | 100.00 | | |
| Registered voters/turnout | 899,793 | 64.23 | | |
Source: VVK

== Aftermath ==
The Reform Party started coalition talks with the Social Democrats, Pro Patria and Res Publica Union (IRL) and the Free Party. After nearly three weeks of negotiations, the Free Party left the coalition talks due to disagreements with the Reform Party and the IRL. The three remaining parties signed the coalition treaty on 8 April, and the cabinet took office on 9 April.

== See also ==
- Members of the 13th Riigikogu
