= Andres Metsoja =

Estonian politician (born 1978)

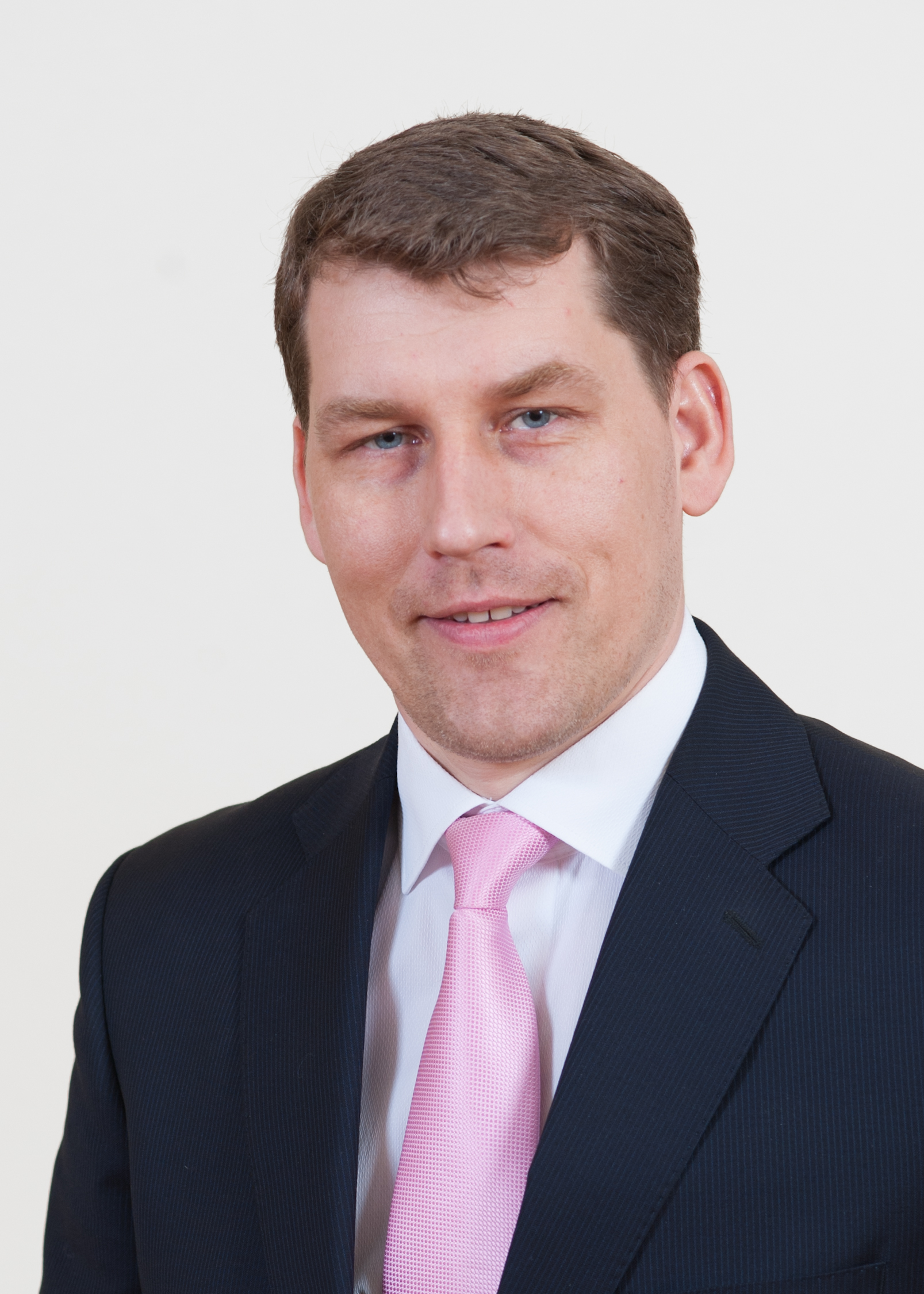

Member of the XIII and XIV Riigikogu

Pärnu County Governor
- In office 2010–2015

Chairman of Pärnu City Council
- Incumbent
- Assumed office 2017

Personal details
- Born: November 25, 1978 (age 47) Vändra, Estonia
- Party: Isamaa
- Education: International University Audentes; University of Tartu
- Occupation: Politician

Andres Metsoja (born 25 November 1978 in Vändra, Pärnu County) is an Estonian politician. He has been a member of the XIII and XIV Riigikogu.

== Biography ==
He graduated from International University Audentes with a degree in business management. He also studied strategic management at the University of Tartu.

From 2010 to 2015 he was Pärnu County Governor.

Since 2004 he has been a member of Res Publica/Pro Patria and Res Publica Union/Isamaa Party.

Since 2017 he has served as the chairman of Pärnu City Council.
