= Apostol Paviel =

Sidewheel steamer built for a Russian shipping company, later minesweeper

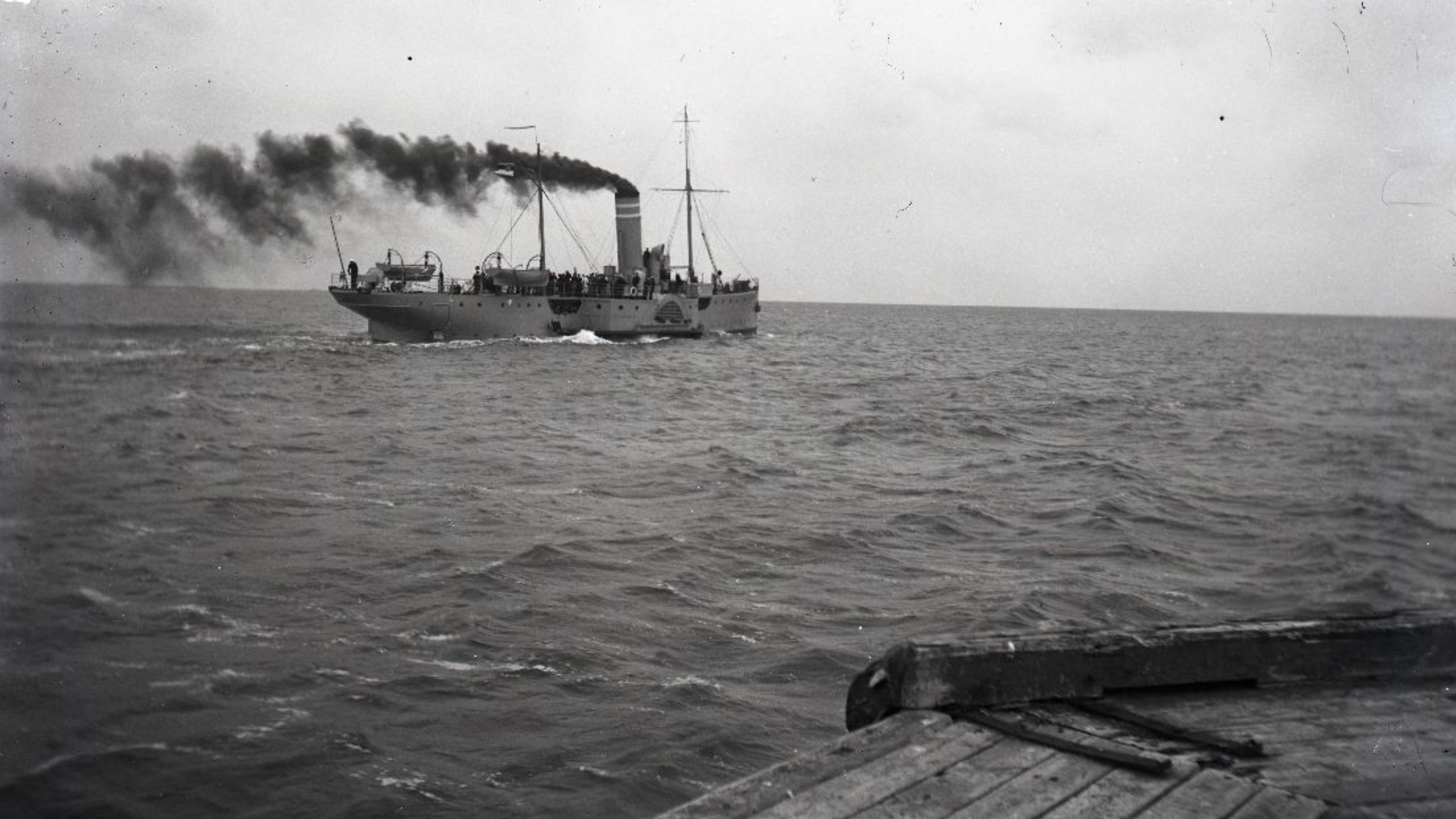
- Ristna on the roadstead of the port of Roomassaare

History

Russia
- Name: Apostol Paviel
- Laid down: 1906
- Launched: 1906
- Out of service: April 26, 1915

Russia
- Name: TSzcz No. 19
- Launched: July 9, 1915

Finland
- Name: Pavel
- Launched: 1918
- Out of service: April 19, 1920

Estonia
- Name: Ristna
- Launched: May 13, 1920
- Out of service: August 18, 1940

Soviet Union
- Name: Ristna
- Launched: August 18, 1940
- Out of service: December 24, 1955
- Fate: scrapped in 1958

General characteristics
- Class & type: passenger ship, cargo ship, minesweeper, minelayer
- Displacement: 1906: 501 tonnes; 1937: 600 tonnes
- Length: 1906: 58.2 m (190 ft 11 in); 1937: 60.1 m (197 ft 2 in)
- Draft: 1906: 1.8 m (5 ft 11 in); 1937: 1.8–2.35 m (5 ft 11 in – 7 ft 9 in)
- Propulsion: steam boiler; compound steam engine with a power of 728 hp (543 kW); side paddle wheels
- Speed: 1906: 13 kn (24 km/h; 15 mph); 1937: 12.5 kn (23.2 km/h; 14.4 mph)
- Range: 1,000 nmi (1,900 km; 1,200 mi) at 8 knots (15 km/h; 9.2 mph)
- Complement: 1915: 51 people; 1937: 39 people (at peace), 50 people (at war)
- Armament: 1915: 1 × 47 mm gun, 1 × km; 1937: 175 mines of the 1908 model

Apostol Paviel was a passenger-cargo, sidewheel steamer built for a Russian shipping company. During World War I, it was requisitioned by the Imperial Russian Navy and converted into a minesweeper. In 1918, it was handed over to the Red Finns by the Bolsheviks, captured by the Whites, and sold to Estonia. In the Estonian Navy, it was renamed Ristna. Along with other Estonian vessels, it was taken over by the Soviet Union in 1940. The ship survived World War II and appeared in Soviet films. It was scrapped in 1958.

== Construction and technical description ==
=== Order and construction ===
Apostol Paviel was ordered by the Onega Steamship Company based in Petrozavodsk. The order called for two fast passenger-cargo ships with shallow drafts. The design was modeled after paddle steamers (packet boats) operating in the English Channel. It was built in Greenock by a company named Grangemouth and Greenock Dockyard, (Note: Gajduk, Łapszyn & Sammalsoo (2010, p. 25) provide the name as Grangemoot, Dokjard & K° while Õun (2014, p. 57) Greenock Dockyard Co.) bearing the construction number 283. The ship was launched and completed in 1906. (Note: Ehlers (2012, p. 54) provides the construction dates of 1906–1908.) Simultaneously, a twin ship named Apostol Piotr was also constructed. The total cost for both ships was 150,000 rubles.

=== Technical description of the ship (Note: Gajduk, Łapszyn & Sammalsoo (2010, p. 25) provide separate values for the two twin ships. Õun (2014, pp. 57–58) lists the same values for both ships. Ehlers (2012, p. 54) also provides common data, but after the renovation for the Estonian Navy. Therefore, the data from the Russian study is presented first. These are also included in the infobox.) ===
The paddle steamer had a length of either 58.2 or 57.88 meters, a width including the paddle wheels of 15.6 or 15.35 meters (measured without the paddle wheels 7.95 meters). The displacement was 501 tons, the standard draft was 1.8 meters, and the maximum draft was 2.35 meters. The ship could carry a cargo with a total capacity of 470 GRT.

The ship was powered by a two-cylinder compound steam engine with a cylindrical boiler, with an indicated power of 728 HP, which gave it a maximum speed of 13 knots. (Note: Õun (2014, p. 58) gives a range of 12–13.5, depending on the source.) A coal supply of either 262 or 54 tons allowed the ship to travel 1,000 nautical miles at 8 knots, or 800 nautical miles at 10 knots. The ship's bilge pump system could remove up to 60 tons of water per hour.

== Service ==
=== Passenger ship ===
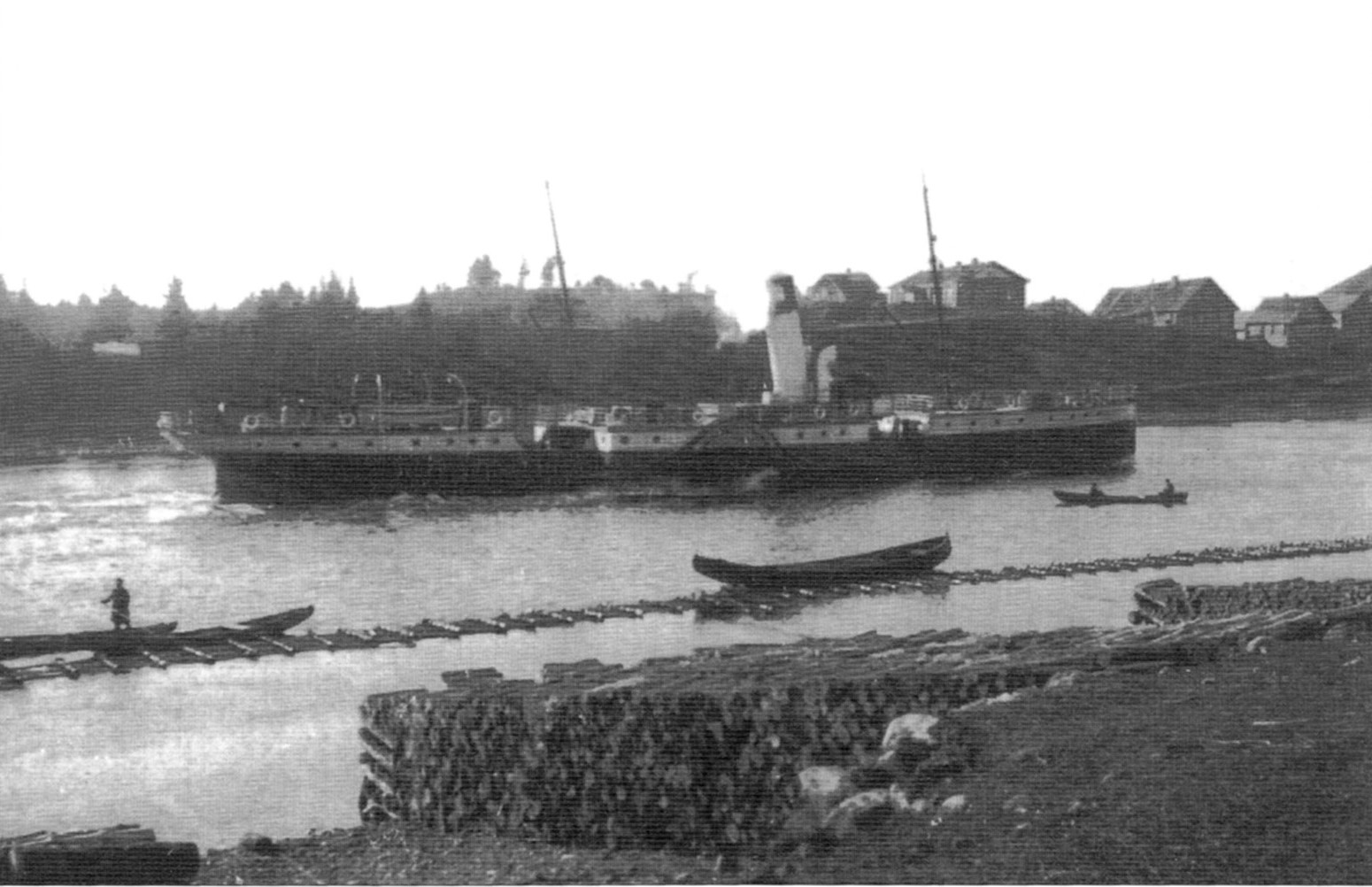
Apostol Paviel on the Svir river

Apostol Paviel entered service in 1906. The ship's name referred to a popular saint in northern Russia. Additionally, the same name was given to the first commercial ship built in Russia according to Western standards. The first captain of the ship was Nikolai Varzugin. The ship operated on Lake Onega and nearby waterways on regular routes, as well as carrying pilgrims to the island of Valaam to visit the monastery there. It mainly wintered on the Svir river, where the company had workshops. During this time, the entire crew except for the engineers was released to go home, while the engineers performed minor repairs. A major overhaul in St. Petersburg was necessary as early as 1906 due to the crew's unfamiliarity with the ship's modern mechanisms.

=== Russian ship ===
In the early months of World War I, a mine warfare campaign began in the Baltic Sea. Due to the insufficient number of minesweepers in the Baltic Fleet, the Admiralty decided to acquire civilian ships with shallow drafts for this purpose. Apostol Paviel was added to the list of recommended ships, compiled in February 1915 by Captain 2nd Rank Nikolai Tyrkov. A special commission led by N.N. Apostolov inspected the ship on May 5, and on May 12, (Note: Ehlers (2012, p. 54) gives the date as April 26.) the owners handed over the confiscated vessel to the Imperial Russian Navy. Apostol Paviel was valued at 190,648 rubles. It was added to the fleet list on 3 June 1915. In the following months, it was converted into a minesweeper at the Admiralty Shipyards, receiving the designation No. 19. The ship was armed with a 47 mm Hotchkiss et Cie gun and a machine gun. The entire conversion cost 88,200 rubles. The ship's new crew consisted of 51 people, including 3 officers. Early in its naval service, stability issues were noted due to its shallow draft.

Together with its twin minesweeper No. 18 (former Apostol Piotr), it initially served as a depot ship for minesweepers in Reval, and from 1916 as a minesweeper in the 4th Minesweeper Division. The ships were relocated to Rauma on 8 July 1917, and on July 10 participated in their first combat mine-sweeping operation of a minefield laid a month earlier (June 7) by the submarine SM UC-58. Out of the 18 mines laid by the submarine, the minesweepers managed to find 9 submerged at a depth of 2 meters. Five were neutralized on July 10, three more the next day, and the last one on July 12. Of the mines recovered on the first day, three were destroyed by artillery fire, and the remaining six were salvaged. After three days of sweeping, the ships headed to Åbo for coal and sweeping gear supplies. Searches continued upon their return on July 16 but no further mines were found at the approach to the Rauma base. Both minesweepers underwent boiler cleaning in Helsingfors on July 21, and on July 27, searched for minefields between Odensholm and Neugrund with negative results.

In August, both minesweepers were grouped with the ships of the 3rd Division. Along with the minesweeper Zashchitnik, the ships set out on August 24 to the vicinity of Vormsi island, where they met with the 1st Division of minesweeper cutters. The entire group headed to Åbo for supplies; due to fuel shortages, the ships stayed in port for three days (from August 31 to September 3). From September 3 to 8, the group removed a minefield laid near Enskär. The twin ships joined the operation on September 4, but due to low temperatures, the other ships did not participate. Due to a storm, the operation was halted, with the ships docking in Åbo on September 5 and Uusikaupunki on September 6. The operation was completed in the remaining two days.

After completing the task, the entire group headed to the base in Lappvik, arriving on September 13. Number 19, along with the main group (but without its twin No. 18), immediately set out to the port of Rohuküla in the Moonsund Archipelago. This group (numbers 14, 15, 16, 17, 19, Zapal, and Kapsiul) on September 15 searched Stapelbotten shallow, and on September 19, cleared the area around Gräsgrund island. These tasks were completed on September 21. That day, three mines were caught in the sweep, but due to weather conditions, two were left near the village of Dirhami, resulting in the area being closed to nighttime navigation.

The winter of 1917/1918 was spent in Helsinki. After the October Revolution, both twin minesweepers came under Bolshevik control, who handed them over to the Finnish Socialist Workers' Republic on 15 March 1918 due to the ongoing Finnish Civil War. However, by 21 April 1918, the ships were taken over by the Germans, and in the third week of April, they were seized by the White Finns in Helsinki. They were deemed unsuitable for the navy by the war prize commission (the ship changed its number from 19 to 6) and were sold to a private owner on 24 August 1918. The first buyer, B. Cederholm, sold them a few weeks later to G. Westerlund, and they entered the fleet of AB Nya Warfet or West OY. The paddle steamers were measured on December 23, and in the spring of 1919, were registered in Helsinki as passenger ships; the former Apostol Paviel was renamed Pavel. However, they did not enter service and awaited a new buyer.

=== Estonian ship ===
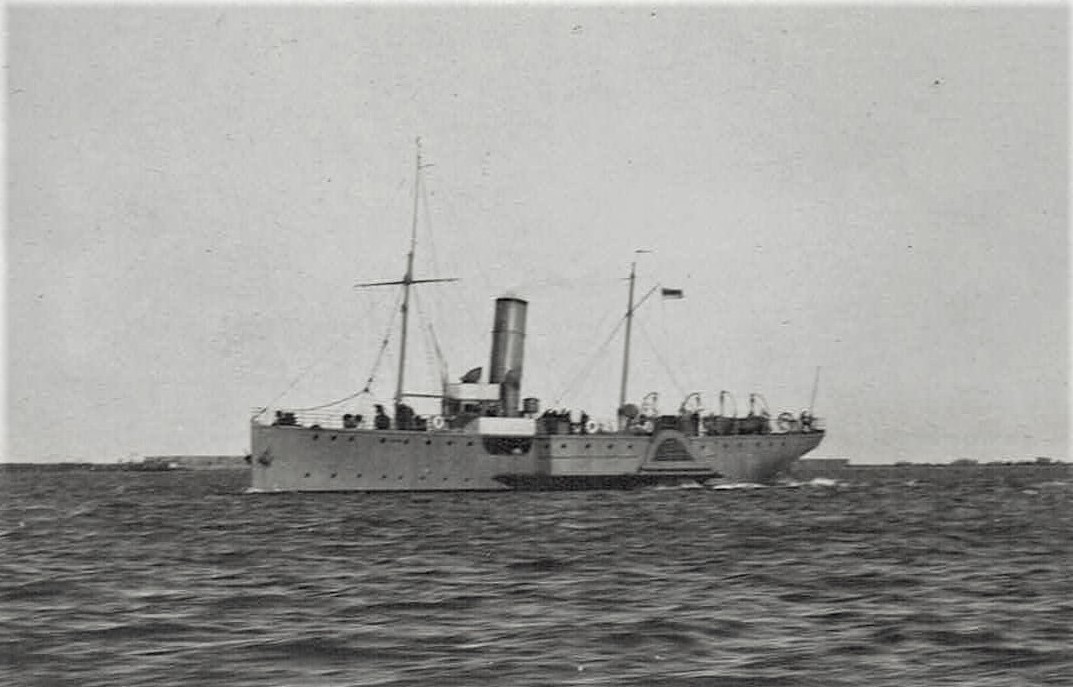
Ristna at sea

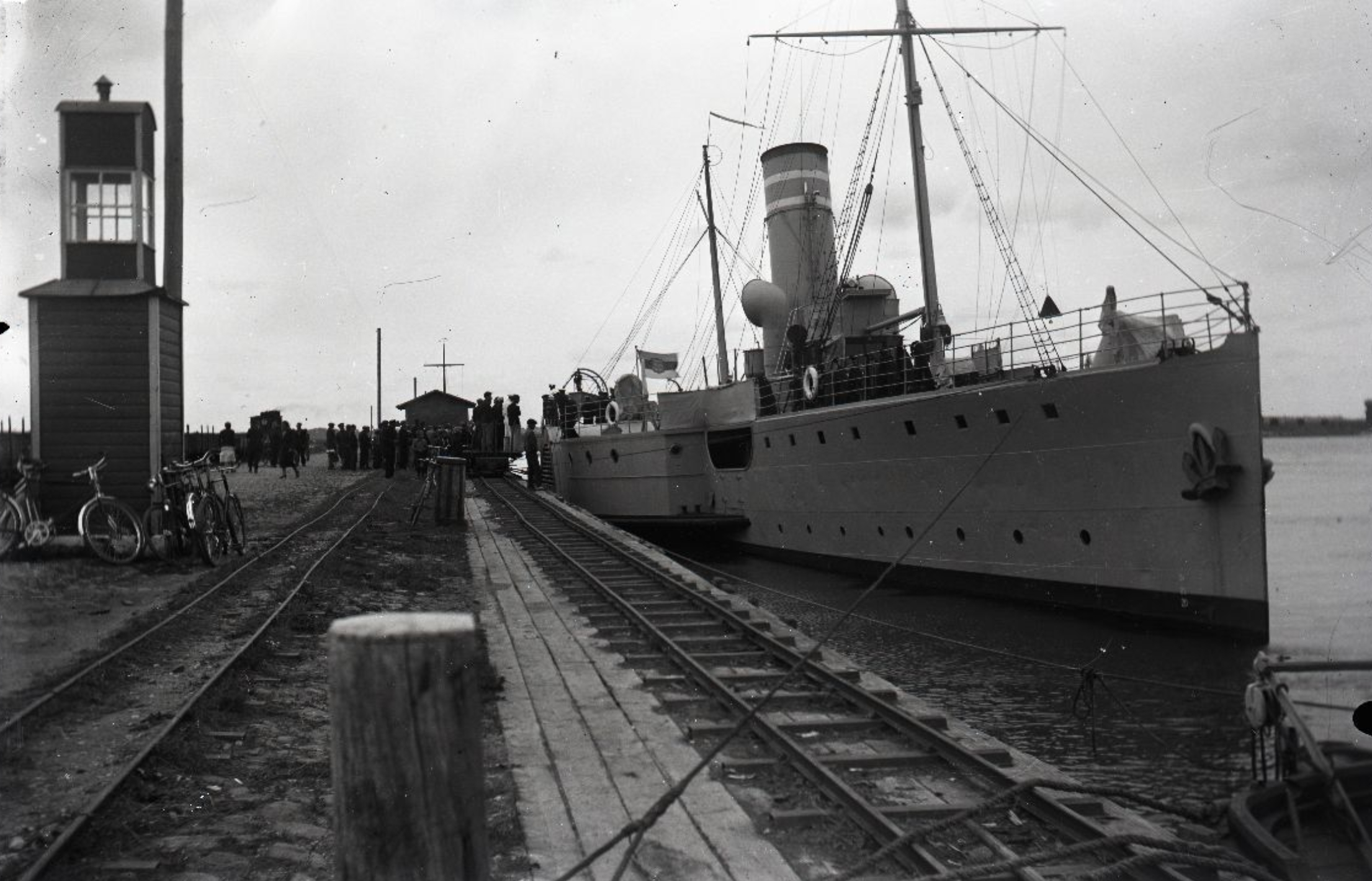
Ristna in the port of Roomassaare

After successfully concluding the war with the Bolsheviks, one of the primary goals of the Estonian naval forces was to clear the commercial shipping lanes of mines laid during recent conflicts, especially on the route from Tallinn to Osmussaar. This task was assigned to the Minesweeper Division (Estonian: Traalerite Divisjon), which, however, consisted of vessels suitable only for coastal operations. To enable operations on open waters, the Ministry of Foreign Affairs began searching for suitable minesweepers. The Estonians decided to purchase the ships Peeter and Pavel stationed in Helsinki. The purchase agreement was signed on 19 April 1920. Estonia paid 1 million Finnish marks in goods for both units, although they were valued at only a quarter of this amount. On May 13, Pavel received an Estonian crew and was listed in the Estonian Navy as Ristna. (Note: Ehlers (2012, p. 54) most likely mixes up the assignment of names to the two twin ships. According to him, no. 18 received the name Ristna and no. 19 the name Suurop. However, both Gajduk, Łapszyn & Sammalsoo (2010, p. 31), and Õun (2014, p. 58) present the opposite assignment. In this article, the version from these works has been adopted as more credible. It would be problematic to conduct a dual narrative from this point.) Both vessels (Peeter as Suurop) reached the capital Tallinn on May 18. In the capital port, the ships were re-equipped with minesweeping gear and underwent minor repairs. Both ships were used for minesweeping from June 27 to November 25.

After a year of service, the ships returned to civilian duty. This was related to transferring the task of mine clearance from the Ministry of War to the Ministry of Commerce and Industry. The proposal was made by the naval leadership in December 1920. The reason for the initiative was the previous transfer of auxiliary floating units to the civilian ministry, which now had to be borrowed to support minesweeping. The navy lacked funds for both this and for crew salaries during the winter. As a result, both Ristna and the other ships of the Minesweeper Division were transferred to the Ministry of Commerce and Industry on 15 January 1921. In 1921, Ristna participated in minesweeping operations, after which Estonian territorial waters were declared free of mines. Mine search continued in subsequent years only in coastal waters, which were suitable for shallow draft vessels.

Due to their unsuitability for further tasks, the twin ships were transferred to the state carrier on 10 January 1922 to be used as passenger or transport ships. That year, Ristna began operating on the Rohuküla–Kuivastu–Roomassaare route. The venture was not profitable, incurring losses even the following year despite extending the route to include Ruhnu and Riga, as private carriers were too competitive. Consequently, the shipping operation was ceased, and the ship remained idle in Tallinn port until 1926.

Mine blockades were an important part of the Estonian Republic's maritime defense concept. For their implementation, minelayers were needed. Due to the idleness of Ristna and Suurop, it was decided to convert these ships into minelayers. Modernization work was carried out in Tallinn port during the winter of 1926/1927. According to one source, the ships were transferred to the Ministry of War in 1925.

After the renovation, Ristna had a displacement of 600 tons, a length of 60.1 meters, and a width of 7.9 meters (15.35 meters including paddle wheels). The maximum draft was 1.8 meters at the bow and 2.35 meters at the stern. (Note: Ehlers (2012, p. 54) gives the figures: total length 60.5 meters, width 15.5 meters, and maximum draft of 2.2 meters.) The main structural changes were related to the function of laying and storing mines. Mines could be laid from a covered mine deck, with two chutes placed at the stern on both sides. Mine tracks were set on both the mine deck and the upper deck, with mines passing between decks via special chutes located in the central part of the ship. The vessel could carry a total of 175 contact mines of the 1908 model. Spotlights removed from the scrapped Lembit were mounted on the paddle wheel covers. The ship could not only lay mines but also neutralize them. For this purpose, it was equipped with a Schulz sweep and a machine gun, which also served for anti-aircraft defense. The absence of deck artillery (Note: Ehlers (2012, p. 54) states that the unit's armament after overhaul consisted of two guns: one of 76 mm caliber and the other of 40 mm caliber.) was to be compensated by a Bofors 40 mm gun, but the order placed in Sweden was not fulfilled before the war. In this configuration, the ship's maximum speed was 12.5 knots.

The ship joined the Marine Division on 1 April 1927. The regular crew in the navy consisted of 39 people, including 4 officers. In wartime, the crew was to be expanded to 50 people. Ristna and Suurop participated in representational tasks, visiting neighboring Latvia and domestic ports. They primarily engaged in training exercises. Training included typical mine warfare actions such as laying and sweeping mines and conducting airdrops in collaboration with the Estonian Land Forces and the Estonian Defence League, as well as coastal artillery bombardment, where the ships towed shooting targets. Exercises took place in the West Estonian Archipelago (Kuivastu, Kassari), in the Tallinn area, and in Hara Bay. Particularly important exercises were held in the Kuivastu area in 1930 and 1931, involving both Estonian and Latvian forces.

The first significant action of the ship related to the outbreak of World War II was the search for the escaped interned Polish submarine ORP Orzeł. Ristna searched for the Polish submarine between the islands of Aegna, Naissaar, and Tallinn shallow from 18 to 19 September. After a torpedo attack on the twin Suurop on September 19, both ships exchanged training mines for combat ones in the Paljassaare Harbour. Combat readiness was maintained on the ship until December 10.

The Estonian staff divided the Marine Division on 1 April 1940, so that the former Apostols were assigned to the new Mine-Sweeping Division (Estonian: Traaler-veeskjate divisjon). This division was relocated to the port of Loksa on May 10, then began naval exercises in Hara Bay. In breaks from maneuvers, the minesweepers removed mines laid by the Finns near Juminda during the war with the Soviet Union. While exercising in Hara Bay, the Soviet Navy's actions began on June 14, initiating a blockade of Estonian units. After about two weeks, the mine-laying ships began returning to Tallinn, traveling individually and escorted by Soviet ships, eventually docking at the Old City Harbour. The only activity of the units in July was the evacuation of soldiers from bases on Aegna and Naissaar islands at the beginning of the month.

=== Soviet ship ===
Active preparations to integrate the ship into the Soviet Baltic Fleet began in July 1940. At that time, a political officer was assigned to the vessel, and the crew was obliged to participate in various communist propaganda activities. Ristna was incorporated into the Soviet Navy based on the order from the People's Commissar of the Navy dated 18 (Note: Ehlers (2012, p. 54) provides the date as August 13.) August 1940, numbered 00208, retaining its Estonian name. The formal handover of the ship occurred only on October 30. Ristna was listed in the fleet inventory as part of the Water Area Protection Group of the Main Base of the Red Baltic Fleet, functioning as a minelayer.

During the winter of 1940/1941, the ships stayed in the port of Tallinn, where they provided heat to other Soviet Navy vessels. In the spring, they performed guard duties at the port's roadstead. After the commencement of the German invasion of the Soviet Union, the fleet's command decided to dispense with the Estonian crew members, despite the previous political work. They were demobilized in early July, replaced by sailors from Kronstadt and other minelayers of the Baltic Fleet.

In July, the ship laid mines in the waters of the Gulf of Finland and the Gulf of Riga (in the Irbe Strait). During an operation in the latter, on either July 23 or 27, after laying 15 mines, a mine exploded in the chute. The explosion damaged the ship's stern, but it managed to reach the village of Triigi using its paddle wheels, from where it was towed to the port of Kronstadt. After undergoing repairs there, the vessel was incorporated on September 7 into the 3rd Division of the Mine Detachment (Russian: 3-й дивизион Отряда загруждения). In September and October, Ristna laid minefields in the eastern part of the Gulf of Finland. From November until the end of the war, it served as a depot ship for the Water Area Protection Group of the Main Base of the Red Baltic Fleet.

After a brief post-war hiatus, Ristna was remobilized on 15 February 1946 as a minelayer. The ship was used for training purposes in the North Baltic Fleet. Besides its military activities, the vessel was also used in Soviet cinema, being leased out for this purpose by the Lenfilm studio. The ship was featured in a total of three film productions.

Ristna ended its service on 24 December 1955. On 7 April 1956, it was transferred to the administrative department (Russian: Отдел фондового имущества). In 1957, the ship was disarmed. The vessel was to be handed over to the Leningrad Komsomol on July 20 and, according to some sources, was leased out by the Lenfilm studio. (Note: Both Gajduk, Łapszyn & Sammalsoo (2010, p. 39) and Õun (2014, p. 59) write about the utilization of the ship during its service period. Additionally, Õun (2014, p. 59) and Ehlers (2012, p. 54) state that it was leased out a year before being scrapped. Theoretically, therefore, the vessel could have been used during two different periods.) The ship was scrapped at the beginning of 1958 in Glavvtorchermet.

== Bibliography ==
- Ehlers, Hartmut (2012). "Marynarka Wojenna i Paramilitarne Siły Morskie Estonii 1918-1940". Okręty Wojenne (in Polish). 111. Tarnowskie Góry. ISSN 1231-014X.
- Gajduk, A. A.; Łapszyn, R.; Sammalsoo, P. (2010). "Dorogi wojny bywszych «Apostołow»". Gangut (in Russian). 56.
- Õun, M. (2014). Eesti Merejõudude laevu 1918–40 (in Estonian). Tallinn: Sentinel.
