= Kotka (disambiguation) =

Kotka is a town and municipality in Finland.

Kotka may also refer to:

== People with the surname ==
- Mimmi Kotka (born 1981), Swedish athlete
- Siret Kotka (born 1986), Estonian politician
- Taavi Kotka (born 1979), Estonian businessman

== Places ==
- Kotka, Harju County, a village in Kuusalu Parish, Harju County, Estonia
- Kotka, Võru County, a village in Rõuge Parish, Võru County, Estonia
- Kotka Piran, a village in Khyber-Pakhtunkhwa, Pakistan

== Other uses ==
- 2737 Kotka, a minor planet
- IKV-3 Kotka, a Finnish sailplane
- Kotka (crater), on Mars
- VL Kotka, a Finnish military aircraft
