= Valgejõe =

Village in Estonia

Coordinates: 59°28′N 25°48′E

- Village
- Interactive map of Valgejõe
- Country: Estonia
- County: Harju County
- Parish: Kuusalu Parish
- Time zone: UTC+2 (EET)
  - Summer (DST): UTC+3 (EEST)

Valgejõe is a village in Kuusalu Parish, Harju County, in northern Estonia. It is located on the crossing of the Tallinn–Narva road (part of the E20) and the Valgejõgi River.

Valgejõe (white river) dates from the 13th century, located initially in today's Vanaküla (old village). In the early 17th century the centre of the village shifted some kilometers south to the area of Tallinn-Narva road river crossing and the tavern. In north from Vanaküla split Parksi and Nõmmeveski. Situated on the historic division line of Harju and Viru counties the local administrative borders have constantly changed here. Since the 1939 reform however, when the county border skipped a few kilometers eastward, Valgejõe, Vanaküla and Parksi lands were moved between multiple different administrative units, but always together. That has laid basis for emergence of historic triple village.

== Beginning of the village ==
On 20 September 1290, Danish King Erik Menved expanded the lands of cistercians from Gotland around the Kolga sub-monastery, listing among other villages Witena/Valgejõe. The commemoration stone to first written notion of the village was opened here in 1992, carved by Andres Allmägi from Parksi.

== Tavern and forestry ==
On 9 December 1585, right after the sudden death of Pontus De la Gardie, his cousin, Captain Johan De la Blanque, ordered the revisory of Kolga manor, which also included the rewrite of the rental agreement of Witenå tavern. The date of the tavern's first mentioning is celebrated also as the birthday of Veinivilla winery, which settled here in 2014. Last tavern-keeper Jaaska Viikmann closed the business near the end of the 19th century. From the beginning of the 20th century the house was used by Kolga majorate manor's (fidei-comiss) forest managers and later by Valgejõe forestry.

== Great Northern War ==
In the Battle of Läsna-Valgejõe on 16 June 1704, 5000 Russian cavalry and 1000 infantry under the colonel Karl Evald von Rönne forced to flee from fortified positions 1400 Swedish cavalry under command of major-general Anton von Schlippenbach. On the Russian side 100 were killed, on the Swedish side 60 men. About 50 Swedish cavalrymen were imprisoned, including Oberst Fritz Wachtmeister. According to popular memory Russians were buried to Russian hill, a few hundred meters from here towards Tallinn.

== War of Independence ==
The Battle of Valgejõe took place 22–24 December 1918. Retreating were 4th and 5th regiments of the Estonian Popular Army and on offensive Revel's (Tallinn) Communist Rifle Regiment (mostly red Estonians and Finns), supported by seamen's squad. In the Popular Army 234 men were engaged, 2 killed. On red's side 1 was injured. A commemorating stone to the battle site was placed here on its 100th anniversary.

== Bridge and border ==
The road from Tallinn to Narva through Valgejõe dates at least since the late 17th century. According to popular memory already since the Swedish period here was also the 5-arched bridge, but the first documented evidence of the bridge comes only from 1784 delineanation map of ancient counties Harjumaa and Virumaa. Next to the old limestone bridge was built a new crossing using concrete in 1914, but this was blown up by retreating German troops in September 1944. After several temporary wooden constructions the concrete bridge was rebuilt only in 1957. A new highway built for Tallinn Olympic regatta redirected since 1981 most of the traffic away from the heart of village.
