= Apostol Piotr =

Sidewheel steamer built for a Russian shipping company, later minesweeper

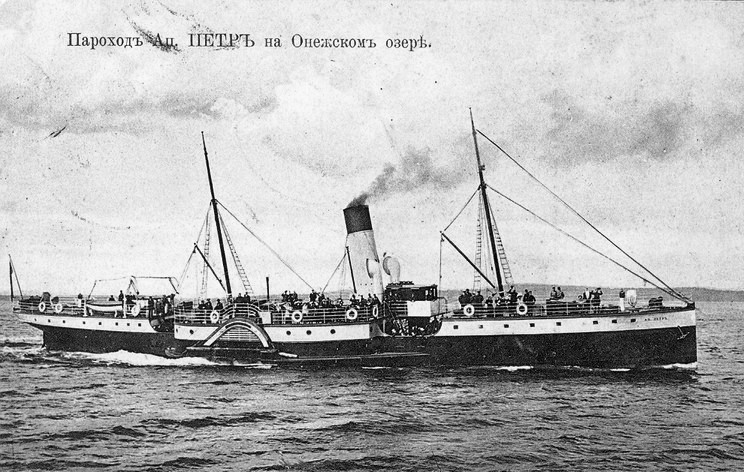
- Apostol Piotr on Lake Onega

History

Russia
- Name: Apostol Piotr
- Laid down: 1906
- Launched: 1906
- Out of service: April 26, 1915

Russia
- Name: TSzcz No. 18
- Launched: July 9, 1915

Finland
- Name: Peeter
- Launched: 1918
- Out of service: April 19, 1920

Estonia
- Name: Suurop
- Launched: May 13, 1920
- Out of service: August 18, 1940

Soviet Union
- Name: Suurop
- Launched: August 18, 1940
- Out of service: August 11, 1941

General characteristics
- Class & type: passenger ship, cargo ship, minesweeper, minelayer
- Displacement: 1906: 499 t (1,100,000 lb); 1937: 600 t (1,300,000 lb)
- Length: 1906: 57.9 m (190 ft 0 in); 1937: 60.1 m (197 ft 2 in)
- Draft: 1906: 1.8 m (5 ft 11 in); 1937: 1.8–2.35 m (5 ft 11 in – 7 ft 9 in)
- Propulsion: steam boiler; compound steam engine with a power of 750 hp; side paddle wheels
- Speed: 1906: 13.5 kn (15.5 mph; 25.0 km/h); 1937: 12.5 kn (14.4 mph; 23.2 km/h)
- Range: 1,000 nautical miles at 8 knots
- Complement: 1915: 51 people; 1937: 39 people (at peace), 50 people (at war)
- Armament: 1915: 1 × 47 mm, 1 × km; 1937: 1 × 40 mm, 175 mines of the 1908 model

Apostol Piotr was a passenger-cargo ship, a side-paddle steamer built for a Russian shipping company. During World War I, it was requisitioned for the needs of the Imperial Russian Navy and converted into a minesweeper. In 1918, it was handed over by the Bolsheviks to the Red Finns, captured by the Whites, and sold to Estonia. In the Estonian Navy, it was named Suurop. Along with the other Estonian vessels, it was taken over by the Soviet Union in 1940. It sank on a mine on 11 August 1941.

== Construction and technical description ==
=== Order and construction ===
Apostol Piotr was ordered by the Oneskie Steamship Company based in Petrozavodsk. The company required two fast passenger-cargo ships with a shallow draft. The design was modeled after paddle steamers (packet boats) operating in the English Channel. It was built in Greenock by a company named Grangemouth and Greenock Dockyard, (Note: Gajduk, Łapszyn & Sammalsoo (2010, p. 25) provide the name as Grangemoot, Dokjard & K° while Õun (2014, p. 57) Greenock Dockyard Co.) The ship was launched and completed in 1906. (Note: Ehlers (2012, p. 54) provides the construction dates of 1906–1908.) Simultaneously, a twin ship named Apostol Paviel was also constructed. The total cost for both ships was 150,000 rubles.

=== Technical description (Note: Gajduk, Łapszyn & Sammalsoo (2010, p. 25) provide separate values for the two twin ships. Õun (2014, pp. 57–58) lists the same values for both ships. Ehlers (2012, p. 54) also provides common data, but after the renovation for the Estonian Navy. Therefore, the data from the Russian study is presented first. These are also included in the infobox.) ===
The length of the steamer was 57.9 or 57.88 meters, with a width of 15.2 or 15.35 meters including the paddle wheels (7.9 or 7.95 meters excluding the paddle wheels). The displacement was 499 tons, with a standard draft of 1.8 meters and a maximum draft of 2.35 meters. The ship could carry a load with a total volume of 470 registered GRT.

The ship was powered by a two-cylinder compound steam engine with a cylindrical boiler, with an indicated power of 750 HP, (Note: Õun (2014, p. 57) gives a value of 728 for both twin ships.) which gave it a maximum speed of 13.5 knots. (Note: Õun (2014, p. 58) gives a range of 12–13.5, depending on the source.) A coal supply of either 262 or 54 tons allowed the ship to travel 1,000 nautical miles at 8 knots, or 800 nautical miles at 10 knots. The ship's bilge pump system could remove up to 60 tons of water per hour.

== Service ==
=== Passenger ship ===
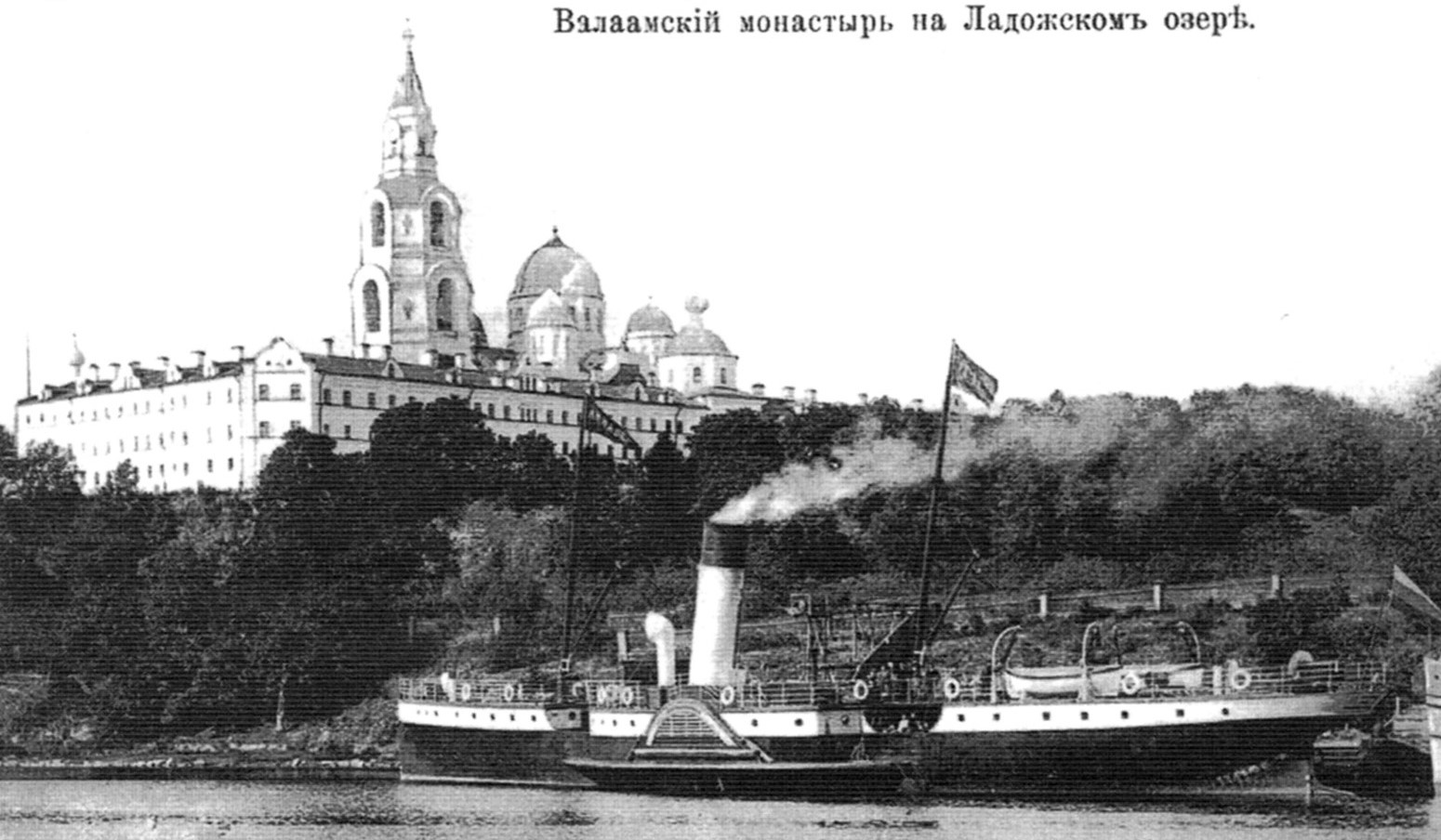
Apostol Piotr and the Valaam Monastery, to which the ship transported pilgrims

Apostol Piotr entered service in 1906. The name of the vessel referred to the popular saint in northern Russia. The first captain of the steamer was Fyodor Matveyevich Ryukhin. The ship operated on Lake Onega and nearby waterways in scheduled voyages, also transporting pilgrims to Valaam island to the monastery located there. The ship spent winters mainly on the Svir river, where the company had workshops. During this time, the entire crew, except for the mechanics, was sent home, while the mechanics carried out minor repairs. A major overhaul in St. Petersburg was necessary as early as 1906, due to the crew's unfamiliarity with the modern mechanisms of the vessel.

=== Russian ship ===
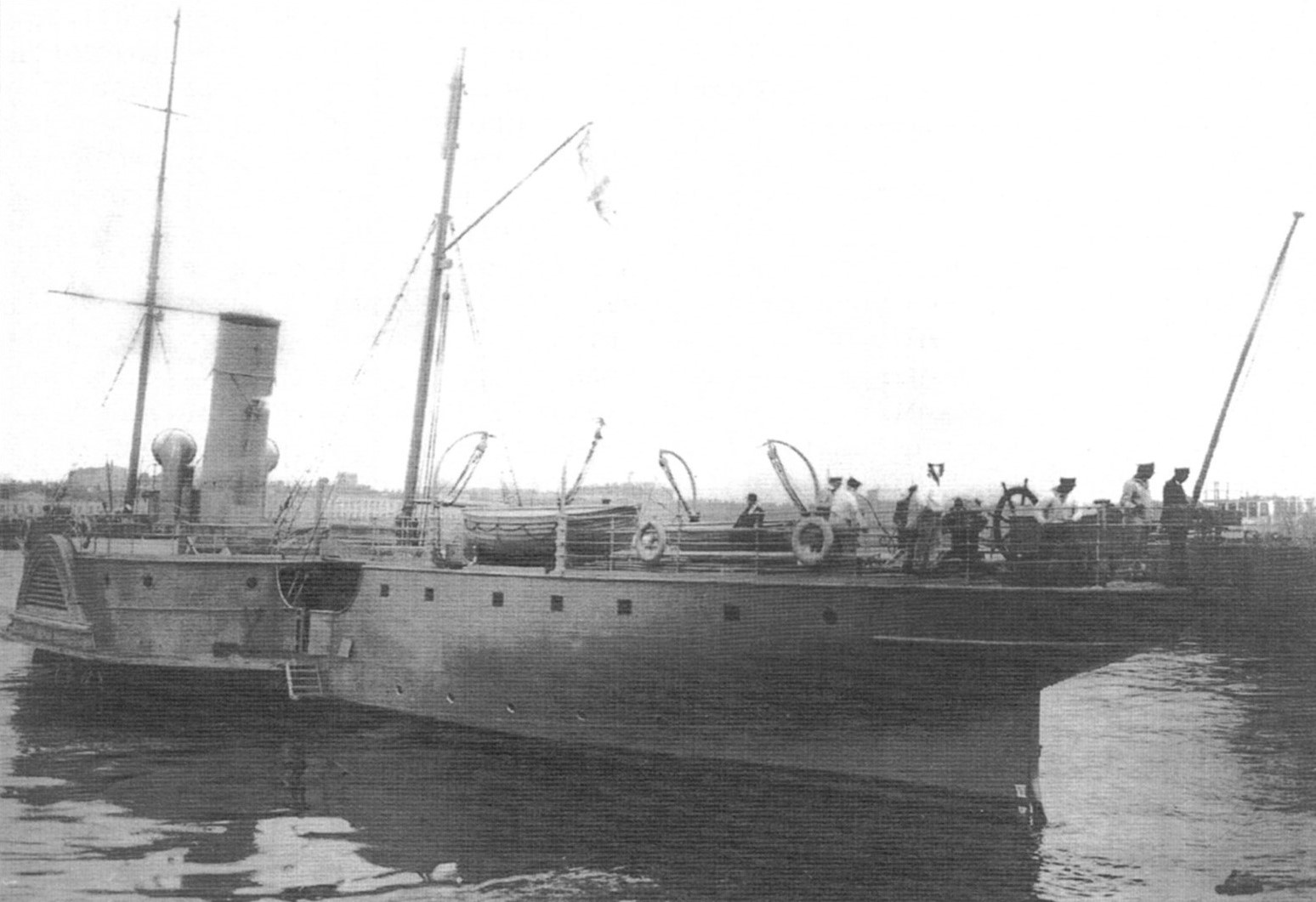
Apostol Piotr after being requisitioned for the Baltic Fleet

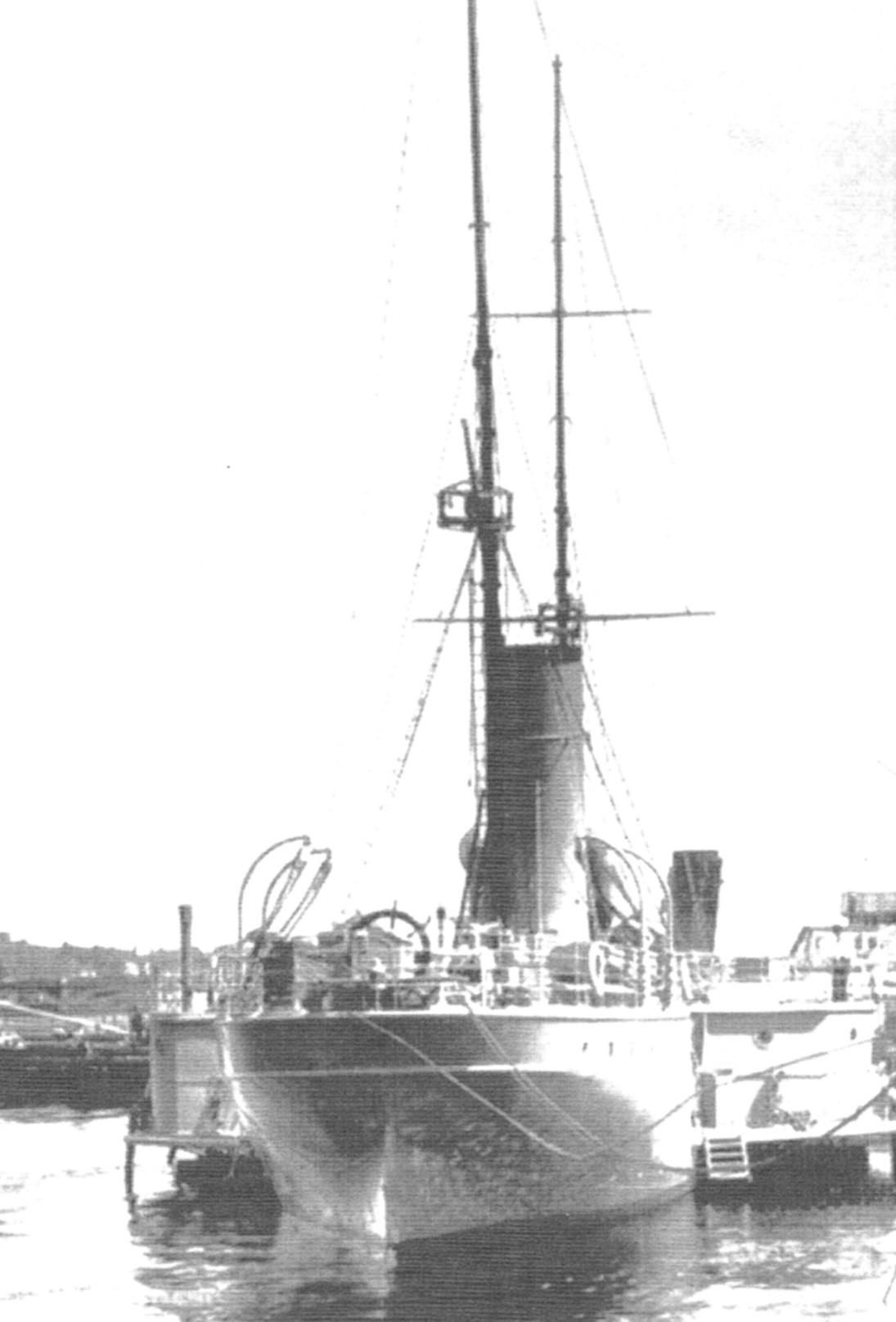
Minesweeper No. 18 in 1915

In the early months of World War I, a mine warfare campaign began in the Baltic Sea. As the number of minesweepers in the Baltic Fleet was insufficient, the admiralty decided to requisition civilian ships with shallow drafts for this purpose. Apostol Piotr was included on a list of recommended vessels compiled in February 1915 by Captain 2nd Rank Nikolai Tyrkov. A special commission led by N.N. Apostolov inspected the ship on May 5, and on May 12, (Note: Ehlers (2012, p. 54) gives the date as April 26.) the owners handed over the requisitioned vessel to the Imperial Russian Navy. Apostol Piotr was valued at 190,648 rubles. It was added to the fleet list on 3 June 1915. In the following months, it was converted into a minesweeper at the Admiralty Shipyards, and assigned the number 18. The ship was armed with a 47 mm Hotchkiss et Cie gun and a machine gun. The entire conversion cost 88,200 rubles. The ship's new crew consisted of 51 people, including 3 officers. Early in its naval service, stability issues were noted due to its shallow draft.

Initially, along with its sister minesweeper No. 19 (former Apostol Paviel), it served as a depot ship for minesweepers in Reval and from 1916 as minesweepers in the 4th Division of the Minesweeping Division. The ships were redeployed on 8 July 1917 to Rauma and on July 10 participated in their first combat mine-sweeping operation of a minefield laid a month earlier (June 7) by the submarine SM UC-58. Out of the 18 mines laid by the submarine, the minesweepers managed to find 9 submerged at a depth of 2 meters. Five were neutralized on July 10, three more the next day, and the last one on July 12. Of the mines recovered on the first day, three were destroyed by artillery fire, and the remaining six were salvaged. After three days of sweeping, the ships headed to Åbo for coal and sweeping gear supplies. Searches continued upon their return on July 16 but no further mines were found at the approach to the Rauma base. Both minesweepers underwent boiler cleaning in Helsingfors on July 21, and on July 27, searched for minefields between Odensholm and Neugrund with negative results.

In August, both minesweepers were grouped with the ships of the 3rd Division. Along with the minesweeper Zashchitnik, the ships set out on August 24 to the vicinity of Vormsi island, where they met with the 1st Division of minesweeper cutters. The entire group headed to Åbo for supplies; due to fuel shortages, the ships stayed in port for three days (from August 31 to September 3). From September 3 to 8, the group removed a minefield laid near Enskär. The twin ships joined the operation on September 4, but due to low temperatures, the other ships did not participate. Due to a storm, the operation was halted, with the ships docking in Åbo on September 5 and Uusikaupunki on September 6. The operation was completed in the remaining two days.

After completing the task, the group headed to the base in Lappvik, arriving on September 13. Number 18 was to move to the port of Rohuküla on October 14.

The winter of 1917/1918 was spent in Helsinki. After the October Revolution, both twin minesweepers came under Bolshevik control, who handed them over to the Finnish Socialist Workers' Republic on 15 March 1918 due to the ongoing Finnish Civil War. However, by 21 April 1918, the ships were taken over by the Germans, and in the third week of April, they were seized by the White Finns in Helsinki. They were deemed unsuitable for the navy by the war prize commission and were sold to a private owner on 24 August 1918. The first buyer, B. Cederholm, sold them a few weeks later to G. Westerlund, and they entered the fleet of AB Nya Warfet or West OY. The paddle steamers were measured on December 23, and in the spring of 1919, were registered in Helsinki as passenger ships; the former Apostol Piotr was renamed Peeter. However, they did not enter service and awaited a new buyer.

=== Estonian ship ===
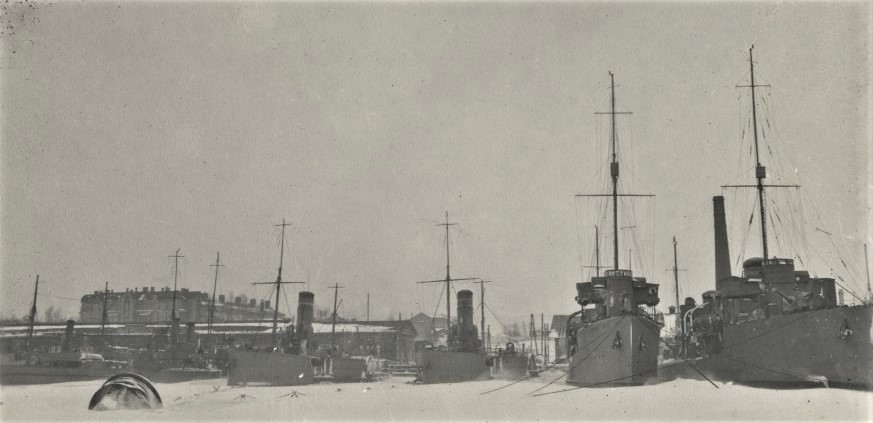
Minesweeper Suurop (fourth from the right) along with other Estonian vessels

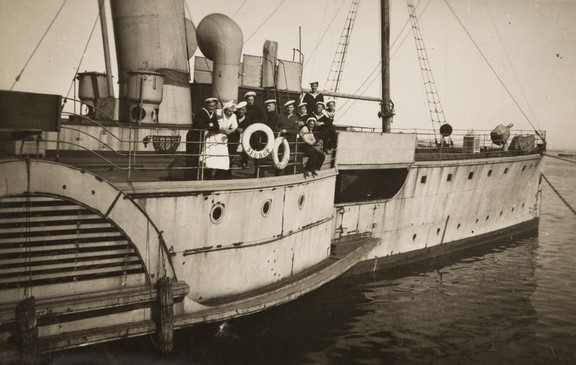
Suurop in the Tallinn naval mine harbor in 1937

After successfully concluding the war with the Bolsheviks, one of the primary goals of the Estonian naval forces was to clear the commercial shipping lanes of mines laid during recent conflicts, especially on the route from Tallinn to Osmussaar. This task was assigned to the Minesweeper Division (Estonian: Traalerite Divisjon), which, however, consisted of vessels suitable only for coastal operations. To enable operations on open waters, the Ministry of Foreign Affairs began searching for suitable minesweepers. The Estonians decided to purchase the ships Peeter and Pavel stationed in Helsinki. The purchase agreement was signed on 19 April 1920. Estonia paid 1 million Finnish marks in goods for both units, although they were valued at only a quarter of this amount. On May 13, Peeter received an Estonian crew and was listed in the Estonian Navy as Suurop. (Note: Ehlers (2012, p. 54) most likely mixes up the assignment of names to the two twin ships. According to him, no. 18 received the name Ristna and no. 19 the name Suurop. However, both Gajduk, Łapszyn & Sammalsoo (2010, p. 31), and Õun (2014, p. 58) present the opposite assignment. In this article, the version from these works has been adopted as more credible. It would be problematic to conduct a dual narrative from this point.) Both vessels (Pavel as Ristna) reached the capital Tallinn on May 18. In the capital port, the ships were re-equipped with minesweeping gear and underwent minor repairs. Both ships were used for minesweeping from June 27 to November 25.

After a year of service, the ships returned to civilian duty. This was related to transferring the task of mine clearance from the Ministry of War to the Ministry of Commerce and Industry. The proposal was made by the naval leadership in December 1920. The reason for the initiative was the previous transfer of auxiliary floating units to the civilian ministry, which now had to be borrowed to support minesweeping. The navy lacked funds for both this and for crew salaries during the winter. As a result, both Suurop and the other ships of the Minesweeper Division were transferred to the Ministry of Commerce and Industry on 15 January 1921. In 1921, Suurop participated in minesweeping operations, after which Estonian territorial waters were declared free of mines. Mine search continued in subsequent years only in coastal waters, which were suitable for shallow draft vessels.

Due to their unsuitability for further tasks, the twin vessels were transferred to the state carrier on 10 January 1922 to be used as passenger or cargo ships. Attempts with Ristna proved unprofitable, so Suurop did not begin transport operations. The ship lay idle in Tallinn port until 1926.

Mine blockades were an important part of the Estonian Republic's maritime defense concept. For their implementation, minelayers were needed. Due to the idleness of Suurop and Ristna, it was decided to convert these ships into minelayers. Modernization work was carried out in Tallinn port during the winter of 1926/1927. According to one source, the ships were transferred to the Ministry of War in 1925.

After the renovation, Suurop had a displacement of 600 tons, a length of 60.1 meters, and a width of 7.9 meters (15.35 meters including paddle wheels). The maximum draft was 1.8 meters at the bow and 2.35 meters at the stern. (Note: Ehlers (2012, p. 54) gives the figures: total length 60.5 meters, width 15.5 meters, and maximum draft of 2.2 meters.) The main structural changes were related to the function of laying and storing mines. Mines could be laid from a covered mine deck, with two chutes placed at the stern on both sides. Mine tracks were set on both the mine deck and the upper deck, with mines passing between decks via special chutes located in the central part of the ship. The vessel could carry a total of 175 contact mines of the 1908 model. The ship was armed with a QF 2-pounder naval gun taken from the scrapped Lembit. The ship could not only lay mines but also neutralize them. For this purpose, it was equipped with a Schulz sweep and a machine gun, which also served for anti-aircraft defense. Since Ristna did not receive a gun, (Note: Ehlers (2012, p. 54) states that the unit's armament after overhaul consisted of two guns: one of 76 mm caliber and the other of 40 mm caliber.) orders were placed for Bofors 40 mm guns for both ships, but the order in Sweden was not completed before the war. In this configuration, the ship's maximum speed was 12.5 knots.

The ship joined the Marine Division on 1 April 1927. The regular crew in the navy consisted of 39 people, including 4 officers. In wartime, the crew was to be expanded to 50 people. Suurop and Ristna participated in representational tasks, visiting neighboring Latvia and domestic ports. They primarily engaged in training exercises. Training included typical mine warfare actions such as laying and sweeping mines and conducting airdrops in collaboration with the Estonian Land Forces and the Estonian Defence League, as well as coastal artillery bombardment, where the ships towed shooting targets. Exercises took place in the West Estonian Archipelago (Kuivastu, Kassari), in the Tallinn area, and in Hara Bay. Particularly important exercises were held in the Kuivastu area in 1930 and 1931, involving both Estonian and Latvian forces.

In 1933, Estonia sold both its destroyers: Wambola and Lennuk, to Peru. The latter served as the flagship of the Maritime Division, and in autumn of that year, Suurop was adapted for the staff, with a special room set up.

The first significant action of the ship related to the outbreak of World War II was the search for the escaped interned Polish submarine ORP Orzeł. Ristna searched for the Polish submarine between the islands of Aegna, Naissaar, and Tallinn shallow from 18 to 19 September. On the second day, an unidentified submarine attacked the vessel with a torpedo. The crew of Suurop spotted the approaching torpedo in time, avoiding a hit. The military and civilian authorities decided to keep the incident quiet. After this event, the twin ships exchanged training mines for combat ones in the Paljassaare Harbour. Combat readiness was maintained on the ship until December 10.

The Estonian staff divided the Marine Division on 1 April 1940, so that the former Apostols were assigned to the new Mine-Sweeping Division (Estonian: Traaler-veeskjate divisjon). This division was relocated to the port of Loksa on May 10, then began naval exercises in Hara Bay. In breaks from maneuvers, the minesweepers removed mines laid by the Finns near Juminda during the war with the Soviet Union. While exercising in Hara Bay, the Soviet Navy's actions began on June 14, initiating a blockade of Estonian units. After about two weeks, the mine-laying ships began returning to Tallinn, traveling individually and escorted by Soviet ships, eventually docking at the Old City Harbour. The only activity of the units in July was the evacuation of soldiers from bases on Aegna and Naissaar islands at the beginning of the month.

=== Soviet ship ===
Active preparations to integrate the ship into the Soviet Baltic Fleet began in July 1940. At that time, a political officer was assigned to the vessel, and the crew was obliged to participate in various communist propaganda activities. Ristna was incorporated into the Soviet Navy based on the order from the People's Commissar of the Navy dated 18 (Note: Ehlers (2012, p. 54) provides the date as August 13.) August 1940, numbered 00208, retaining its Estonian name. The formal handover of the ship occurred only on October 30. Suurop was listed in the fleet inventory as part of the Water Area Protection Group of the Main Base of the Red Baltic Fleet, functioning as a minelayer.

During the winter of 1940/1941, the ships stayed in the port of Tallinn, where they provided heat to other Soviet Navy vessels. In the spring, they performed guard duties at the port's roadstead. After the commencement of the German invasion of the Soviet Union, the fleet's command decided to dispense with the Estonian crew members, despite the previous political work. They were demobilized in early July, replaced by sailors from Kronstadt and other minelayers of the Baltic Fleet. The commander of Suurop became Lieutenant Georg Lung, from an Estonian-Russian family.

In July, the ship laid mines in the waters of the Gulf of Finland and the Gulf of Riga. By August 11, it had laid a total of 520 mines. On that day, it was supposed to lay mine barriers in the Irbe Strait, but it did not complete this task. Passing through the Suur Strait near Virtsu, it struck a German bottom mine, most likely dropped from an aircraft. The explosion did not cause the detonation of any of the 96 mines on board but resulted in the death of 16 crew members, (Note: Õun (2014, p. 59) states that there were about 15 victims.) including the captain. The ship's stern rested on the bottom, while the bow remained above water. This allowed the removal of the gun from the wreck, which was incorporated into the anti-aircraft defense system of Saaremaa Island. Later, the remnants of the ship were either blown up or sank on their own. The steel remains of the ship rest at the sinking site. In 2009, the crew of the Estonian minehunter Ugandi detonated 3 mines from Suurop's equipment, after which a warning was issued about remaining explosives.

== Bibliography ==
- Ehlers, Hartmut (2012). "Marynarka Wojenna i Paramilitarne Siły Morskie Estonii 1918-1940". Okręty Wojenne (in Polish). 111. Tarnowskie Góry. ISSN 1231-014X.
- Gajduk, A. A.; Łapszyn, R.; Sammalsoo, P. (2010). "Dorogi wojny bywszych «Apostołow»". Gangut (in Russian). 56.
- Õun, M. (2014). Eesti Merejõudude laevu 1918–40 (in Estonian). Tallinn: Sentinel.
