= Poolamets =

Poolamets is a surname. Notable people with the surname include:

- Anti Poolamets (born 1971), Estonian historian, lawyer and politician
- Evelin Poolamets (born 1974), Estonian politician
