= Hara, Harju County =

Village in Estonia

Coordinates: 59°34′14″N 25°37′51″E

Hara
- Village
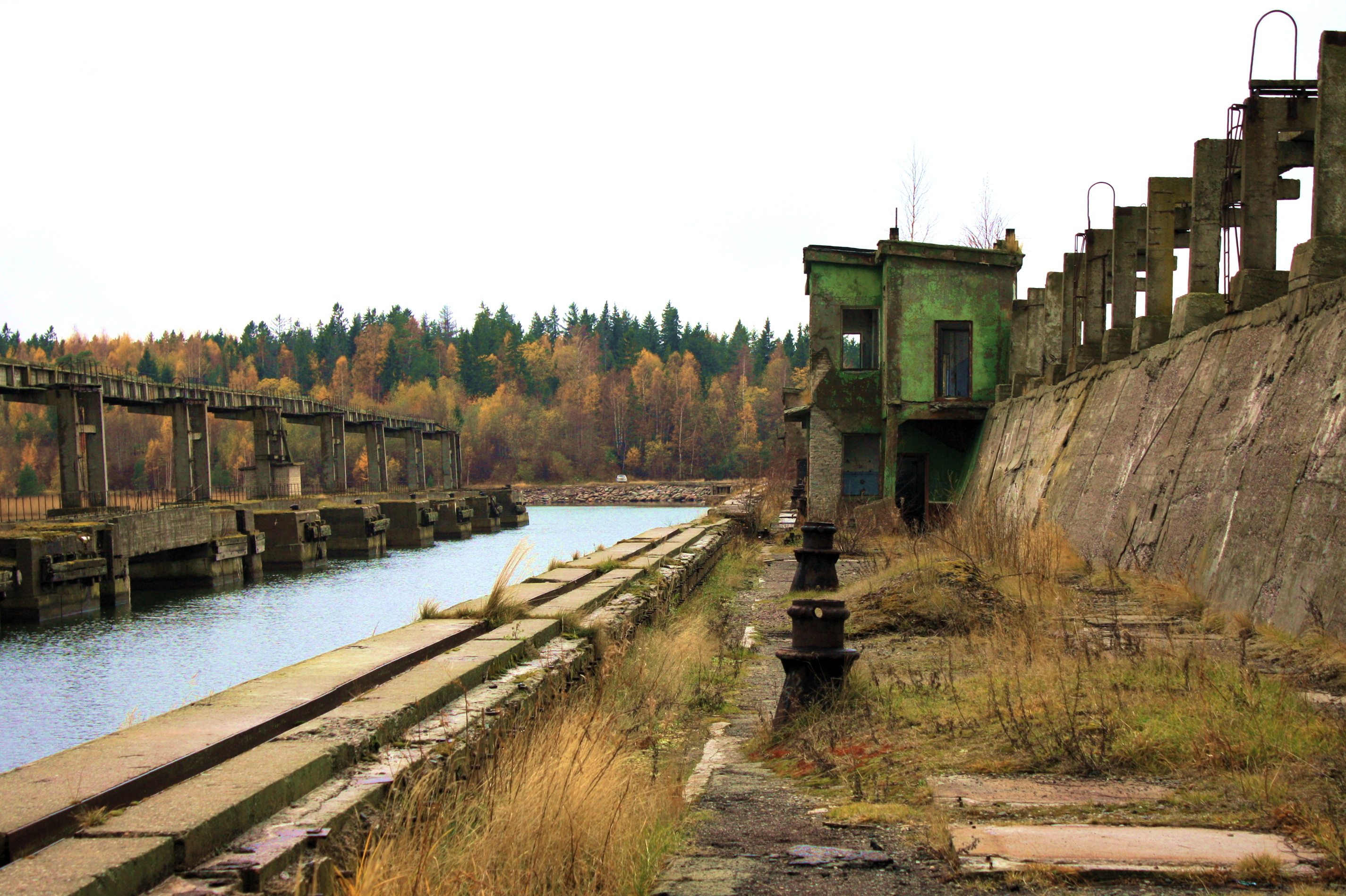
- Former Soviet submarine degaussing station in Hara.
- Interactive map of Hara
- Country: Estonia
- County: Harju County
- Parish: Kuusalu Parish
- Time zone: UTC+2 (EET)
  - Summer (DST): UTC+3 (EEST)

Hara is a village in Kuusalu Parish, Harju County in northern Estonia, on the territory of Lahemaa National Park. It is located on the Juminda Peninsula, on the shore of Hara Bay.

A former Soviet submarine station is located in Hara.
