= Loksa (disambiguation) =

Loksa may refer to several places in Estonia:

- Loksa, town in Harju County
- Loksa, Kuusalu Parish, village in Kuusalu Parish, Harju County
- Loksa, Lääne-Viru County, village in Tapa Parish, Lääne-Viru County

== See also ==
- Lokša
