= Tapurla =

Village in Estonia

Coordinates: 59°36′N 25°34′E

- Village
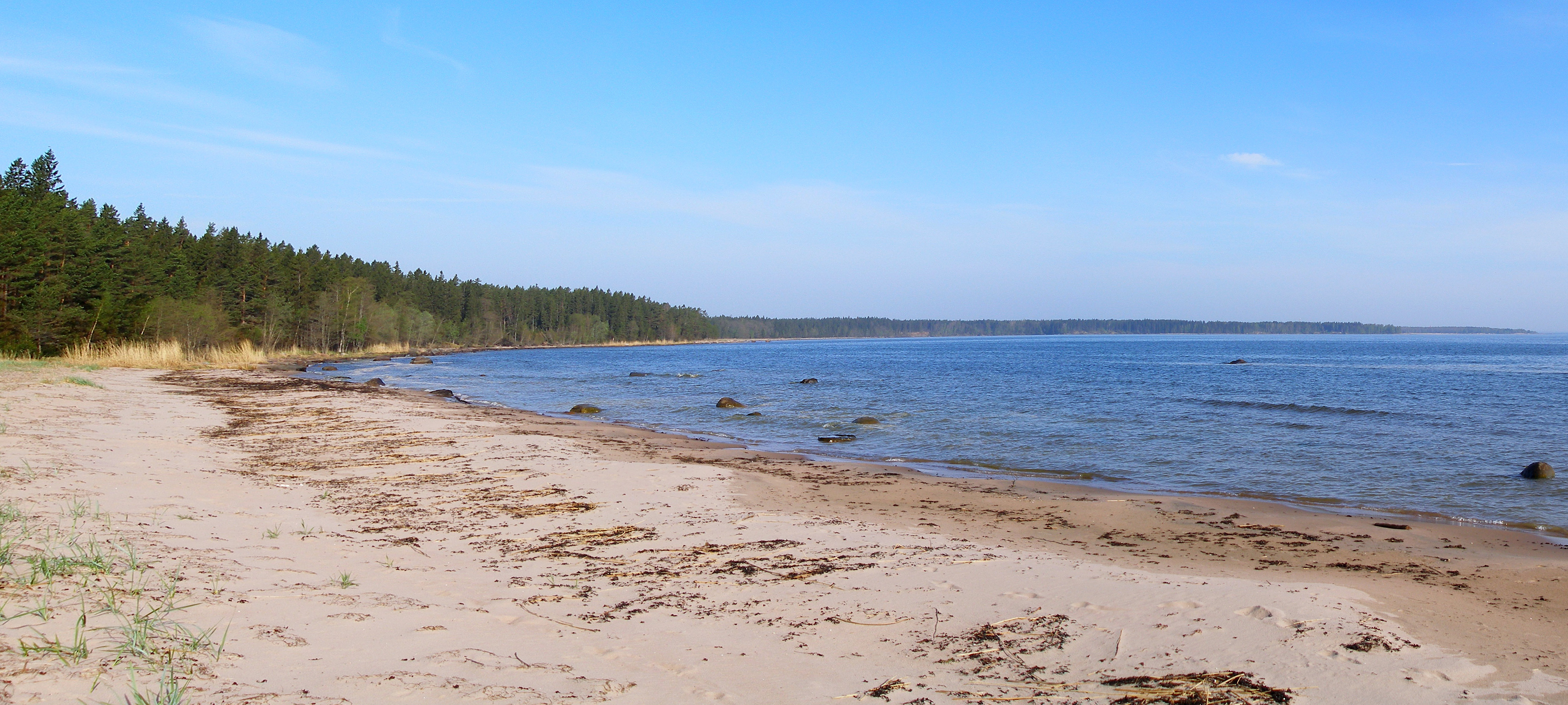
- Naskali bay, Gulf of Finland, Lahemaa National Park, Estonia
- Interactive map of Tapurla
- Country: Estonia
- County: Harju County
- Parish: Kuusalu Parish
- Time zone: UTC+2 (EET)
  - Summer (DST): UTC+3 (EEST)

Tapurla is a village in Kuusalu Parish, Harju County in northern Estonia, on the territory of Lahemaa National Park. It is located on the Juminda Peninsula.
