= Vanaküla, Harju County =

Village in Estonia

Coordinates: 59°29′19″N 25°47′20″E

Vanaküla
- Village
- Interactive map of Vanaküla
- Country: Estonia
- County: Harju County
- Parish: Kuusalu Parish
- Time zone: UTC+2 (EET)
  - Summer (DST): UTC+3 (EEST)

Vanaküla is a village in Kuusalu Parish, Harju County in northern Estonia. It lies on the left bank of the Valgejõgi River.

== Name ==
Vanaküla was attested in written sources as part of the personal name Wanaküla Jack in 1630–1631 and Wannaküll Jaack in 1637, referring to the freeholder son of Kolga Manor, and as Wannakül (küla) in 1683 and WanaKÿla in 1699. The name literally means 'old village'. The motivation for the name is unclear. According to Gustav Vilbaste, Vanaküla was settled in the first half of the 17th century on land that belonged to the village of Valgejõe, which was destroyed in the wars of the 16th century (and then rebuilt in its current location about 3 kilometers (1.9 mi) to the south). According to Enn Tarvel, the site was known as Witena in 1290, which semantically corresponds to the name Valgejõe (both meaning 'white river'). If this is the case, the name Vanaküla refers to its location at the old site of the village of Valgejõe.
