= Nõmmeveski =

Village in Estonia

Coordinates: 59°30′27″N 25°47′37″E

- Village
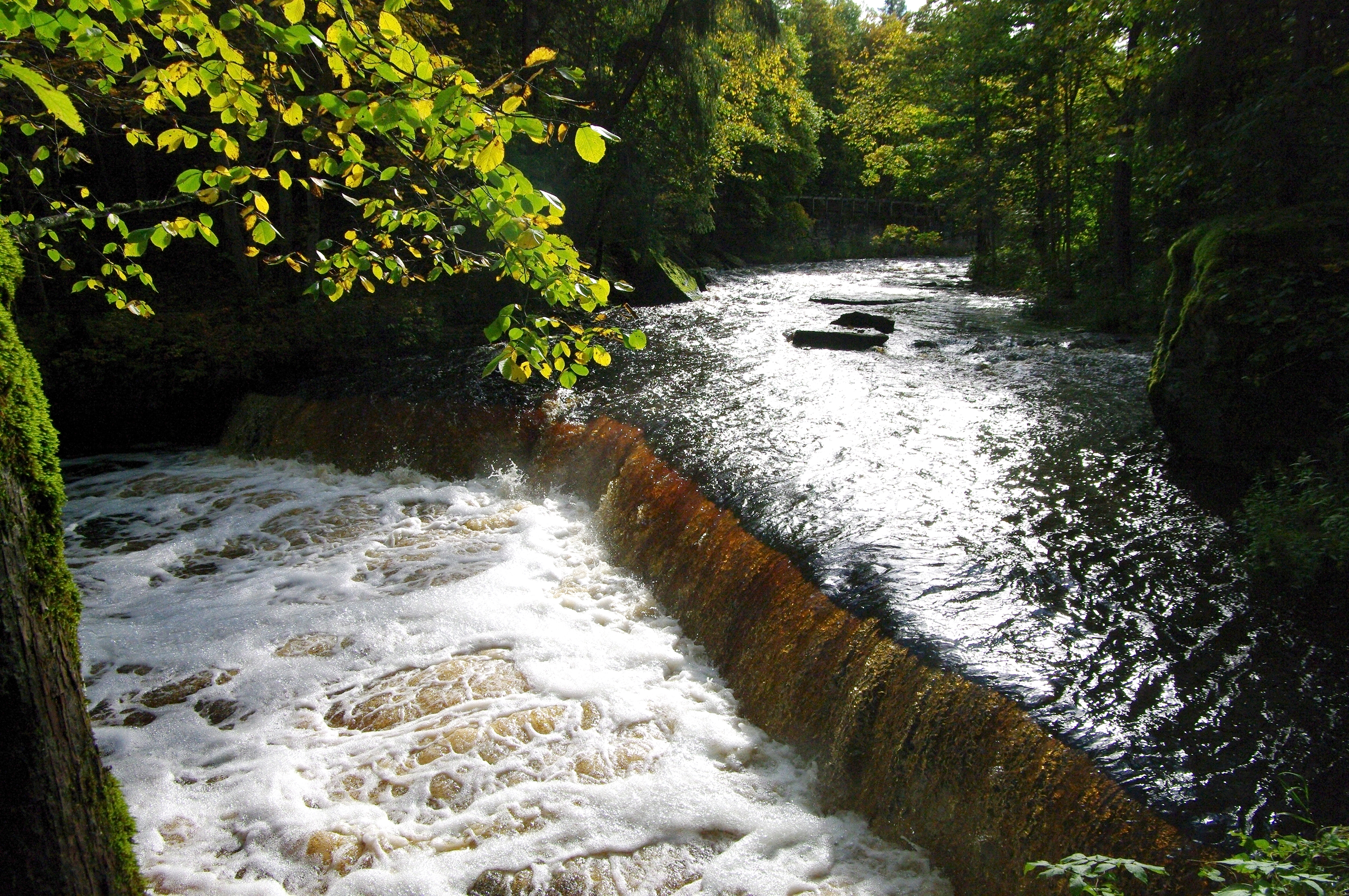
- Nõmmeveski Falls on the Valgejõgi River
- Interactive map of Nõmmeveski
- Country: Estonia
- County: Harju County
- Parish: Kuusalu Parish
- Time zone: UTC+2 (EET)
  - Summer (DST): UTC+3 (EEST)

Nõmmeveski is a village in Kuusalu Parish, Harju County in northern Estonia, in Lahemaa National Park. It lies on the Valgejõgi River, where there is a 1.2 m (4 ft) waterfall.

== Name ==
The name Nõmmeveski means 'heath mill' (< nõmm 'heath, moor' + veski 'mill'). The site of the mill was originally called Vanaveski (literally, 'old mill') and was attested in written sources as quarn Wanna Weskil in the 17th century, when it was part of the neighboring village of Vanaküla. In 1712, Wanna Külla Möll is mentioned among the scattered farms belonging to Kõnnu, and Enn Tarvel identified this name with Nõmmeveski. The settlement name is attested in 1739 as part of the personal name Nöm̄e Weski Mick, and in 1796 Ludwig August Mellin designated two mills under the name Nömme.
