= Loksa, Kuusalu Parish =

Village in Estonia

Coordinates: 59°34′09″N 25°43′52″E

Loksa
- Village
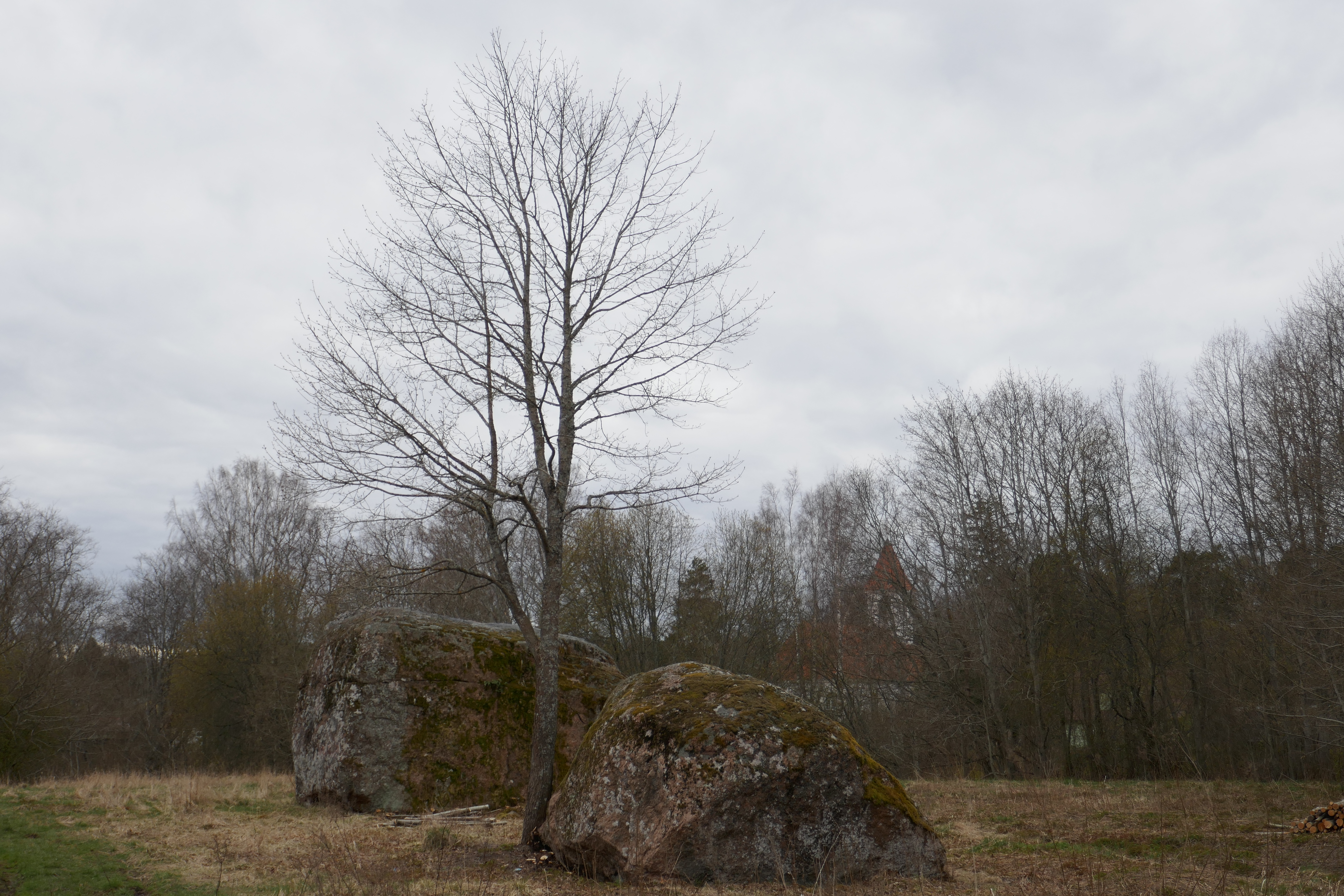
- Mardimiku boulders with Loksa church in the background
- Interactive map of Loksa
- Country: Estonia
- County: Harju County
- Parish: Kuusalu Parish
- Time zone: UTC+2 (EET)
  - Summer (DST): UTC+3 (EEST)

Loksa is a village in Kuusalu Parish, Harju County in northern Estonia. It lies on the Valgejõgi River, just south of the town of Loksa.
