= Evelin Poolamets =

Estonian politician

Evelin Poolamets (born 21 February 1974) is an Estonian politician. In 2023, she was elected as a member of XV Riigikogu, representing the Conservative People's Party of Estonia. Her husband is politician Anti Poolamets.
