= Kotka, Harju County =

Village in Estonia

Coordinates: 59°33′N 25°44′E

Kotka
- Village
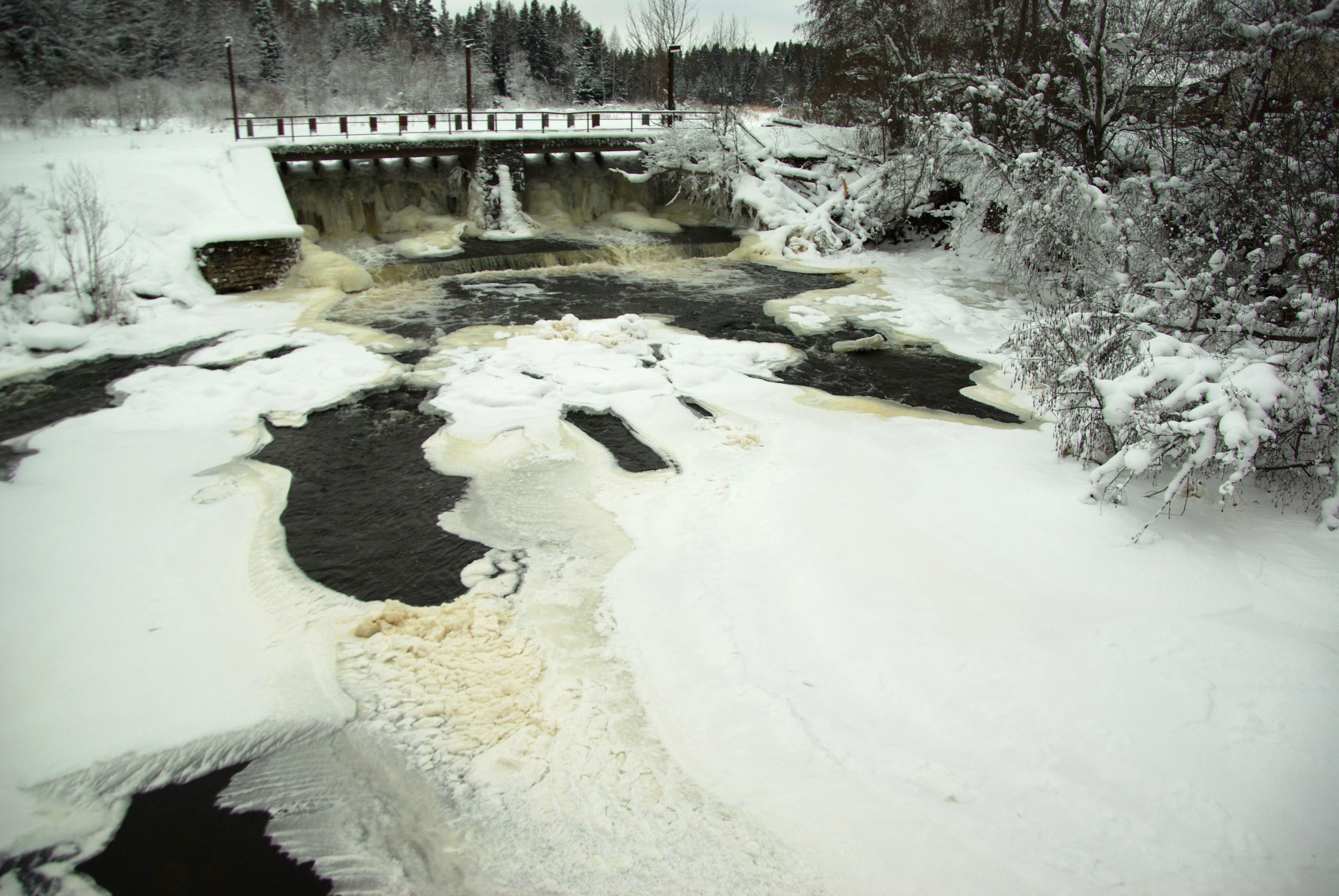
- Interactive map of Kotka
- Country: Estonia
- County: Harju County
- Parish: Kuusalu Parish
- Time zone: UTC+2 (EET)
  - Summer (DST): UTC+3 (EEST)

Kotka is a village in Kuusalu Parish, Harju County in northern Estonia. It lies on the Valgejõgi River, about 3.5 km (2 mi) south of the town of Loksa.
