= Kotka Piran =

- Location within Pakistan
- Coordinates: 32.58°N 70.34°E
- Country: Pakistan
- Province: Khyber-Pakhtunkhwa
- Elevation: 364 m (1,194 ft)
- Time zone: UTC+5 (PST)

Kotka Piran is a village in Khyber-Pakhtunkhwa province of Pakistan. It is located at 32°58'42N 70°34'53E with an altitude of 364 metres (1197 feet).
