= Siret Kotka =

Estonian politician

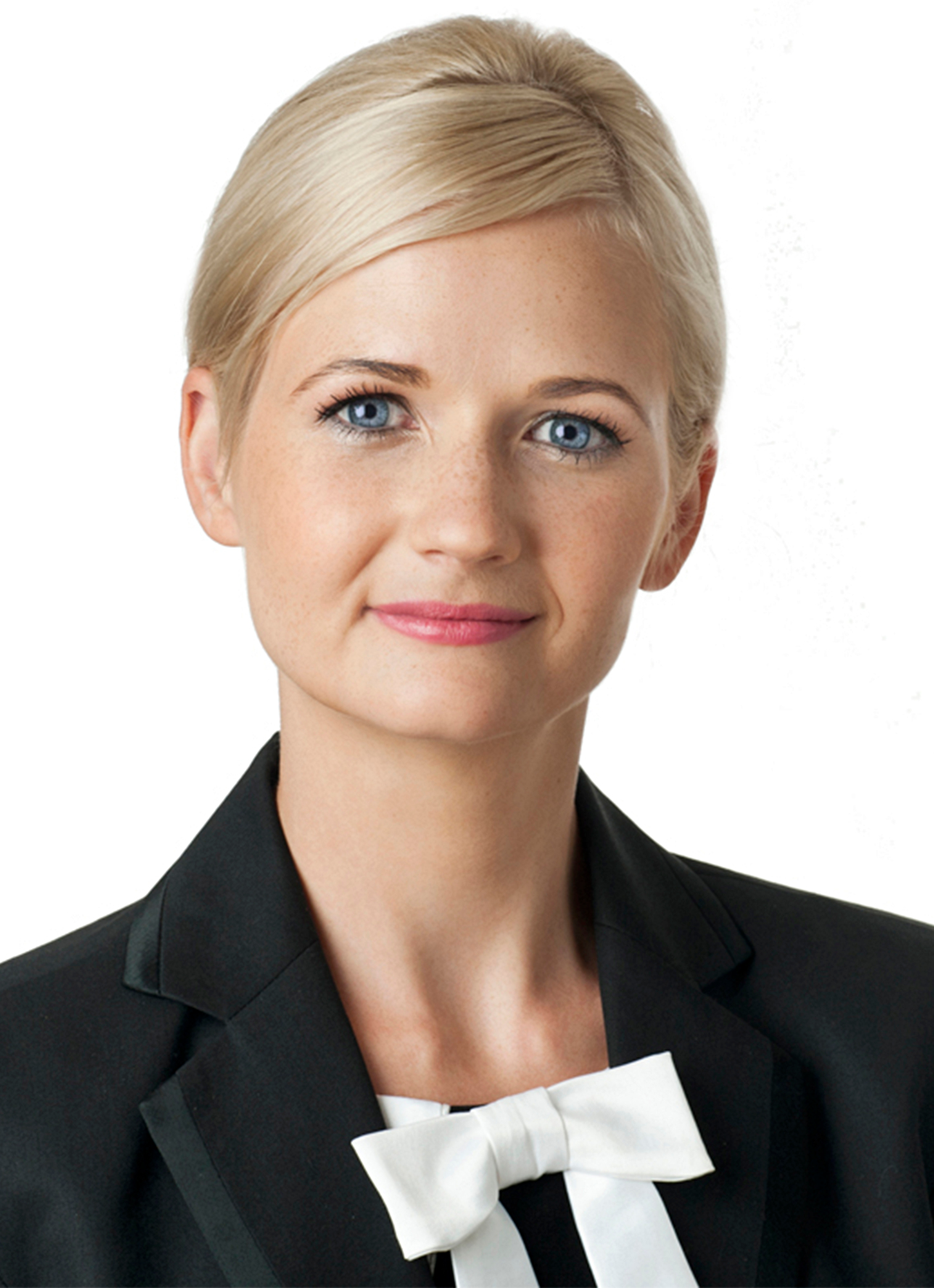
Kotka in 2013

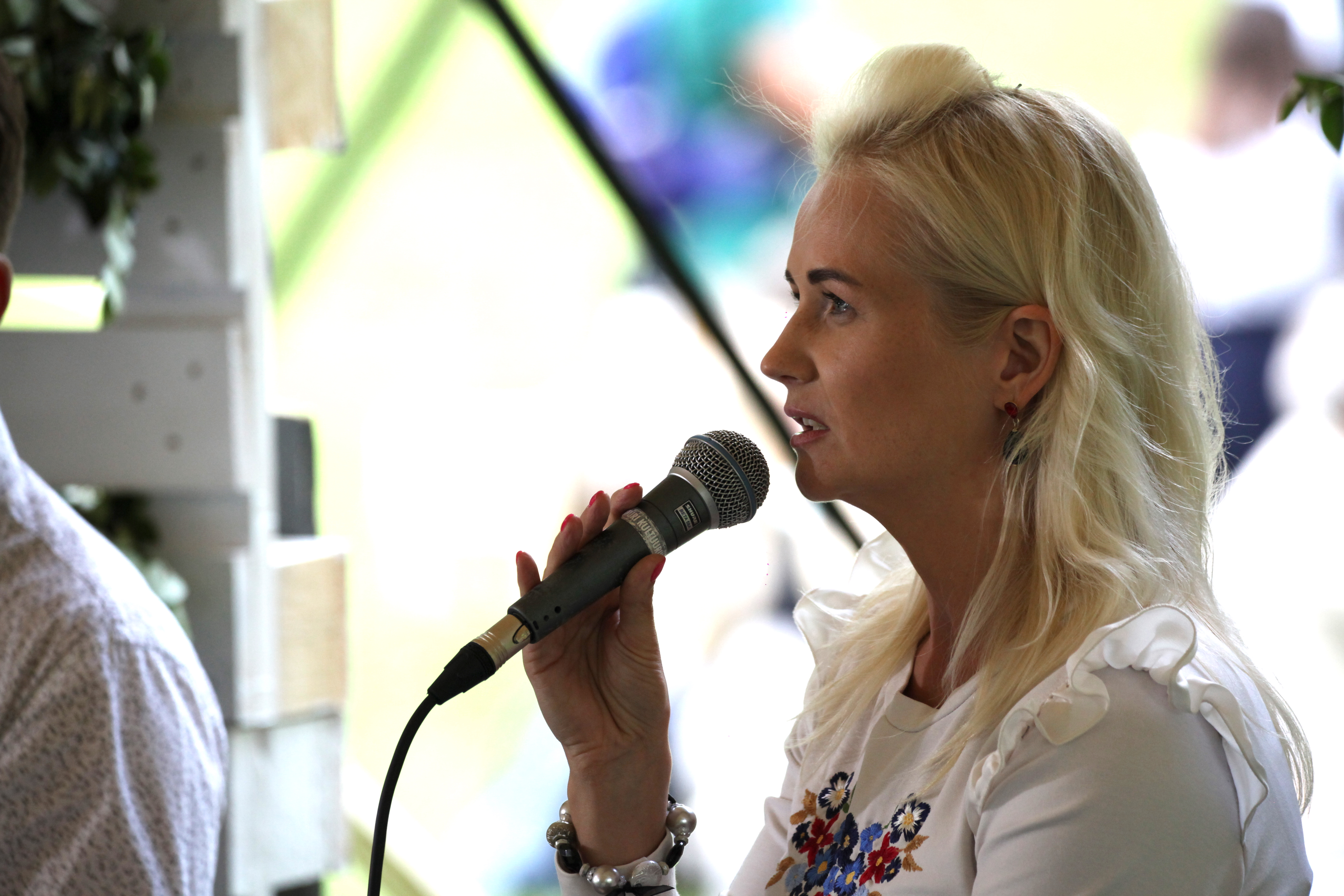
Kotka at the Opinion Festival 2021 in Paide, Estonia

Siret Kotka (Note: Siret Kotka-Repinski while married) (born 27 July 1986) is an Estonian politician and a member of the Riigikogu. Born in Viljandi, she represents the Lääne-Virumaa constituency as a member of the Estonian Centre Party.

On September 7, 2013 Kotka was elected to the party's board and later worked as an adviser to Tallinn Deputy Mayor Taavi Aas. In 2014 she was chosen to Riigikogu to replace the convicted Ester Tuiksoo. Kotka was elected back to the Riigikogu in the 2015 election with 2,558 personal votes.
