= Anti Poolamets =

Estonian politician

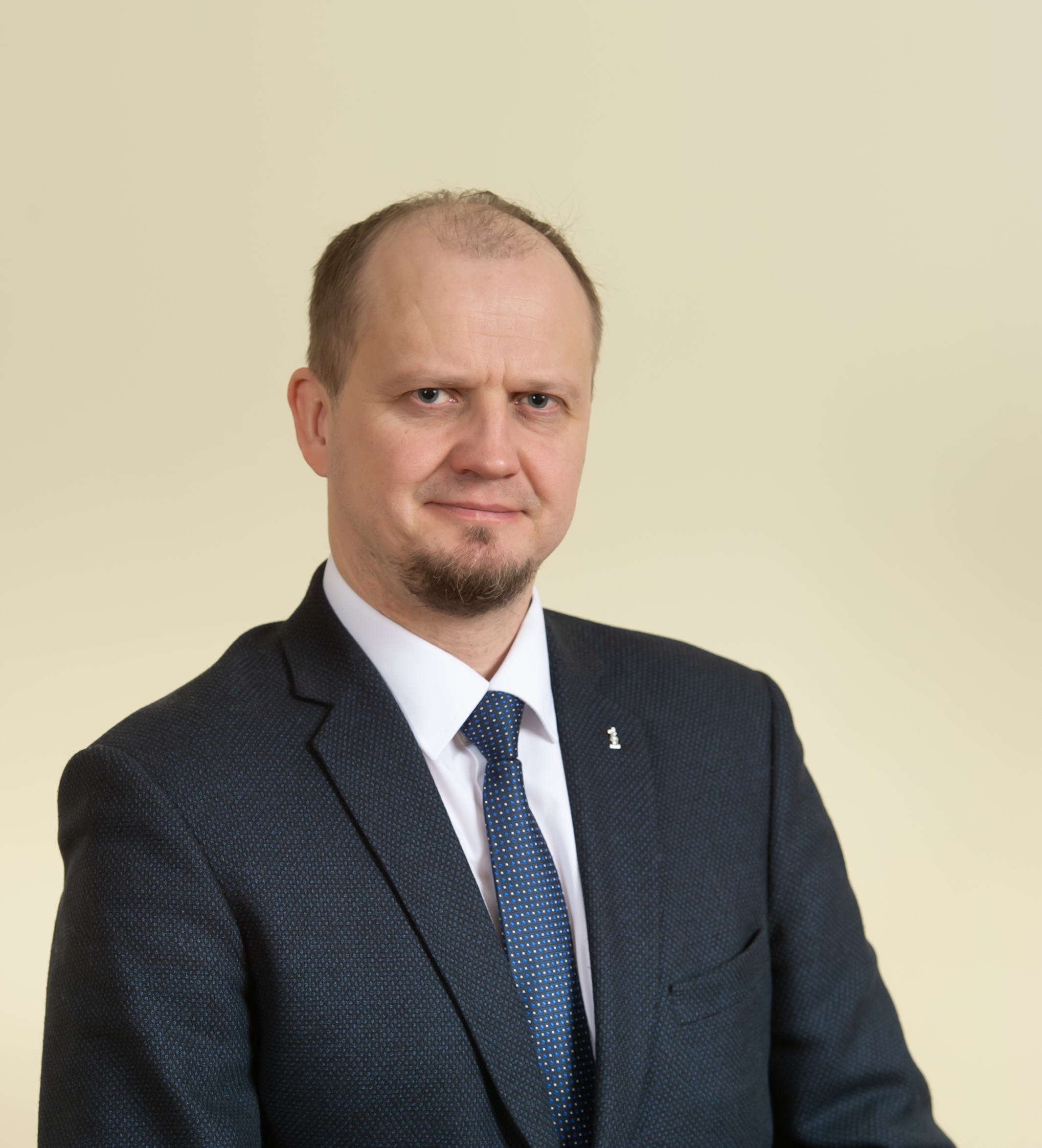
- Poolamets in 2019

Member of XIV Riigikogu

Member of XV Riigikogu

Personal details
- Born: February 22, 1971 (age 55) Tallinn, then part of Estonian SSR, Soviet Union
- Party: Conservative People's Party of Estonia
- Spouse: Evelin Poolamets
- Education: University of Tartu
- Occupation: Politician, historian, lawyer

Anti Poolamets (born 22 February 1971) is an Estonian historian, lawyer and politician. He has been a member of the XIV Riigikogu.

Poolamets was born in Tallinn. In 2000 he graduated from the University of Tartu with a degree in law, and in 2010 with a degree in history. From 2001 to 2014 he was a lecturer at the Estonian Academy of Security Sciences.

Since 2014 he has been a member of the Estonian Conservative People's Party.

He ran for the Riigikogu in the 2023 elections and received 2,831 votes in the electoral district number 6 (Lääne-Viru), securing his election as a member of the Riigikogu. His wife, Evelin Poolamets was also elected to the Riigikogu in 2023.
