= Enskär =

Island in the country of Sweden

Coordinates: 65.661°N 23.981°E

Enskär (Finnish: Enskeri) is a Swedish island belonging to the Haparanda archipelago. The island is located approximately 19 kilometres south of the town of Haparanda. The island has no shore connection. Enskär is part of Natura 2000. Enskär is curled around a bay, where the overnight houses are located.
