= Loksa =

Town in Harju County, Estonia

- Town
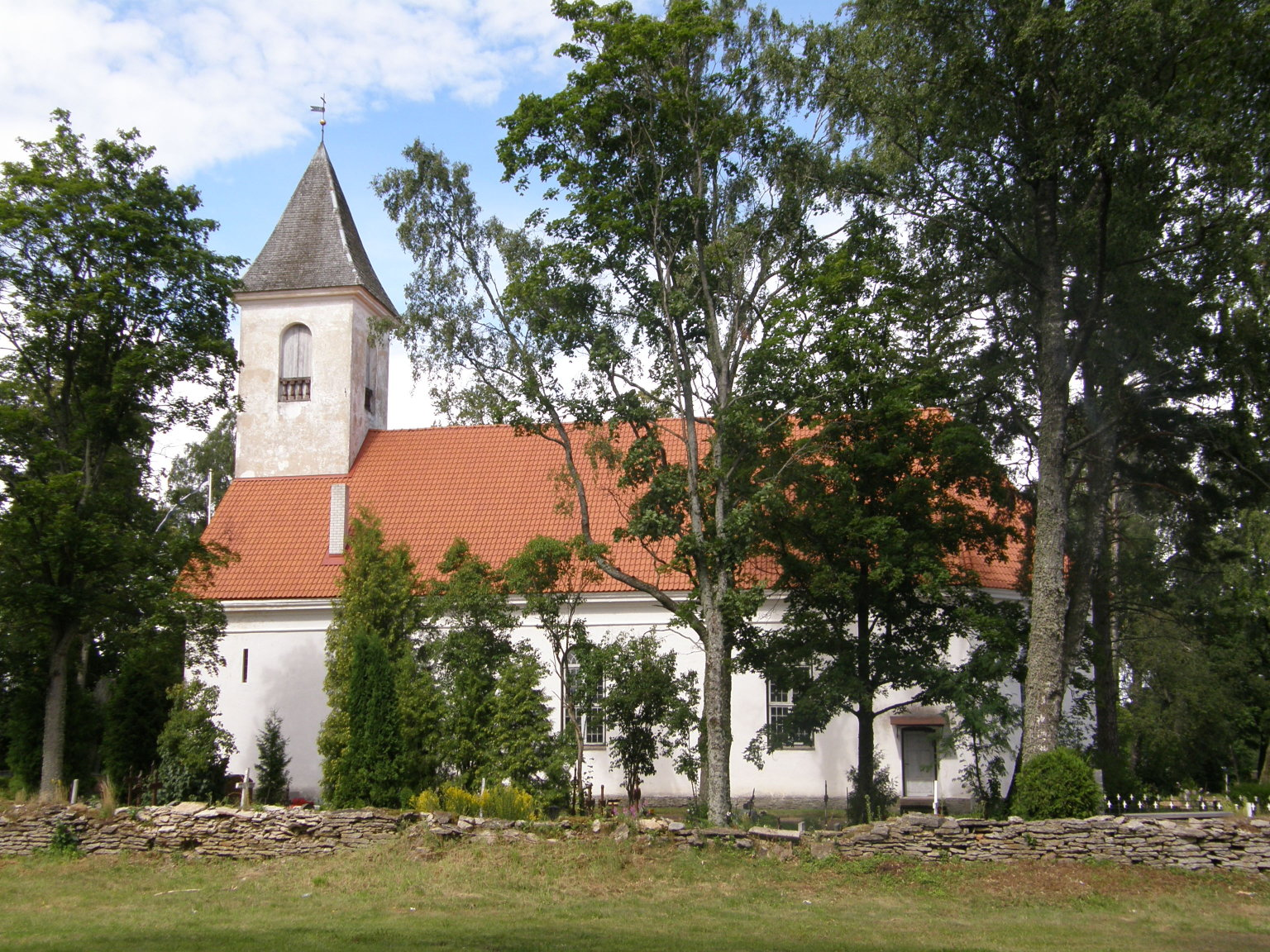
- Church of Saint Mary the Virgin in Loksa

- Flag Coat of arms

- Location in Estonia
- Coordinates: 59°35′03″N 25°42′49″E
- Country: Estonia
- County: Harju County
- First historical record: 1629
- First mentioned: 1631
- Borough rights: 1948
- Town rights: 1993

Government
  - Mayor: Värner Lootsmann (Centre Party)

Area
  - Total: 3.81 km^{2} (1.47 sq mi)

Population (2026)
  - Total: 2,459▼
  - Rank: 33rd
  - Density: 645/km^{2} (1,670/sq mi)

Ethnicity (2011)
  - Estonians: 30.6%
  - Russians: 58.6%
  - Other: 10.8%
- Postal codes: 74801, 74805, 74806, 74807, 74816
- ISO 3166 code: EE-424
- Website: www.loksa.ee

Drone video of Loksa in July 2022

Loksa is a town and municipality in Harju County, Estonia, best known for its shipping industry. Loksa is the northernmost town in Estonia.

The town is on the estuary of the Valgejõgi River, which drains into Hara Bay, Gulf of Finland.

As of January 1st 2026, the town had a population of 2,459.

== Etymology ==
The village of Loksa, the town's namesake and predecessor, was first mentioned in 1631 as Lox. Later on, the village was also referred to as Locksa and Loxa, until it became known as Loksa in 1798.

The name possibly comes from the word loks (local dialect), which means either a marsh or a lake that dries up during the dry season.

== History ==
The village of Loksa was first mentioned in 1687 but this area is known in modern times as the village of Kotka.

The development of what is known these days as the town of Loksa started around 1874 when the landlords of Kolga established a new brickyard outside Loksa. Around this factory a new market town was born.

In 1903, a shipyard was established, boosting the community's further growth. From Loksa, bricks were transported to Reval (Tallinn), Helsingfors (Helsinki) and Saint Petersburg. Although no ships were built in Loksa, the shipyard was heavily engaged in repairing ships from 1905 onwards.

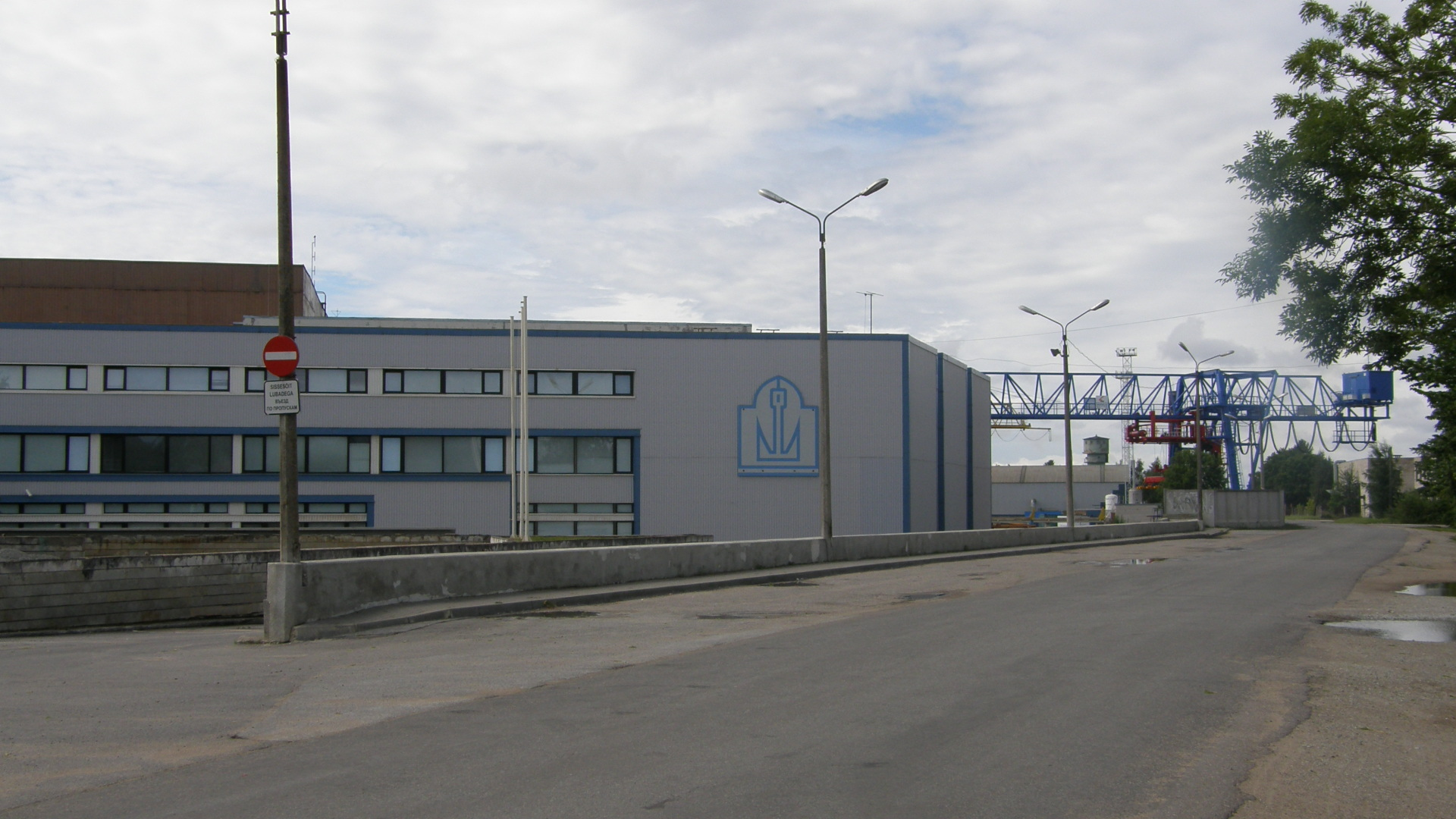
Loksa shipyard

By the end of the 19th century, there were 36 dwellings in Loksa. By 1934, their number had grown to 150. Loksa soon became the administrative centre of Loksa Parish which was part of Harju County until 1949 and of Viru County from 1949 to 1950.

From 1950 to 1957, Loksa was the administrative centre of Loksa District. After a new administrative reform in 1957 Loksa became part of Harju District. The brickyard was closed down in 1981, but the shipyard continued to be expanded until the end of the Soviet occupation and remains the town's main employer.

With the restoration of the Republic of Estonia in 1991, Loksa again became the seat of the restored Loksa Parish, and it was elevated from market town to town on August 25, 1993. A military drill in 2010 made the beach near Loksa the site of the first American amphibious landing exercise in what had been Soviet territory.

== Demographics ==
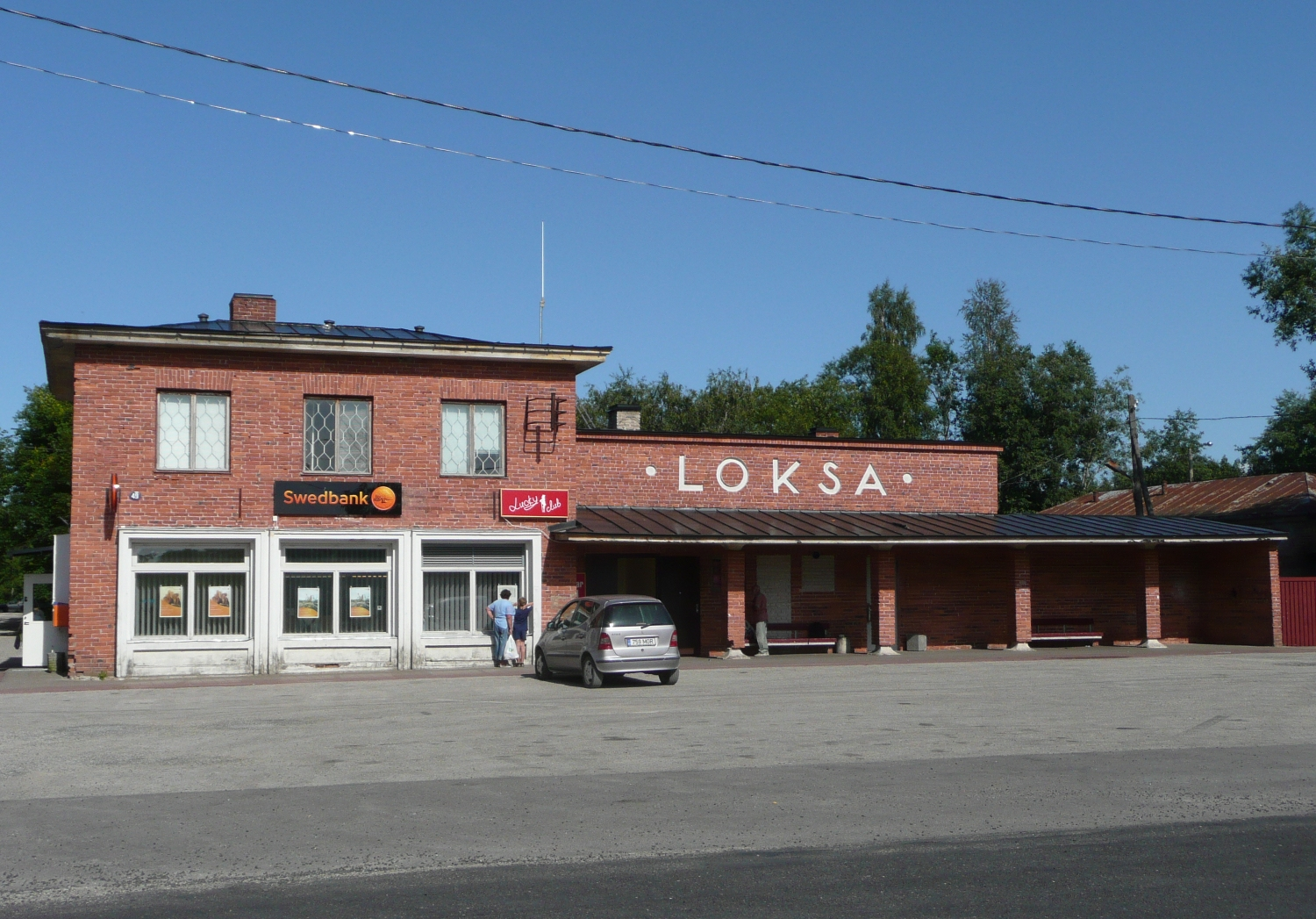
Loksa bus station

Since the beginning of the 1990s, the population of Loksa has decreased by more than one fifth. This has been mainly caused by growing unemployment, resulting from closure and downsizing of several companies not fit for new economic climate.

In 2000, there were 1,650 inhabitants in labor force, 750 of whom were working somewhere else.

As of 2011, Estonians made up 30.6% of the towns population and Russians 58.6%.

Year	Estimated population on January 1
1989	4311
1990	4325
2001	3500
2002	3503
2003	3487
2004	3482
2005	3474
2006	3469
2007	3454
2008	3437
2009	3405
2019	2576

Ethnic Composition 1922–2021
Ethnicity	1922		1934		1959		1970		1979		1989		2000		2011		2021	
Ethnicity	amount	%	amount	%	amount	%	amount	%	amount	%	amount	%	amount	%	amount	%	amount	%
Estonians	234	84.8	501	93.3	1494	45.1	1390	44.5	1301	37.0	1155	26.8	1143	32.7	845	30.6	840	32.1
Russians	24	8.70	17	3.17	-	-	1451	46.5	1855	52.8	2519	58.4	1928	55.2	1618	58.6	1377	52.7
Ukrainians	-	-	-	-	-	-	83	2.66	147	4.18	308	7.14	-	-	156	5.65	225	8.60
Belarusians	-	-	-	-	-	-	98	3.14	87	2.48	120	2.78	-	-	40	1.45	46	1.76
Finns	-	-	-	-	-	-	38	1.22	28	0.80	26	0.60	-	-	11	0.40	8	0.31
Jews	0	0.00	-	-	-	-	1	0.03	1	0.03	2	0.05	-	-	0	0.00	0	0.00
Latvians	-	-	0	0.00	-	-	4	0.13	7	0.20	12	0.28	-	-	7	0.25	18	0.69
Germans	10	3.62	9	1.68	-	-	-	-	34	0.97	35	0.81	-	-	8	0.29	10	0.38
Tatars	-	-	-	-	-	-	-	-	17	0.48	32	0.74	-	-	10	0.36	8	0.31
Poles	-	-	-	-	-	-	-	-	8	0.23	19	0.44	-	-	9	0.33	8	0.31
Lithuanians	-	-	-	-	-	-	5	0.16	3	0.09	5	0.12	-	-	10	0.36	11	0.42
unknown	0	0.00	2	0.37	0	0.00	0	0.00	0	0.00	0	0.00	9	0.26	7	0.25	12	0.46
other	8	2.90	8	1.49	1822	54.9	53	1.70	26	0.74	82	1.90	414	11.8	38	1.38	52	1.99
Total	276	100	537	100	3316	100	3123	100	3514	100	4315	100	3494	100	2759	100	2615	100

=== Religion ===
Religion in Loksa Parish (2021)
1. Unaffiliated (61.4%)
2. Orthodox (29.2%)
3. Lutheran (3.80%)
4. Others Christians (1.20%)
5. Others Religions or Unknown (4.40%)
6. 0.00%

== Education ==
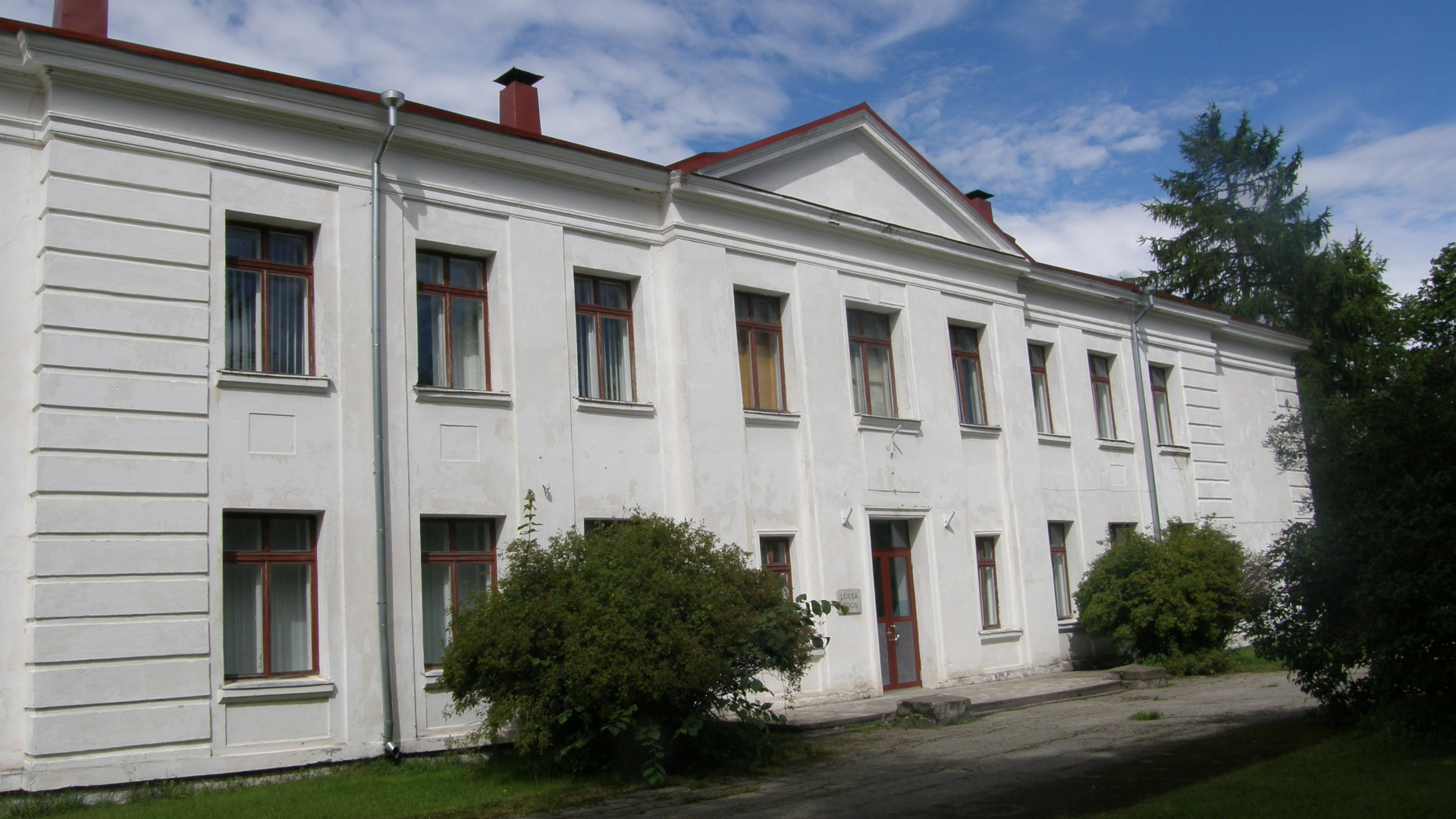
Loksa High School

The history of education in Loksa dates back to December 1867, when the teacher Jakob Janter started to teach 20 children in a local farmhouse. The first schoolhouse was built in 1903, but this building burned down in 1927. Restoration work took two years and was completed in 1929.

With the influx of Russian workers in the late 1940s, three classes for Russian-speaking children were created in 1948. Loksa Primary School was upgraded to a secondary school in 1952 and renamed Loksa High School No. 1 (Estonian: Loksa 1. Keskkool; now called Loksa High School, Estonian: Loksa Gümnaasium). Until 1988, children studied in both Russian and Estonian in the same school.

At the end of the 1980s, both the Russian- and Estonian-speaking communities had grown large enough to justify creation of a second school. Loksa High School No. 2 (Estonian: Loksa 2. Keskkool) for Russian-speaking children was established in 1988 and is still operational, since 1996 under the name Loksa Russian High School (Estonian: Loksa Vene Gümnaasium).
