= Juminda Peninsula =

Peninsula in Estonia

Coordinates: 59.596°N 25.541°E

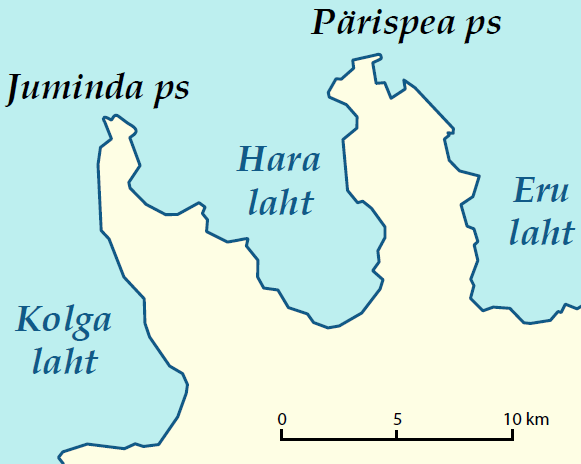
Location of the Juminda Peninsula

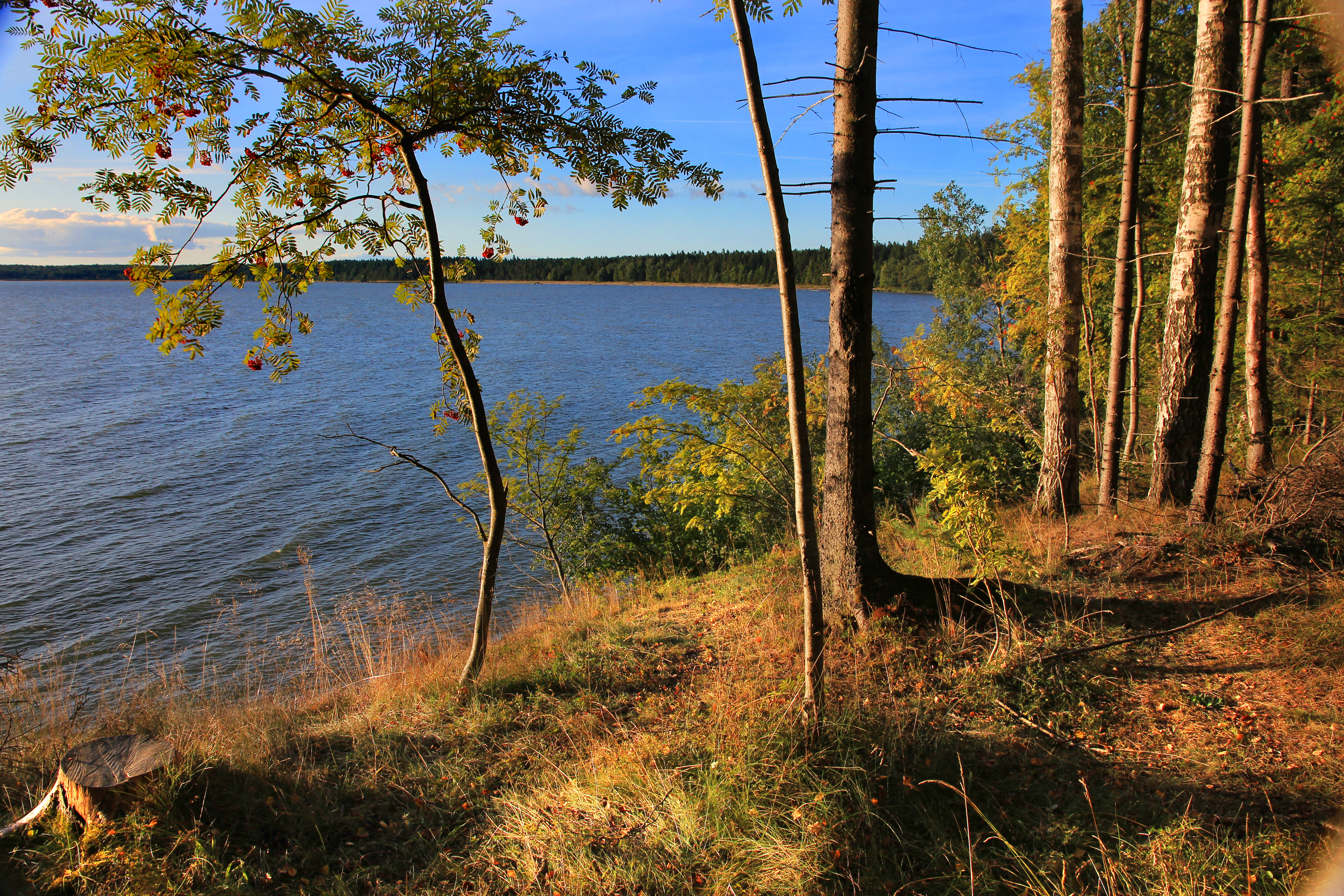
The Juminda Peninsula near its northern end

The Juminda Peninsula (Estonian: Juminda poolsaar) is a peninsula in Harju County, Estonia.

The peninsula is bordered by Hara Bay to the northeast and Kolga Bay to the southwest. The peninsula is about 13 km long and about 6 km wide (at its south end). Majakivi, the third-largest boulder in Estonia, is located on the Juminda Peninsula.
