= Valgejõgi =

River in Estonia

Coordinates: 59°34′58″N 25°42′22″E

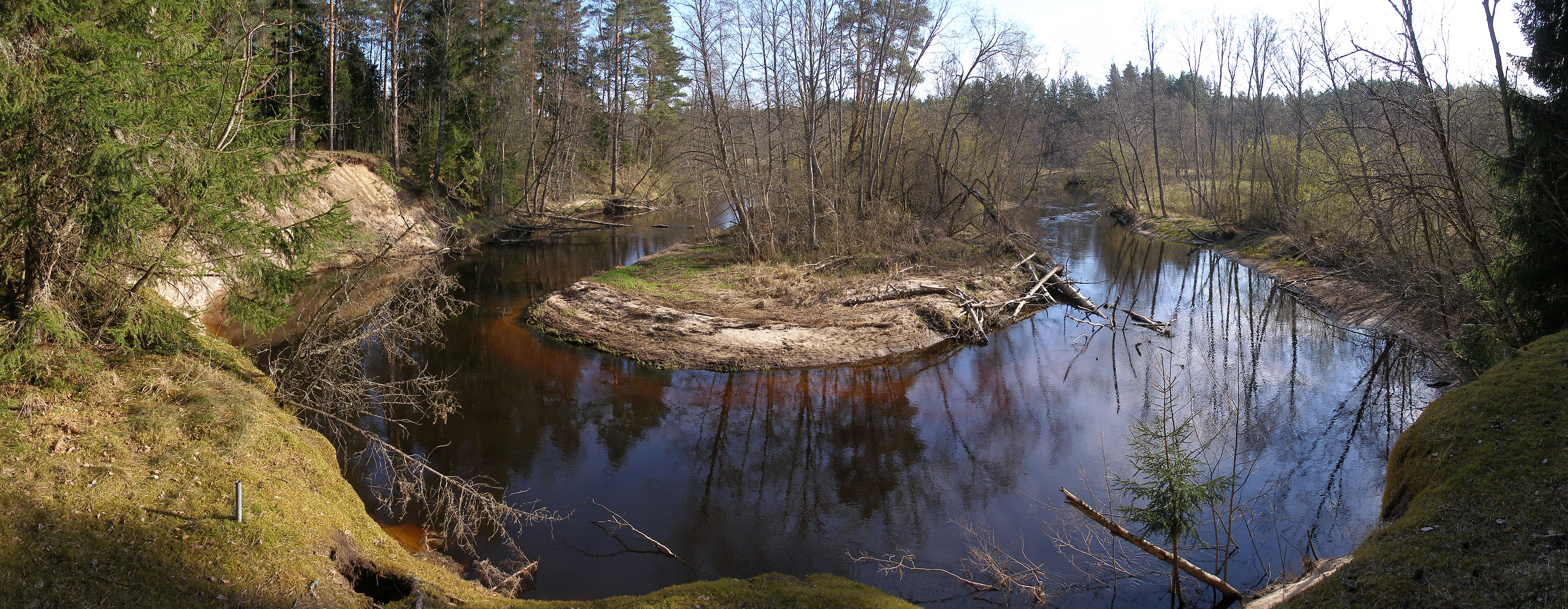
- Valgejõgi near Kotka

Location
- Country: Estonia

Physical characteristics
- Source
  - location: Lake Porkuni
  - elevation: 107 m (351 ft)
- Mouth
  - location: Hara Bay in Finnish Gulf
  - elevation: 0 m (0 ft)
- Length: 85 km (53 mi)
- Basin size: 453 km^{2} (175 sq mi)
- Discharge
  - average: 3.5–4.0 m^{3}/s (120–140 cu ft/s)

Valgejõgi (lit. White River) is a river in northern Estonia. Its source is in Lake Porkuni in Pandivere (Lääne-Viru County) and it drains into Hara Bay (part of Finnish Gulf) at Loksa (Harju County).

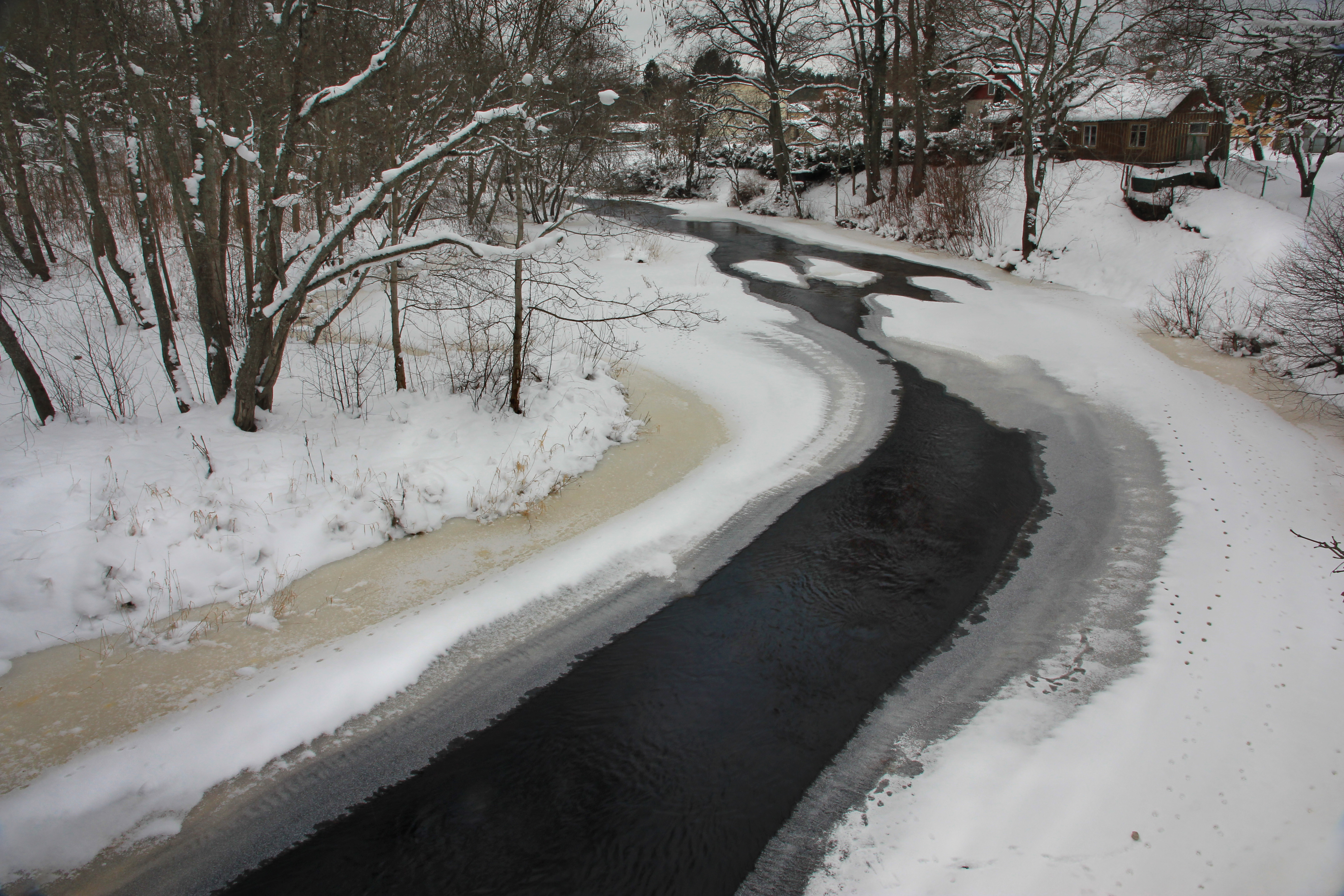
White River (Valgejõgi) flowing through the city of Loksa

== Geography ==
Valgejõgi lacks any major tributaries. Its drainage basin is long and narrow, dominated by forests and wetlands (more than two-thirds of the total area). Agricultural land use is concentrated in the upper section of drainage basin, while forests dominate in the middle and lower sections, where the river borders the Põhja-Kõrvemaa Nature Reserve and flows through Lahemaa National Park. The towns of Loksa (in the mouth) and Tapa (about 17 km from the source) are the only significant settlements on the river.

=== Nõmmeveski Falls ===
19 km upstream from the river mouth the river flows over the Baltic Klint, forming Nõmmeveski Falls. The waterfall and Nõmmeveski Canyon (several tens of meters deep and a few hundred meters long) are a popular tourist destination in Lahemaa National Park.

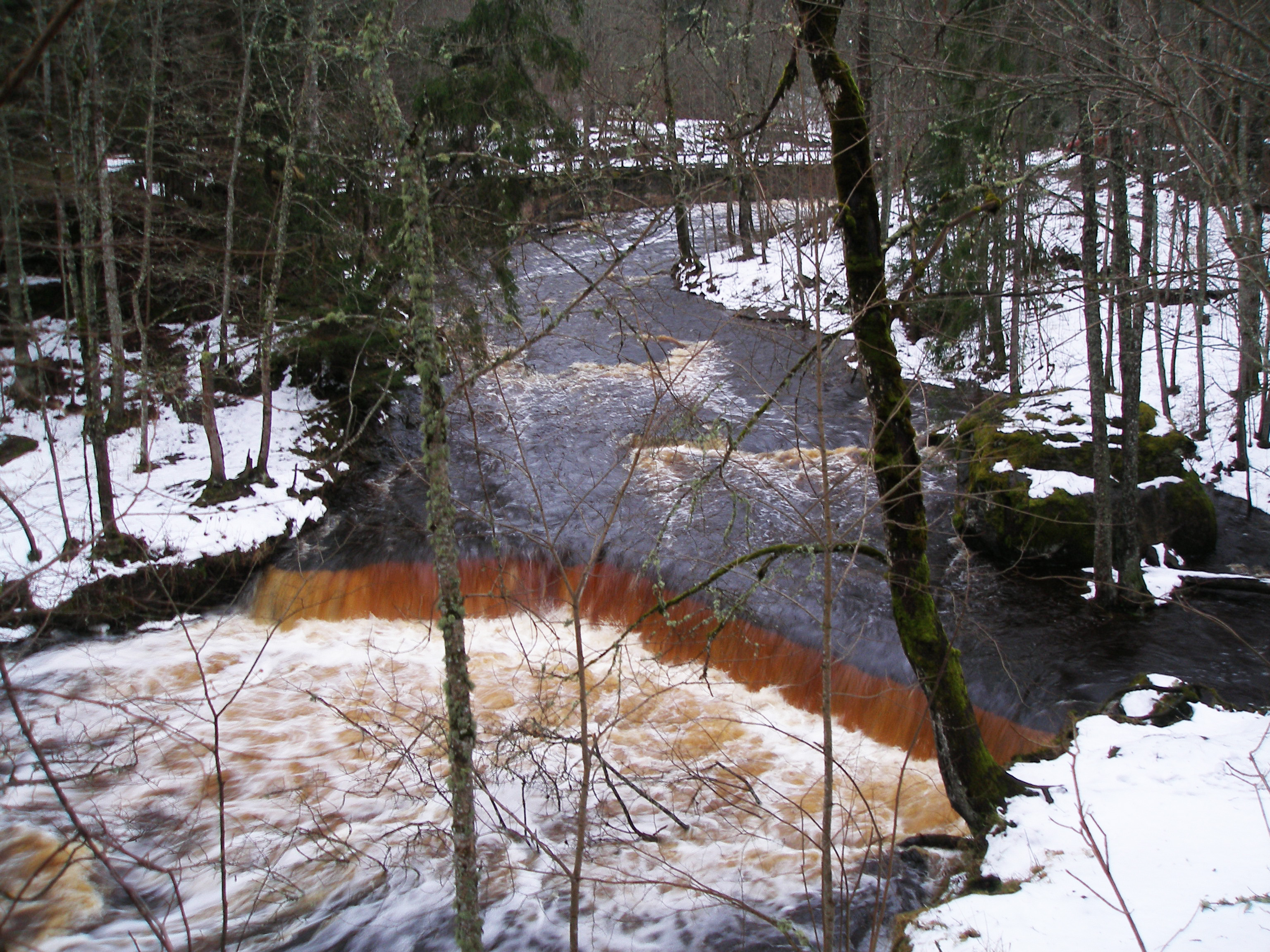
Nõmmeveski Falls in winter
