= Hara Bay =

Bay in Estonia

Coordinates: 59.62°N 25.63°E

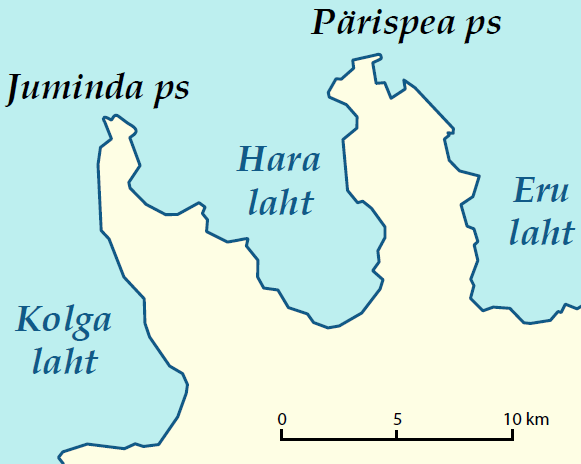
Hara Bay is located between Juminda and Pärispea Peninsula

Hara Bay (Estonian: Hara laht) is a bay in Harju County, Estonia. The bay is located between Juminda and Pärispea Peninsula. The bay's area is 9859 ha.

A part of Hara Bay is under protection (Lahemaa National Park).

Two rivers flows into the bay: Valgejõgi and Lohja Stream.
