= Members of the 12th Riigikogu =

Members of Parliament of Estonia 2011–2015

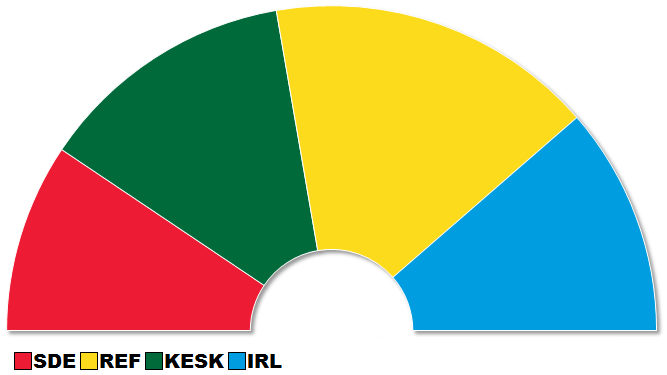
Distribution of seats in the Estonian parliament 2011-2015

This is a list of the members of the 12th Riigikogu, following the 2011 election.

== Election results ==
Party	Votes	%	Seats	+/–
Estonian Reform Party	164,255	28.6	33	+2
Estonian Centre Party	134,124	23.3	26	–3
Pro Patria and Res Publica Union	118,023	20.5	23	+4
Social Democratic Party	98,307	17.1	19	+9
Estonian Greens	21,824	3.8	0	–6
People's Union of Estonia	12,184	2.1	0	–6
Russian Party in Estonia	5,029	0.9	0	0
Party of Estonian Christian Democrats	2,934	0.5	0	0
Estonian Independence Party	2,571	0.4	0	0
Independents	15,882	2.8	0	0
Invalid/blank votes	5,131	–	–	–
Total	580,264	100	101	0
Registered voters/turnout	913,346	63.5	–	–
Source: VVK

== Lists ==
=== By party ===
==== Estonian Reform Party (33) ====
Name	Constituency
Arto Aas	Kesklinn, Lasnamäe and Pirita
Andrus Ansip	Harju and Rapla
Peep Aru	Järva and Viljandi
Igor Gräzin	Jõgeva and Tartu
Aare Heinvee	Harju and Rapla
Remo Holsmer	Haabersti, Põhja-Tallinn and Kristiine
Jüri Jaanson	Harju and Rapla
Kalle Jents	Järva and Viljandi
Laine Jänes	Tartu
Kaja Kallas	Harju and Rapla
Urmas Klaas	Võru, Valga and Põlva
Urmas Kruuse	Tartu
Tõnis Kõiv	Järva and Viljandi
Rein Lang	Pärnu
Tarmo Leinatamm	Haabersti, Põhja-Tallinn and Kristiine
Jürgen Ligi	Järva and Viljandi
Kalev Lillo	Harju and Rapla
Väino Linde	Pärnu
Lauri Luik	Hiiu, Lääne and Saare
Rait Maruste	Tartu
Kristen Michal	Kesklinn, Lasnamäe and Pirita
Meelis Mälberg	Võru, Valga and Põlva
Kristiina Ojuland	Ida-Viru
Urmas Paet	Mustamäe and Nõmme
Kalle Palling	Harju and Rapla
Keit Pentus	Kesklinn, Lasnamäe and Pirita
Hanno Pevkur	Lääne-Viru
Mati Raidma	Jõgeva and Tartu
Valdo Randpere	Võru, Valga and Põlva
Taavi Rõivas	Haabersti, Põhja-Tallinn and Kristiine
Aivar Sõerd	Mustamäe and Nõmme
Jaanus Tamkivi	Hiiu, Lääne and Saare
Urve Tiidus	Hiiu, Lääne and Saare

==== Estonian Centre Party (26) ====
Name	Constituency
Deniss Boroditš	Haabersti, Põhja-Tallinn and Kristiine
Enn Eesmaa	Järva and Viljandi
Eldar Efendijev	Ida-Viru
Lembit Kaljuvee	Ida-Viru
Kalev Kallo	Haabersti, Põhja-Tallinn and Kristiine
Valeri Korb	Ida-Viru
Mihhail Kõlvart	Kesklinn, Lasnamäe and Pirita
Kalle Laanet	Hiiu, Lääne and Saare
Heimar Lenk	Võru, Valga and Põlva
Inara Luigas	Võru, Valga and Põlva
Aadu Must	Tartu
Jüri Ratas	Mustamäe and Nõmme
Mailis Reps	Harju and Rapla
Aivar Riisalu	Harju and Rapla
Edgar Savisaar	Kesklinn, Lasnamäe and Pirita
Kadri Simson	Pärnu
Mihhail Stalnuhhin	Ida-Viru
Olga Sõtnik	Kesklinn, Lasnamäe and Pirita
Priit Toobal	Järva and Viljandi
Yana Toom	Haabersti, Põhja-Tallinn and Kristiine
Ester Tuiksoo	Võru, Valga and Põlva
Marika Tuus	Jõgeva and Tartu
Rainer Vakra	Mustamäe and Nõmme
Viktor Vassiljev	Haabersti, Põhja-Tallinn and Kristiine
Vladimir Velman	Harju and Rapla
Peeter Võsa	Lääne-Viru

==== Pro Patria and Res Publica Union (23) ====
Name	Constituency
Jaak Aaviksoo	Võru, Valga and Põlva
Annely Akkermann	Pärnu
Ene Ergma	Jõgeva and Tartu
Kaia Iva	Järva and Viljandi
Siim Valmar Kiisler	Mustamäe and Nõmme
Aivar Kokk	Jõgeva and Tartu
Mart Laar	Harju and Rapla
Tõnis Lukas	Tartu
Marko Mihkelson	Harju and Rapla
Erki Nool	Ida-Viru
Tõnis Palts	Hiiu, Lääne and Saare
Juhan Parts	Kesklinn, Lasnamäe and Pirita
Marko Pomerants	Lääne-Viru
Indrek Raudne	Kesklinn, Lasnamäe and Pirita
Urmas Reinsalu	Mustamäe and Nõmme
Reet Roos	Harju and Rapla
Helir-Valdor Seeder	Järva and Viljandi
Sven Sester	Kesklinn, Lasnamäe and Pirita
Priit Sibul	Võru, Valga and Põlva
Margus Tsahkna	Tartu
Toomas Tõniste	Pärnumaa
Ken-Marti Vaher	Haabersti, Põhja-Tallinn and Kristiine

==== Social Democratic Party (19) ====
Name	Constituency
Jaak Allik	Ida-Viru
Andres Anvelt	Kesklinn, Lasnamäe and Pirita
Kalev Kotkas	Hiiu, Lääne and Saare
Peeter Kreitzberg	Mustamäe and Nõmme
Helmen Kütt	Järva and Viljandi
Kalvi Kõva	Võru, Valga and Põlva
Kajar Lember	Hiiu, Lääne and Saare
Marianne Mikko	Pärnu
Sven Mikser	Järva and Viljandi
Eiki Nestor	Haabersti, Põhja-Tallinn and Kristiine
Jevgeni Ossinovski	Ida-Viru
Ivari Padar	Võru, Valga and Põlva
Urve Palo	Harju and Rapla
Heljo Pikhof	Tartu
Karel Rüütli	Harju and Rapla
Indrek Saar	Lääne-Viru
Neeme Suur	Hiiu, Lääne and Saare
Rannar Vassiljev	Lääne-Virumaa
Jaan Õunapuu	Jõgeva and Tartu

=== By votes ===
	Name	Votes	Party
1.	Edgar Savisaar	23,000	Kesk
2.	Andrus Ansip	18,967	Ref
3.	Urmas Paet	10,779	Ref
4.	Mart Laar	9,541	IRL
5.	Keit Pentus	8,784	Ref
6.	Mihhail Stalnuhhin	8,584	Kesk
7.	Jüri Ratas	7,620	Kesk
8.	Sven Mikser	7,431	SDE
9.	Kaja Kallas	7,153	Ref
10.	Urmas Kruuse	6,824	Ref
Source: VVK
