= Members of the 11th Riigikogu =

Members of Parliament of Estonia 2007–2011

This is a list of the members of the 11th Riigikogu, following the 2007 election.

== Election results ==
Party	Votes	%	Seats	+/–
Estonian Reform Party	153,044	27.8	31	+12
Estonian Centre Party	143,518	26.1	29	+1
Pro Patria and Res Publica Union	98,347	17.9	19	–16
Social Democratic Party	58,363	10.6	10	+4
Estonian Greens	39,279	7.1	6	New
People's Union of Estonia	39,215	7.1	6	–7
Party of Estonian Christian Democrats	9,456	1.7	0	0
Constitution Party	5,464	1.0	0	0
Estonian Independence Party	1,273	0.2	0	0
Russian Party in Estonia	1,084	0.2	0	0
Estonian Left Party	607	0.1	0	0
Independents	563	0.1	0	0
Invalid/blank votes	5,250	–	–	–
Total	555,463	100	101	0
Registered voters/turnout	897,243	61.9	–	–
Source: VVK

== Lists ==
=== By party ===
==== Estonian Reform Party (31) ====
Name	Constituency
Rein Aidma	Ida-Viru
Andrus Ansip	Harju and Rapla
Peep Aru	Järva and Viljandi
Hannes Astok	Tartu
Meelis Atonen	Järva and Viljandi
Ivi Eenmaa	Võru, Valga and Põlva
Igor Gräzin	Jõgeva and Tartu
Laine Jänes	Tartu
Urmas Klaas	Võru, Valga and Põlva
Tõnis Kõiv	Järva and Viljandi
Rein Lang	Haabersti, Põhja-Tallinn and Kristiine
Margus Lepik	Võru, Valga and Põlva
Jürgen Ligi	Kesklinn, Lasnamäe and Pirita
Väino Linde	Pärnu
Lauri Luik	Hiiu, Lääne and Saare
Maret Maripuu	Mustamäe and Nõmme
Silver Meikar	Tartu
Kristen Michal	Kesklinn, Lasnamäe and Pirita
Kristiina Ojuland	Lääne-Viru
Urmas Paet	Mustamäe and Nõmme
Kalle Palling	Harju and Rapla
Keit Pentus	Kesklinn, Lasnamäe and Pirita
Jaanus Rahumägi	Ida-Viru
Mati Raidma	Pärnu
Rain Rosimannus	Harju and Rapla
Paul-Eerik Rummo	Mustamäe and Nõmme
Taavi Rõivas	Haabersti, Põhja-Tallinn and Kristiine
Jaak Salumets	Harju and Rapla
Imre Sooäär	Hiiu, Lääne and Saare
Jaanus Tamkivi	Hiiu, Lääne and Saare
Harri Õunapuu	Harju and Rapla

==== Estonian Centre Party (29) ====
Name	Constituency
Jaak Aab	Järva and Viljandi
Enn Eesmaa	Mustamäe and Nõmme
Eldar Efendijev	Ida-Viru
Helle Kalda	Mustamäe and Nõmme
Valeri Korb	Ida-Viru
Jaan Kundla	Järva and Viljandi
Tiit Kuusmik	Ida-Viru
Kalle Laanet	Pärnu
Lauri Laasi	Haabersti, Põhja-Tallinn and Kristiine
Heimar Lenk	Võru, Valga and Põlva
Inara Luigas	Võru, Valga and Põlva
Aadu Must	Tartu
Kadri Must	Pärnu
Siiri Oviir	Harju and Rapla
Nelli Privalova	Mustamäe and Nõmme
Rein Ratas	Kesklinn, Lasnamäe and Pirita
Jüri Ratas	Mustamäe and Nõmme
Mailis Reps	Harju and Rapla
Arvo Sarapuu	Järva and Viljandi
Vilja Savisaar	Haabersti, Põhja-Tallinn and Kristiine
Edgar Savisaar	Kesklinn, Lasnamäe and Pirita
Evelyn Sepp	Kesklinn, Lasnamäe and Pirita
Ain Seppik	Hiiu, Lääne and Saare
Mihhail Stalnuhhin	Ida-Viru
Olga Sõtnik	Kesklinn, Lasnamäe and Pirita
Toivo Tootsen	Võru, Valga and Põlva
Marika Tuus	Jõgeva and Tartu
Toomas Varek	Lääne-Viru
Vladimir Velman	Haabersti, Põhja-Tallinn and Kristiine

==== Pro Patria and Res Publica Union (19) ====
Name	Constituency
Jaak Aaviksoo	Haabersti, Põhja-Tallinn and Kristiine
Ene Ergma	Jõgeva and Tartu
Andres Herkel	Haabersti, Põhja-Tallinn and Kristiine
Kaia Iva	Järva and Viljandi
Tarmo Kõuts	Hiiu, Lääne and Saare
Mart Laar	Kesklinn, Lasnamäe and Pirita
Tõnis Lukas	Tartu
Marko Mihkelson	Harju and Rapla
Erki Nool	Võru, Valga and Põlva
Mart Nutt	Mustamäe and Nõmme
Juhan Parts	Mustamäe and Nõmme
Marko Pomerants	Lääne-Viru
Urmas Reinsalu	Mustamäe and Nõmme
Helir-Valdor Seeder	Järva and Viljandi
Peeter Tulviste	Tartu
Toomas Tõniste	Mustamäe and Nõmme
Ken-Marti Vaher	Haabersti, Põhja-Tallinn and Kristiine
Trivimi Velliste	Pärnu
Taavi Veskimägi	Harju and Rapla

==== Social Democratic Party (10) ====
Name	Constituency
Peeter Kreitzberg	Mustamäe and Nõmme
Sven Mikser	Järva and Viljandi
Eiki Nestor	Haabersti, Põhja-Tallinn and Kristiine
Ivari Padar	Võru, Valga and Põlva
Heljo Pikhof	Tartu
Indrek Saar	Lääne-Viru
Katrin Saks	Kesklinn, Lasnamäe and Pirita
Mark Soosaar	Pärnu
Andres Tarand	Hiiu, Lääne and Saare
Liina Tõnisson	Harju and Rapla

==== Estonian Greens (6) ====
Name	Constituency
Mart Jüssi	Pärnu
Valdur Lahtvee	Harju and Rapla
Aleksei Lotman	Hiiu, Lääne and Saare
Maret Merisaar	Haabersti, Põhja-Tallinn and Kristiine
Marek Strandberg	Harju and Rapla
Toomas Trapido	Tartu

==== People's Union of Estonia (6) ====
Name	Constituency
Jaanus Marrandi	Järva and Viljandi
Villu Reiljan	Jõgeva and Tartu
Karel Rüütli	Tartu
Erika Salumäe	Mustamäe and Nõmme
Mai Treial	Jõgeva and Tartu
Ester Tuiksoo	Võru, Valga and Põlva

=== By votes ===
	Name	Votes	Party
1.	Andrus Ansip	22,540	Ref
2.	Edgar Savisaar	18,003	Kesk
3.	Laine Jänes	9,303	Ref
4.	Mart Laar	9,237	IRL
5.	Urmas Paet	8,685	Ref
6.	Vilja Savisaar	8,531	Kesk
7.	Keit Pentus	7,049	Ref
8.	Rein Lang	7,025	Ref
9.	Jüri Ratas	6,109	Kesk
10.	Taavi Veskimägi	5,790	IRL
Source: VVK
