= Riigikogu electoral district no. 2 =

Electoral district of Estonia

Electoral district no. 2
- Valimisringkond nr 2
- Electoral District for the Riigikogu
- Location of Electoral district no. 2 within Estonia
- Municipality: Tallinn
- County: Harju
- Population: 199,531 (2020)
- Electorate: 111,135 (2019)

Current Electoral District
- Created: 1995
- Seats: List: 13 (2019–present); 12 (2015–2019); 11 (2007–2015); 10 (1999–2007); 9 (1995–1999)
- Member of the Riigikogu: List: Maria Jufereva-Skuratovski (K); Siim Kallas (RE); Mihhail Korb (K); Leo Kunnas (EKRE); Viktoria Ladõnskaja-Kubits (I); Tõnis Mölder (K); Jevgeni Ossinovski (SDE); Keit Pentus-Rosimannus (RE); Mailis Reps (K); Erki Savisaar (K); Sven Sester (I); Kristina Šmigun-Vähi (RE); Imre Sooäär (K); Andres Sutt (RE)

Electoral district no. 2 (Estonian: Valimisringkond nr 2) is one of the 12 multi-member electoral districts of the Riigikogu, the national legislature of Estonia. The electoral district was established in 1995 following the re-organisation of the electoral districts in Tallinn. It is conterminous with the districts of Kesklinn, Lasnamäe and Pirita in Tallinn. The district currently elects 13 of the 101 members of the Riigikogu using the open party-list proportional representation electoral system. At the 2019 parliamentary election it had 111,135 registered electors.

== Electoral system ==
Electoral district no. 2 currently elects 13 of the 101 members of the Riigikogu using the open party-list proportional representation electoral system. The allocation of seats is carried out in three stages. In the first stage, any individual candidate, regardless of whether they are a party or independent candidate, who receives more votes than the district's simple quota (Hare quota: valid votes in district/number of seats allocated to district) is elected via a personal mandate. In the second stage, district mandates are allocated to parties by dividing their district votes by the district's simple quota. Only parties that reach the 5% national threshold compete for district mandates and any personal mandates won by the party are subtracted from the party's district mandates. Prior to 2003 if a party's surplus/remainder votes was equal to or greater than 75% of the district's simple quota it received one additional district mandate. Any unallocated district seats are added to a national pool of compensatory seats. In the final stage, compensatory mandates are calculated based on the national vote and using a modified D'Hondt method. Only parties that reach the 5% national threshold compete for compensatory seats and any personal and district mandates won by the party are subtracted from the party's compensatory mandates. Though calculated nationally, compensatory mandates are allocated at the district level.

=== Seats ===
Seats allocated to electoral district no. 2 by the National Electoral Committee of Estonia at each election was as follows:

- 2023 - 13
- 2019 - 13
- 2015 - 12
- 2011 - 11
- 2007 - 11
- 2003 - 10
- 1999 - 10
- 1995 - 9

== Election results ==
=== Summary ===
| Election | Left EÜVP/EVP/ESDTP/Õ/V | | | Constitution K/EÜRP/MKOE | | | Social Democrats SDE/RM/M | | | Greens EER/NJ/R | | | Centre K/R | | | Reform RE | | | Isamaa I/IRL/I/I\ERSP/I | | | Conservative People's EKRE/ERL/EME/KMÜ | | |
| Election | Votes | % | Seats | Votes | % | Seats | Votes | % | Seats | Votes | % | Seats | Votes | % | Seats | Votes | % | Seats | Votes | % | Seats | Votes | % | Seats |
|---|---|---|---|---|---|---|---|---|---|---|---|---|---|---|---|---|---|---|---|---|---|---|---|---|
| 2023 | 3,697 | 4.94% | 0 | | | | 6,434 | 8.60% | 1 | 765 | 1.02% | 0 | 21,693 | 29.00% | 4 | 22,012 | 29.42% | 4 | 4,020 | 5.37% | 0 | 6,772 | 9.05% | 1 |
| 2019 | 113 | 0.16% | 0 | | | | 5,896 | 8.43% | 1 | 1,471 | 2.10% | 0 | 26,335 | 37.64% | 5 | 18,400 | 26.30% | 3 | 5,416 | 7.74% | 1 | 7,110 | 10.16% | 1 |
| 2015 | 58 | 0.08% | 0 | | | | 7,827 | 10.53% | 1 | 598 | 0.80% | 0 | 31,706 | 42.66% | 3 | 16,235 | 21.84% | 2 | 8,058 | 10.84% | 1 | 3,396 | 4.57% | 0 |
| 2011 | | | | | | | 7,870 | 11.07% | 1 | 2,782 | 3.91% | 0 | 28,440 | 40.02% | 3 | 15,468 | 21.76% | 2 | 12,337 | 17.36% | 2 | 392 | 0.55% | 0 |
| 2007 | 74 | 0.12% | 0 | 1,462 | 2.29% | 0 | 4,888 | 7.65% | 1 | 4,172 | 6.53% | 0 | 24,913 | 39.00% | 4 | 13,553 | 21.22% | 2 | 12,711 | 19.90% | 2 | 829 | 1.30% | 0 |
| 2003 | 204 | 0.38% | 0 | 2,066 | 3.82% | 0 | 2,914 | 5.39% | 0 | | | | 18,026 | 33.37% | 3 | 10,798 | 19.99% | 2 | 3,570 | 6.61% | 0 | 1,932 | 3.58% | 0 |
| 1999 | | | | 8,346 | 16.06% | 1 | 5,245 | 10.10% | 1 | | | | 10,797 | 20.78% | 2 | 10,355 | 19.93% | 1 | 10,357 | 19.93% | 1 | 903 | 1.74% | 0 |
| 1995 | 1,142 | 2.04% | 0 | 9,189 | 16.40% | 1 | 2,405 | 4.29% | 0 | 581 | 1.04% | 0 | 9,339 | 16.67% | 1 | 12,691 | 22.65% | 2 | 5,181 | 9.25% | 0 | 10,206 | 18.21% | 1 |

(Excludes compensatory seats)

=== Detailed ===
Party has received at least 5% of the vote nationally and is entitled to compete for district seats.

==== 2023 ====
Results of the 2023 parliamentary election held on 5 March 2023:

| Party | | Votes per district | | | | | Total Votes | % | Seats | | | |
| Party | | Kesk- linn | Las- namäe | Pirita | Expat- riates | Elec- tronic | Total Votes | % | Per. | Dis. | Com. | Tot. |
|---|---|---|---|---|---|---|---|---|---|---|---|---|
| Estonian Reform Party | REF | 2,467 | 1,920 | 993 | 67 | 16,102 | 22,012 | 29.42% | 1 | 3 | 0 | 4 |
| Estonian Centre Party | KESK | 1,965 | 12,829 | 765 | 21 | 5,658 | 21,693 | 29.00% | 1 | 3 | 1 | 5 |
| Estonia 200 | EE200 | 1,078 | 878 | 374 | 12 | 5,601 | 8,147 | 10.89% | 0 | 1 | 1 | 2 |
| Conservative People's Party of Estonia | EKRE | 1,593 | 1,977 | 652 | 76 | 2,077 | 6,772 | 9.05% | 0 | 1 | 0 | 1 |
| Social Democratic Party | SDE | 936 | 812 | 227 | 19 | 4,246 | 6,434 | 8.60% | 0 | 1 | 0 | 1 |
| Isamaa | IE | 773 | 646 | 328 | 9 | 2,100 | 4,020 | 5.37% | 0 | 0 | 1 | 1 |
| Estonian United Left Party | EÜVP | 243 | 2,641 | 127 | 13 | 598 | 3,697 | 4.94% | 0 | 0 | 0 | 0 |
| Parempoolsed | | 189 | 101 | 84 | 2 | 791 | 1,202 | 1.61% | 0 | 0 | 0 | 0 |
| Estonian Greens | EER | 123 | 124 | 34 | 3 | 455 | 765 | 1.02% | 0 | 0 | 0 | 0 |
| Indrek Nicholas Nurmberg (Independent) | | 13 | 41 | 5 | 0 | 9 | 71 | 0.09% | 0 | 0 | 0 | 0 |
| Valid votes | | 9,380 | 21,969 | 3,589 | 222 | 37,637 | 74,813 | 100.00% | 2 | 9 | 3 | 14 |
| Rejected votes | | 80 | 85 | 37 | 4 | 0 | 431 | 0.60% | | | | |
| Total polled | | 9,460 | 22,234 | 3,626 | 226 | 37,637 | 75,264 | 61.84% | | | | |
| Registered electors | | 37,726 | 60,304 | 12,810 | 10,863 | | 121,703 | | | | | |

The following candidates were elected:

- Personal mandates - Siim Kallas (REF), 7,393 votes and Mihhail Kõlvart (KESK), 14,592 votes.
- District mandates - Karmen Joller (REF), 3,566 votes; Maria Jufereva-Skuratovski (KESK), 822 votes; Leo Kunnas (EKRE), 3,390 votes; Jevgeni Ossinovski (SDE), 2,437 votes; Heidy Purga (REF), 4,161 votes; Marek Reinaas (EE200), 2,090 votes; Andres Sutt (REF), 3,315 votes; Vladimir Svet (KESK), 1,867 votes; and Aleksandr Tšaplõgin (KESK), 1,809 votes.
- Compensatory mandates - Tõnis Mölder (KESK), 570 votes; Liisa-Ly Pakosta (EE200), 1,731 votes; and Riho Terras (IE), 1,724 votes.

==== 2019 ====
Results of the 2019 parliamentary election held on 3 March 2019:

| Party | | Votes per district | | | | | Total Votes | % | Seats | | | |
| Party | | Kesk- linn | Las- namäe | Pirita | Expat- riates | Elec- tronic | Total Votes | % | Per. | Dis. | Com. | Tot. |
|---|---|---|---|---|---|---|---|---|---|---|---|---|
| Estonian Centre Party | K | 3,186 | 16,772 | 1,229 | 54 | 5,094 | 26,335 | 37.64% | 1 | 4 | 0 | 5 |
| Estonian Reform Party | RE | 2,709 | 1,779 | 1,122 | 66 | 12,724 | 18,400 | 26.30% | 1 | 2 | 1 | 4 |
| Conservative People's Party of Estonia | EKRE | 1,770 | 1,892 | 715 | 81 | 2,652 | 7,110 | 10.16% | 0 | 1 | 0 | 1 |
| Social Democratic Party | SDE | 1,005 | 967 | 280 | 40 | 3,604 | 5,896 | 8.43% | 0 | 1 | 0 | 1 |
| Isamaa | I | 1,126 | 970 | 426 | 30 | 2,864 | 5,416 | 7.74% | 0 | 1 | 1 | 2 |
| Estonia 200 | | 662 | 581 | 287 | 12 | 2,219 | 3,761 | 5.38% | 0 | 0 | 0 | 0 |
| Estonian Greens | EER | 301 | 241 | 81 | 12 | 836 | 1,471 | 2.10% | 0 | 0 | 0 | 0 |
| Estonian Biodiversity Party | | 129 | 86 | 58 | 4 | 405 | 682 | 0.97% | 0 | 0 | 0 | 0 |
| Estonian Free Party | EVA | 84 | 94 | 37 | 3 | 233 | 451 | 0.64% | 0 | 0 | 0 | 0 |
| Hando Tõnumaa (Independent) | | 45 | 35 | 11 | 0 | 100 | 191 | 0.27% | 0 | 0 | 0 | 0 |
| Estonian United Left Party | EÜVP | 8 | 70 | 3 | 0 | 32 | 113 | 0.16% | 0 | 0 | 0 | 0 |
| Maarika Pähklemäe (Independent) | | 13 | 20 | 4 | 0 | 38 | 75 | 0.11% | 0 | 0 | 0 | 0 |
| Ege Hirv (Independent) | | 10 | 11 | 3 | 0 | 15 | 39 | 0.06% | 0 | 0 | 0 | 0 |
| Sergei Svjatušenko (Independent) | | 3 | 13 | 2 | 0 | 6 | 24 | 0.03% | 0 | 0 | 0 | 0 |
| Valid votes | | 11,051 | 23,531 | 4,258 | 302 | 30,822 | 69,964 | 100.00% | 2 | 9 | 2 | 13 |
| Rejected votes | | 94 | 250 | 45 | 8 | 0 | 397 | 0.56% | | | | |
| Total polled | | 11,145 | 23,781 | 4,303 | 310 | 30,822 | 70,361 | 63.31% | | | | |
| Registered electors | | 36,869 | 60,664 | 12,679 | 923 | | 111,135 | | | | | |

The following candidates were elected:

- Personal mandates - Siim Kallas (RE), 8,733 votes; and Mihhail Kõlvart (K), 17,150 votes.
- District mandates - Maria Jufereva-Skuratovski (K), 1,011 votes; Mihhail Korb (K), 1,114 votes; Leo Kunnas (EKRE), 4,813 votes; Viktoria Ladõnskaja-Kubits (I), 1,259 votes; Jevgeni Ossinovski (SDE), 2,680 votes; Keit Pentus-Rosimannus (RE), 2,482 votes; Mailis Reps (K), 2,069 votes; Kristina Šmigun-Vähi (RE), 2,002 votes; and Vladimir Svet (Note: Vladimir Svet declined to take up a seat in the Riigikogu.) (K), 980 votes.
- Compensatory mandates - Sven Sester (I), 1,154 votes; and Andres Sutt (RE), 1,905 votes.

==== 2015 ====
Results of the 2015 parliamentary election held on 1 March 2015:

| Party | | Votes per district | | | | | Total Votes | % | Seats | | | |
| Party | | Kesk- linn | Las- namäe | Pirita | Expat- riates | Elec- tronic | Total Votes | % | Per. | Dis. | Com. | Tot. |
|---|---|---|---|---|---|---|---|---|---|---|---|---|
| Estonian Centre Party | K | 4,441 | 23,086 | 1,441 | 63 | 2,675 | 31,706 | 42.66% | 1 | 2 | 1 | 4 |
| Estonian Reform Party | RE | 3,455 | 2,699 | 1,553 | 38 | 8,490 | 16,235 | 21.84% | 0 | 2 | 0 | 2 |
| Pro Patria and Res Publica Union | IRL | 1,889 | 1,523 | 724 | 45 | 3,877 | 8,058 | 10.84% | 0 | 1 | 0 | 1 |
| Social Democratic Party | SDE | 1,920 | 1,758 | 601 | 36 | 3,512 | 7,827 | 10.53% | 0 | 1 | 0 | 1 |
| Estonian Free Party | EVA | 1,538 | 1,036 | 588 | 19 | 2,898 | 6,079 | 8.18% | 0 | 1 | 1 | 2 |
| Conservative People's Party of Estonia | EKRE | 963 | 999 | 427 | 11 | 996 | 3,396 | 4.57% | 0 | 0 | 0 | 0 |
| Estonian Greens | EER | 194 | 144 | 40 | 3 | 217 | 598 | 0.80% | 0 | 0 | 0 | 0 |
| Party of People's Unity | RÜE | 29 | 49 | 11 | 1 | 31 | 121 | 0.16% | 0 | 0 | 0 | 0 |
| Maarika Pähklemäe (Independent) | | 26 | 25 | 7 | 0 | 24 | 82 | 0.11% | 0 | 0 | 0 | 0 |
| Estonian Independence Party | EIP | 19 | 18 | 12 | 1 | 8 | 58 | 0.08% | 0 | 0 | 0 | 0 |
| Estonian United Left Party | EÜVP | 13 | 29 | 6 | 0 | 10 | 58 | 0.08% | 0 | 0 | 0 | 0 |
| Henn Leetna (Independent) | | 11 | 17 | 6 | 0 | 8 | 42 | 0.06% | 0 | 0 | 0 | 0 |
| Greete Reinson (Independent) | | 10 | 10 | 4 | 0 | 18 | 42 | 0.06% | 0 | 0 | 0 | 0 |
| Ilmar Ibragimov (Independent) | | 8 | 12 | 0 | 0 | 6 | 26 | 0.03% | 0 | 0 | 0 | 0 |
| Valid votes | | 14,516 | 31,405 | 5,420 | 217 | 22,770 | 74,328 | 100.00% | 1 | 7 | 2 | 10 |
| Rejected votes | | 102 | 153 | 32 | 2 | 0 | 289 | 0.39% | | | | |
| Total polled | | 14,618 | 31,558 | 5,452 | 219 | 22,770 | 74,617 | 67.69% | | | | |
| Registered electors | | 36,266 | 61,407 | 12,341 | 219 | | 110,233 | | | | | |

The following candidates were elected:

- Personal mandates - Edgar Savisaar (K), 25,057 votes.
- District mandates - Arto Aas (RE), 2,517 votes; Andres Anvelt (SDE), 3,558 votes; Andres Herkel (EVA), 4,227 votes; Olga Ivanova (K), 1,948 votes; Mihhail Korb (K), 1,904 votes; Viktoria Ladõnskaja (IRL), 1,393 votes; and Keit Pentus-Rosimannus (RE), 5,716 votes.
- Compensatory mandates - Monika Haukanõmm (EVA), 450 votes; and Toomas Vitsut (K), 503 votes.

==== 2011 ====
Results of the 2011 parliamentary election held on 6 March 2011:

| Party | | Votes per district | | | | | Total Votes | % | Seats | | | |
| Party | | Kesk- linn | Las- namäe | Pirita | Expat- riates | Elec- tronic | Total Votes | % | Per. | Dis. | Com. | Tot. |
|---|---|---|---|---|---|---|---|---|---|---|---|---|
| Estonian Centre Party | K | 3,908 | 20,195 | 1,105 | 38 | 3,194 | 28,440 | 40.02% | 1 | 2 | 0 | 3 |
| Estonian Reform Party | RE | 3,667 | 3,345 | 1,829 | 51 | 6,576 | 15,468 | 21.76% | 1 | 1 | 1 | 3 |
| Pro Patria and Res Publica Union | IRL | 3,441 | 2,753 | 1,362 | 96 | 4,685 | 12,337 | 17.36% | 1 | 1 | 1 | 3 |
| Social Democratic Party | SDE | 2,136 | 2,324 | 680 | 23 | 2,707 | 7,870 | 11.07% | 0 | 1 | 0 | 1 |
| Estonian Greens | EER | 847 | 684 | 237 | 20 | 994 | 2,782 | 3.91% | 0 | 0 | 0 | 0 |
| Mart Helme (Independent) | | 518 | 565 | 162 | 1 | 507 | 1,753 | 2.47% | 0 | 0 | 0 | 0 |
| Russian Party in Estonia | VEE | 170 | 850 | 58 | 1 | 238 | 1,317 | 1.85% | 0 | 0 | 0 | 0 |
| People's Union of Estonia | ERL | 78 | 194 | 35 | 0 | 85 | 392 | 0.55% | 0 | 0 | 0 | 0 |
| Party of Estonian Christian Democrats | EKD | 65 | 91 | 16 | 1 | 52 | 225 | 0.32% | 0 | 0 | 0 | 0 |
| Estonian Independence Party | EIP | 59 | 72 | 12 | 1 | 23 | 167 | 0.23% | 0 | 0 | 0 | 0 |
| Anti Poolamets (Independent) | | 32 | 42 | 24 | 0 | 44 | 142 | 0.20% | 0 | 0 | 0 | 0 |
| Anne Eenpalu (Independent) | | 19 | 49 | 12 | 1 | 19 | 100 | 0.14% | 0 | 0 | 0 | 0 |
| Taira Aasa (Independent) | | 7 | 34 | 0 | 0 | 19 | 60 | 0.08% | 0 | 0 | 0 | 0 |
| Ilmar Ibragimov (Independent) | | 5 | 14 | 0 | 0 | 1 | 20 | 0.03% | 0 | 0 | 0 | 0 |
| Valid votes | | 14,952 | 31,212 | 5,532 | 233 | 19,144 | 71,073 | 100.00% | 3 | 5 | 2 | 10 |
| Rejected votes | | 111 | 179 | 33 | 10 | 0 | 333 | 0.47% | | | | |
| Total polled | | 15,063 | 31,391 | 5,565 | 243 | 19,144 | 71,406 | 68.35% | | | | |
| Registered electors | | 33,335 | 59,916 | 10,984 | 243 | | 104,478 | | | | | |

The following candidates were elected:

- Personal mandates - Juhan Parts (IRL), 6,608 votes; Keit Pentus (RE), 8,784 votes; and Edgar Savisaar (K), 23,000 votes.
- District mandates - Andres Anvelt (SDE), 3,441 votes; Mihhail Kõlvart (K), 1,039 votes; Kristen Michal (RE), 2,062 votes; Sven Sester (IRL), 1,129 votes; and Olga Sõtnik (K), 1,317 votes.
- Compensatory mandates - Arto Aas (RE), 524 votes; and Indrek Raudne (IRL), 774 votes.

==== 2007 ====
Results of the 2007 parliamentary election held on 4 March 2007:

| Party | | Votes per district | | | | | Total Votes | % | Seats | | | |
| Party | | Kesk- linn | Las- namäe | Pirita | Expat- riates | Elec- tronic | Total Votes | % | Per. | Dis. | Com. | Tot. |
|---|---|---|---|---|---|---|---|---|---|---|---|---|
| Estonian Centre Party | K | 4,660 | 18,408 | 1,219 | 18 | 608 | 24,913 | 39.00% | 1 | 3 | 1 | 5 |
| Estonian Reform Party | RE | 5,059 | 4,877 | 2,194 | 21 | 1,402 | 13,553 | 21.22% | 1 | 1 | 1 | 3 |
| Pro Patria and Res Publica Union | IRL | 5,284 | 3,958 | 1,873 | 260 | 1,336 | 12,711 | 19.90% | 1 | 1 | 0 | 2 |
| Social Democratic Party | SDE | 2,049 | 1,691 | 570 | 41 | 537 | 4,888 | 7.65% | 0 | 1 | 0 | 1 |
| Estonian Greens | EER | 1,638 | 1,507 | 552 | 24 | 451 | 4,172 | 6.53% | 0 | 0 | 0 | 0 |
| Constitution Party | K | 239 | 1,113 | 58 | 0 | 52 | 1,462 | 2.29% | 0 | 0 | 0 | 0 |
| Party of Estonian Christian Democrats | EKD | 348 | 473 | 137 | 6 | 49 | 1,013 | 1.59% | 0 | 0 | 0 | 0 |
| People's Union of Estonia | ERL | 232 | 453 | 100 | 2 | 42 | 829 | 1.30% | 0 | 0 | 0 | 0 |
| Russian Party in Estonia | VEE | 21 | 112 | 4 | 2 | 7 | 146 | 0.23% | 0 | 0 | 0 | 0 |
| Estonian Independence Party | EIP | 48 | 53 | 5 | 0 | 8 | 114 | 0.18% | 0 | 0 | 0 | 0 |
| Estonian Left Party | EVP | 30 | 33 | 4 | 0 | 7 | 74 | 0.12% | 0 | 0 | 0 | 0 |
| Valid votes | | 19,608 | 32,678 | 6,716 | 374 | 4,499 | 63,875 | 100.00% | 3 | 6 | 2 | 11 |
| Rejected votes | | 167 | 262 | 36 | 42 | 0 | 507 | 0.79% | | | | |
| Total polled | | 19,775 | 32,940 | 6,752 | 416 | 4,499 | 64,382 | 64.84% | | | | |
| Registered electors | | 31,926 | 57,302 | 9,655 | 416 | | 99,299 | | | | | |

The following candidates were elected:

- Personal mandates - Mart Laar (IRL), 9,237 votes; Keit Pentus (RE), 7,049 votes; and Edgar Savisaar (K), 18,003 votes.
- District mandates - Jürgen Ligi (RE), 1,656 votes; Nelli Privalova (K), 934 votes; Rein Ratas (K), 1,463 votes; Katrin Saks (SDE), 2,026 votes; Olga Sõtnik (K), 2,198 votes; and Toomas Tõniste (IRL), 909 votes.
- Compensatory mandates - Kristen Michal (RE), 914 votes; and Evelyn Sepp (K), 565 votes.

==== 2003 ====
Results of the 2003 parliamentary election held on 2 March 2003:

| Party | | Votes per district | | | | Total Votes | % | Seats | | | |
| Party | | Kesk- linn | Las- namäe | Pirita | Expat- riates | Total Votes | % | Per. | Dis. | Com. | Tot. |
|---|---|---|---|---|---|---|---|---|---|---|---|
| Estonian Centre Party | K | 4,708 | 12,192 | 1,098 | 28 | 18,026 | 33.37% | 1 | 2 | 2 | 5 |
| Union for the Republic–Res Publica | ÜVE-RP | 5,427 | 6,290 | 1,484 | 115 | 13,316 | 24.65% | 1 | 1 | 1 | 3 |
| Estonian Reform Party | RE | 4,189 | 4,927 | 1,643 | 39 | 10,798 | 19.99% | 1 | 1 | 0 | 2 |
| Pro Patria Union Party | I | 1,561 | 1,359 | 482 | 168 | 3,570 | 6.61% | 0 | 0 | 0 | 0 |
| Moderate People's Party | RM | 1,326 | 1,213 | 316 | 59 | 2,914 | 5.39% | 0 | 0 | 1 | 1 |
| Estonian United People's Party | EÜRP | 458 | 1,583 | 24 | 1 | 2,066 | 3.82% | 0 | 0 | 0 | 0 |
| People's Union of Estonia | ERL | 654 | 1,109 | 165 | 4 | 1,932 | 3.58% | 0 | 0 | 0 | 0 |
| Estonian Christian People's Party | EKRP | 231 | 294 | 83 | 1 | 609 | 1.13% | 0 | 0 | 0 | 0 |
| Estonian Independence Party | EIP | 128 | 153 | 57 | 0 | 338 | 0.63% | 0 | 0 | 0 | 0 |
| Estonian Social Democratic Labour Party | ESDTP | 95 | 98 | 11 | 0 | 204 | 0.38% | 0 | 0 | 0 | 0 |
| Russian Party in Estonia | VEE | 26 | 105 | 5 | 0 | 136 | 0.25% | 0 | 0 | 0 | 0 |
| Aado Luik (Independent) | | 38 | 40 | 4 | 0 | 82 | 0.15% | 0 | 0 | 0 | 0 |
| Aleksander Raag (Independent) | | 5 | 18 | 0 | 0 | 23 | 0.04% | 0 | 0 | 0 | 0 |
| Valid votes | | 18,846 | 29,381 | 5,372 | 415 | 54,014 | 100.00% | 3 | 4 | 4 | 11 |
| Rejected votes | | 200 | 221 | 41 | 9 | 471 | 0.86% | | | | |
| Total polled | | 19,046 | 29,602 | 5,413 | 424 | 54,485 | 61.58% | | | | |
| Registered electors | | 29,157 | 51,697 | 7,196 | 424 | 88,474 | | | | | |
| Turnout | | 65.32% | 57.26% | 75.22% | 100.00% | 61.58% | | | | | |

The following candidates were elected:

- Personal mandates - Signe Kivi (RE), 5,753 votes; Tõnis Palts (ÜVE-RP), 7,514 votes; and Edgar Savisaar (K), 12,960 votes.
- District mandates - Sergei Ivanov (RE), 1,140 votes; Nelli Privalova (K), 862 votes; Indrek Raudne (ÜVE-RP), 1,408 votes; and Jüri Šehovtsov (K), 1,117 votes.
- Compensatory mandates - Küllo Arjakas (K), 415 votes; Katrin Saks (RM), 1,770 votes; Sven Sester (ÜVE-RP), 848 votes; and Toivo Tootsen (K), 301 votes.

==== 1999 ====
Results of the 1999 parliamentary election held on 7 March 1999:

| Party | | Votes per district | | | | Total Votes | % | Seats | | | |
| Party | | Kesk- linn | Las- namäe | Pirita | Expat- riates | Total Votes | % | Per. | Dis. | Com. | Tot. |
|---|---|---|---|---|---|---|---|---|---|---|---|
| Estonian Centre Party | K | 4,115 | 5,810 | 856 | 16 | 10,797 | 20.78% | 1 | 1 | 2 | 4 |
| Pro Patria Union | I | 4,386 | 4,552 | 1,043 | 376 | 10,357 | 19.93% | 1 | 0 | 1 | 2 |
| Estonian Reform Party | RE | 4,267 | 4,763 | 1,295 | 30 | 10,355 | 19.93% | 0 | 1 | 0 | 1 |
| Estonian United People's Party | EÜRP | 1,313 | 6,948 | 84 | 1 | 8,346 | 16.06% | 0 | 1 | 0 | 1 |
| Moderate | M | 2,213 | 2,429 | 538 | 65 | 5,245 | 10.10% | 0 | 1 | 0 | 1 |
| Russian Party in Estonia | VEE | 420 | 1,322 | 7 | 0 | 1,749 | 3.37% | 0 | 0 | 0 | 0 |
| Estonian Coalition Party | KE | 755 | 757 | 135 | 1 | 1,648 | 3.17% | 0 | 0 | 0 | 0 |
| Estonian Christian People's Party | EKRP | 553 | 748 | 180 | 14 | 1,495 | 2.88% | 0 | 0 | 0 | 0 |
| Estonian Country People's Party | EME | 330 | 449 | 119 | 5 | 903 | 1.74% | 0 | 0 | 0 | 0 |
| Estonian Blue Party | ESE | 282 | 260 | 68 | 7 | 617 | 1.19% | 0 | 0 | 0 | 0 |
| Progress Party | | 47 | 69 | 32 | 0 | 148 | 0.28% | 0 | 0 | 0 | 0 |
| Farmers' Assembly | | 39 | 65 | 12 | 3 | 119 | 0.23% | 0 | 0 | 0 | 0 |
| Heikki Tann (Independent) | | 51 | 56 | 11 | 1 | 119 | 0.23% | 0 | 0 | 0 | 0 |
| Eldur Peterson (Independent) | | 25 | 30 | 1 | 2 | 58 | 0.11% | 0 | 0 | 0 | 0 |
| Valid votes | | 18,796 | 28,258 | 4,381 | 521 | 51,956 | 100.00% | 2 | 4 | 3 | 9 |
| Rejected votes | | 231 | 363 | 51 | 5 | 650 | 1.24% | | | | |
| Total polled | | 19,027 | 28,621 | 4,432 | 526 | 52,606 | 58.30% | | | | |
| Registered electors | | 31,728 | 51,839 | 6,141 | 526 | 90,234 | | | | | |
| Turnout | | 59.97% | 55.21% | 72.17% | 100.00% | 58.30% | | | | | |

The following candidates were elected:

- Personal mandates - Toivo Jürgenson (I), 7,506 votes; and Siiri Oviir (K), 5,346 votes.
- District mandates - Sergei Ivanov (EÜRP), 4,370 votes; Liis Klaar (M), 1,844 votes; Uno Mereste (RE), 4,900 votes; and Vladimir Velman (K), 1,132 votes.
- Compensatory mandates - Küllo Arjakas (K), 320 votes; Kadri Jäätma (I), 298 votes; and Toivo Tootsen (K), 301 votes.

==== 1995 ====
Results of the 1995 parliamentary election held on 5 March 1995:

| Party | | Votes per district | | | | Total Votes | % | Seats | | | |
| Party | | Kesk- linn | Las- namäe | Pirita | Expat- riates | Total Votes | % | Per. | Dis. | Com. | Tot. |
|---|---|---|---|---|---|---|---|---|---|---|---|
| Estonian Reform Party | RE | 5,063 | 6,075 | 1,339 | 214 | 12,691 | 22.65% | 1 | 1 | 0 | 2 |
| Coalition Party and Rural People's Association | KMÜ | 4,210 | 5,046 | 870 | 80 | 10,206 | 18.21% | 0 | 1 | 3 | 4 |
| Estonian Centre Party | K | 4,186 | 4,328 | 791 | 34 | 9,339 | 16.67% | 0 | 1 | 1 | 2 |
| Our Home is Estonia | MKOE | 2,185 | 6,915 | 83 | 6 | 9,189 | 16.40% | 0 | 1 | 1 | 2 |
| Pro Patria and ERSP Union | I\ERSP | 2,074 | 2,050 | 397 | 660 | 5,181 | 9.25% | 0 | 0 | 1 | 1 |
| Moderate | M | 990 | 1,125 | 228 | 62 | 2,405 | 4.29% | 0 | 0 | 1 | 1 |
| Better Estonia/Estonian Citizen | PE/EK | 592 | 684 | 177 | 19 | 1,472 | 2.63% | 0 | 0 | 0 | 0 |
| The Right Wingers | P | 626 | 576 | 121 | 78 | 1,401 | 2.50% | 0 | 0 | 0 | 0 |
| Justice | Õ | 704 | 376 | 54 | 8 | 1,142 | 2.04% | 0 | 0 | 0 | 0 |
| Estonian Future Party | TEE | 489 | 508 | 137 | 7 | 1,141 | 2.04% | 0 | 0 | 0 | 0 |
| Fourth Force | NJ | 260 | 252 | 59 | 10 | 581 | 1.04% | 0 | 0 | 0 | 0 |
| Blue Party | SE | 216 | 204 | 41 | 10 | 471 | 0.84% | 0 | 0 | 0 | 0 |
| Estonian National Federation | ERKL | 134 | 183 | 32 | 6 | 355 | 0.63% | 0 | 0 | 0 | 0 |
| Estonian Farmers' Party | ETRE | 88 | 131 | 23 | 10 | 252 | 0.45% | 0 | 0 | 0 | 0 |
| Priskilla Mändmets (Independent) | | 39 | 50 | 2 | 1 | 92 | 0.16% | 0 | 0 | 0 | 0 |
| Forest Party | | 36 | 29 | 6 | 0 | 71 | 0.13% | 0 | 0 | 0 | 0 |
| Estonian Democratic Union | EDL | 17 | 29 | 3 | 0 | 49 | 0.09% | 0 | 0 | 0 | 0 |
| Valid votes | | 21,909 | 28,561 | 4,363 | 1,205 | 56,038 | 100.00% | 1 | 4 | 7 | 12 |
| Rejected votes | | 167 | 291 | 31 | 0 | 489 | 0.87% | | | | |
| Total polled | | 22,076 | 28,852 | 4,394 | 1,205 | 56,527 | 71.34% | | | | |
| Registered electors | | 30,868 | 41,629 | 5,536 | 1,205 | 79,238 | | | | | |
| Turnout | | 71.52% | 69.31% | 79.37% | 100.00% | 71.34% | | | | | |

The following candidates were elected:

- Personal mandates - Uno Mereste (RE), 10,806 votes.
- District mandates - Sergei Ivanov (MKOE), 4,093 votes; Heiki Kranich (RE), 736 votes; Siiri Oviir (K), 5,455 votes; and Tiit Vähi (KMÜ), 5,942 votes.
- Compensatory mandates - Vahur Glaase (KMÜ), 369 votes; Toivo Jürgenson (I\ERSP), 4,205 votes; Raivo Paavo (M), 1,274 votes; Aino Runge (K), 812 votes; Igor Sedašev (MKOE), 225 votes; Mart Siimann (KMÜ), 484 votes; and Elmar Truu (KMÜ), 503 votes.
