= Lember =

Family name

Origin
- Language: Estonian
- Meaning: "crack willow" (Salix fragilis)
- Region of origin: Estonia

Lember is an Estonian surname meaning Salix fragilis; a deciduous willow more commonly called rabe remmelgas in Estonia. As of 1 January 2021, 356 men and 398 women in Estonia have the surname Lember. Lember is ranked as the 118th most common surname for men in Estonia, and 115th for women. The surname Lember is the most common in Saare County, where 73.82 per 10,000 inhabitants of the county bear the surname.

Notable people bearing the surname Lember include:

- Andres Lember (born 1972), architect
- Ira Lember (1926–2025), writer
- Juta Lember (born 1943), interior architect and designer
- Kajar Lember (born 1976), politician
- Mati Lember (born 1985), footballer
- Valli Lember-Bogatkina (1921–2016), artist
- Veiko Lember (born 1977), volleyball player
