= Peeter Võsa =

Estonian politician

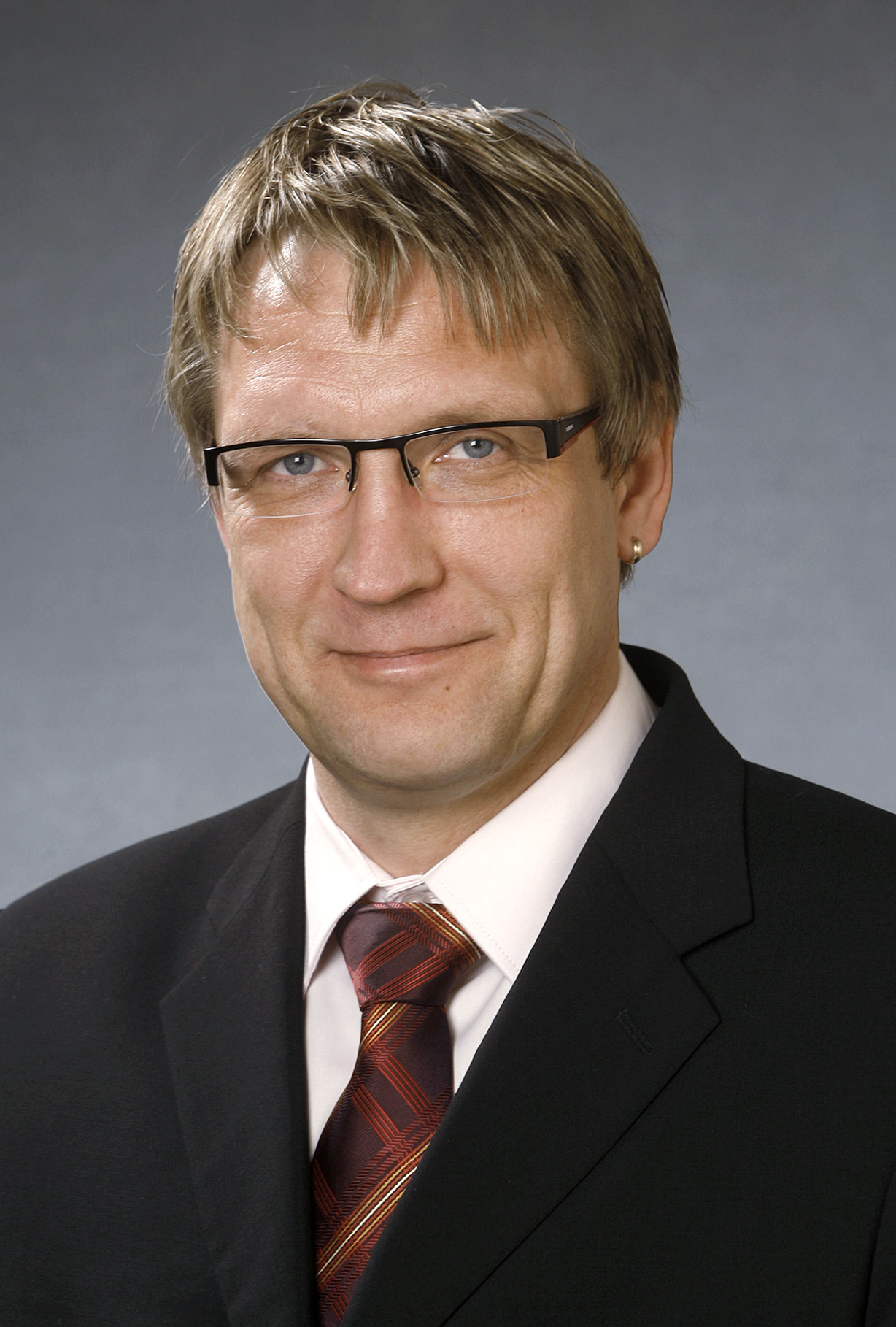
Peeter Võsa in 2011.

Peeter Võsa (born 28 December 1967 in Tallinn) is an Estonian journalist, television presenter and politician. He has been member of XII Riigikogu from 2011 to 2015, and a member of the Tallinn City Council from 2025.

He was a member of Estonian Centre Party from 2007 to 2019. From 2026 he is a member on Isamaa Party.
