= Inara Luigas =

Estonian politician

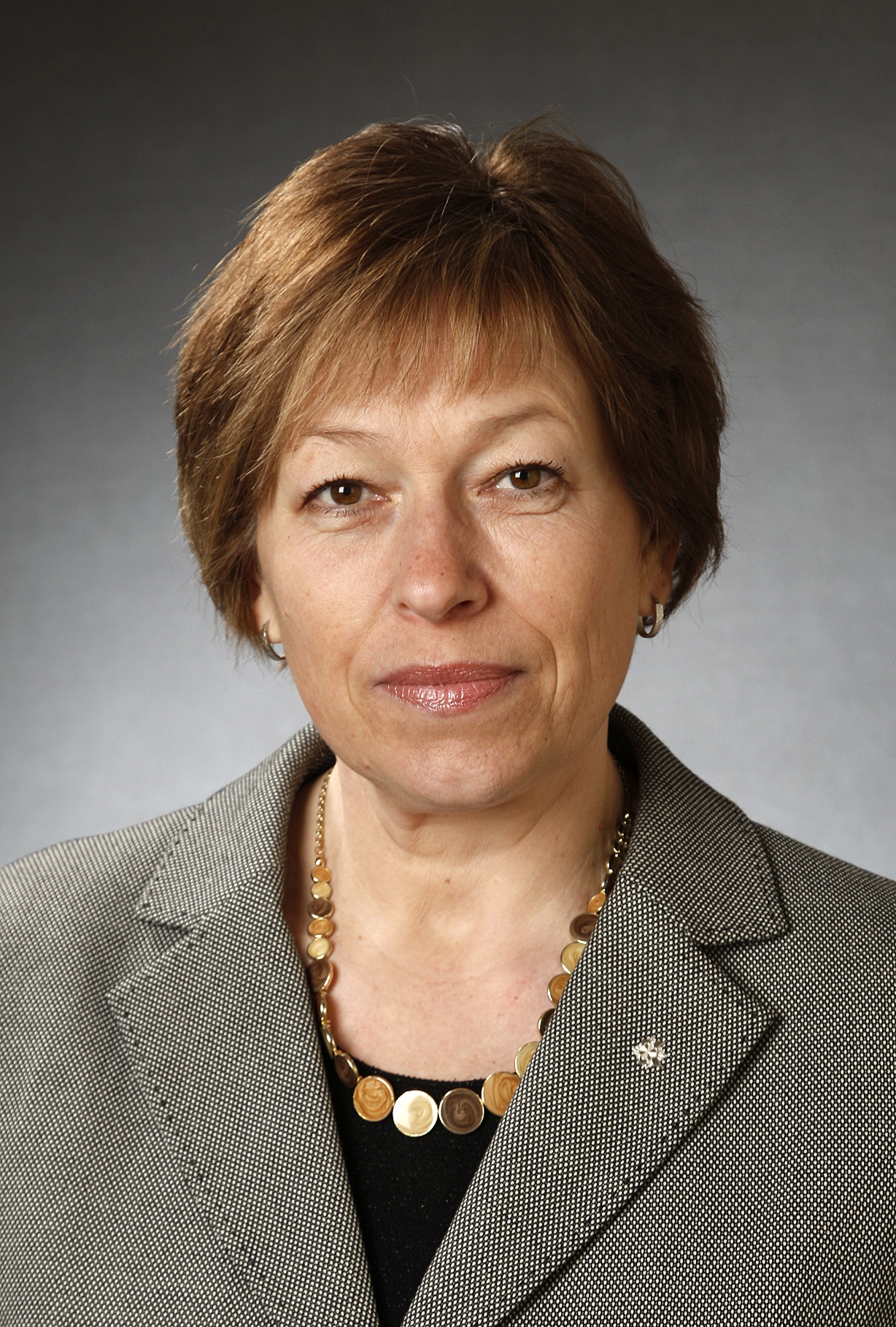
Inara Luigas

Inara Luigas (born 13 January 1959) is an Estonian politician. She was a member of the X Riigikogu, XI Riigikogu, XII Riigikogu and XIII Riigikogu.

She was born in Novosibirsk Oblast in Siberia. She is a member of the Estonian Centre Party.

In 2002 she was named to the Seto Kingdom's Elders Council (Estonian: Seto kuningriigi ülemsootska).
