= Andres Anvelt =

Estonian politician (born 1969)

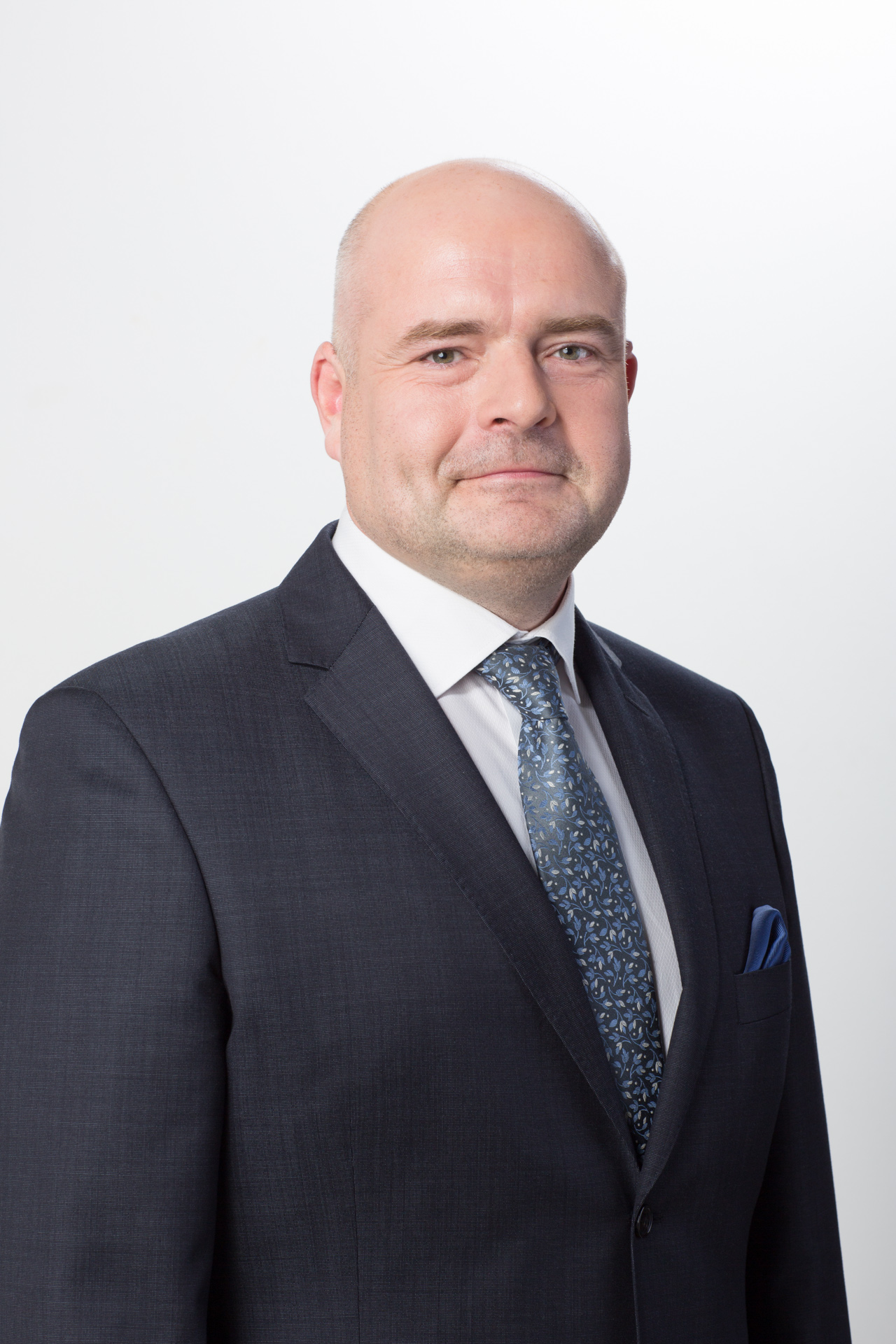
Andres Anvelt

Andres Anvelt (born on 30 September 1969 Tallinn) is an Estonian politician and writer. He belonged to Social Democratic Party until 2019.

From 2003 to 2006 he was director of the Estonian Academy of Security Sciences Police College (Estonian: Sisekaitseakadeemia politseikolledž).

Between 2011 and 2019 he was member of the XII Riigikogu and XIII Riigikogu.

From 2014 to 2015 he served as justice minister of Estonia (Estonian: Eesti justiitsminister).

He is the grandson of communist revolutionary Jaan Anvelt.
