= Sven Sester =

Estonian politician (born 1969)

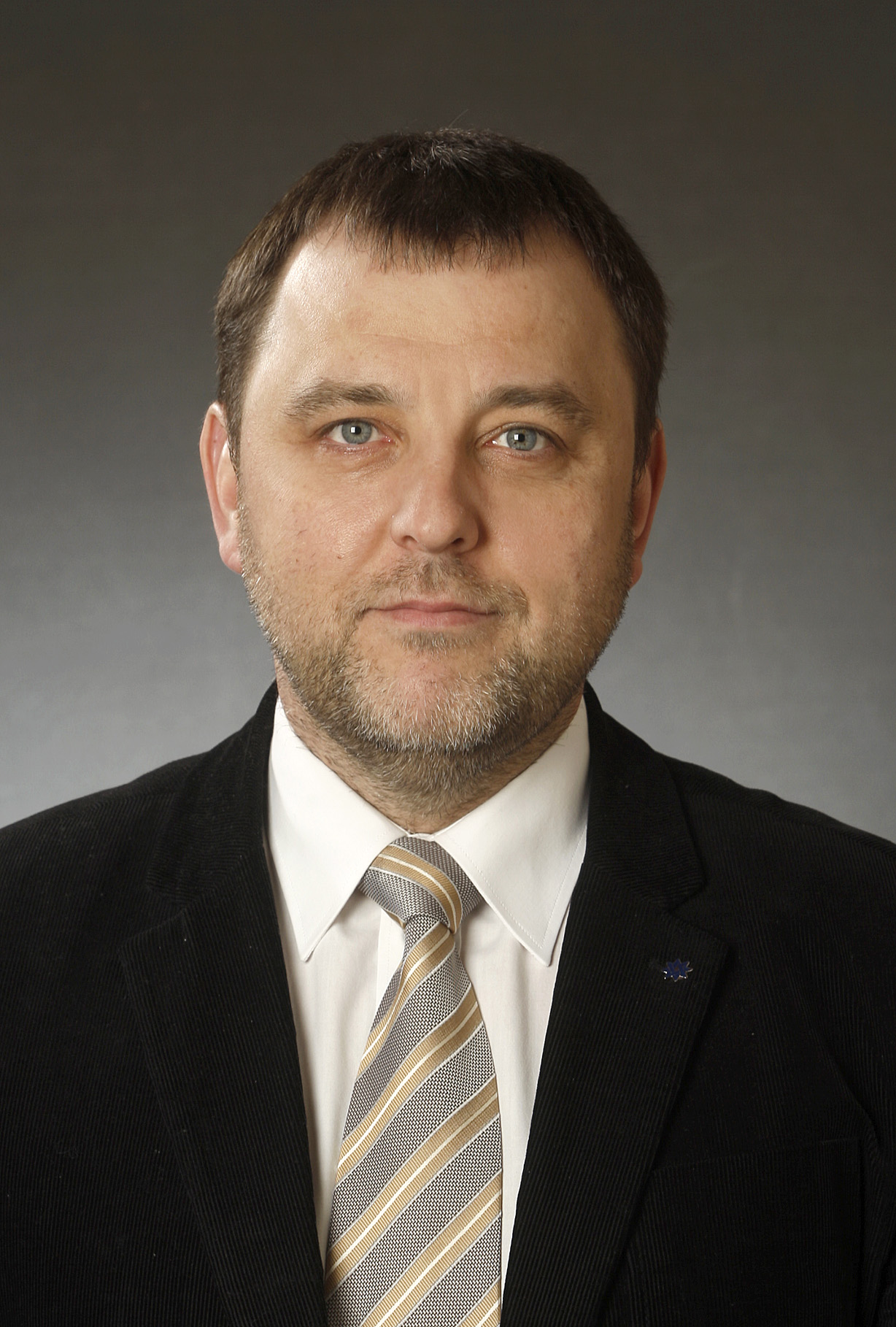

Minister of Finance
- In office 9 April 2015 – 12 June 2017
- Prime Minister: Taavi Rõivas; Jüri Ratas
- Preceded by: Maris Lauri
- Succeeded by: Toomas Tõniste

Personal details
- Born: 14 July 1969 (age 57) Tallinn, then part of Estonian SSR, Soviet Union
- Party: Isamaa
- Education: Tallinn University of Technology
- Website: Official website

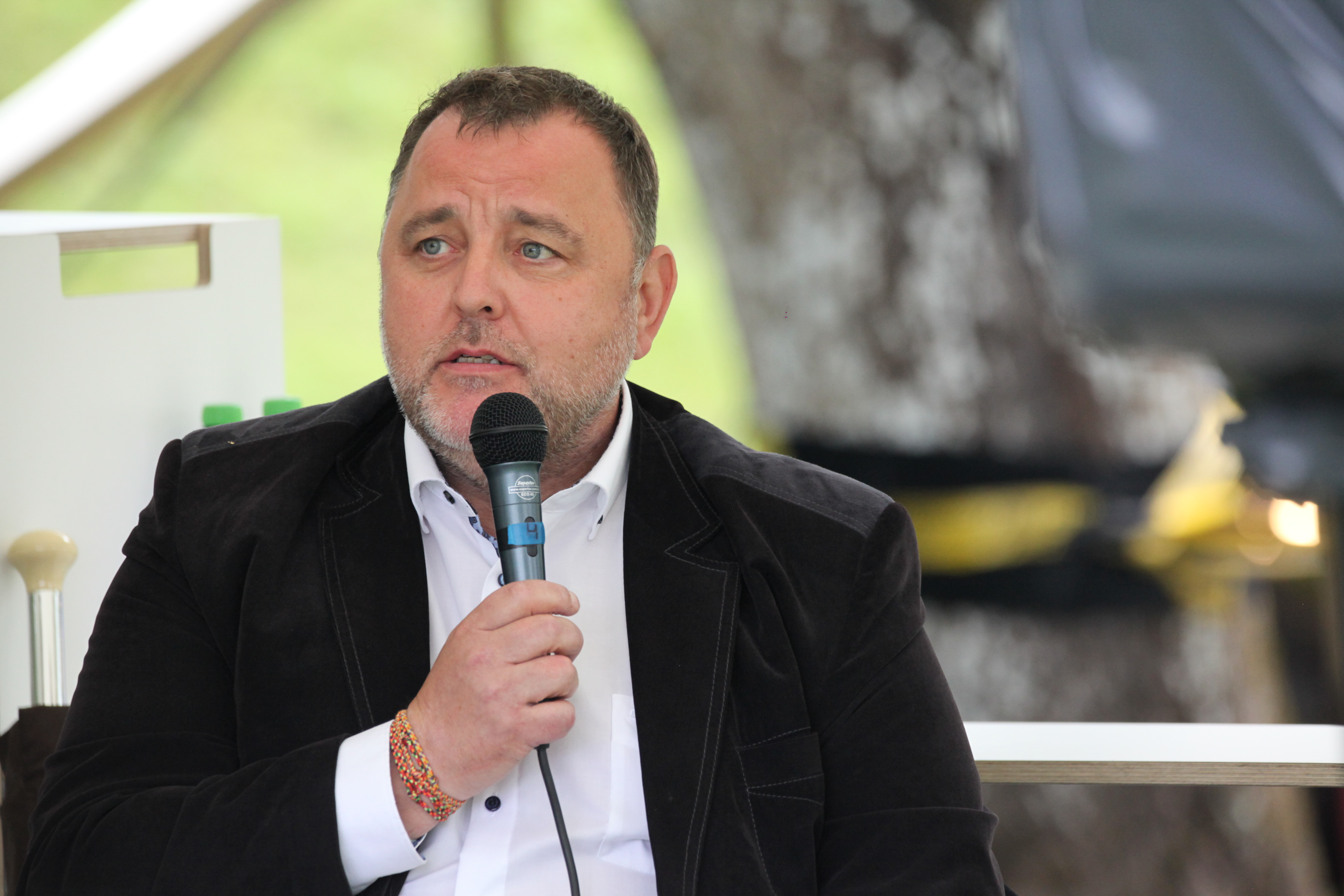
Sven Sester at the Opinion Festival 2021 in Paide, Estonia

Sven Sester (born 14 July 1969) is an Estonian politician and former Minister of Finance.

== Early life ==
Sester was born on 14 July 1969 in Tallinn, Estonia. After graduating from high school in 1987, he studied Economics and Information Technology at the Tallinn University of Technology.

== Political career ==
In 1999, Sester joined Pro Patria and Res Publica Union. From 2002 to 2003, he was deputy chairman of the financial committee in Tallinn city council. From 2003 to 2007, as a member of Riigikogu he was deputy chairman of the economic affairs committee. In 2009 he worked in the economic affairs committee and then became chairman of the financial committee of parliament. He serves as a board member of his party.

In 2015 parliamentary election, Sester lost his seat in the parliament. There was confusion over the results, as after the initial vote count, fellow IRL candidate Viktoria Ladõnskaja was ahead Sester by one vote, but the recount put Sester ahead by one vote. Ladõnskaja asked for a second recount, which ended up with 1,393 votes for Ladõnskaja and 1,392 for Sester.

On April 9, 2015, Sester was nominated as Minister of Finance in Taavi Rõivas' second cabinet.

== Other activities ==
- European Bank for Reconstruction and Development (EBRD), Ex-Officio Alternate Member of the Board of Governors (2015-2017)

Political offices
Preceded by Maris Lauri	Minister of Finance; 2015–2017	Succeeded by Toomas Tõniste
