= Mihhail Korb =

Estonian politician

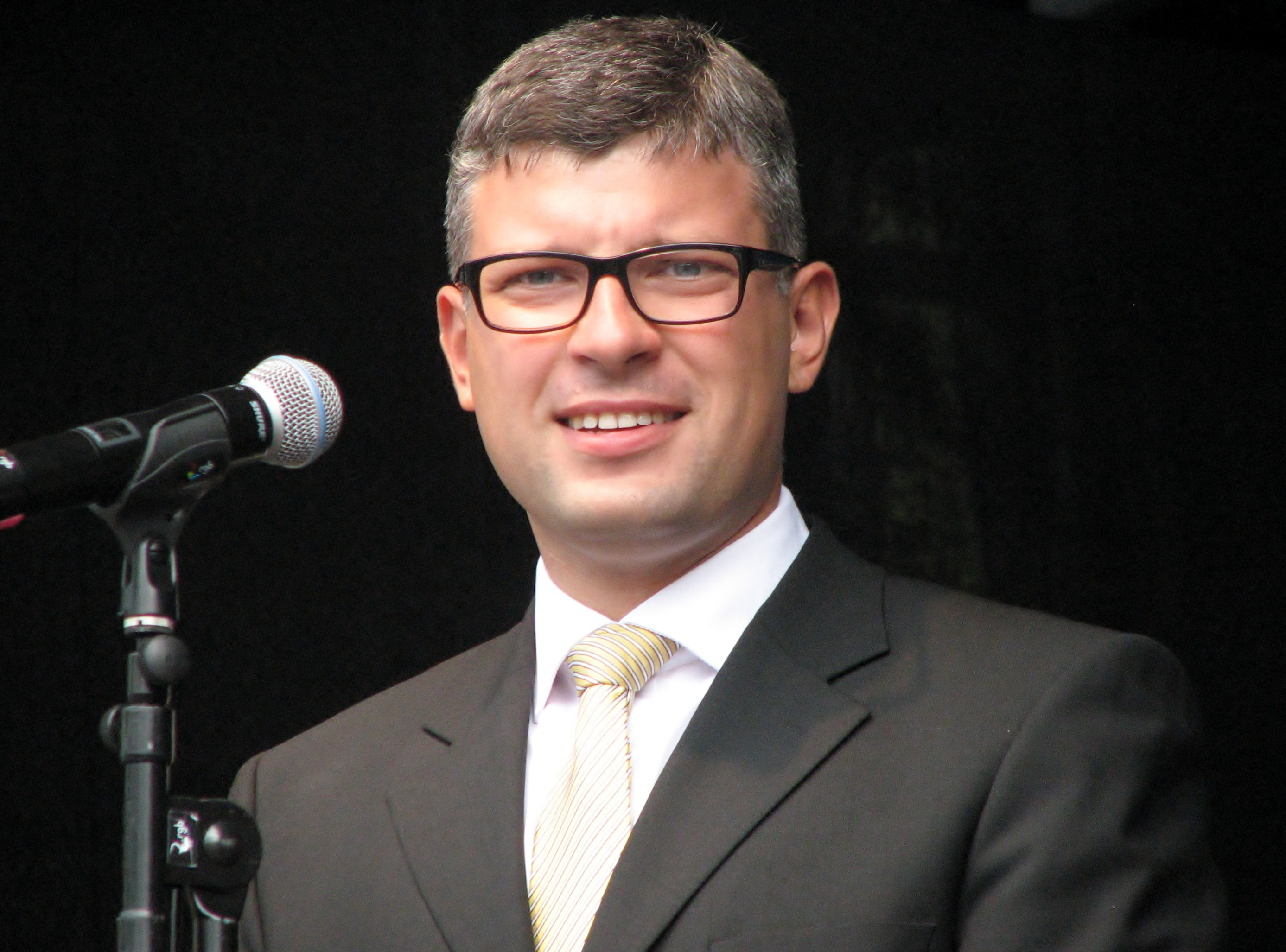
Mihhail Korb in 2012

Mihhail Korb (born on 3 August 1980 Pärnu) is an Estonian politician. He served as member of XIV Riigikogu. Since 2002 he has belonged to the Estonian Centre Party.

Between 2016 and 2017 he was Minister of Public Administration (Estonian: Eesti riigihalduse minister).

He was a member of the XII and XIII Riigikogu.

== Career ==
- 2016-2017 - Minister of Public Administration
- 06.2014–... Riigikogu MP
- 10.2011–06.2014 Tallinn Old City (Tallinn's Borough) District Elder/Chief Executive
- 12.2009–10.2011 Kristiine (Tallinn's Borough) District Elder/Chief Executive
- 12.2005–10.2009 Kristiine (Tallinn's Borough) District Elder/Chief Executive
- 03.2004–11.2005 Mustamäe (Tallinn's Borough) FP&A Specialist
