= Vladimir Velman =

Estonian politician and journalist

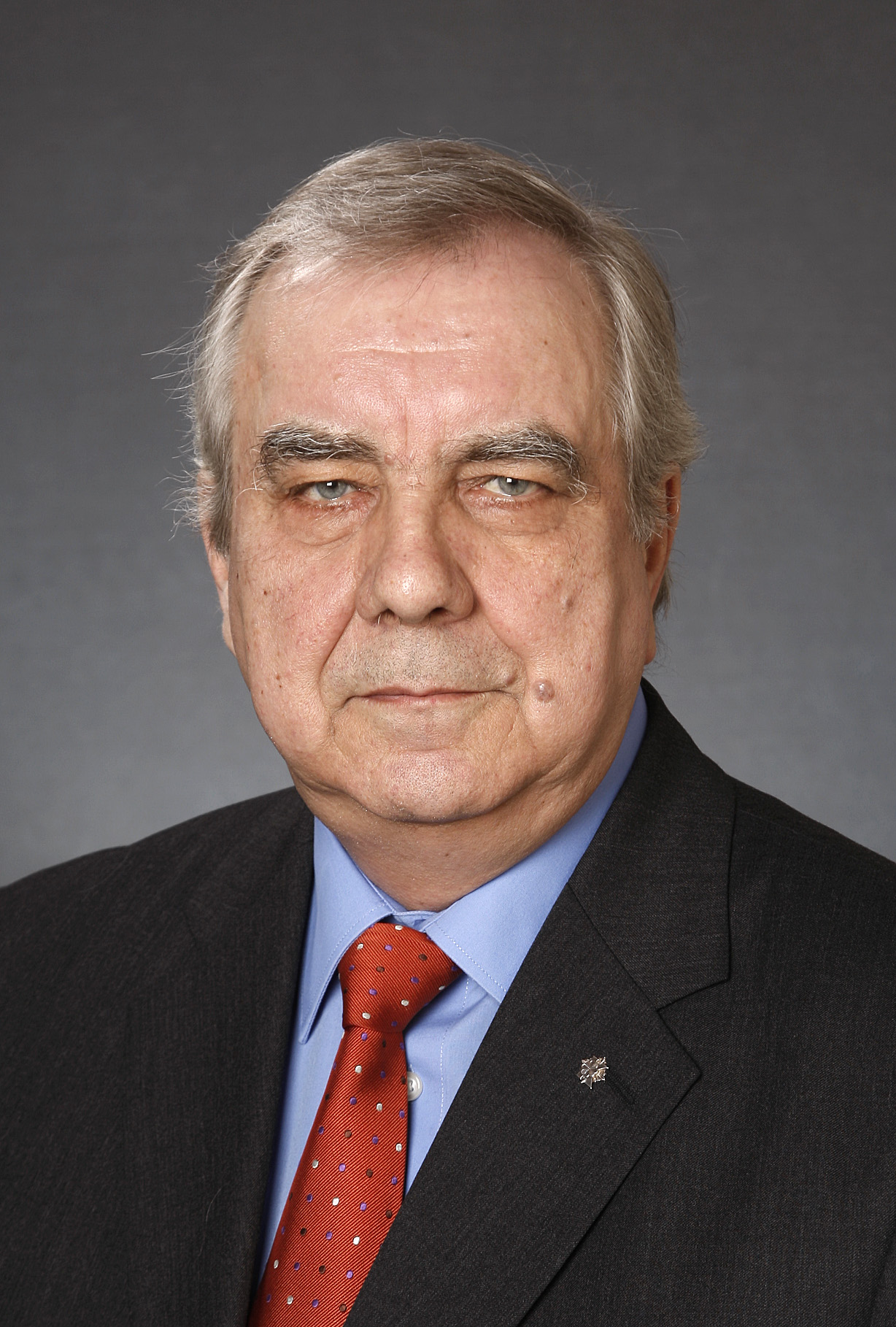
Vladimir Velman

Vladimir Velman (born 25 September 1945 in Tallinn) is an Estonian politician and journalist. He has been a member of the VIII, IX, X, XI, XII, XIII Riigikogu.

Since 1994 he has been a member of the Estonian Centre Party.
