= Olga Sõtnik =

Estonian politician

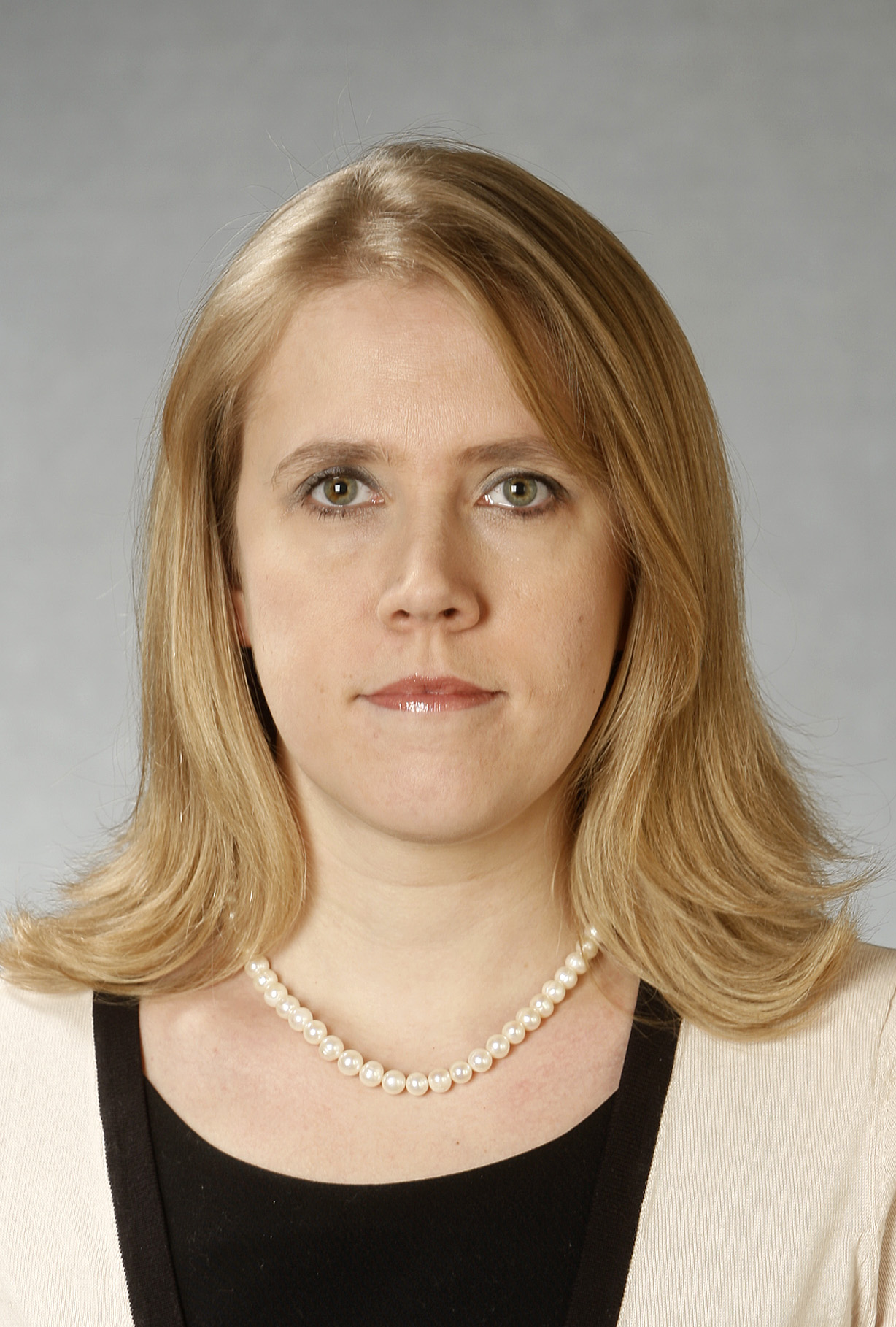
Olga Sõtnik

Olga Sõtnik (born 2 December 1980 in Tallinn) is an Estonian civil servant and politician. She has been member of XI and XII Riigikogu.

She is a member of Estonian Centre Party.
