= Helir-Valdor Seeder =

Estonian politician (born 1964)

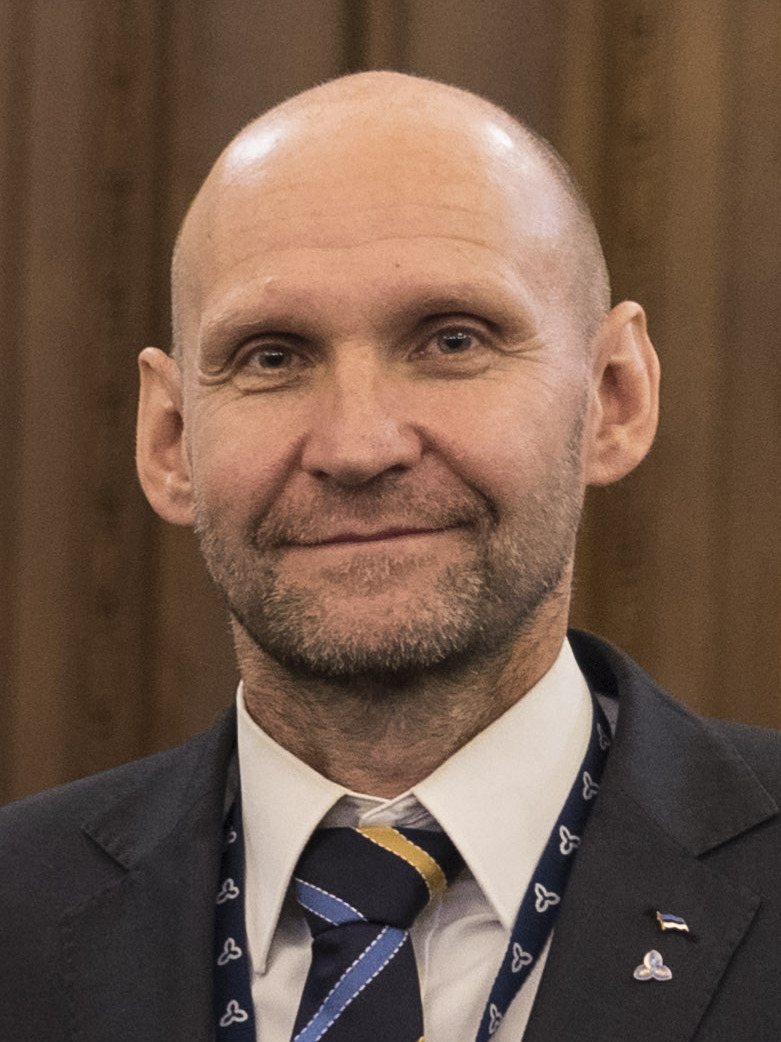
- Seeder in 2016

Leader of the Isamaa
- In office 13 May 2017 – 11 May 2023
- Preceded by: Margus Tsahkna
- Succeeded by: Urmas Reinsalu

Minister of Agriculture
- In office 6 April 2007 – 26 March 2014
- Prime Minister: Andrus Ansip
- Preceded by: Ester Tuiksoo
- Succeeded by: Ivari Padar

Personal details
- Born: 7 September 1964 (age 62) Tallinn, Estonia
- Party: Isamaa
- Education: Estonian University of Life Sciences

Helir-Valdor Seeder (born 7 September 1964) is an Estonian politician. He is a member of the parliament, former chairman of the Isamaa and served as Minister of Agriculture from 2007 to 2014. Seeder has a master's degree in economics from the Estonian University of Life Sciences.

On 13 May 2017 Seeder was elected the chairman of the Pro Patria and Res Publica Union (later renamed Isamaa).

Political offices
| Preceded by ? | Governor of Viljandi County; 1993–2003 | Succeeded by Kalle Küttis |
| Preceded by Ester Tuiksoo | Minister of Agriculture; 2007–2014 | Succeeded by Ivari Padar |
