= Kajar Lember =

Estonian politician (born 1976)

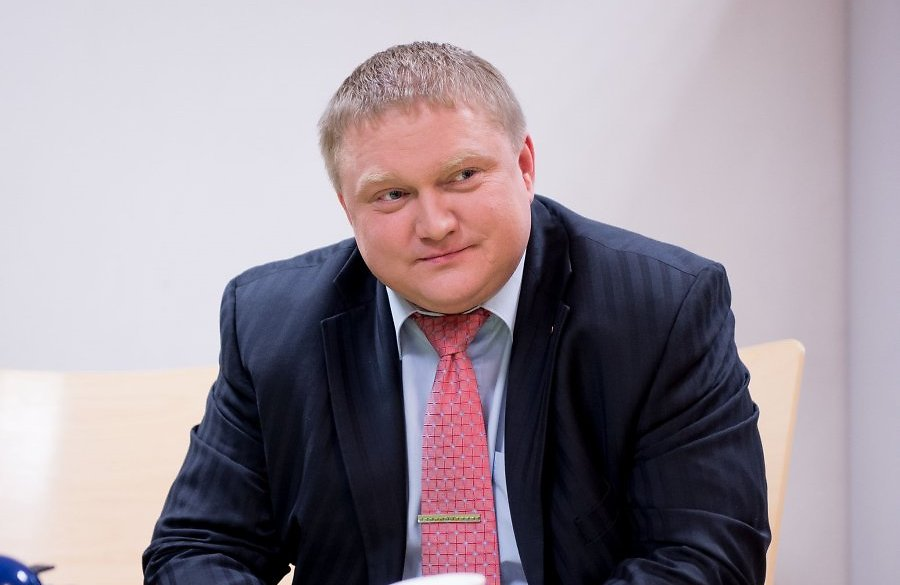
Kajar Lember in 2014

Kajar Lember (born 16 September 1976 in Kuressaare) is an Estonian politician. He has been member of XII Riigikogu.

He is a member of Estonian Social Democratic Party.
