= Indrek Raudne =

Estonian entrepreneur and politician

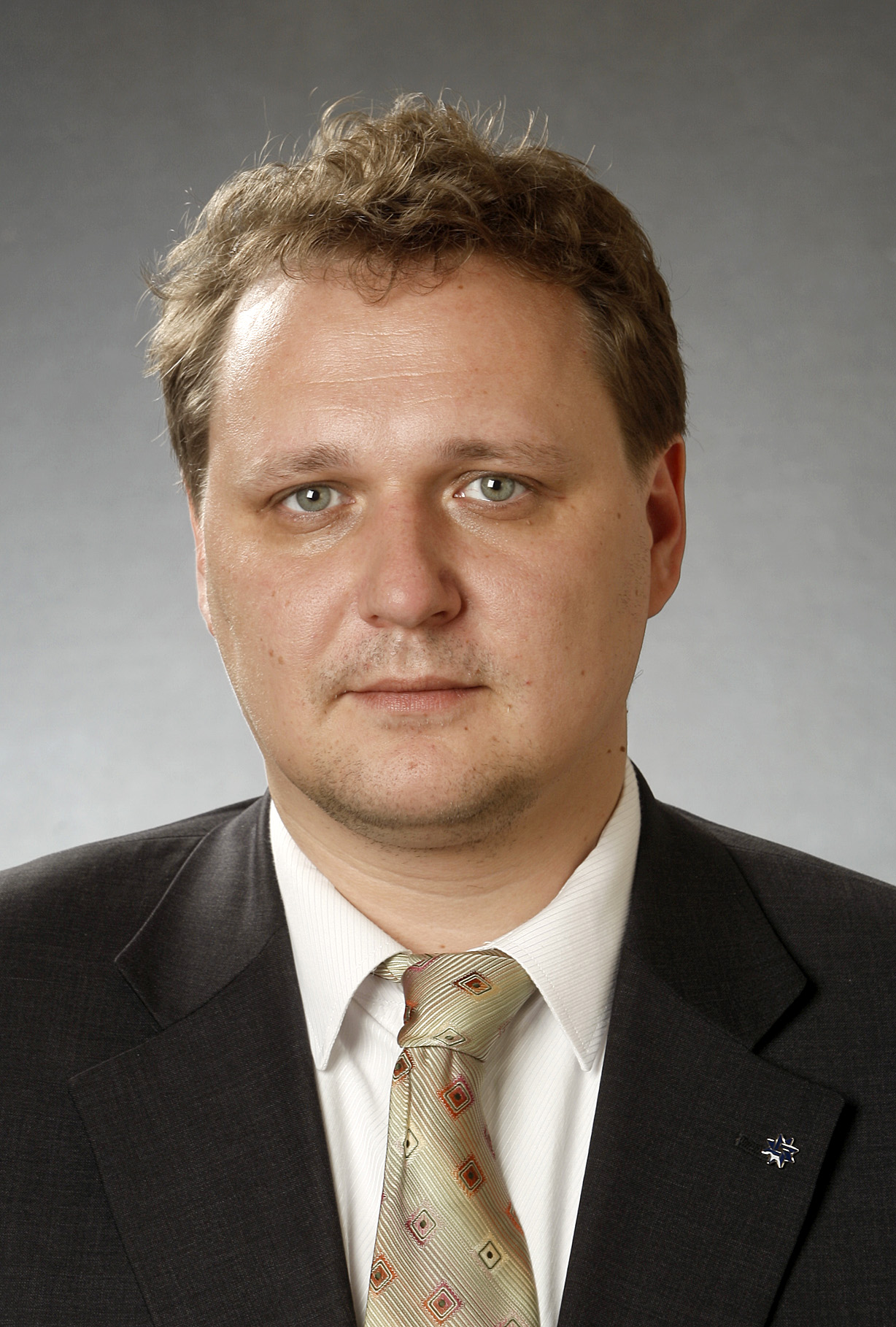
Indrek Raudne

Indrek Raudne (born 18 December 1975 in Tallinn) is an Estonian entrepreneur and politician. He has been a member of X and XII Riigikogu.

He is a member of party Pro Patria and Res Publica Union (nowadays party Isamaa).
