= Nelli Privalova =

Estonian politician

Nelli Privalova (born 7 February 1945 in Tallinn) is an Estonian journalist and politician. She has been member of IX, X and XI Riigikogu.

She is a member of Estonian Centre Party.
