= Ivari Padar =

Estonian politician (born 1965)

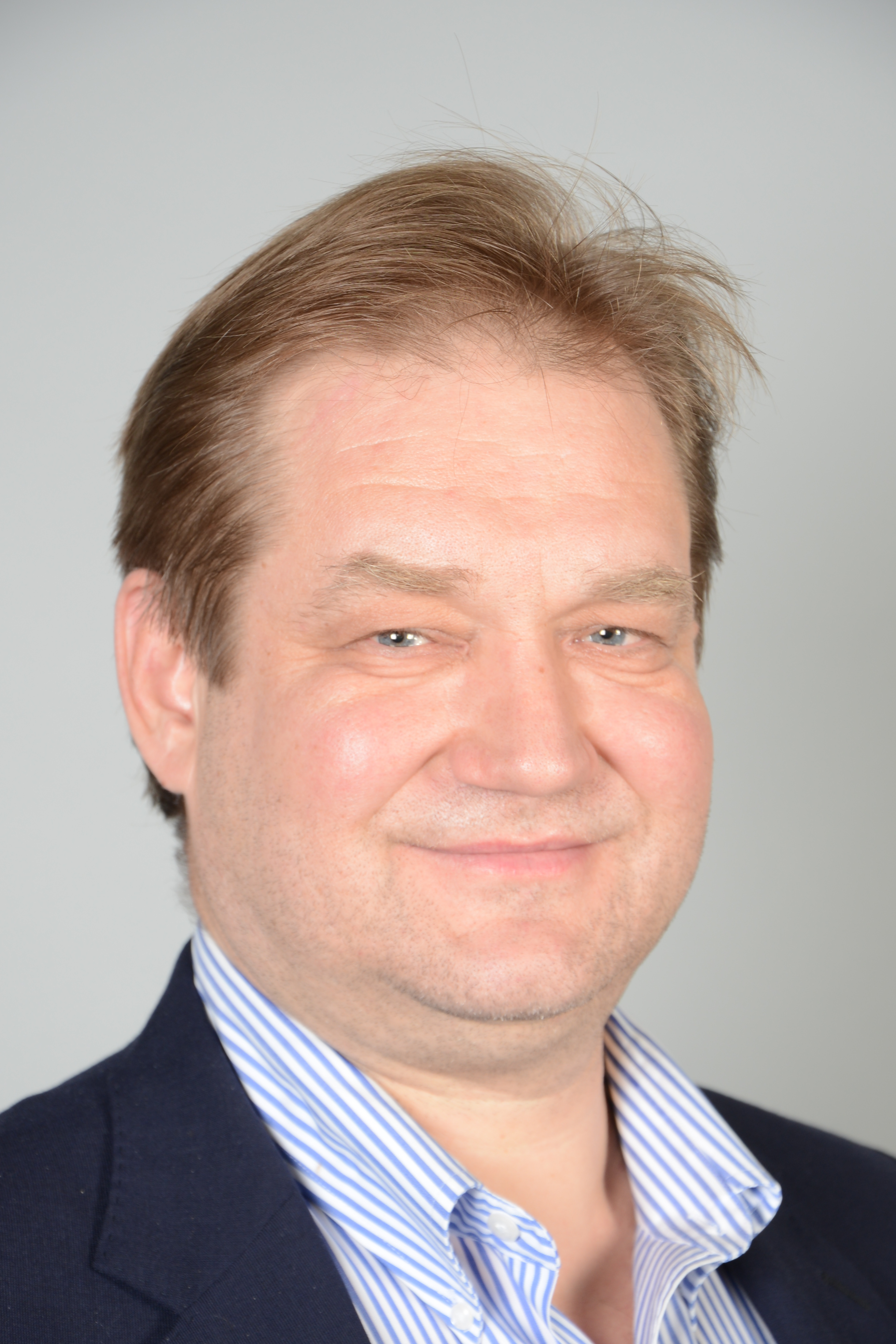

Member of the European Parliament for Estonia
- In office 7 June 2009 – 6 April 2014
- In office 6 November 2017 – 3 April 2019
- Preceded by: Marju Lauristin

Minister of Agriculture
- In office 7 April 2014 – 9 April 2015
- Prime Minister: Taavi Rõivas
- Preceded by: Helir-Valdor Seeder
- Succeeded by: Urmas Kruuse (rural affairs)

Minister of Finance
- In office 5 April 2007 – 21 May 2009
- Prime Minister: Andrus Ansip
- Preceded by: Aivar Sõerd
- Succeeded by: Jürgen Ligi

Minister of Agriculture
- In office 25 March 1999 – 28 January 2002
- Prime Minister: Mart Laar
- Preceded by: Andres Varik
- Succeeded by: Jaanus Marrandi

Personal details
- Born: 12 March 1965 (age 61) Navi, then part of Estonian SSR, Soviet Union
- Party: Social Democratic Party
- Spouse: Kristel Padar
- Children: 2 (from a previous marriage)
- Education: University of Tartu

Ivari Padar (born 12 March 1965) is an Estonian-Võro politician. He is a former Minister of Finance, Minister of Agriculture and chairman of the Estonian Social Democratic Party.

Padar was born in Navi, Võru Parish, Võru. He was Deputy Mayor of Võru from 1993 to 1994, Executive Chairman of the Võru Farmers Union from 1994 to 1995, and Assistant to the Chancellor at the Finance Ministry from 1995 to 1997. He was Minister of Agriculture from 1999 to 2002, Chairman of Võru City Council from 2002 to 2005, and a member of the X, XI, XIII and XIV Riigikogu. In April 2007 he became Minister of Finance. He led the Social Democratic Party from 2003 to 2009.

Padar was a Member of the European Parliament for Estonia from 2009 until 2014 and from 2017 until 2019. In parliament, he served on the Committee on Economic and Monetary Affairs (2009-2014) and the Committee on Civil Liberties, Justice and Home Affairs (2017-2019).

In addition to his political work, Padar is a member of the Reconciliation of European Histories Group.

== Personal ==
Judoka Martin Padar is Ivari Padar's cousin.

== See also ==
- Taavi Rõivas' cabinet
- Andrus Ansip's second cabinet

Political offices
Preceded by Andres Varik	Minister of Agriculture; 1999–2002	Succeeded by Jaanus Marrandi
Preceded by Aivar Sõerd	Minister of Finance; 2007–2009	Succeeded by Jürgen Ligi
Preceded by Helir-Valdor Seeder	Minister of Agriculture; 2014–2015	Succeeded by Urmas Kruuse
