= Arto Aas =

Estonian politician (born 1980)

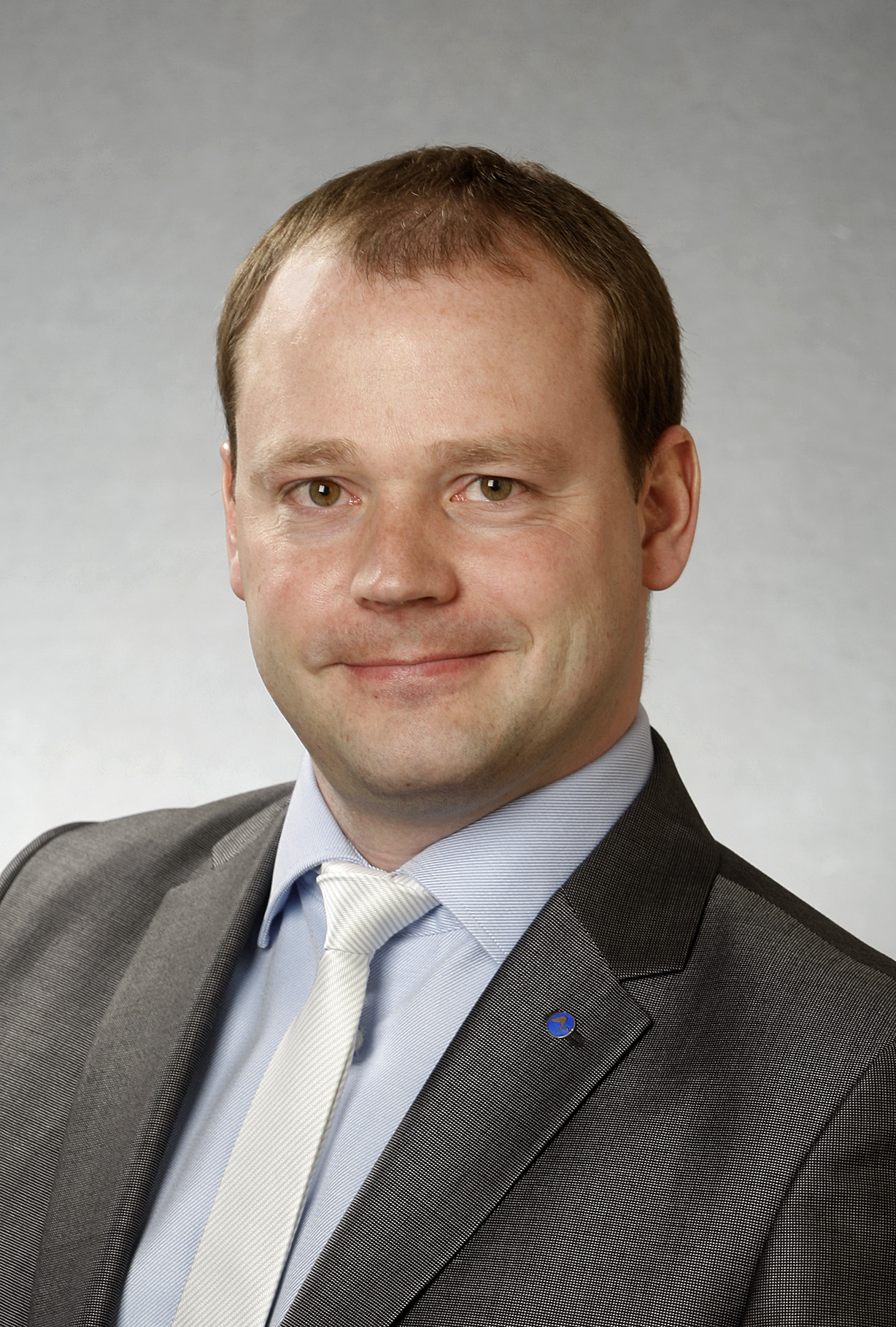

Minister of Public Administration
- In office 9 April 2015 – 23 November 2016
- Prime Minister: Taavi Rõivas
- Preceded by: Maris Lauri (as Minister of Finance)
- Succeeded by: Mihhail Korb

Personal details
- Born: 9 June 1980 (age 46) Tallinn, then part of Estonian SSR, Soviet Union
- Party: Reform Party (1998–present)
- Education: Tallinn University of Technology; University of Tartu

Arto Aas (born 9 June 1980) is an Estonian politician who was the Minister of Public Administration from 2015 to 2016.

On 9 April 2015, Aas became the Minister of Public Administration in Taavi Rõivas' second cabinet.

Political offices
Preceded by Maris Lauri as Minister of Finance	Minister of Public Administration; 2015–2016	Succeeded by Mihhail Korb
