= Maria Jufereva-Skuratovski =

Estonian politician and journalist

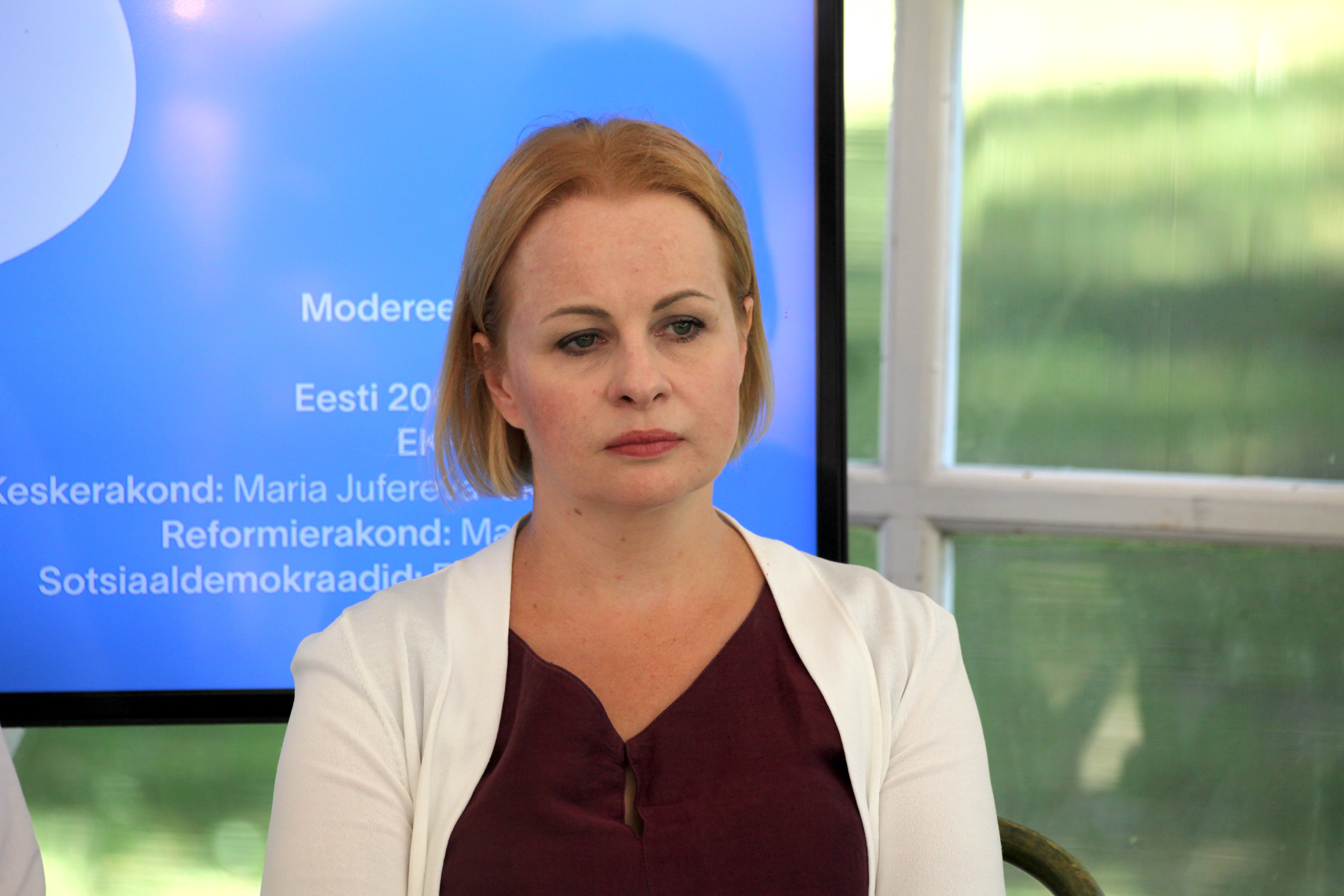

Member of the XV Riigikogu
- Incumbent
- Assumed office 10 April 2023

Member of the XIV Riigikogu
- In office 4 April 2019 – 23 February 2023

Member of the Tallinn City Council
- In office 2017–2024

Elder of Lasnamäe District
- In office 2015–2019

Personal details
- Born: 11 October 1979 (age 46) Tallinn, then part of Estonian SSR, Soviet Union
- Party: Estonian Centre Party (2013–2023); Estonian Reform Party (2023–present)
- Education: Tallinn University; University of Tartu; University of Jyväskylä
- Website: https://jufereva.ee

Maria Jufereva-Skuratovski (born 11 October 1979 in Tallinn) is an Estonian journalist and politician, and a member of the XIV and XV Riigikogu.

== Biography ==
Maria Jufereva-Skuratovski graduated from Tallinn Secondary School No. 19. She earned a bachelor's degree in translation and journalism at Tallinn University and a master's degree in journalism at the University of Tartu.

She has worked as a lecturer in media criticism at the University of Tartu and as a media specialist at the Tallinn City Government. She later began doctoral studies in communication at the University of Jyväskylä in Finland, where she completed her PhD.

== Political career ==
Jufereva-Skuratovski entered politics in the 2013 local elections, when she was elected to the Tallinn City Council. She was re-elected to the council in 2017 and 2021. From 2015 to 2019 she served as the district elder of Tallinn's Lasnamäe district.

She was elected to the Riigikogu for the first time in 2019. During the XIV session she served on the Foreign Affairs Committee and the Committee on the Development of Estonian-Language Education. From 2019 to 2023 she headed the Estonian delegation to the Parliamentary Assembly of the Council of Europe.

Re-elected in the 2023 parliamentary elections, she now sits in the Constitutional Committee of the XV Riigikogu and has previously served on the European Union Affairs Committee and the Foreign Affairs Committee.

Her political work focuses on supporting entrepreneurship, reducing bureaucracy and ensuring transparent public communication. She belongs to several parliamentary friendship groups, including the Estonia–Azerbaijan, Estonia–USA and Estonia–Ukraine groups.

From 2013 to 2023 she was a member of the Estonian Centre Party; since 15 November 2023 she has belonged to the Estonian Reform Party.

== Personal life ==
Maria Jufereva-Skuratovski is married and has two children. She speaks Estonian, Russian and English.
