= Evelyn Sepp =

Estonian politician

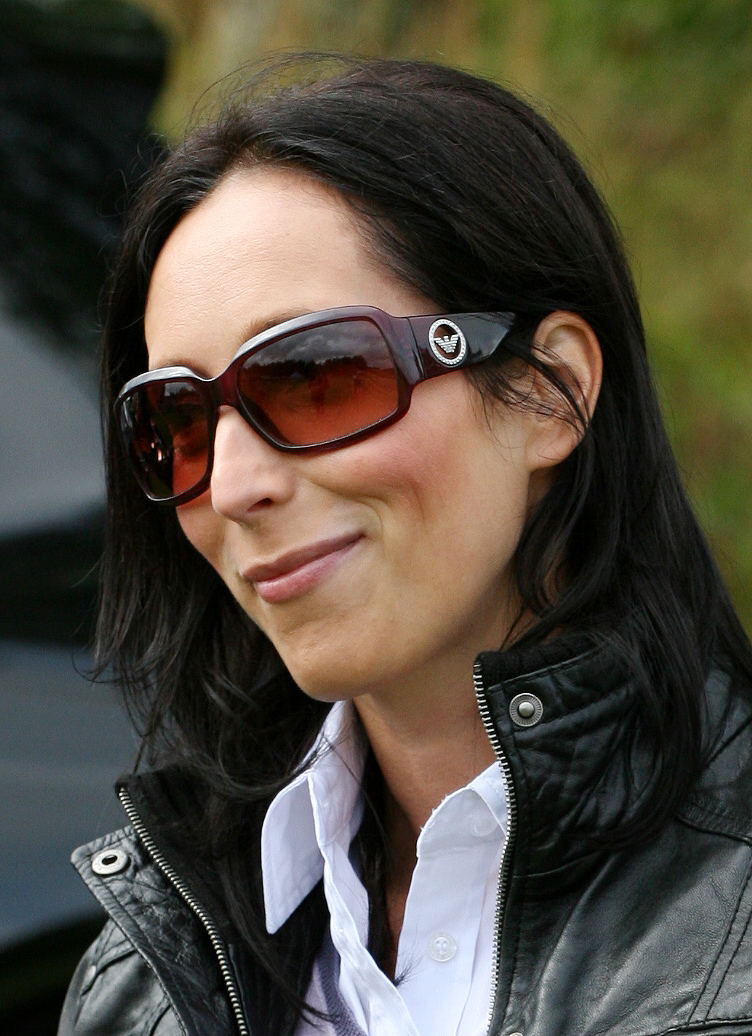
Evelyn Sepp in 2009.

Evelyn Sepp (born 13 July 1972 in Tallinn) is an Estonian sports figure and politician. She has been member of IX, X and XI Riigikogu.

She was a member of Estonian Centre Party until 2014.

In 2023, she was elected as the co-leader of Estonian Greens.
