= Ira Lember =

Estonian writer (1926–2025)

- Born: 21 May 1926; Tallinn, Estonia
- Died: 1 August 2025 (aged 99)

Ira Lember (21 May 1926 – 1 August 2025) was an Estonian writer.

== Early life ==
Lember was born in Tallinn on 21 May 1926. Lember studied at the Tallinn French School.

== Career ==
She became a freelance writer in 1974, and became a member of the Estonian Writers' Union in 1984. Throughout her career she published a number of books, including Jannu (1969), and the 2006 autobiography The Golden Kaleidoscope.

In 2017 she was awarded the Order of the White Star, Fifth Class.

Lember died on 1 August 2025, at the age of 99.
