= Ester Tuiksoo =

Estonian politician (born 1965)

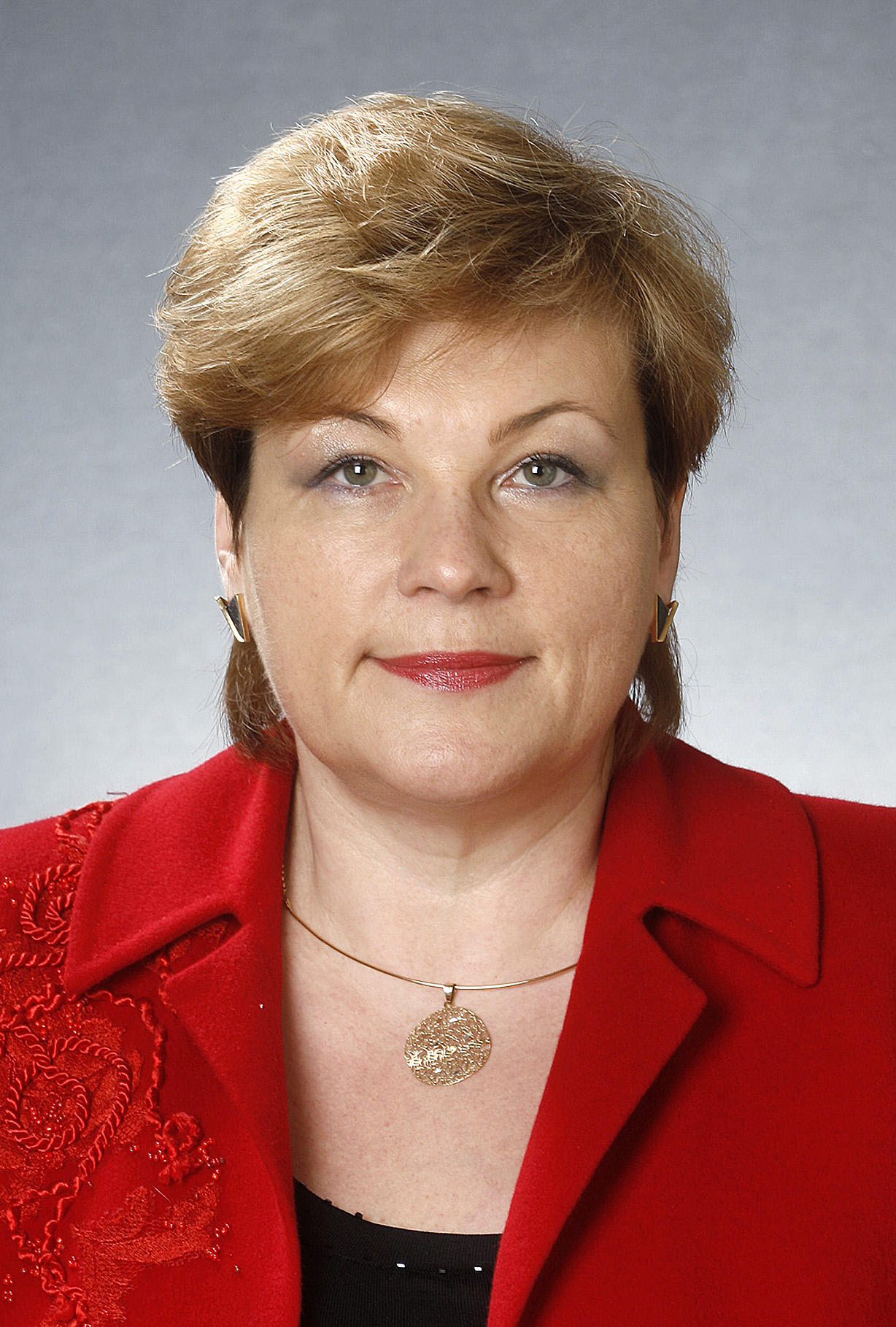
Ester Tuiksoo

Ester Tuiksoo (born 5 March 1965, in Põlva) is an Estonian politician and business executive. She has been a member of the XI and XII Riigikogu, representing the People's Union of Estonia and from 2010, the Estonian Centre Party. From 2004 to 2007 she was Minister of Rural Affairs. Tuiksoo served as an alternate for the Parliamentary Assembly of the Council of Europe from 2007 to 2015 and was a member of the Alliance of Liberals and Democrats for Europe Party.

She graduated from the University of Tartu in 1983 with a degree in commercial economics.

== Legal Issues ==
Tuiksoo was convicted in 2014 of accepting bribes in a land swap deal. She was given a three-month suspended sentence and later appealed to the European Human Rights Council and requested a presidential pardon. Both were rejected, she maintains her innocence and has returned to party politics since.
