= Viktoria Ladõnskaja =

Estonian politician

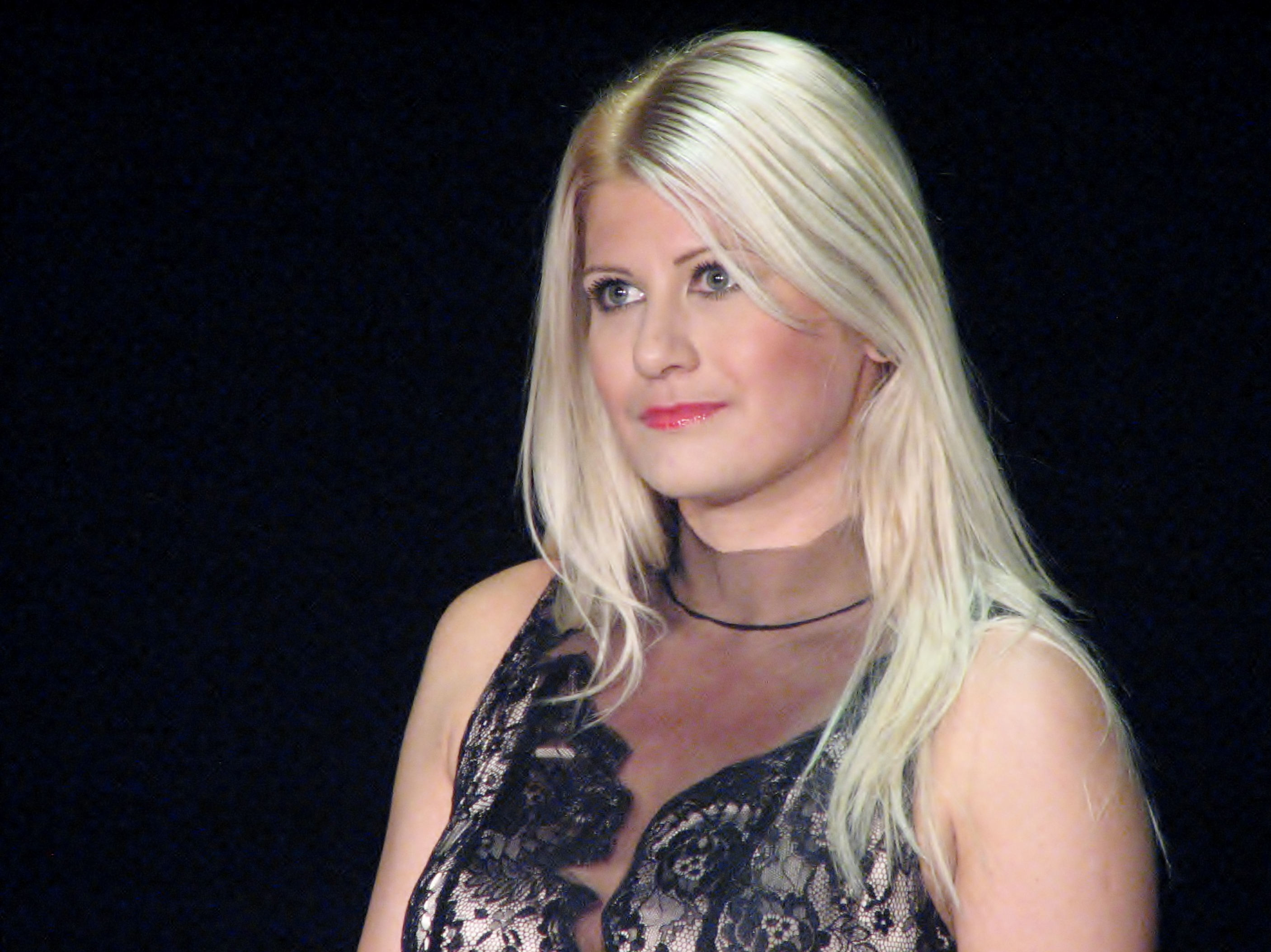
Ladõnskaja in August 2013.

Viktoria Ladõnskaja-Kubits (born 20 July 1981 in Anapa) is an Estonian politician and a member of its parliament, or Riigikogu. She represents the Tallinn constituency of Kesklinn, Lasnamäe and Pirita as a member of the Isamaa party. Ladõnskaja was elected to the Riigikogu in the 2015 election with 1,393 personal votes. Before starting her career in politics, Ladõnskaja worked as a freelance journalist and writer.
