= Tõnis Kõiv =

Estonian politician and lawyer (born 1970)

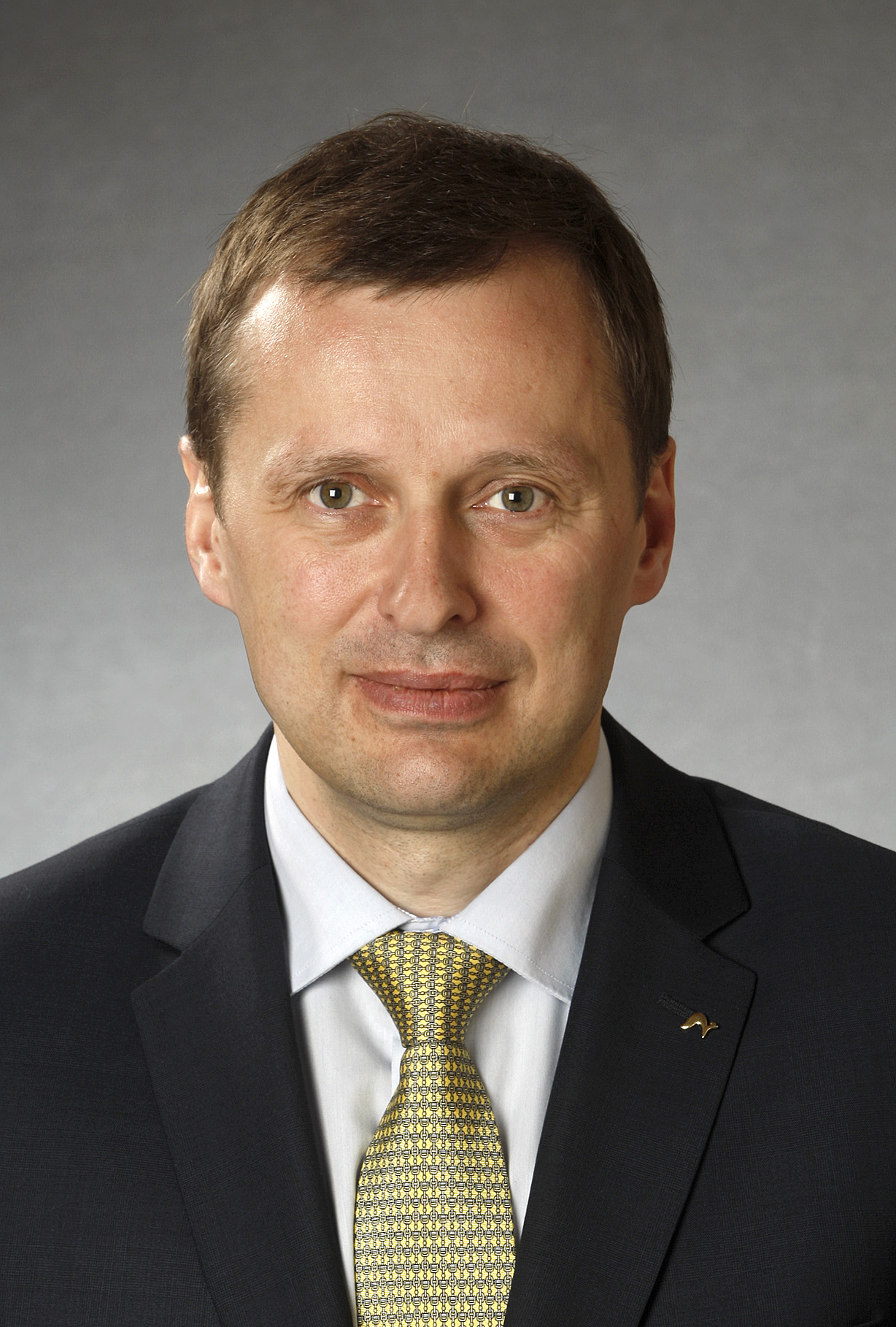
Tõnis Kõiv in 2011

Tõnis Kõiv (born 29 October 1970, in Paide) is an Estonian politician and lawyer who represented the Estonian Reform Party in the Riigikogu from 2005 to 2015.

== Education ==
Kõiv graduated from Koeru Secondary School in 1989 and from the Faculty of Law of the University of Tartu in 1995. He studied on Master's degree level in the University of Tartu's European University in 2000-2003. Finished the Data Protection Officer at Expert level course in TalTech, Dec 2018.

== Career ==
Kõiv worked as a driver on Koeru state farm from 1989 to 1993, as a lawyer in Paide Piimakombinaat AS from 1993 to 1996, as well as the mayor of Paide from 1996 to 2004. He also was the Managing Director of OÜ Agenor from 2004 to 2005, worked as a lawyer at YourOffice from 2016 to 2017. Worked as the Estonian Reform Party secretary general since February 7th 2017 to March 9th 2018. Works at Youroffice from 2018 April as a lawyer.

== Political career ==
Kõiv has been a member of the Estonian Reform Party since 4 June 1996. He was a member of the Reform Party's Management Board on and off again from 1999 to 2013. Kõiv, a member of the Reform Party elected in 2013, did not stand.

He was a member Riigikogu elected from Järva and Viljandi counties from 2005 to 2015. He stood for reelection in 2015, but was not reelected.

Kõiv was, at various points, the chairman of the Environment Committee, Deputy Chairman of the State Audit Office, and currently chair of the Estonian delegation to the IPU (International Union of Interparliamentary Allies), chairman of the Estonian-Czech relations Parliamentary Group.

On 10 February 2017, Kõiv was voted the secretary general of the Reform Party, which he began on 1 March 2017. He resigned on 9 March 2018 after Chairman of the Party proposal.

== Social activities ==
Kõiv has been a member of the Committee of the Regions of the European Union from 2003 to 2004, chairman of the Association of Estonian Cities from 1999 to 2004, and the chairman of the Association of Local Authorities of Järva County from 1999 to 2002.

He was a founding member of the Paide Chamber of the International Chamber of Commerce, a member of the Board of the State Forest Management Center, a member of the Council of AS Teede Tehnokeskus and a member of the Tallinn Rotary Club. He is the president of international networking organisation (BNI) North Star Tallinn chapter.

== Awards ==
- 2003: Järva County Order of Honour
