= Keit Pentus-Rosimannus =

Estonian politician

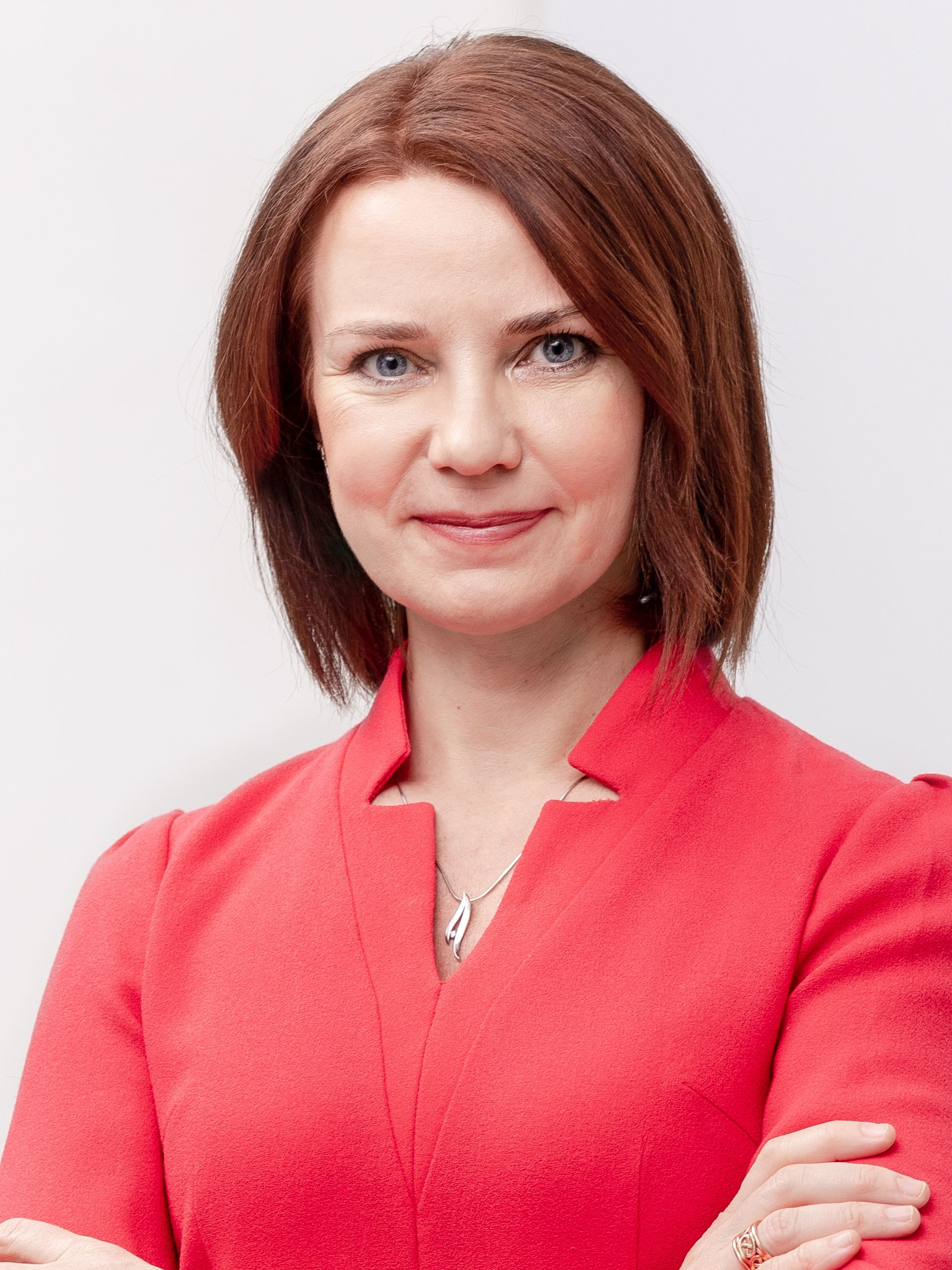

Member of the European Court of Auditors for Estonia
- Incumbent
- Assumed office 1 January 2023
- President: Tony Murphy
- Preceded by: Juhan Parts

Minister of Finance
- In office 26 January 2021 – 19 October 2022
- Prime Minister: Kaja Kallas
- Preceded by: Martin Helme
- Succeeded by: Annely Akkermann

Minister of Foreign Affairs
- In office 17 November 2014 – 1 July 2015
- Prime Minister: Taavi Rõivas
- Preceded by: Urmas Paet
- Succeeded by: Marina Kaljurand

Minister of the Environment
- In office 6 April 2011 – 17 November 2014
- Prime Minister: Andrus Ansip Taavi Rõivas
- Preceded by: Jaanus Tamkivi
- Succeeded by: Mati Raidma

Personal details
- Born: 3 March 1976 (age 50) Tallinn, then part of Estonian SSR, Soviet Union
- Party: Reform Party
- Education: Tallinn University; University of Tartu

Keit Pentus-Rosimannus (born 3 March 1976) is an Estonian politician who served as Minister of Finance in the government of Prime Minister Kaja Kallas between 26 January 2021 and 19 October 2022. She is also the vice-chairwoman of the biggest parliament party, the Reform Party, and former chairwoman of its parliamentary faction.

Pentus-Rosimannus previously served as Minister of Foreign Affairs from 2014 to 2015 and as Minister of the Environment from 2011 to 2014.

== Early life and education ==
Pentus-Rosimannus studied piano in Tallinn Musical High School and in Tallinn Baccalaureate Private School (today’s University Nord), which she graduated from in 1995 with honours. In 2000 Pentus-Rosimannus graduated from Tallinn Pedagogical University (today’s Tallinn University) majoring in public administration and European Union relations. Pentus continued her MA studies in political science in University of Tartu, but did not complete her degree.

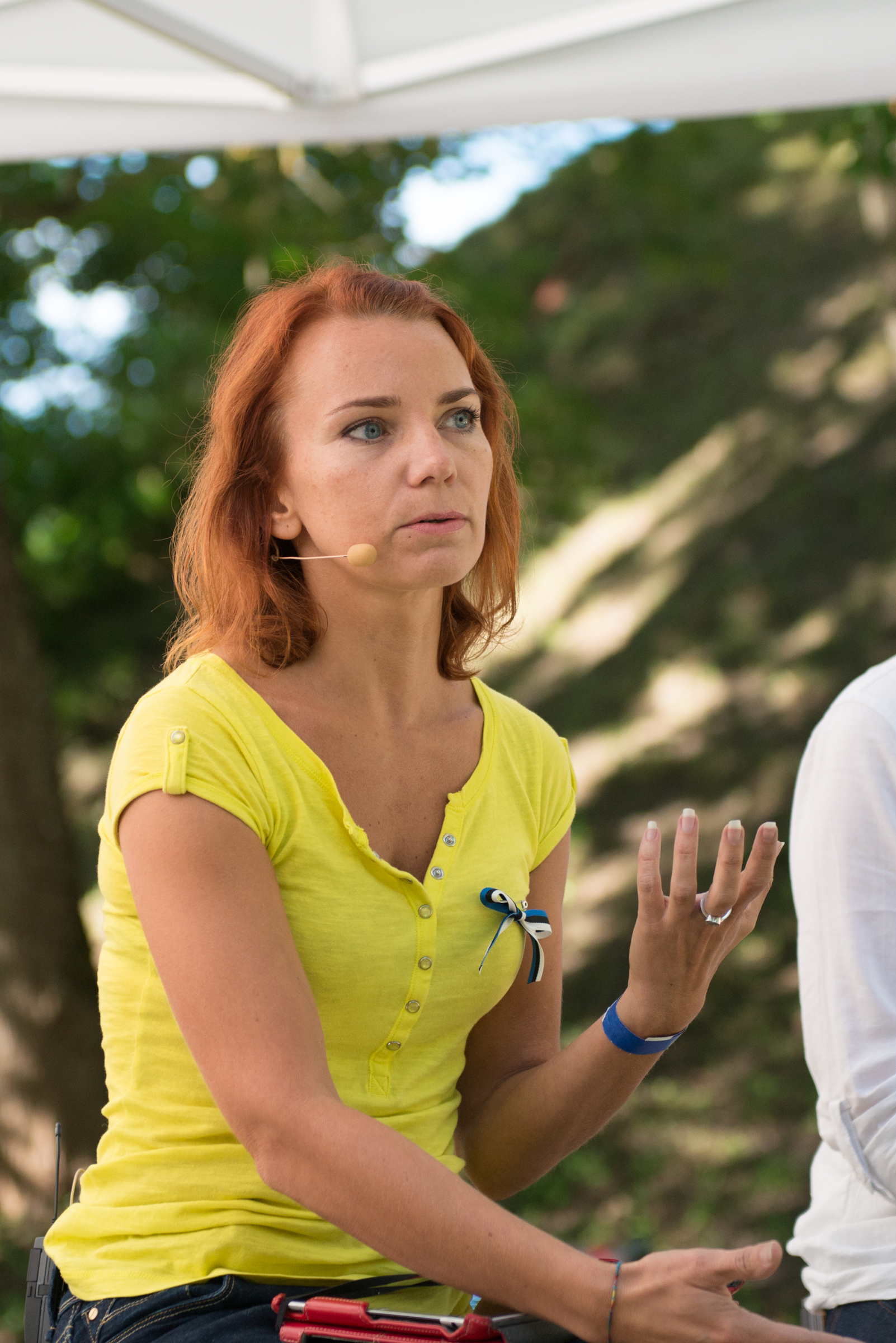
Keit Pentus-Rosimannus in Arvamusfestival (2014).

== Political career ==
Pentus-Rosimannus' first contact with the Reform Party took place in 1996 when she was hired as an election manager during her second year in university. In 1997 Rosimannus and Kristen Michal (later secretary-general of Reform party) established a club for young politicians which now has 4000 members.

Pentus-Rosimannus has been a member of the Reform Party since 1998.

Pentus-Rosimannus has worked as a political advisor in Ministry of Justice, Ministry of Social Affairs and Ministry of Foreign Affairs. In 2003, Pentus was offered a position of district governor of central Tallinn. She managed the district for 2 years, during which she initiated a thematic plan for high-rise buildings, a comprehensive plan aimed at the protection of the built-up area of cultural and environmental value, discussions on the future of the Old Town; she also managed to tidy up Musumägi, arranged the lighting of Schnell Park and Lembitu Park, helped modernize several kindergartens in Tallinn and summoned the round tables of the headmasters of schools, heads of kindergartens as well as apartment associations.

After the breakup of the Tallinn city coalition in 2005, Pentus-Rosimannus became the head of Prime Minister Andrus Ansip's office.

In 2007 Pentus-Rosimannus ran for parliament, receiving 7049 votes. During the term, she served as chairman of the parliamentary faction of Reform Party, and was a member of the Finance Committee.

Pentus-Rosimannus is also a member of the parliamentary groups of Great Britain, USA, China, Ukraine, Azerbaijan, Slovakia, Germany and Turkey. She is a council member of the State Real Estate PLC, council member of the Educational and Conference Centre of Christian Culture and Ethical Values of Tallinn Dome Church and a council member of the Support Union of Grandparents.

In the 2015 election, Pentus-Rosimannus was re-elected for another term with 5,716 votes. She started as the Minister of Foreign Affairs in Taavi Rõivas' second cabinet on 17 November 2014. On 1 July 2015, Pentus-Rosimannus resigned following the Tallinn Circuit Court decision which made her partly liable for debts accumulated by her father's bankrupt company Autorollo.

== Other activities ==
=== European Union organizations ===
- European Investment Bank (EIB), Ex-Officio Member of the Board of Governors (2021–2022)
- European Stability Mechanism (ESM), Member of the Board of Governors (2021–2022)

=== International organizations ===
- European Bank for Reconstruction and Development (EBRD), Ex-Officio Member of the Board of Governors (2021–2022)
- Nordic Investment Bank (NIB), Ex-Officio Member of the Board of Governors (2021–2022)
- Multilateral Investment Guarantee Agency (MIGA), World Bank Group, Ex-Officio Member of the Board of Governors (2021–2022)
- World Bank, Ex-Officio Member of the Board of Governors (2021–2022)

== Personal life ==
Her brother Sten is a racing driver. On 10 August 2012, Pentus married Rain Rosimannus.

== Sources ==
- Keit Pentus at the website of Estonian Parliament

Political offices
| Preceded by Kristen Michal | Governor of Kesklinn; 2003–2005 | Succeeded by Kalev Kallo |
| Preceded by Jaanus Tamkivi | Minister of the Environment; 2011–2014 | Succeeded by Mati Raidma |
| Preceded by Urmas Paet | Minister of Foreign Affairs; 2014–2015 | Succeeded by Marina Kaljurand |
| Preceded by Martin Helme | Minister of Finance; 2021–2022 | Succeeded by Annely Akkermann |
