= Toomas Tõniste =

Estonian sailor and politician

Toomas Tõniste OLY
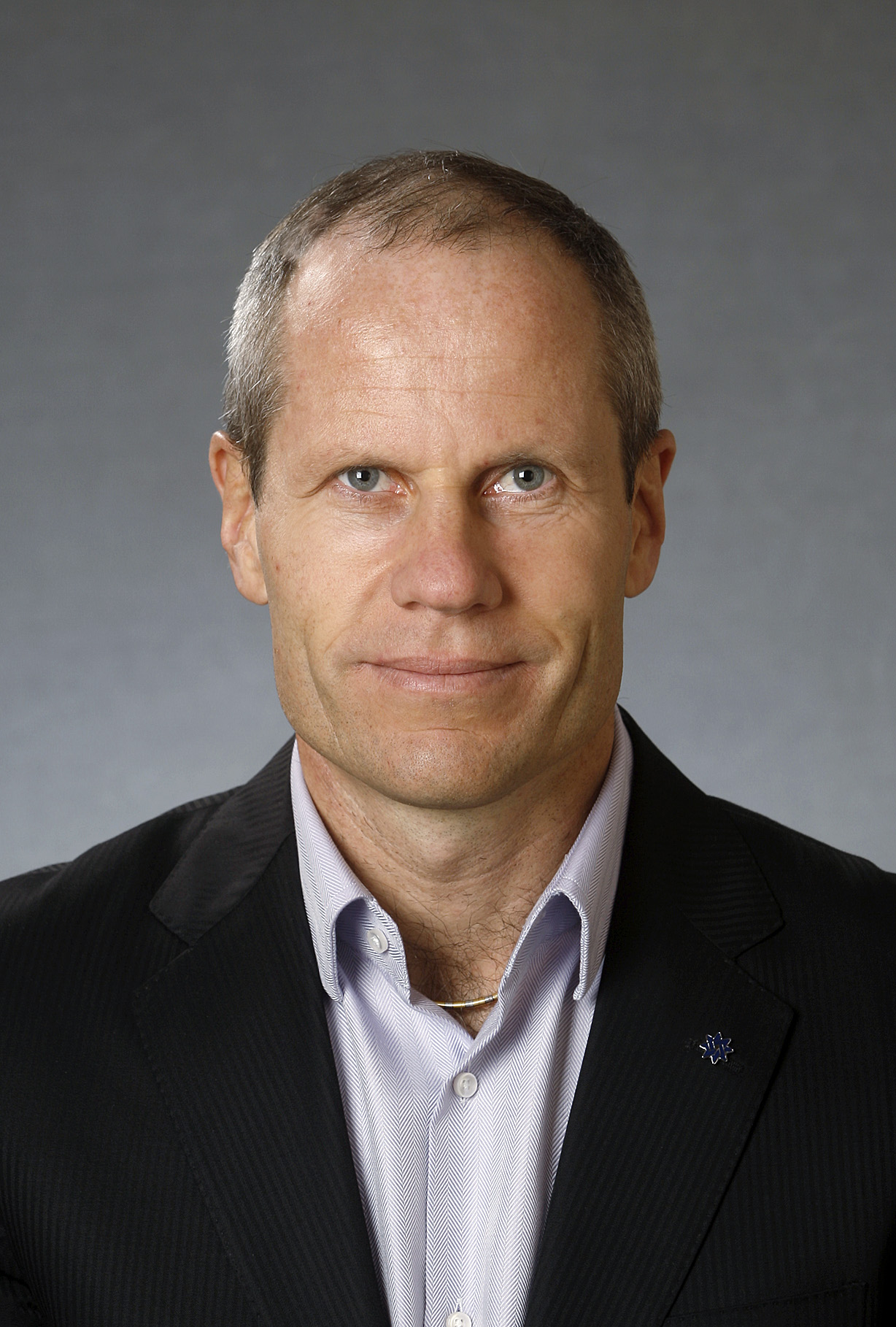

Minister of Finance
- In office 12 June 2017 – 29 April 2019
- Prime Minister: Jüri Ratas
- Preceded by: Sven Sester
- Succeeded by: Martin Helme

Personal details
- Born: 26 April 1967 (age 59) Tallinn, then part of Estonian SSR, Soviet Union
- Party: Pro Patria
- Relatives: Tõnu Tõniste (twin brother)
- Education: Tallinn University
- Sports career
Medal record
Men's sailing
Olympic Games
Representing the Soviet Union
Silver medal – second place	1988 Seoul	470 class
Representing Estonia
Bronze medal – third place	1992 Barcelona	470 class

Toomas Tõniste (born 26 April 1967) is an Estonian sailor and politician, and the former Minister of Finance.

== Career in sports ==
Tõniste competed in four consecutive Summer Olympics, starting in 1988. He won a silver and a bronze medal in the men's 470 class, for the Soviet Union (silver, 1988) and for Estonia (bronze, 1992). He did so with his twin brother Tõnu Tõniste.

== Education ==
Tõniste graduated from Tallinn University.

== Career in politics ==
Between 2007 and 2015, Tõniste was a member of the 11th and 12th Riigikogu (Parliament of Estonia), serving as Chairman of the Committee on Economic Affairs.

On 7 June 2017, Tõniste replaced Sven Sester as Minister of Finance of Estonia.

== Other activities ==
=== European Union organizations ===
- European Investment Bank (EIB), Ex-Officio Member of the Board of Governors
- European Stability Mechanism (ESM), Member of the Board of Governors

=== International organizations ===
- European Bank for Reconstruction and Development (EBRD), Ex-Officio Member of the Board of Governors
- Nordic Investment Bank (NIB), Ex-Officio Member of the Board of Governors
- Multilateral Investment Guarantee Agency (MIGA), World Bank Group, Ex-Officio Member of the Board of Governors
- World Bank, Ex-Officio Member of the Board of Governors

=== Corporate boards ===
- State Forest Management Centre, Member of the Supervisory Board (2008-2011)

Political offices
Preceded by Sven Sester	Minister of Finance; 2017–2019	Succeeded by Martin Helme
