= 11th Riigikogu =

Parliament of Estonia 2007–2011

The 11th Riigikogu was the eleventh legislature of the Estonian Parliament (Riigikogu). The legislature was elected after 2007 election.

== Election results ==
Party	Votes	%	Seats	+/–
Estonian Reform Party	153,044	27.8	31	+12
Estonian Centre Party	143,518	26.1	29	+1
Pro Patria and Res Publica Union	98,347	17.9	19	–16
Social Democratic Party	58,363	10.6	10	+4
Estonian Greens	39,279	7.1	6	New
People's Union of Estonia	39,215	7.1	6	–7
Party of Estonian Christian Democrats	9,456	1.7	0	0
Constitution Party	5,464	1.0	0	0
Estonian Independence Party	1,273	0.2	0	0
Russian Party in Estonia	1,084	0.2	0	0
Estonian Left Party	607	0.1	0	0
Independents	563	0.1	0	0
Invalid/blank votes	5,250	–	–	–
Total	555,463	100	101	0
Registered voters/turnout	897,243	61.9	–	–
Source: VVK

== Officers ==
Speaker of the Riigikogu: Ene Ergma.
