= 12th Riigikogu =

Parliament of Estonia 2011–2015

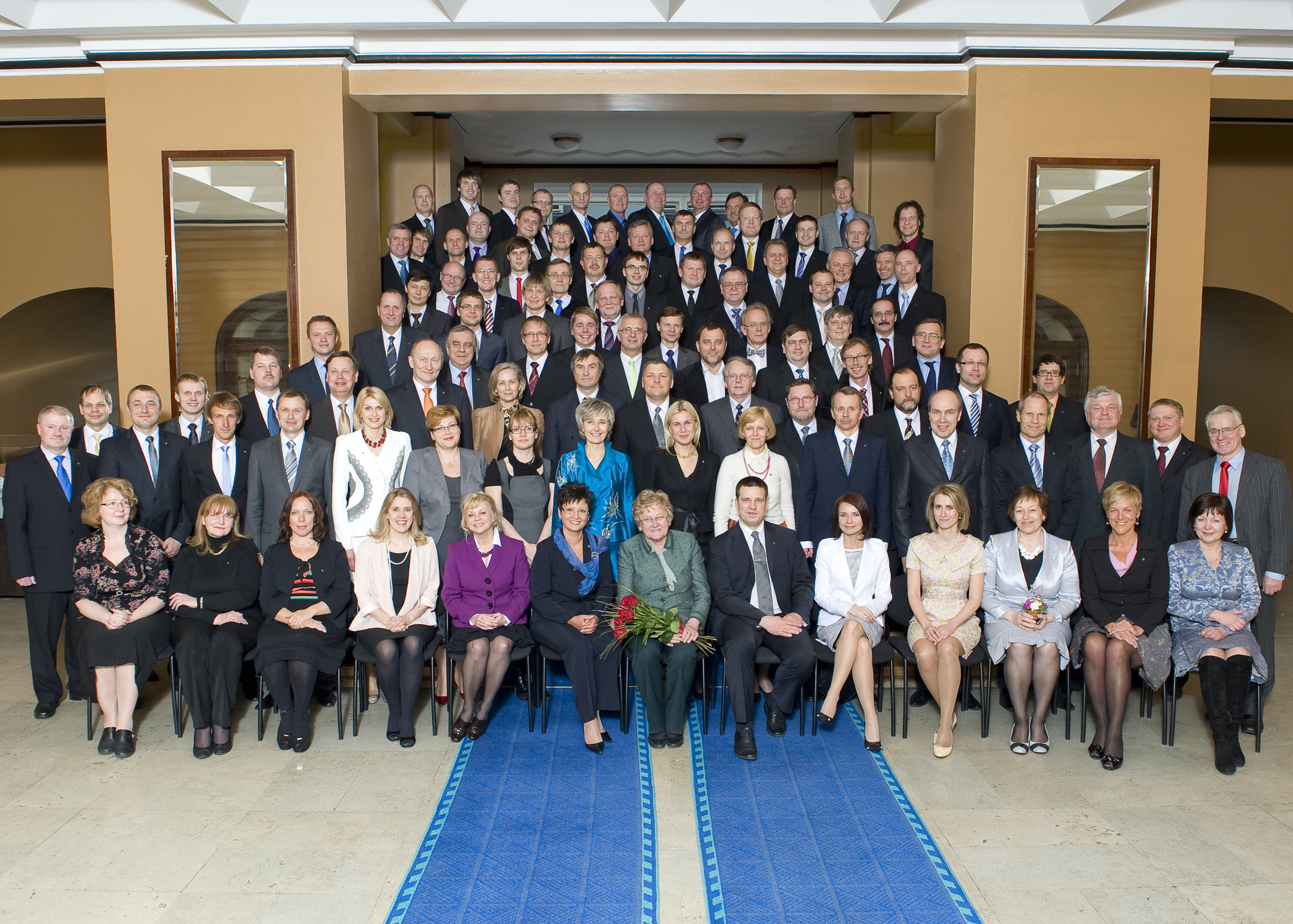
Opening picture of the composition of the XII Riigikogu.

The 12th Riigikogu was the twelfth legislature of the Estonian Parliament (Riigikogu). The legislature was elected after 2011 election.

== Election results ==
Party	Votes	%	Seats	+/–
Estonian Reform Party	164,255	28.6	33	+2
Estonian Centre Party	134,124	23.3	26	–3
Pro Patria and Res Publica Union	118,023	20.5	23	+4
Social Democratic Party	98,307	17.1	19	+9
Estonian Greens	21,824	3.8	0	–6
People's Union of Estonia	12,184	2.1	0	–6
Russian Party in Estonia	5,029	0.9	0	0
Party of Estonian Christian Democrats	2,934	0.5	0	0
Estonian Independence Party	2,571	0.4	0	0
Independents	15,882	2.8	0	0
Invalid/blank votes	5,131	–	–	–
Total	580,264	100	101	0
Registered voters/turnout	913,346	63.5	–	–
Source: VVK

== Officers ==
Speaker of the Riigikogu: Ene Ergma and later Eiki Nestor.
