= Members of the 9th Riigikogu =

This is a list of the members of the 9th Riigikogu, following the 1999 election.

== Election results ==
Party	Votes	%	Seats	+/–
Estonian Centre Party	113,378	23.4	28	+12
Pro Patria Union	77,917	16.1	18	+10
Estonian Reform Party	77,088	15.9	18	–1
Moderates ^{[a]}	73,630	15.2	17	+11
Estonian Coalition Party ^{[b]}	36,692	7.6	7	–
Estonian Country People's Union	35,204	7.3	7	–
Estonian United People's Party ^{[c]}	29.682	6.1	6	–
Estonian Christian People's Party	11,745	2.4	0	New
Russian Party in Estonia	9,825	2.0	0	–
Estonian Blue Party	7,745	1.6	0	0
Farmers' Assembly	2,421	0.5	0	–
Progress Party	1,854	0.4	0	New
Independents	7,058	1.5	0	0
Invalid/blank votes	8,117	–	–	–
Total	492,356	100	101	0
Registered voters/turnout	857,270	57.4	–	–
Source:VVK

== Lists ==
=== By party ===
==== Estonian Centre Party (28) ====
Name	Constituency
Küllo Arjakas	Kesklinn, Lasnamäe and Pirita
Arvo Haug	Haabersti, Põhja-Tallinn and Kristiine
Arvo Jaakson	Lääne-Viru and Ida-Viru
Kalev Kallo	Haabersti, Põhja-Tallinn and Kristiine
Tõnu Kauba	Tartu
Peeter Kreitzberg	Järva and Viljandi
Urmas Laht	Lääne-Viru and Ida-Viru
Anti Liiv	Hiiu, Lääne and Saare
Värner Lootsmann	Mustamäe and Nõmme
Jaanus Marrandi	Järva and Viljandi
Sven Mikser	Järva and Viljandi
Harri Õunapuu	Harju and Rapla
Siiri Oviir	Kesklinn, Lasnamäe and Pirita
Georg Pelisaar	Võru, Valga and Põlva
Koit Pikaro	Pärnu
Olev Raju	Tartu
Viive Rosenberg	Harju and Rapla
Ants Ruusmann	Pärnu
Erika Salumäe	Jõgeva and Tartu
Edgar Savisaar	Lääne-Viru and Ida-Viru
Mihhail Stalnuhhin	Lääne-Viru and Ida-Viru
Ülo Tärno	Mustamäe and Nõmme
Laine Tarvis	Hiiu, Lääne and Saare
Liina Tõnisson	Mustamäe and Nõmme
Toivo Tootsen	Kesklinn, Lasnamäe and Pirita
Ülo Tootsen	Võru, Valga and Põlva
Toomas Varek	Lääne-Viru and Ida-Viru
Vladimir Velman	Kesklinn, Lasnamäe and Pirita

==== Pro Patria Union (18) ====
Name	Constituency
Jüri Adams	Tartu
Sirje Endre	Harju and Rapla
Andres Herkel	Haabersti, Põhja-Tallinn and Kristiine
Kadri Jäätma	Kesklinn, Lasnamäe and Pirita
Kalle Jürgenson	Jõgeva and Tartu
Toivo Jürgenson	Kesklinn, Lasnamäe and Pirita
Mari-Ann Kelam	Mustamäe and Nõmme
Tunne-Väldo Kelam	Lääne-Viru and Ida-Viru
Mart Laar	Järva and Viljandi
Jaan Leppik	Võru, Valga and Põlva
Tõnis Lukas	Tartu
Jüri Mõis	Haabersti, Põhja-Tallinn and Kristiine
Mart Nutt	Hiiu, Lääne and Saare
Peeter Olesk	Jõgeva and Tartu
Jaana Padrik	Harju and Rapla
Tiit Sinissaar	Pärnu
Lauri Vahtre	Mustamäe and Nõmme
Trivimi Velliste	Pärnu

==== Estonian Reform Party (18) ====
Name	Constituency
Andrus Ansip	Tartu
Toivo Asmer	Harju and Rapla
Tiit Käbin	Mustamäe and Nõmme
Siim Kallas	Mustamäe and Nõmme
Kaljo Kiisk	Jõgeva and Tartu
Valve Kirsipuu	Haabersti, Põhja-Tallinn and Kristiine
Jürgen Ligi	Harju and Rapla
Väino Linde	Pärnu
Andres Lipstok	Hiiu, Lääne and Saare
Maret Maripuu	Mustamäe and Nõmme
Uno Mereste	Kesklinn, Lasnamäe and Pirita
Kristiina Ojuland	Lääne-Viru and Ida-Viru
Märt Rask	Järva and Viljandi
Paul-Eerik Rummo	Võru, Valga and Põlva
Toomas Savi	Tartu
Andres Taimla	Järva and Viljandi
Toomas Vilosius	Pärnu
Rein Voog	Haabersti, Põhja-Tallinn and Kristiine

==== Moderates (17) ====
Name	Constituency
Liia Hänni	Jõgeva and Tartu
Vootele Hansen	Haabersti, Põhja-Tallinn and Kristiine
Toomas Hendrik Ilves	Järva and Viljandi
Vambo Kaal	Hiiu, Lääne and Saare
Liis Klaar	Kesklinn, Lasnamäe and Pirita
Tõnu Kõiv	Lääne-Viru and Ida-Viru
Kalev Kotkas	Hiiu, Lääne and Saare
Jaak-Hans Kuks	Võru, Valga and Põlva
Marju Lauristin	Tartu
Mart Meri	Mustamäe and Nõmme
Eiki Nestor	Haabersti, Põhja-Tallinn and Kristiine
Raivo Paavo	Lääne-Viru and Ida-Viru
Mihkel Pärnoja	Tartu
Rainis Ruusamäe	Võru, Valga and Põlva
Jüri Tamm	Harju and Rapla
Andres Tarand	Harju and Rapla
Enn Tarto	Jõgeva and Tartu

==== Estonian Coalition Party (7) ====
Name	Constituency
Ivi Eenmaa	Haabersti, Põhja-Tallinn and Kristiine
Ants Käärma	Järva and Viljandi
Ülo Nugis	Mustamäe and Nõmme
Mart Siimann	Võru, Valga and Põlva
Arvo Sirendi	Harju and Rapla
Mai Treial	Jõgeva and Tartu
Elmar-Johannes Truu	Võru, Valga and Põlva

==== Estonian Country People's Union (7) ====
Name	Constituency
Jaanus Männik	Pärnu
Jaan Pöör	Jõgeva and Tartu
Janno Reiljan	Võru, Valga and Põlva
Villu Reiljan	Jõgeva and Tartu
Arnold Rüütel	Võru, Valga and Põlva
Tiit Tammsaar	Hiiu, Lääne and Saare
Andres Varik	Pärnu

==== Estonian United People's Party (6) ====
Name	Constituency
Viktor Andrejev	Lääne-Viru and Ida-Viru
Sergei Ivanov	Kesklinn, Lasnamäe and Pirita
Endel Paap	Lääne-Viru and Ida-Viru
Jevgeni Tomberg	Mustamäe and Nõmme
Tiit Toomsalu	Haabersti, Põhja-Tallinn and Kristiine
Valentina Võssotskaja	Haabersti, Põhja-Tallinn and Kristiine

=== By votes ===
	Name	Votes	Party
1.	Edgar Savisaar	14,320	Kesk
2.	Andres Tarand	11,112	Mod
3.	Toivo Jürgenson	7,560	PP
4.	Siim Kallas	7,465	Ref
5.	Jüri Mõis	6,739	PP
6.	Toomas Savi	6,535	Ref
7.	Tõnis Lukas	5,667	PP
8.	Toivo Asmer	5,590	Ref
9.	Mart Laar	5,446	PP
10.	Siiri Oviir	5,346	Kesk
Source: VVK
