= Riigikogu electoral district no. 6 (1995–2003) =

Electoral district of Estonia

Electoral district no. 6
- Valimisringkond nr 6
- Former Electoral District for the Riigikogu
- County: Ida-Viru; Lääne-Viru

Former Electoral District
- Created: 1995
- Abolished: 2003
- Seats: List: 13 (1999–2003); 11 (1995–1999)
- Created from: District no. 7; District no. 8
- Replaced by: District no. 6; District no. 7

Electoral district no. 6 (Estonian: Valimisringkond nr 6) was one of the multi-member electoral districts of the Riigikogu, the national legislature of Estonia. The district was established in 1995 following the re-organisation of electoral districts. It was abolished in 2003. It was conterminous with the counties of Ida-Viru and Lääne-Viru.

== Election results ==
=== Detailed ===
Party has received at least 5% of the vote nationally and is entitled to compete for district seats.

==== 1999 ====
Results of the 1999 parliamentary election held on 7 March 1999:

Party		Votes per county			Total Votes	%	Seats			
Party		Ida- Viru	Lääne- Viru	Expat- riates	Total Votes	%	Per.	Dis.	Com.	Tot.
Estonian Centre Party	K	12,242	9,711	14	21,967	34.60%	1	3	1	5
Estonian United People's Party	EÜRP	9,815	378	3	10,196	16.06%	0	2	0	2
Moderate	M	2,985	4,790	18	7,793	12.28%	0	1	1	2
Pro Patria Union	I	2,638	4,309	202	7,149	11.26%	0	1	0	1
Estonian Reform Party	RE	2,952	2,978	11	5,941	9.36%	0	1	0	1
Estonian Coalition Party	KE	2,434	1,466	9	3,909	6.16%	0	0	0	0
Estonian Country People's Party	EME	1,428	1,703	5	3,136	4.94%	0	0	0	0
Estonian Christian People's Party	EKRP	526	828	3	1,357	2.14%	0	0	0	0
Russian Party in Estonia	VEE	753	91	0	844	1.33%	0	0	0	0
Estonian Blue Party	ESE	618	127	3	748	1.18%	0	0	0	0
Gennadi Belov (Independent)		195	32	0	227	0.36%	0	0	0	0
Farmers' Assembly		67	69	2	138	0.22%	0	0	0	0
Progress Party		69	12	0	81	0.13%	0	0	0	0
Valid votes		36,722	26,494	270	63,486	100.00%	1	8	2	11
Rejected votes		696	402	5	1,103	1.71%				
Total polled		37,418	26,896	275	64,589	56.72%				
Registered electors		64,648	48,950	275	113,873					
Turnout		57.88%	54.95%	100.00%	56.72%					

The following candidates were elected:

- Personal mandates - Edgar Savisaar (K), 14,320 votes.
- District mandates - Viktor Andrejev (EÜRP), 3,710 votes; Tunne-Väldo Kelam (I), 4,283 votes; Urmas Laht (K), 840 votes; Kristiina Ojuland (RE), 3,112 votes; Endel Paap (EÜRP), 2,530 votes; Raivo Paavo (M), 2,861 votes; Mihhail Stalnuhhin (K), 2,570 votes; and Toomas Varek (K), 1,115 votes.
- Compensatory mandates - Arvo Jaakson (K), 218 votes; and Tõnu Kõiv (M), 163 votes.

==== 1995 ====
Results of the 1995 parliamentary election held on 5 March 1995:

Party		Votes per county			Total Votes	%	Seats			
Party		Ida- Viru	Lääne- Viru	Expat- riates	Total Votes	%	Per.	Dis.	Com.	Tot.
Coalition Party and Rural People's Association	KMÜ	7,980	11,326	39	19,345	30.69%	1	2	0	3
Estonian Centre Party	K	8,255	7,027	16	15,298	24.27%	1	0	0	1
Estonian Reform Party	RE	2,606	3,987	43	6,636	10.53%	0	1	2	3
Pro Patria and ERSP Union	I\ERSP	2,118	2,987	333	5,438	8.63%	0	0	0	0
Our Home is Estonia	MKOE	4,594	339	8	4,941	7.84%	0	0	1	1
Justice	Õ	2,925	268	6	3,199	5.08%	0	0	0	0
Moderate	M	1,377	1,115	27	2,519	4.00%	0	0	1	1
The Right Wingers	P	754	1,246	22	2,022	3.21%	0	0	0	0
Better Estonia/Estonian Citizen	PE/EK	529	531	7	1,067	1.69%	0	0	0	0
Estonian Future Party	TEE	475	422	7	904	1.43%	0	0	0	0
Estonian Farmers' Party	ETRE	211	192	2	405	0.64%	0	0	0	0
Estonian National Federation	ERKL	302	82	0	384	0.61%	0	0	0	0
Fourth Force	NJ	162	196	4	362	0.57%	0	0	0	0
Blue Party	SE	54	203	0	257	0.41%	0	0	0	0
Forest Party		140	64	1	205	0.33%	0	0	0	0
Estonian Democratic Union	EDL	18	29	0	47	0.07%	0	0	0	0
Valid votes		32,500	30,014	515	63,029	100.00%	2	3	4	9
Rejected votes		326	255	0	581	0.91%				
Total polled		32,826	30,269	515	63,610	66.85%				
Registered electors		48,857	45,782	515	95,154					
Turnout		67.19%	66.12%	100.00%	66.85%					

The following candidates were elected:

- Personal mandates - Juhan Aare (KMÜ), 8,433 votes; and Edgar Savisaar (K), 13,699 votes.
- District mandates - Kaljo Kiisk (RE), 4,437 votes; Ando Leps (KMÜ), 1,630 votes; and Harald Mägi (KMÜ), 1,754 votes.
- Compensatory mandates - Viktor Andrejev (MKOE), 3,362 votes; Vambo Kaal (M), 1,949 votes; Kristiina Ojuland (RE), 492 votes; and Feliks Undusk (RE), 1,359 votes.
