= Riigikogu electoral district no. 3 =

Electoral district of Estonia

Electoral district no. 3
- Valimisringkond nr 3
- Electoral District for the Riigikogu
- Location of Electoral district no. 3 within Estonia
- Municipality: Tallinn
- County: Harju
- Population: 104,953 (2020)
- Electorate: 71,882 (2019)

Current Electoral District
- Created: 1995
- Seats: 8 (1995–present)
- Member of the Riigikogu: List: Johannes Kert (RE); Igor Kravtšenko (K); Maris Lauri (RE); Oudekki Loone (K); Vilja Toomast (RE)

Electoral district no. 3 (Estonian: Valimisringkond nr 3) is one of the 12 multi-member electoral districts of the Riigikogu, the national legislature of Estonia. The electoral district was established in 1995 following the re-organisation of the electoral districts in Tallinn. It is conterminous with the districts of Mustamäe and Nõmme in Tallinn. The district currently elects eight of the 101 members of the Riigikogu using the open party-list proportional representation electoral system. At the 2019 parliamentary election it had 71,882 registered electors.

== Electoral system ==
Electoral district no. 3 currently elects eight of the 101 members of the Riigikogu using the open party-list proportional representation electoral system. The allocation of seats is carried out in three stages. In the first stage, any individual candidate, regardless of whether they are a party or independent candidate, who receives more votes than the district's simple quota (Hare quota: valid votes in district/number of seats allocated to district) is elected via a personal mandate. In the second stage, district mandates are allocated to parties by dividing their district votes by the district's simple quota. Only parties that reach the 5% national threshold compete for district mandates and any personal mandates won by the party are subtracted from the party's district mandates. Prior to 2003 if a party's surplus/remainder votes was equal to or greater than 75% of the district's simple quota it received one additional district mandate. Any unallocated district seats are added to a national pool of compensatory seats. In the final stage, compensatory mandates are calculated based on the national vote and using a modified D'Hondt method. Only parties that reach the 5% national threshold compete for compensatory seats and any personal and district mandates won by the party are subtracted from the party's compensatory mandates. Though calculated nationally, compensatory mandates are allocated at the district level.

=== Seats ===
Seats allocated to electoral district no. 3 by the National Electoral Committee of Estonia at each election was as follows:

- 2023 - 8
- 2019 - 8
- 2015 - 8
- 2011 - 8
- 2007 - 8
- 2003 - 8
- 1999 - 8
- 1995 - 8

== Election results ==
=== Summary ===
Election	Left EÜVP/EVP/ESDTP/Õ/V			Constitution K/EÜRP/MKOE			Social Democrats SDE/RM/M			Greens EER/NJ/R			Centre K/R			Reform RE			Isamaa I/IRL/I/I\ERSP/I			Conservative People's EKRE/ERL/EME/KMÜ		
Election	Votes	%	Seats	Votes	%	Seats	Votes	%	Seats	Votes	%	Seats	Votes	%	Seats	Votes	%	Seats	Votes	%	Seats	Votes	%	Seats
2023	953	1.87%	0				4,563	8.93%	0	584	1.14%	0	9,654	18.90%	1	17,730	34.71%	3	3,305	6.47%	0	5,960	11.67%	1
2019	37	0.07%	0				4,651	9.32%	0	1,227	2.46%	0	11,945	23.95%	2	16,209	32.49%	2	5,086	10.20%	1	7,055	14.14%	1
2015	39	0.07%	0				7,311	14.00%	1	512	0.98%	0	12,732	24.39%	2	15,784	30.23%	2	5,696	10.91%	1	4,570	8.75%	0
2011							7,648	15.15%	1	1,564	3.10%	0	12,796	25.35%	2	16,309	32.31%	2	10,188	20.18%	1	237	0.47%	0
2007	43	0.09%	0	489	1.00%	0	5,002	10.22%	1	3,821	7.81%	0	12,092	24.71%	2	15,951	32.59%	2	9,384	19.17%	1	909	1.86%	0
2003	195	0.43%	0	1,268	2.82%	0	2,260	5.03%	0				11,014	24.53%	2	11,993	26.71%	2	3,714	8.27%	0	1,612	3.59%	0
1999				3,037	7.07%	0	6,207	14.45%	1				7,662	17.84%	1	10,098	23.51%	1	9,220	21.47%	1	792	1.84%	0
1995	1,456	3.01%	0	4,376	9.04%	0	2,256	4.66%	0	521	1.08%	0	6,294	13.01%	1	11,512	23.79%	1	5,142	10.63%	0	12,300	25.42%	2

(Excludes compensatory seats)

=== Detailed ===
Party has received at least 5% of the vote nationally and is entitled to compete for district seats.

==== 2023 ====
Results of the 2023 parliamentary election held on 5 March 2023:

Party		Votes per district				Total Votes	%	Seats			
Party		Musta- mäe	Nõmme	Expat- riates	Elec- tronic	Total Votes	%	Per.	Dis.	Com.	Tot.
Estonian Reform Party	RE	2,494	2,385	44	12,271	17,730	34.71%	1	2	0	3
Estonian Centre Party	K	5,382	1,125	6	2,673	9,654	18.90%	0	1	0	1
Estonia 200	EE200	1,174	1,046	10	4,818	7,263	14.22%	0	1	0	1
Conservative People's Party of Estonia	EKRE	2,184	1,805	56	1,615	5,960	11.67%	0	1	0	1
Social Democratic Party	SDE	783	710	13	2,888	4,563	8.93%	0	0	1	1
Isamaa	I	715	763	10	1,654	3,305	6.47%	0	0	0	0
Parempoolsed		172	201	2	663	1,072	2.10%	0	0	0	0
Estonian United Left Party	EÜVP	602	123	1	182	953	1.87%	0	0	0	0
Estonian Greens	EER	125	88	1	348	584	1.14%	0	0	0	0
Valid votes		13,631	8,246	143	27,112	51,084	100.00%	1	5	1	7
Rejected votes		129	56	3	0	226	0.04%				
Total polled		13,760	8,302	146	27,112	51,310	69.09%				
Registered electors		42,104	26,981	5,185		74,270					

The following candidates were elected:

- Personal mandates - Urmas Paet (REF), 9,154 votes.
- District mandates - Martin Helme (EKRE), 4,606 votes; Lauri Laats (KESK), 5,984 votes; Maris Lauri (REF), 4,085 votes; and Vilja Toomast (REF), 2,633 votes; and Margus Tsahkna (EE200), 2,922 votes.
- Compensatory mandates - Riina Sikkut (SDE), 2,531 votes.

==== 2019 ====
Results of the 2019 parliamentary election held on 3 March 2019:

Party		Votes per district				Total Votes	%	Seats			
Party		Musta- mäe	Nõmme	Expat- riates	Elec- tronic	Total Votes	%	Per.	Dis.	Com.	Tot.
Estonian Reform Party	RE	2,822	2,766	35	10,586	16,209	32.49%	1	1	2	4
Estonian Centre Party	K	7,438	2,077	15	2,415	11,945	23.95%	0	2	0	2
Conservative People's Party of Estonia	EKRE	2,387	2,104	64	2,500	7,055	14.14%	0	1	0	1
Isamaa	I	1,315	1,124	25	2,622	5,086	10.20%	0	1	0	1
Social Democratic Party	SDE	1,005	1,087	20	2,539	4,651	9.32%	0	0	0	0
Estonia 200		431	479	7	1,398	2,315	4.64%	0	0	0	0
Estonian Greens	EER	247	231	10	739	1,227	2.46%	0	0	0	0
Estonian Free Party	EVA	187	167	4	356	714	1.43%	0	0	0	0
Estonian Biodiversity Party		99	128	4	313	544	1.09%	0	0	0	0
Kalju Mätik (Independent)		21	19	0	22	62	0.12%	0	0	0	0
Estonian United Left Party	EÜVP	26	5	0	6	37	0.07%	0	0	0	0
Veiko Tani (Independent)		8	10	0	19	37	0.07%	0	0	0	0
Valid votes		15,986	10,197	184	23,515	49,882	100.00%	1	5	2	8
Rejected votes		173	84	2	0	259	0.52%				
Total polled		16,159	10,281	186	23,515	50,141	69.75%				
Registered electors		43,191	28,132	559		71,882					

The following candidates were elected:

- Personal mandates - Urmas Paet (RE), 8,584 votes.
- District mandates - Taavi Aas (K), 3,925 votes; Martin Helme (EKRE), 5,967 votes; Lauri Laats (Note: Lauri Laats declined to take up a seat in the Riigikogu.) (K), 3,251 votes; Maris Lauri (RE), 4,331 votes; and Urmas Reinsalu (I), 2,633 votes.
- Compensatory mandates - Johannes Kert (RE), 708 votes; and Vilja Toomast (RE), 953 votes.

==== 2015 ====
Results of the 2015 parliamentary election held on 1 March 2015:

Party		Votes per district				Total Votes	%	Seats			
Party		Musta- mäe	Nõmme	Expat- riates	Elec- tronic	Total Votes	%	Per.	Dis.	Com.	Tot.
Estonian Reform Party	RE	4,226	3,981	47	7,530	15,784	30.23%	1	1	1	3
Estonian Centre Party	K	9,147	2,494	13	1,078	12,732	24.39%	0	2	0	2
Social Democratic Party	SDE	2,187	2,356	16	2,752	7,311	14.00%	0	1	0	1
Pro Patria and Res Publica Union	IRL	1,786	1,533	32	2,345	5,696	10.91%	0	1	0	1
Estonian Free Party	EVA	1,477	1,509	9	2,426	5,421	10.38%	0	1	0	1
Conservative People's Party of Estonia	EKRE	1,791	1,479	23	1,277	4,570	8.75%	0	0	1	1
Estonian Greens	EER	173	130	4	205	512	0.98%	0	0	0	0
Party of People's Unity	RÜE	31	17	1	29	78	0.15%	0	0	0	0
Estonian Independence Party	EIP	26	28	1	12	67	0.13%	0	0	0	0
Estonian United Left Party	EÜVP	27	9	0	3	39	0.07%	0	0	0	0
Valid votes		20,871	13,536	146	17,657	52,210	100.00%	1	6	2	9
Rejected votes		166	82	2	0	250	0.48%				
Total polled		21,037	13,618	148	17,657	52,460	72.58%				
Registered electors		43,316	28,812	148		72,276					

The following candidates were elected:

- Personal mandates - Urmas Paet (RE), 7,868 votes.
- District mandates - Maris Lauri (RE), 4,019 votes; Ain Lutsepp (EVA), 4,109 votes; Rein Ratas (K), 3,449 votes; Urmas Reinsalu (IRL), 2,949 votes; Erki Savisaar (K), 1,826 votes; and Rainer Vakra (SDE), 4,132 votes.
- Compensatory mandates - Martin Helme (EKRE), 4,296 votes; and Martin Kukk (RE), 456 votes.

==== 2011 ====
Results of the 2011 parliamentary election held on 6 March 2011:

Party		Votes per district				Total Votes	%	Seats			
Party		Musta- mäe	Nõmme	Expat- riates	Elec- tronic	Total Votes	%	Per.	Dis.	Com.	Tot.
Estonian Reform Party	RE	5,052	5,038	51	6,168	16,309	32.31%	1	1	0	2
Estonian Centre Party	K	8,603	2,663	8	1,522	12,796	25.35%	1	1	0	2
Pro Patria and Res Publica Union	IRL	3,362	3,284	57	3,485	10,188	20.18%	0	1	1	2
Social Democratic Party	SDE	3,120	2,150	11	2,367	7,648	15.15%	0	1	0	1
Estonian Greens	EER	535	540	17	472	1,564	3.10%	0	0	0	0
Toomas Trapido (Independent)		155	143	2	143	443	0.88%	0	0	0	0
Russian Party in Estonia	VEE	273	77	1	79	430	0.85%	0	0	0	0
Henn Põlluaas (Independent)		126	92	0	75	293	0.58%	0	0	0	0
Party of Estonian Christian Democrats	EKD	111	93	1	65	270	0.53%	0	0	0	0
Estonian Independence Party	EIP	126	88	2	45	261	0.52%	0	0	0	0
People's Union of Estonia	ERL	101	77	1	58	237	0.47%	0	0	0	0
Ragnar Nurmik (Independent)		19	17	1	6	43	0.09%	0	0	0	0
Valid votes		21,583	14,262	152	14,485	50,482	100.00%	2	4	1	7
Rejected votes		203	132	6	0	341	0.67%				
Total polled		21,786	14,394	158	14,485	50,823	72.80%				
Registered electors		41,868	27,790	158		69,816					

The following candidates were elected:

- Personal mandates - Urmas Paet (RE), 10,779 votes; and Jüri Ratas (K), 7,620 votes.
- District mandates - Peeter Kreitzberg (SDE), 3,144 votes; Urmas Reinsalu (IRL), 5,055 votes; Aivar Sõerd (RE), 1,615 votes; and Rainer Vakra (K), 1,259 votes.
- Compensatory mandates - Siim Valmar Kiisler (IRL), 1,388 votes.

==== 2007 ====
Results of the 2007 parliamentary election held on 4 March 2007:

Party		Votes per district				Total Votes	%	Seats			
Party		Musta- mäe	Nõmme	Expat- riates	Elec- tronic	Total Votes	%	Per.	Dis.	Com.	Tot.
Estonian Reform Party	RE	7,175	7,258	35	1,483	15,951	32.59%	1	1	1	3
Estonian Centre Party	K	8,687	3,117	13	275	12,092	24.71%	0	2	1	3
Pro Patria and Res Publica Union	IRL	4,244	4,067	104	969	9,384	19.17%	0	1	2	3
Social Democratic Party	SDE	2,577	1,968	25	432	5,002	10.22%	0	1	0	1
Estonian Greens	EER	1,739	1,672	18	392	3,821	7.81%	0	0	0	0
People's Union of Estonia	ERL	581	266	3	59	909	1.86%	0	0	1	1
Party of Estonian Christian Democrats	EKD	468	396	4	40	908	1.86%	0	0	0	0
Constitution Party	K	396	78	1	14	489	1.00%	0	0	0	0
Estonian Independence Party	EIP	49	62	1	13	125	0.26%	0	0	0	0
Koit Luus (Independent)		51	56	0	4	111	0.23%	0	0	0	0
Russian Party in Estonia	VEE	81	19	1	9	110	0.22%	0	0	0	0
Estonian Left Party	EVP	28	11	0	4	43	0.09%	0	0	0	0
Valid votes		26,076	18,970	205	3,694	48,945	100.00%	1	5	5	11
Rejected votes		246	117	9	0	372	0.75%				
Total polled		26,322	19,087	214	3,694	49,317	70.79%				
Registered electors		41,499	27,951	214		69,664					

The following candidates were elected:

- Personal mandates - Urmas Paet (RE), 8,685 votes.
- District mandates - Enn Eesmaa (K), 1,420 votes; Peeter Kreitzberg (SDE), 3,606 votes; Maret Maripuu (RE), 3,298 votes; Juhan Parts (IRL), 2,975 votes; and Jüri Ratas (K), 6,109 votes.
- Compensatory mandates - Helle Kalda (K), 838 votes; Mart Nutt (IRL), 887 votes; Urmas Reinsalu (IRL), 1,888 votes; Paul-Eerik Rummo (RE), 916 votes; and Erika Salumäe (ERL), 576 votes.

==== 2003 ====
Results of the 2003 parliamentary election held on 2 March 2003:

Party		Votes per district			Total Votes	%	Seats			
Party		Musta- mäe	Nõmme	Expat- riates	Total Votes	%	Per.	Dis.	Com.	Tot.
Estonian Reform Party	RE	5,279	6,702	12	11,993	26.71%	1	1	0	2
Union for the Republic–Res Publica	ÜVE-RP	7,253	4,359	45	11,657	25.96%	0	2	0	2
Estonian Centre Party	K	7,720	3,279	15	11,014	24.53%	0	2	0	2
Pro Patria Union Party	I	1,890	1,719	105	3,714	8.27%	0	0	0	0
Moderate People's Party	RM	1,275	964	21	2,260	5.03%	0	0	0	0
People's Union of Estonia	ERL	1,018	591	3	1,612	3.59%	0	0	1	1
Estonian United People's Party	EÜRP	1,131	135	2	1,268	2.82%	0	0	0	0
Estonian Christian People's Party	EKRP	350	295	4	649	1.45%	0	0	0	0
Estonian Independence Party	EIP	127	125	0	252	0.56%	0	0	0	0
Estonian Social Democratic Labour Party	ESDTP	129	65	1	195	0.43%	0	0	0	0
Russian Party in Estonia	VEE	134	27	0	161	0.36%	0	0	0	0
Kaarel Jaak Roosaare (Independent)		35	27	2	64	0.14%	0	0	0	0
Kalju Mätik (Independent)		31	27	1	59	0.13%	0	0	0	0
Valid votes		26,372	18,315	211	44,898	100.00%	1	5	1	7
Rejected votes		282	118	3	403	0.89%				
Total polled		26,654	18,433	214	45,301	68.57%				
Registered electors		39,992	25,858	214	66,064					
Turnout		66.65%	71.29%	100.00%	68.57%					

The following candidates were elected:

- Personal mandates - Urmas Paet (RE), 7,560 votes.
- District mandates - Olav Aarna (ÜVE-RP), 4,470 votes; Enn Eesmaa (K), 3,295 votes; Maret Maripuu (RE), 2,236 votes; Siiri Oviir (K), 2,631 votes; and Urmas Reinsalu (ÜVE-RP), 2,754 votes.
- Compensatory mandates - Mart Opmann (ERL), 396 votes.

==== 1999 ====
Results of the 1999 parliamentary election held on 7 March 1999:

Party		Votes per district			Total Votes	%	Seats			
Party		Musta- mäe	Nõmme	Expat- riates	Total Votes	%	Per.	Dis.	Com.	Tot.
Estonian Reform Party	RE	5,229	4,830	39	10,098	23.51%	1	0	2	3
Pro Patria Union	I	5,047	3,960	213	9,220	21.47%	0	1	1	2
Estonian Centre Party	K	4,916	2,738	8	7,662	17.84%	0	1	2	3
Moderate	M	3,711	2,457	39	6,207	14.45%	0	1	0	1
Estonian United People's Party	EÜRP	2,671	366	0	3,037	7.07%	0	0	1	1
Estonian Coalition Party	KE	892	759	0	1,651	3.84%	0	0	1	1
Estonian Blue Party	ESE	840	705	20	1,565	3.64%	0	0	0	0
Estonian Christian People's Party	EKRP	744	612	4	1,360	3.17%	0	0	0	0
Russian Party in Estonia	VEE	838	139	0	977	2.28%	0	0	0	0
Estonian Country People's Party	EME	506	285	1	792	1.84%	0	0	0	0
Progress Party		182	62	0	244	0.57%	0	0	0	0
Farmers' Assembly		51	28	1	80	0.19%	0	0	0	0
Michel Zdankevitch (Independent)		38	13	0	51	0.12%	0	0	0	0
Valid votes		25,665	16,954	325	42,944	100.00%	1	3	7	11
Rejected votes		390	184	6	580	1.33%				
Total polled		26,055	17,138	331	43,524	64.68%				
Registered electors		41,075	25,886	331	67,292					
Turnout		63.43%	66.21%	100.00%	64.68%					

The following candidates were elected:

- Personal mandates - Siim Kallas (RE), 7,465 votes.
- District mandates - Mart Meri (M), 2,600 votes; Liina Tõnisson (K), 2,241 votes; and Lauri Vahtre (I), 4,495 votes.
- Compensatory mandates - Tiit Käbin (RE), 1,215 votes; Mari-Ann Kelam (I), 1,842 votes; Värner Lootsmann (K), 293 votes; Maret Maripuu (RE), 553 votes; Ülo Nugis (KE), 800 votes; Ülo Tärno (K), 166 votes; and Jevgeni Tomberg (EÜRP), 1,101 votes.

==== 1995 ====
Results of the 1995 parliamentary election held on 5 March 1995:

Party		Votes per district			Total Votes	%	Seats			
Party		Musta- mäe	Nõmme	Expat- riates	Total Votes	%	Per.	Dis.	Com.	Tot.
Coalition Party and Rural People's Association	KMÜ	7,735	4,499	66	12,300	25.42%	1	1	2	4
Estonian Reform Party	RE	6,258	5,137	117	11,512	23.79%	1	0	1	2
Estonian Centre Party	K	4,011	2,269	14	6,294	13.01%	0	1	1	2
Pro Patria and ERSP Union	I\ERSP	2,743	2,017	382	5,142	10.63%	0	0	2	2
Our Home is Estonia	MKOE	3,709	662	5	4,376	9.04%	0	0	0	0
Moderate	M	1,393	839	24	2,256	4.66%	0	0	0	0
Justice	Õ	885	566	5	1,456	3.01%	0	0	0	0
Better Estonia/Estonian Citizen	PE/EK	772	577	9	1,358	2.81%	0	0	0	0
The Right Wingers	P	680	456	44	1,180	2.44%	0	0	0	0
Estonian Future Party	TEE	443	428	4	875	1.81%	0	0	0	0
Fourth Force	NJ	297	217	7	521	1.08%	0	0	0	0
Estonian National Federation	ERKL	203	147	1	351	0.73%	0	0	0	0
Estonian Farmers' Party	ETRE	125	71	2	198	0.41%	0	0	0	0
Forest Party		102	73	2	177	0.37%	0	0	0	0
Blue Party	SE	95	60	1	156	0.32%	0	0	0	0
Aleksandr Dormidontov (Independent)		35	20	0	55	0.11%	0	0	0	0
Jüri Liiv (Independent)		33	20	0	53	0.11%	0	0	0	0
Heikki Tann (Independent)		24	18	0	42	0.09%	0	0	0	0
Estonian Democratic Union	EDL	20	14	3	37	0.08%	0	0	0	0
Eldur Jõgimaa (Independent)		15	12	0	27	0.06%	0	0	0	0
Harri Roop (Independent)		19	6	0	25	0.05%	0	0	0	0
Valid votes		29,597	18,108	686	48,391	100.00%	2	2	6	10
Rejected votes		234	110	0	344	0.71%				
Total polled		29,831	18,218	686	48,735	75.05%				
Registered electors		39,595	24,657	686	64,938					
Turnout		75.34%	73.89%	100.00%	75.05%					

The following candidates were elected:

- Personal mandates - Tiit Käbin (RE), 9,812 votes; and Endel Lippmaa (KMÜ), 7,540 votes.
- District mandates - Endel Eero (KMÜ), 3,241 votes; and Liina Tõnisson (K), 3,892 votes.
- Compensatory mandates - Jaanus Betlem (I\ERSP), 319 votes; Tunne Kelam (I\ERSP), 4,335 votes; Kalev Kukk (RE), 531 votes; Peeter Lorents (KMÜ), 149 votes; Talvi Märja (KMÜ), 207 votes; and Mart Ummelas (K), 805 votes.
