= List of people with most personal votes in Estonian parliamentary elections =

This is a list of people with most personal votes in Estonian parliamentary elections.

== After re-independence ==
	Name	Votes	Election	Constituency	Party	Ref
1.	Edgar Savisaar	25,055	2015	Kesklinn, Lasnamäe and Pirita	Estonian Centre Party	
2.	Edgar Savisaar	23,000	2011	Kesklinn, Lasnamäe and Pirita	Estonian Centre Party	
3.	Andrus Ansip	22,540	2007	Harju- and Raplamaa	Estonian Reform Party	
4.	Kaja Kallas	20,072	2019	Harju- and Raplamaa	Estonian Reform Party	
5.	Andrus Ansip	18,967	2011	Harju- and Raplamaa	Estonian Reform Party	
6.	Edgar Savisaar	18,003	2007	Kesklinn, Lasnamäe and Pirita	Estonian Centre Party	
7.	Arnold Rüütel	17,189	1995	Võru-, Valga- and Põlvamaa	Coalition Party and Country Union	
8.	Mihhail Kõlvart	17,150	2019	Kesklinn, Lasnamäe and Pirita	Estonian Centre Party	
9.	Jüri Toomepuu	16,904	1992	Võru-, Valga- and Põlvamaa	Estonian Citizen	
10.	Taavi Rõivas	15,881	2015	Harju- and Raplamaa	Estonian Reform Party	
11.	Edgar Savisaar	14,320	1999	Ida- and Lääne-Virumaa	Estonian Centre Party	
12.	Edgar Savisaar	13,699	1995	Ida- and Lääne-Virumaa	Estonian Centre Party	
13.	Edgar Savisaar	12,960	2003	Kesklinn, Lasnamäe and Pirita	Estonian Centre Party	
14.	Yana Toom	11,574	2015	Ida-Virumaa	Estonian Centre Party	
15.	Andres Tarand	11,422	1995	Harju- and Raplamaa	Moderates	
16.	Andres Tarand	11,112	1999	Harju- and Raplamaa	Moderates	
17.	Mihhail Kõlvart	10,996	2015	Haabersti, Põhja-Tallinn and Kristiine	Estonian Centre Party	
18.	Uno Mereste	10,806	1995	Kesklinn, Lasnamäe and Pirita	Estonian Reform Party	
19.	Urmas Paet	10,779	2011	Mustamäe and Nõmme	Estonian Reform Party	
20.	Siim Kallas	10,459	1995	Haabersti, Põhja-Tallinn and Kristiine	Estonian Reform Party	
21.	Siim Kallas	10,008	2003	Harju- and Raplamaa	Estonian Reform Party	
22.	Tiit Käbin	9,812	1995	Mustamäe and Nõmme	Estonian Reform Party	
23.	Jüri Ratas	9,702	2019	Harju- and Raplamaa	Estonian Centre Party	
24.	Matti Päts	9,618	1992	Jõgeva- and Viljandimaa	Bloc Fatherland	
25.	Mart Laar	9,541	2011	Harju- and Raplamaa	Pro Patria and Res Publica Union	
26.	Juhan Aare	9,341	1992	Järvämaa and Lääne-Virumaa	Safe Home	
27.	Laine Jänes	9,303	2007	Tartu	Estonian Reform Party	
28.	Mart Laar	9,237	2007	Kesklinn, Lasnamäe and Pirita	Pro Patria and Res Publica Union	
29.	Enn Tarto	9,195	1992	Tartu and Tartumaa	Bloc Fatherland	
30.	Mart Helme	9,170	2019	Tartu and Tartumaa	EKRE	
31.	Valve Kirsipuu	9,051	1992	Lääne-Tallinna	Moderates	
32.	Keit Pentus	8,784	2011	Kesklinn, Lasnamäe and Pirita	Estonian Reform Party	
33.	Siim Kallas	8,733	2019	Kesklinn, Lasnamäe and Pirita	Estonian Reform Party	
34.	Urmas Paet	8,685	2007	Mustamäe and Nõmme	Estonian Reform Party	
35.	Mihhail Stalnuhhin	8,584	2011	Ida-Virumaa	Estonian Centre Party	
36.	Urmas Paet	8,584	2019	Mustamäe and Nõmme	Estonian Reform Party	
37.	Vilja Savisaar	8,531	2007	Kesklinn, Lasnamäe and Pirita	Estonian Centre Party	
38.	Juhan Aare	8,433	1995	Ida- and Lääne-Virumaa	Coalition Party and Country Union	
39.	Kaido Kama	8,225	1995	Võru-, Valga- and Põlvamaa	The Right Wingers	
40.	Jüri Ratas	7,932	2015	Harju- and Raplamaa	Estonian Centre Party	
41.	Urmas Paet	7,868	2015	Mustamäe and Nõmme	Estonian Reform Party	
42.	Mart Laar	7,631	1992	Harju- and Raplamaa	Bloc Fatherland	
43.	Jüri Ratas	7,620	2011	Mustamäe and Nõmme	Estonian Centre Party	
44.	Toomas Kivimägi	7,603	2015	Pärnumaa	Estonian Reform Party	
45.	Toivo Jürgenson	7,560	1999	Kesklinn, Lasnamäe and Pirita	Pro Patria Union	
46.	Urmas Paet	7,560	2003	Mustamäe and Nõmme	Estonian Reform Party	
47.	Endel Lippmaa	7,540	1995	Mustamäe and Nõmme	Coalition Party and Country Union	
48.	Tõnis Palts	7,514	2003	Kesklinn, Lasnamäe and Pirita	Res Publica	
49.	Siim Kallas	7,465	1999	Mustamäe and Nõmme	Estonian Reform Party	
50.	Sven Mikser	7,431	2011	Järva- and Viljandimaa	Social Democratic Party	
