= Jaana Padrik =

Estonian politician (born 1958)

Jaana Padrik (born 23 June 1958, in Tallinn) is an Estonia journalist and politician. She was a member of IX Riigikogu.

She has been a member of Pro Patria Union.
