= Kadri Jäätma =

Estonian politician

Epp Haabsaar
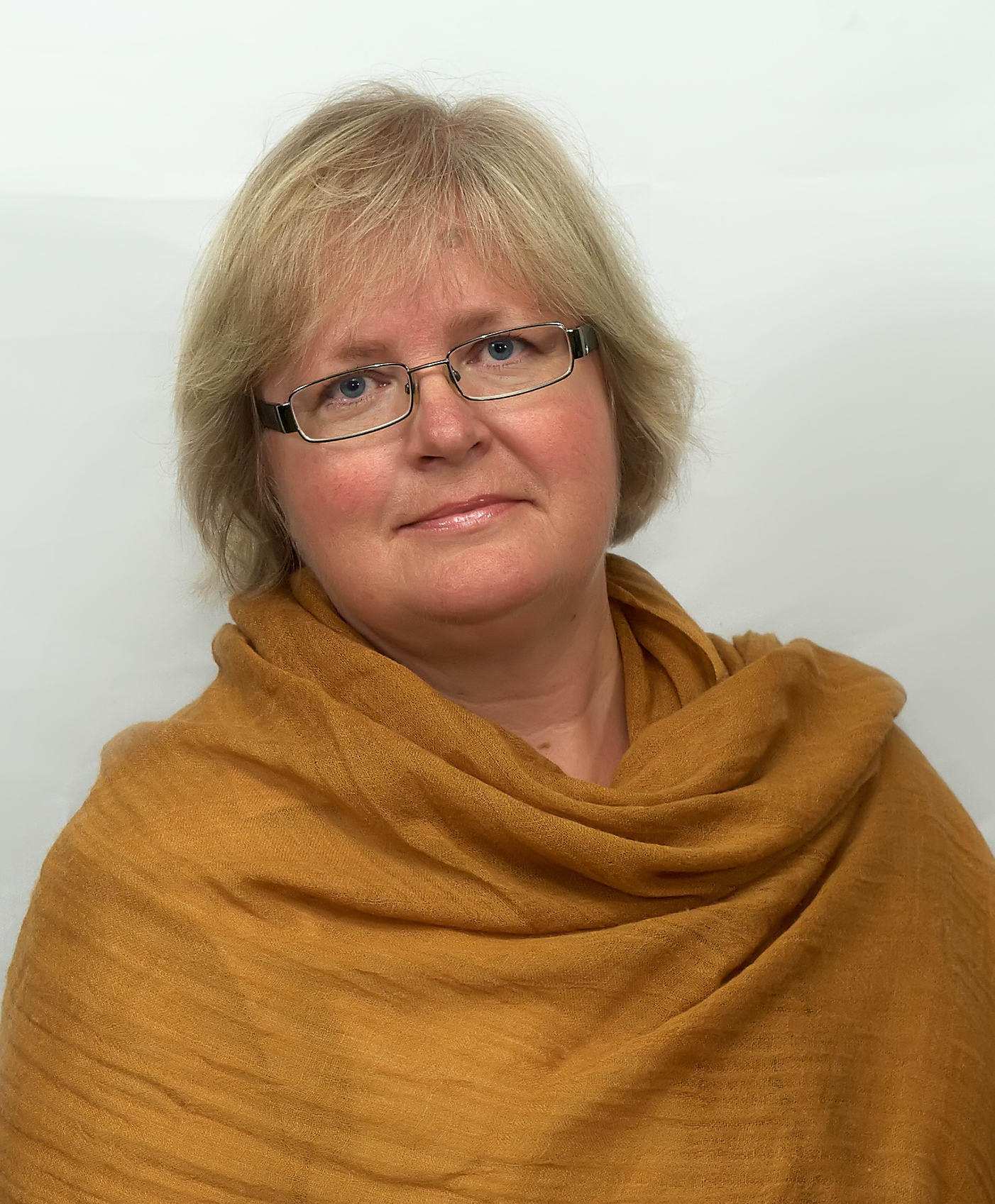
- Born: 4 February 1961 (age 65); Tallinn, then part of Estonian SSR, Soviet Union

Kadri Jäätma (born 4 February 1961 in Tallinn) is an Estonian ceramicist, actress and politician. She was a member of IX Riigikogu.

In 1979, Jäätma appeared as the daughter Liina in the Sulev Nõmmik directed comedy film Siin me oleme!. She later went to become a potter and ceramicist. She has been a member of Pro Patria Union.

== Gallery ==
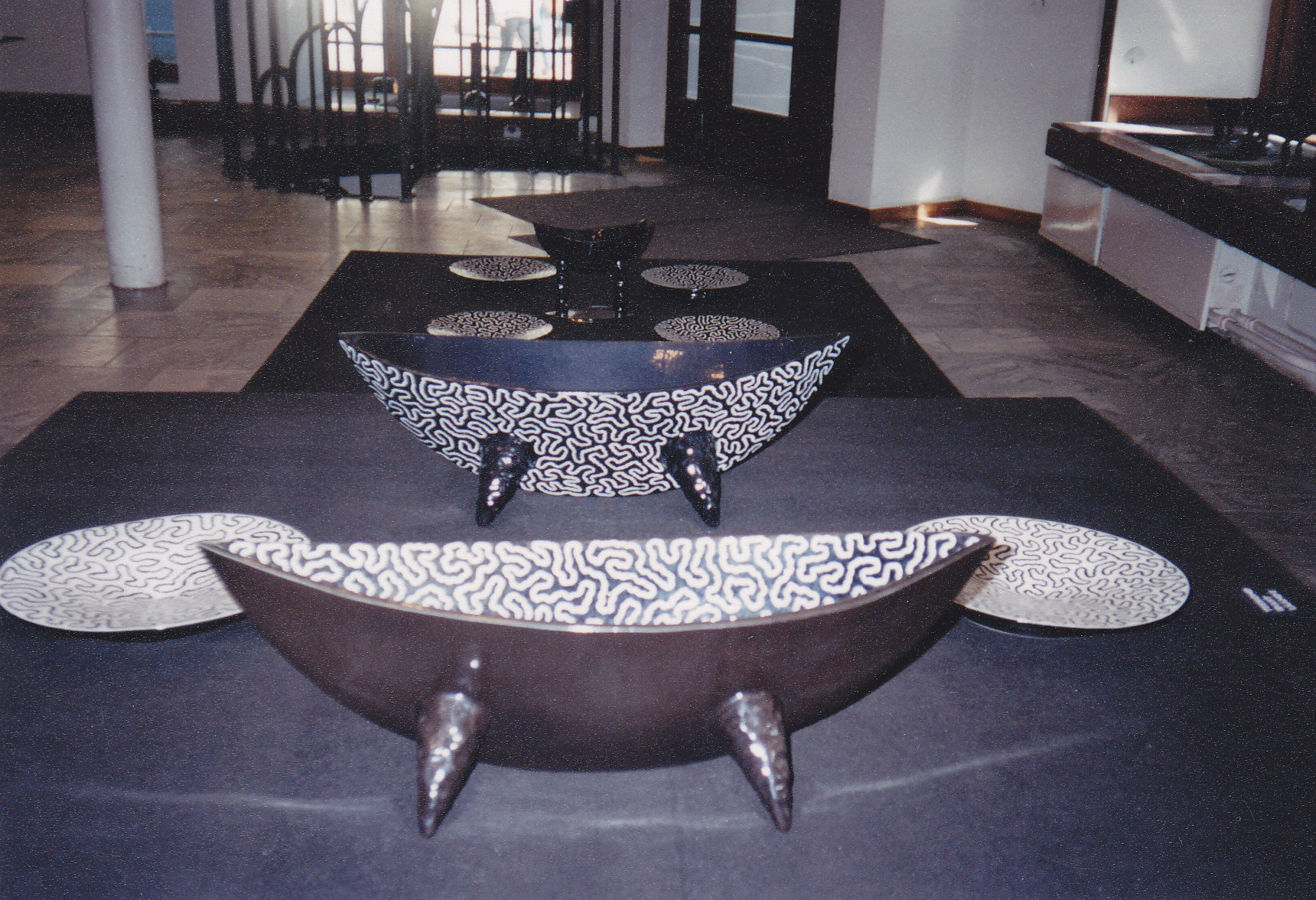
Exhibition at the Galerii Molen, Tallinn (1993)

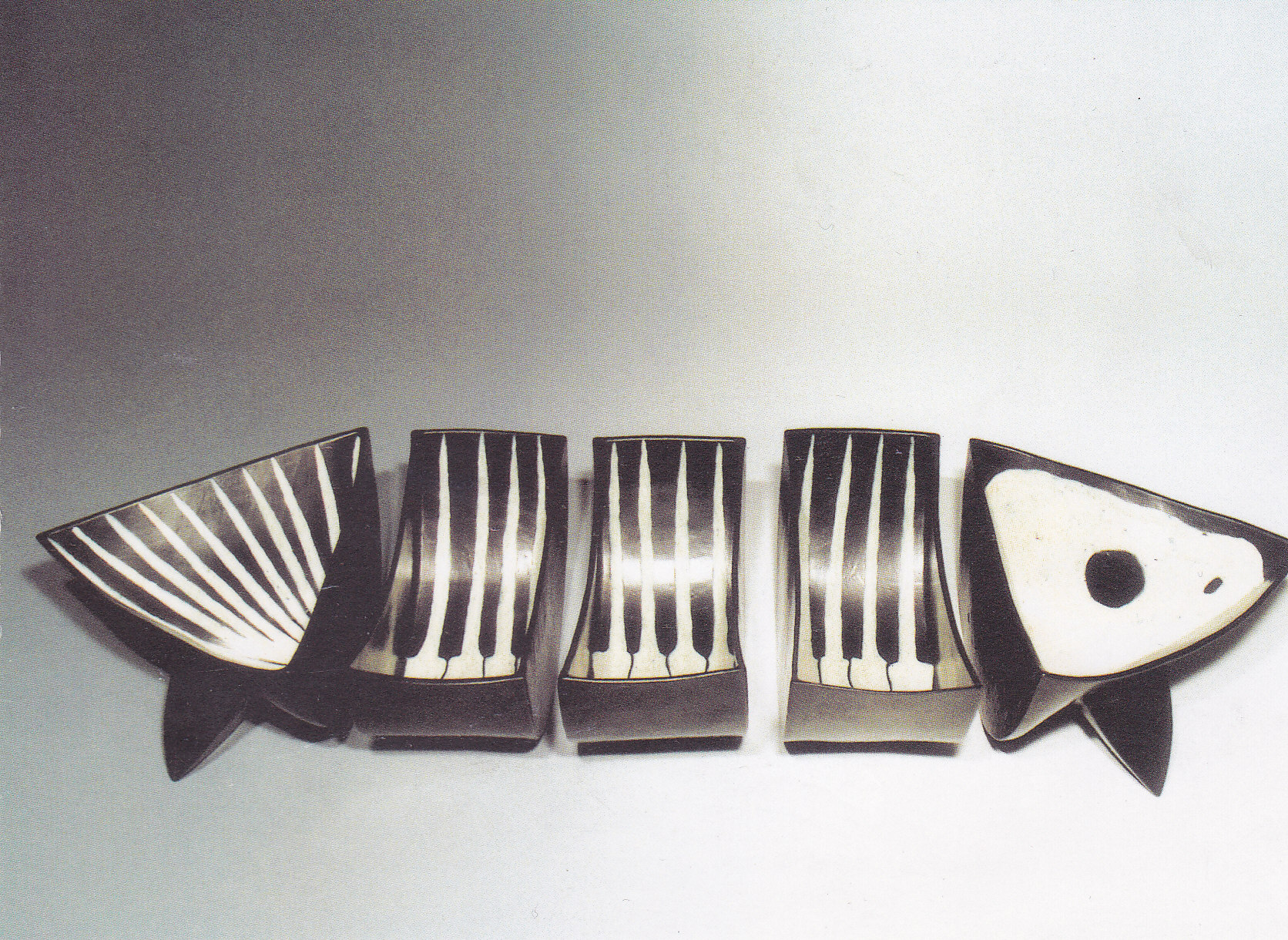
Kalade aeg (1996)

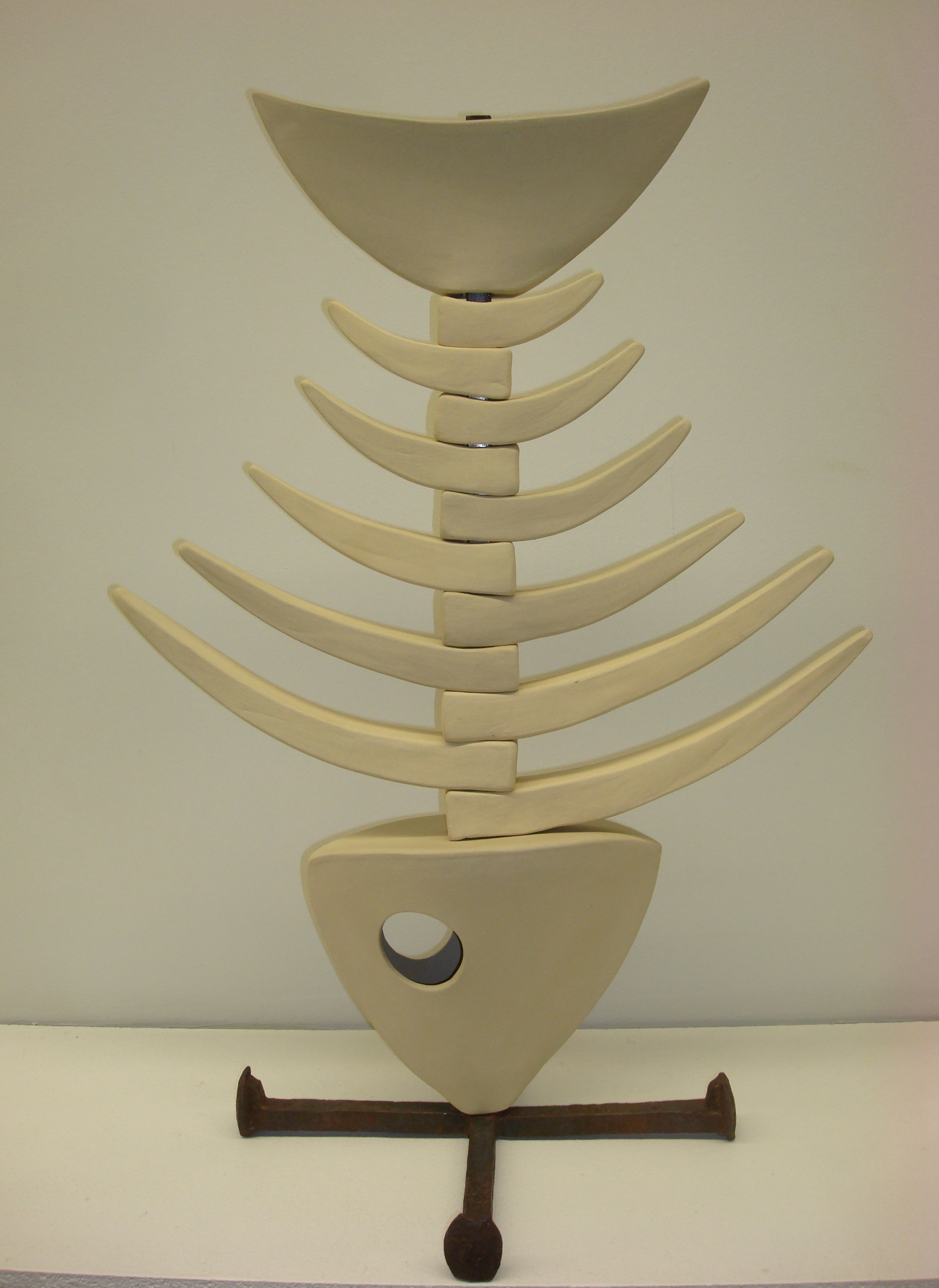
Kalaroots (2011)

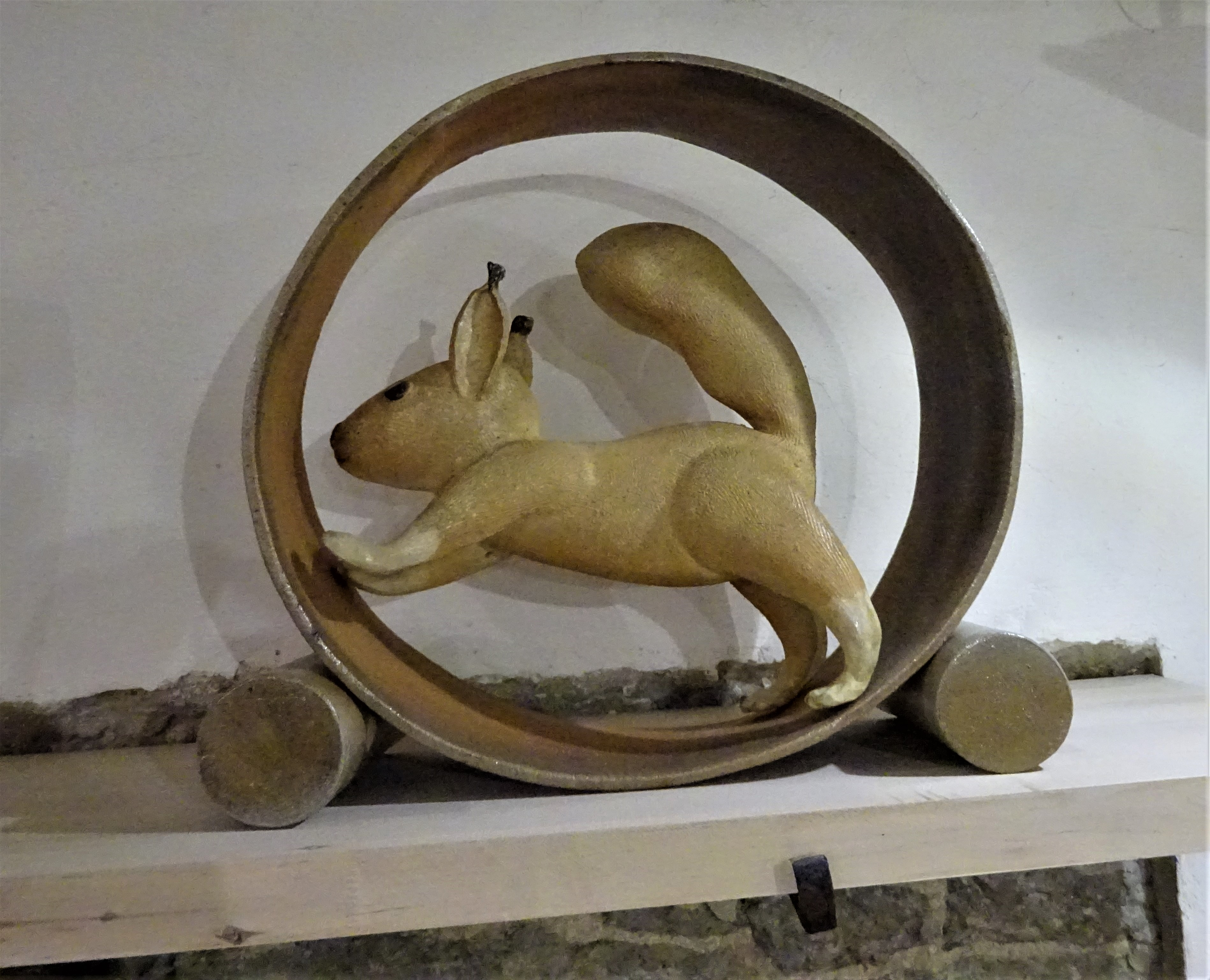
Nagu orav rattas (2015)
