= Ingvar Pärnamäe =

Estonian politician (born 1977)

Ingvar Pärnamäe (born 27 July 1977) is an Estonian politician and civil servant. He served as a member of the IX Riigikogu from 1999 to 2002. Elected at the age of 21, he is youngest Member of Parliament in the country's history.

He was a member of the Pro Patria and Res Publica Union (known as Isamaa since 2018) from 1995 to 2017.
