= Tomberg =

Tomberg can refer to:

- Tomberg metro station. Brussels
- Jevgeni Tomberg (1948–2021), Estonian politician
- Richard Tomberg (1897–1982), Estonian military Major General
- Valentin Tomberg (1900–1973), Russian Christian mystic and scholar
- The Tomberg Family Philanthropies, A nonprofit grant making organization
