= Ruusmann =

Ruusmann is a surname. Notable people with the surname include:

- Ants Ruusmann (1935–2009), Estonian historian and politician
- Maido Ruusmann (born 1983), Estonian politician
