= Mari-Ann Kelam =

Estonian politician (born 1946)

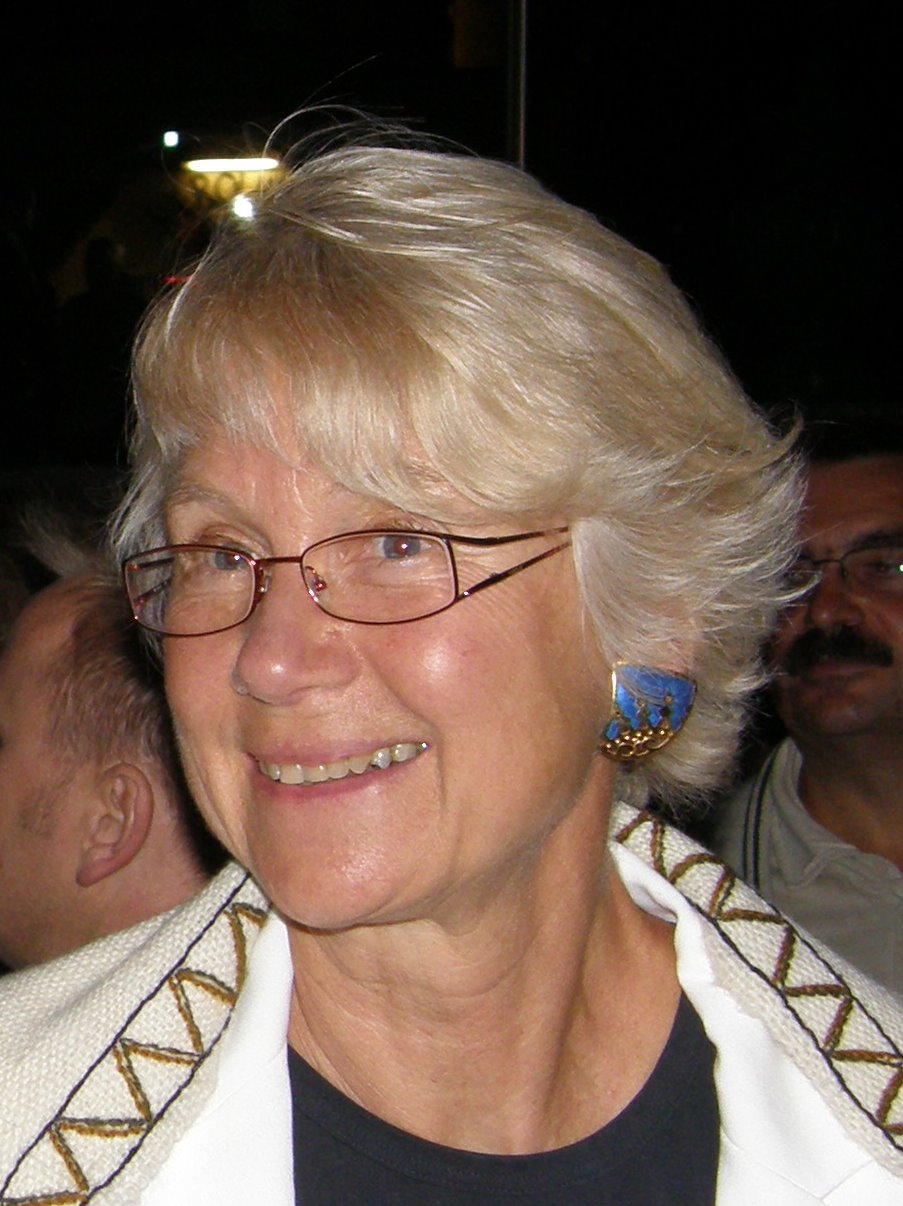
Mari-Ann Kelam

Mari-Ann Kelam (born 26 June 1946 in Ansbach, Germany) is an Estonian politician. She was a member of IX Riigikogu.

She has been a member of Pro Patria Union.
