= Laine Tarvis =

Estonian politician (1937–2024)

Laine Tarvis (née Laine Aaslaid; 26 September 1937 – 12 September 2024) was an Estonian politician. She was a member of IX Riigikogu. She was a member of Estonian Centre Party. Tarvis died on 12 September 2024, at the age of 86.
