= Jaak-Hans Kuks =

Estonian politician (1942–2019)

Jaak-Hans Kuks (12 September 1942 in Tallinn – 23 February 2019) was an Estonian politician. He was a member of IX Riigikogu.
