= Rainis Ruusamäe =

Estonian politician (1965–2020)

Rainis Ruusamäe (8 September 1965 – 4 March 2020) was an Estonian politician. He was a member of IX Riigikogu.

He was born in Võru and graduated in 1991 from the Estonian Agricultural Academy with a degree in mechanical engineering.
