= Toivo Jürgenson =

Estonian politician

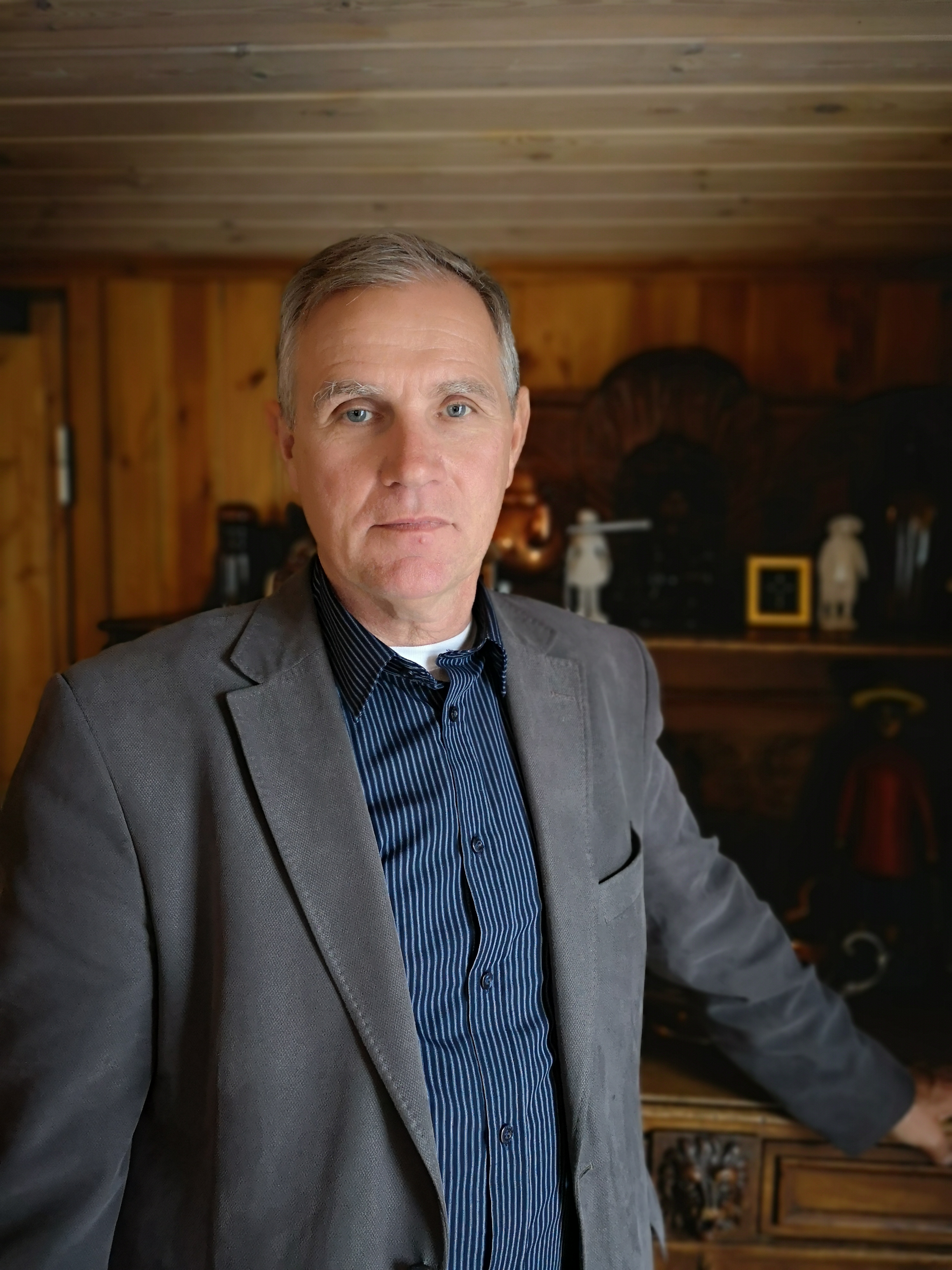
Toivo Jürgenson in 2019

Toivo Jürgenson (born 28 August 1957 in Tallinn) is an Estonian engineer, entrepreneur and politician. He was a member of the VII, VIII and IX Riigikogu, representing the Pro Patria Union party.

1994-1995 he was Minister of Economic Affairs and 1999-2002 Minister of Road and Communications.
