= Viive Rosenberg =

Estonian politician

Viive Rosenberg (née Viive Aadusoo; born 12 February 1943 in Kambja, Tartu County) is an Estonian agricultural scientist and politician. She was a member of IX Riigikogu.

She has been a member of Estonian Centre Party.
