= Liis Klaar =

Estonian sociologist and politician

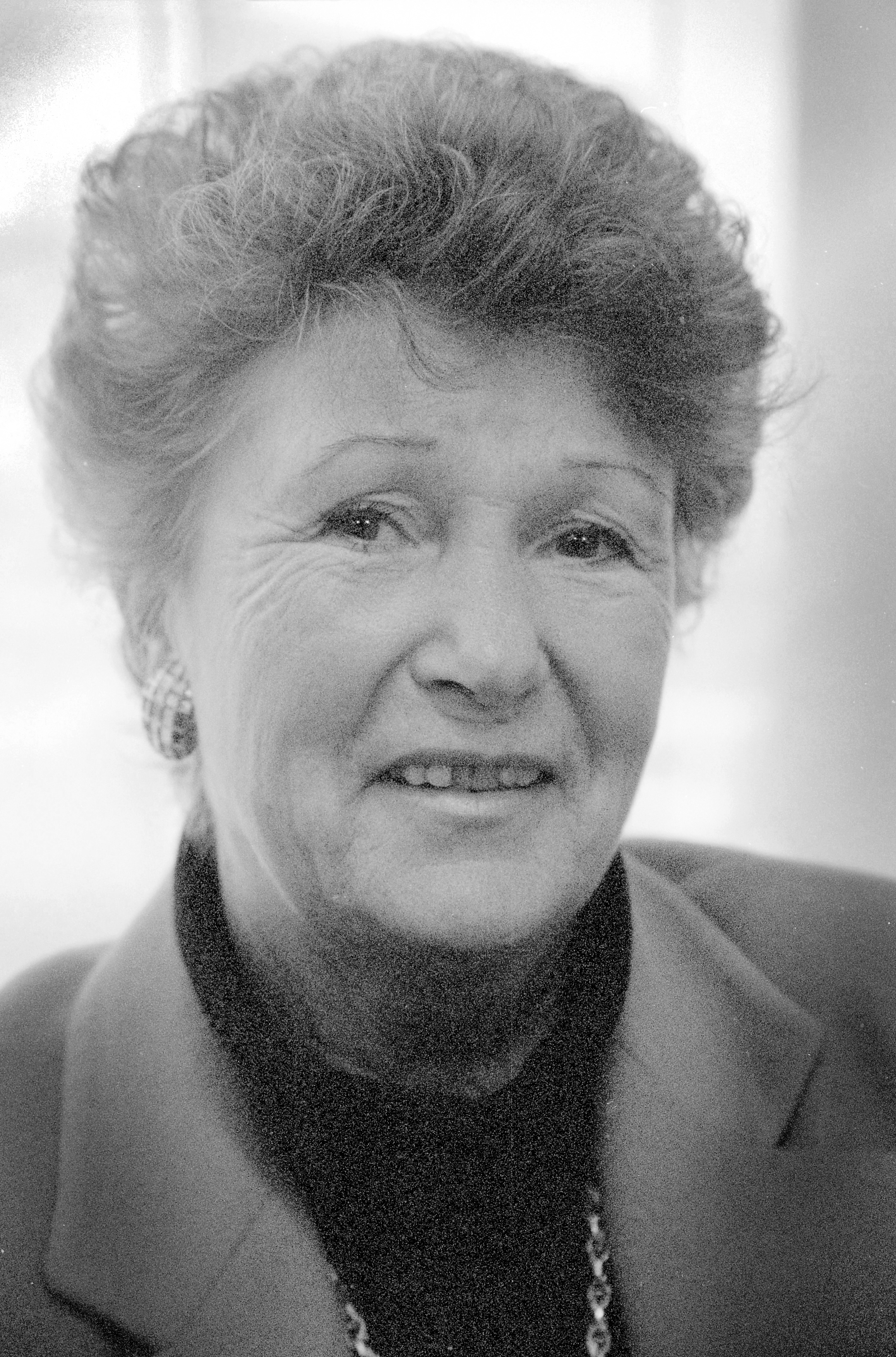
Liis Klaar

Liis Klaar (née Liis Kõll; born 25 January 1938 in Tallinn) is an Estonian sociologist and politician. She was a member of IX Riigikogu, representing the Social Democratic Party.
