= Rein Voog =

Estonian politician (born 1964)

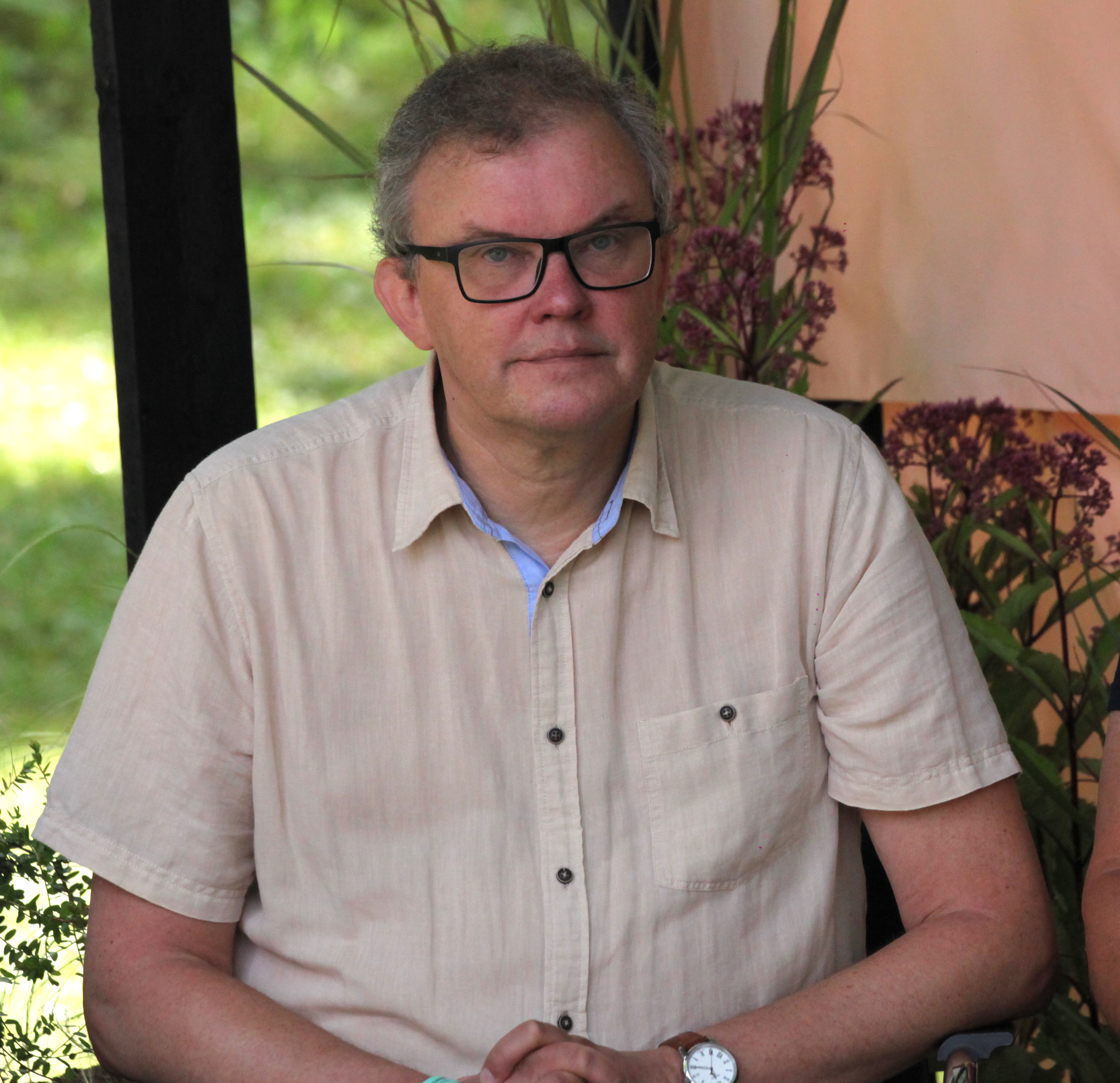
Rein Voog at the Opinion festival in Paide, Estonia (August 2021)

Rein Voog (born 2 November 1964 in Tallinn) is an Estonian politician. He was a member of IX Riigikogu.

He has been a member of the Estonian Reform Party.
