= Tõnu Kauba =

Estonian physician and politician

Tõnu Kauba (born 4 March 1952 in Rapla) is an Estonian neurologist and politician. He was a member of the VIII, IX and IX Riigikogu.

He has been a member of Estonian Centre Party.
