= Valentina Võssotskaja =

Estonian engineer-technologist and politician (born 1944)

Valentina Võssotskaja (born 28 May 1944 in Baku) is an Estonian engineer-technologist and politician. She was a member of IX Riigikogu.

In 1967, she graduated from Azerbaijan State Oil Academy.

She has been a member of United People's Party of Estonia.
