= Kalle Jürgenson =

Estonian astrophysicist and politician

Kalle Jürgenson (born 1 September 1960 in Tallinn) is an Estonian astrophysicist and politician. He was a member of VII, VIII and IX Riigikogu, and the Mayor of Elva from 1998 until 1999.
