= Sergei Jürgens =

Estonian politician

Sergei Jürgens is an Estonian politician. In 2009, he attempted to create a unified list of Russian minority candidates for the 2009 European Parliament election, but failed. From 2011 to 2012, he was Chairman of the Constitution Party.
