= Enn Tarto =

Estonian politician (1938–2021)

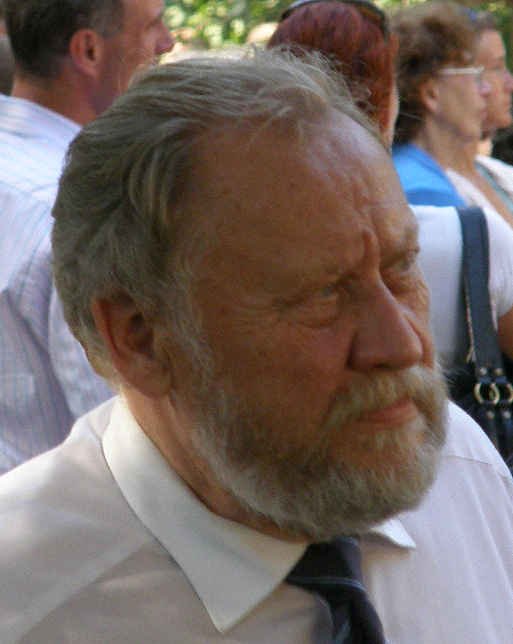
Enn Tarto in 2007

Enn Tarto (25 September 1938 – 18 July 2021) was an Estonian politician who was a leading dissident during the Soviet occupation of Estonia. He was imprisoned from 1956 to 1960, 1962 to 1967, and again from 1983 to 1988 for anti-Soviet activity.

== An anti-Soviet dissident ==
Tarto was born in Tartu. He was involved in nationalist activities since his youth. On 4 November 1956, Tarto and other members of the Estonian Youth Brigade (Eesti Noorte Malev) distributed leaflets in support of Hungarian Revolution, 1956. The message reached the West and via Western broadcasts, the students of Moscow State University. Some of these students plus lecturers were expelled for approving the Hungarians. Later, Tarto met some of these in a prison in Mordovia. For his action, Enn Tarto has been awarded the Officer Cross of the Merit Order of the Hungarian Republic. After being imprisoned twice, Enn Tarto studied from 1969 to 1971 in Tartu University Estonian philology. As Tarto was accepted by the university, a KGB man dealing with Tarto told him: 'We've already used stick, let's try now carrot as well'. Tarto was exmatriculated in 1971 in connection with his patriotic thinking and actions.

During the late 1970s, when Yuriy Andropov's anti-dissident campaign was at its peak, the dissidents of the three occupied Baltic republics decided to send a joint memorandum to the UN and the major powers. The petition, known as the Baltic Appeal, was directed to the governments of the two German states, the USSR, signatories of the Atlantic Charter and the Secretary General of the UN (Kurt Waldheim). The petition called for the elimination of the consequences of the pact and for self-determination and independence for the Baltic nations. The petition was signed by 37 Lithuanians, four Estonians and four Latvians. It was handed over to Western representatives in Moscow, August 1979. On 23 August 1979, Baltic Appeal was approved by well-known Moscow dissidents, academic Andrei Sakharov, Viktor Nekipelov, Tatyana Velikanova, Malva Landa and Arina Ginzburg. Provided with these names, the document reached West, thus signed by fifty people. A reaction by the international community was the Resolution of the European Parliament, 13 January 1983.

Enn Tarto was also one of these who publicly demanded the USSR move its troops away from Afghanistan. Enn Tarto was also active in teaching other dissidents on surviving in the conditions of a totalitarian regime. In the course of anti-dissident slander in 1980s, the authorities called Enn Tarto a teacher and leader of the "Anti-Soviet elements". In 1984, the Supreme Court of the Estonian SSR sentenced Tarto to ten years plus five years deprivation of civic rights, stating that he was an especially dangerous "anti-social recidivist". Enn Tarto was finally released on 17 October 1988, after public protests in Estonia and a demand by 45 US congressmen. (4 October 1988).

== After release ==
Having been released from captivity, he took actively part in Estonia’s process of regaining independence. He participated in the radical pro-independence movement (while not being a member of ERSP) and was elected deputy of Congress of Estonia (Eesti Kongress). Tarto was one of the organisers of the protest march around the Soviet military base near Tartu on 8 March 1989. Tartu had co-ordinated it with Dzhokhar Dudayev, who was serving there as the chief of garrison.

Enn Tarto together with Linnart Mäll took part in founding the Unrepresented Nations and Peoples Organization, was chairman of the Estonian Society of Pan-Europe, and chairman of council of the Estonian Human Rights Institute from 1992 to 1995. He participated in the re-founded Estonian Defence League activities and in organisations promoting the commemoration of the victims of totalitarian regimes.

Tarto was elected three times to Riigikogu (1992, 1995, 1999), from town of Tartu or Tartu and Jõgeva region. Tarto was a member of the Riigikogu from 1992 to 1995 (Fatherland Union), from 1995 to 1999 (Right-wingers) and 1999 to 2003 (People's Party Moderates).

In 2005, Enn Tarto decided to leave SDE, which had chosen the line of collaborating with the People's Union (a joint list for Tallinn city council election), which mostly unites former communist party officials.

He was a candidate for Tartu town council in Fatherland Union list (2005 election).

Tarto was elected three times to Tartu town council (1999, 2002, 2005).

Enn Tarto also publicly condemned the top collaborators with the Communist regime and the executors of the Communist repressions in Estonia.

Enn Tarto was awarded numerous medals by the institutions of the Republic of Estonia, including Order of the National Coat of Arms (2nd class) and the highest award by the Estonian Defence League (Eesti Kaitseliit), White Cross medal (1st rate). Valdas Adamkus awarded him the Officer Cross of the Vytis Cross Order.

Tarto died on 18 July 2021 at the age of 82.

== Documentary ==
- Andres Sööt, Alone and Together (Üksinda ja koos), 2002
