= Ants Ruusmann =

Estonian historian and politician

Ants Ruusmann (19 March 1935, Ristiküla – 25 December 2009) was an Estonian historian and politician. He was a member of IX Riigikogu.

He was a member of Estonian Centre Party.
