= Urmas Laht =

Estonian politician (born 1955)

Urmas Laht (born 7 July 1955 in Loksa) is an Estonian politician. He was a member of IX Riigikogu.

He has been a member of Estonian Centre Party.
