= People's Party of Republicans and Conservatives =

Defunct political party in Estonia

People's Party of Republicans and Conservatives (Vabariiklaste ja Konservatiivide Rahvaerakond) was an Estonian political party, which existed under this banner from 1994 to 1998.

== History ==
It was founded in September 1994 after Pro Patria split and some national conservative members left, including Enn Tarto. The founders of the new party were mostly former members of the Conservative People's Party and the Republicans' Coalition Party (these two parties had formed the Isamaa (Pro Patria) electoral cartel in 1992, together with the Christian Democratic Party and the Christian Democratic Union).

The People's Party of Republicans and Conservatives contested the 1995 parliamentary election under the banner of Right-wingers (Parempoolsed). The list got 27,053 votes (5.00%) and thus managed to pass the threshold, gaining five seats in the Riigikogu. The party remained in opposition throughout the four-year term.

In May 1998, the party merged with the non-parliamentary Peasant's Party (Talurahvaerakond), forming the new People's Party (Rahvaerakond). Toomas Hendrik Ilves was chosen as the first party leader. As the new party was unlikely to pass the Riigikogu threshold of 5%, it was soon decided to co-operate with possible partners. The People's Party decided to participate in the 1999 election as part of the Moderates' list, which led to a couple of nationalists leaving the party (e.g. Mart Nutt, who joined the Pro Patria Union list). The People's Party and the Moderates merged on 27 November 1999, forming the People's Party Moderates.

After election disasters in 2002 and 2003, this party reformed and renamed itself the Sotsiaaldemokraatlik Erakond.
