= Vambo Kaal =

Estonian politician (born 1949)

Vambo Kaal (born 12 March 1949 Pöide Parish, Saare County) is an Estonian politician. He was a member of VII, VIII and IX Riigikogu. From 2003 to 2009, he was the mayor of Kiili.
