= Arvo Jaakson =

Estonian politician (1942–2019)

Arvo Jaakson (15 July 1942 in Halinga Parish – 10 August 2019) was an Estonian politician. He was a member of IX Riigikogu.

He has been a member of Estonian Centre Party.
