= Mart Meri =

Estonian politician (born 1959)

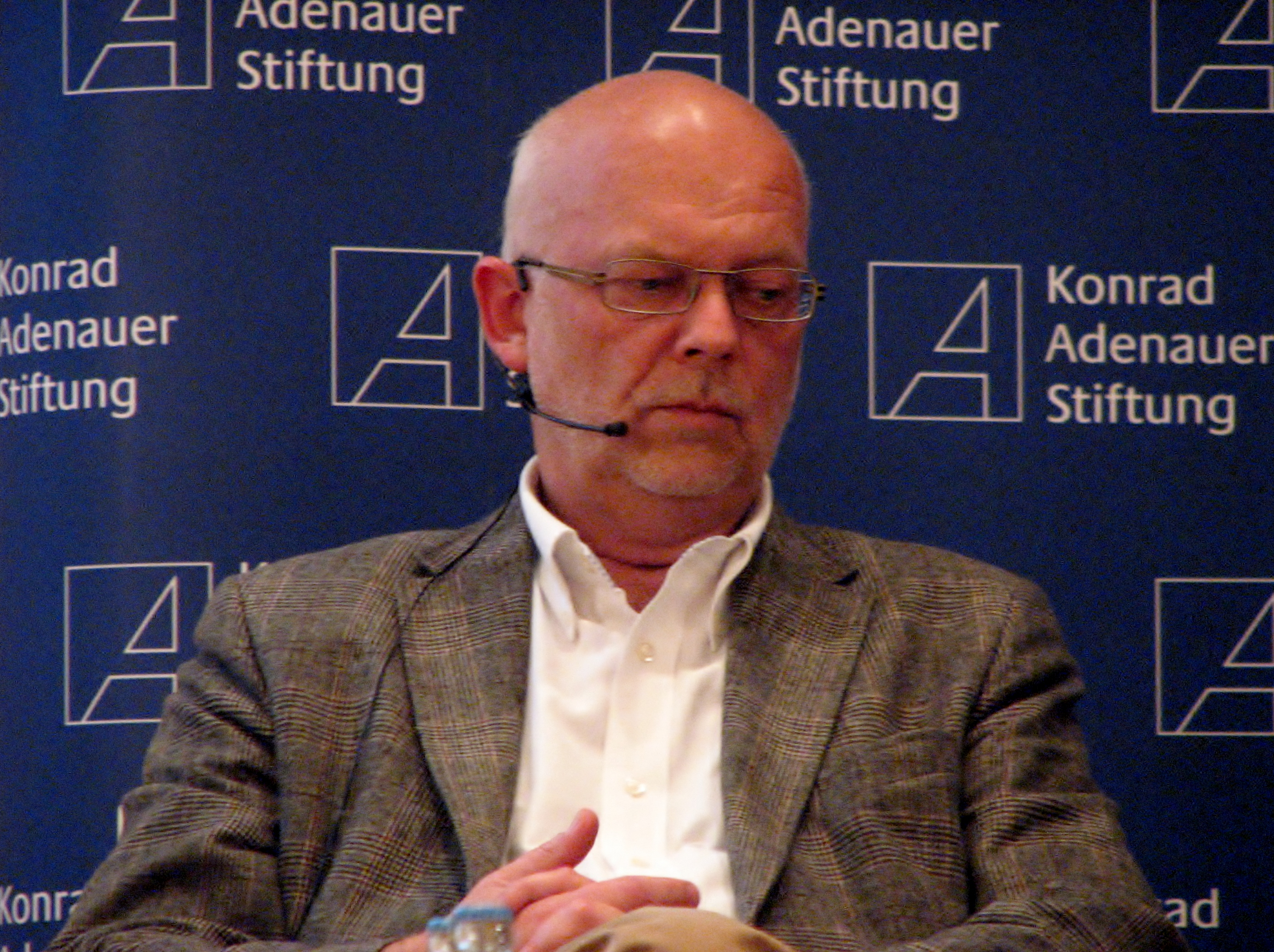
Mart Meri

Mart Meri (born 15 February 1959 in Tallinn) is an Estonian politician. He was a member of IX, X and XII Riigikogu.

His father was Lennart Meri and his mother was Regina Meri.
