= Jevgeni Tomberg =

Estonian politician (1948–2021)

Jevgeni Tomberg (14 June 1948 – 30 April 2021) was an Estonian politician. He was a member of the Riigikogu and served in the IX Riigikogu from 1999 till 2003.

== Early life ==
Tomberg was born in Kirov Oblast to Aksel Tomberg, an Estonian farmer from Lääne County who had been deported on 24 June 1941 to Russia by Soviet authorities, and his Russian wife Tanja, who had been deported to the area with her family from Moscow. He was an only child. In 1958, following the death of Joseph Stalin and the Khrushchev Thaw, the family were permitted to return to Estonia and they settled in Pärnu, where Tomberg attended school. After graduating from secondary school, Tomberg enrolled at the Tallinn Polytechnic Institute, (now, the Tallinn University of Technology), where he studied electrical network systems.

== Career ==
Tomberg was a member of the Constitution Party and the Estonian People's Party. He was active in the Eastern Orthodox Church and was one of the founders of the Lasnamäe Orthodox Church.

== Personal life and death ==
While studying at the Tallinn Polytechnic Institute, he married his wife Irina, a Russian woman from Moscow, that he had met through his mother's relatives.

Tomberg died in Tallinn from complications of COVID-19 during the COVID-19 pandemic in Estonia. He was 72.
