= Toomas Varek =

Estonian politician (born 1948)

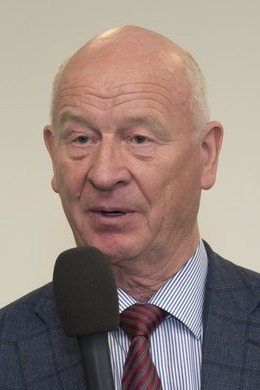
Toomas Varek in 2014

Toomas Varek (born in 1948 in Rakvere) is an Estonian politician. He has been a member of IX, X and X Riigikogu. In 2003 he was Minister of the Interior of Estonia, Deputy Speaker of the Riigikogu 2005–2006 and Speaker of the Riigikogu 2006–2007.

In 1972 he graduated from Estonian Agricultural Academy.

Before 1996 he was also the managing director of Viru Õlu Brewery.

From 1996 to 1999, he was Mayor of Rakvere.

From 1997 until 2012, he was a member of Estonian Centre Party. In June 2013, he joined the Estonian Reform Party.
