= Endel Paap =

Estonian politician

Endel Paap (born 8 September 1938 in Võru Parish) is an Estonian miner and politician. He was a member of IX Riigikogu.

He has been a member of Estonian People's Party.
