= Uno Mereste =

Estonian economist and politician

Uno Mereste (born Uno-Johannes Muskat; 27 May 1928 – 6 December 2009) was an Estonian economist and politician. He was a member of VII, VIII and IX Riigikogu.
