= Liina Tõnisson =

Estonian politician (born 1940)

Liina Tõnisson (born 24 May 1940 in Tallinn) is an Estonian politician. She has been a member of VII, VIII, IX, X and XI Riigikogu.

In 1964 she graduated from Tallinn Polytechnical Institute in engineering economics.

From 1995 to 2004, she was a member of Estonian Central Party. From 1995 until 2002 she was the Minister of Economic Affairs in the second government of Tiit Vähi, and from 2002 until 2003, she was the Minister of Economic Affairs and Communications in the government of Siim Kallas.
