= Ülo Tärno =

Estonian politician (born 1936)

Ülo Tärno (born 22 May 1936 in Haapsalu) is an Estonian politician. He was a member of IX Riigikogu.

He has been a member of Estonian Centre Party.
