= Tõnu Kõiv =

Estonian politician

Tõnu Kõiv (born 4 December 1968 in Rakvere) is an Estonian politician. He was a member of IX Riigikogu.
