= Tiit Käbin =

Estonian jurist and politician

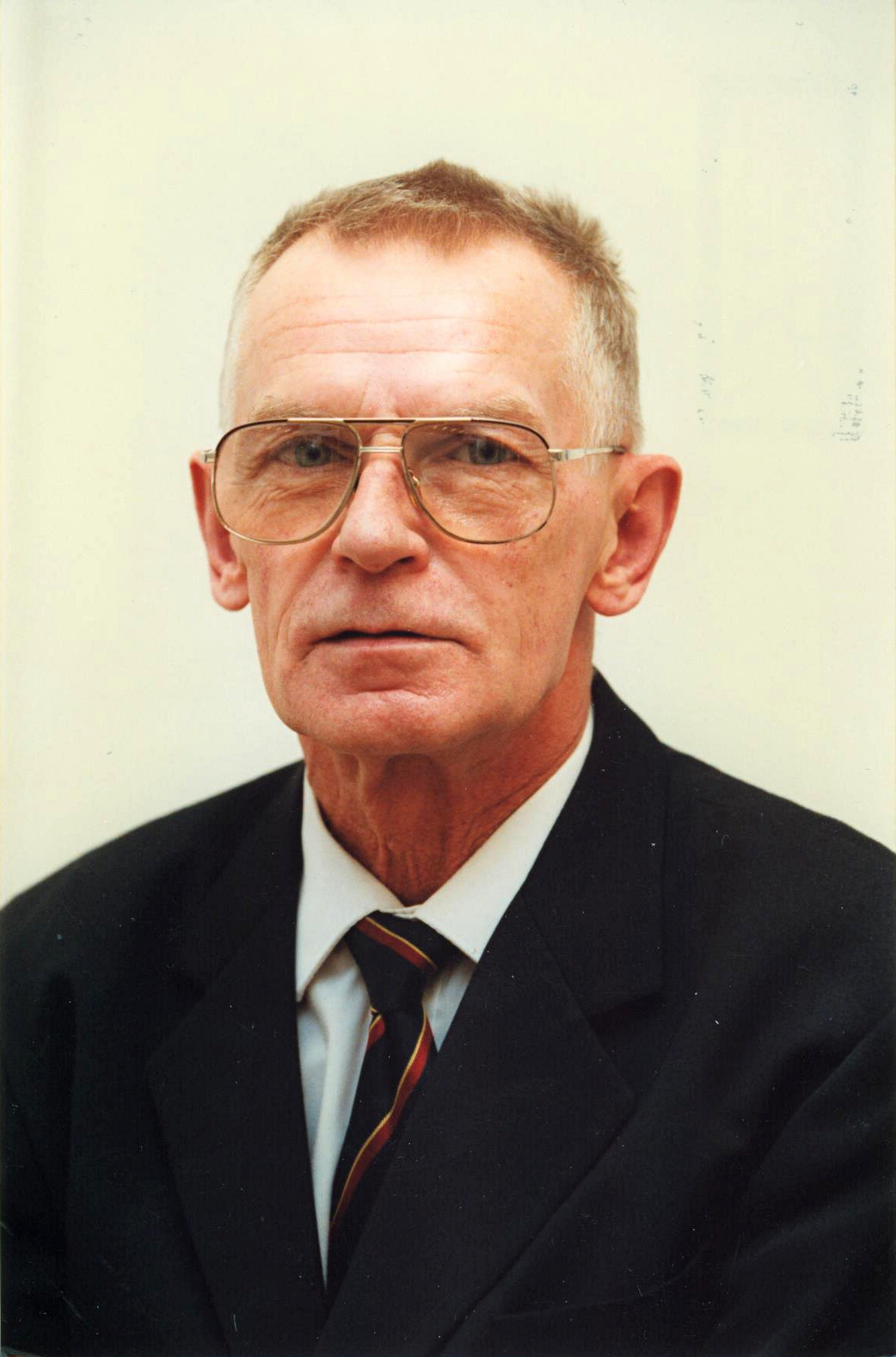
Tiit Käbin in 1998

Tiit Käbin (12 May 1937 Puka – 5 March 2011) was an Estonian jurist and politician. He was a member of the VII, VIII and IX Riigikogu.
