= Maret Maripuu =

Estonian politician (born 1974)

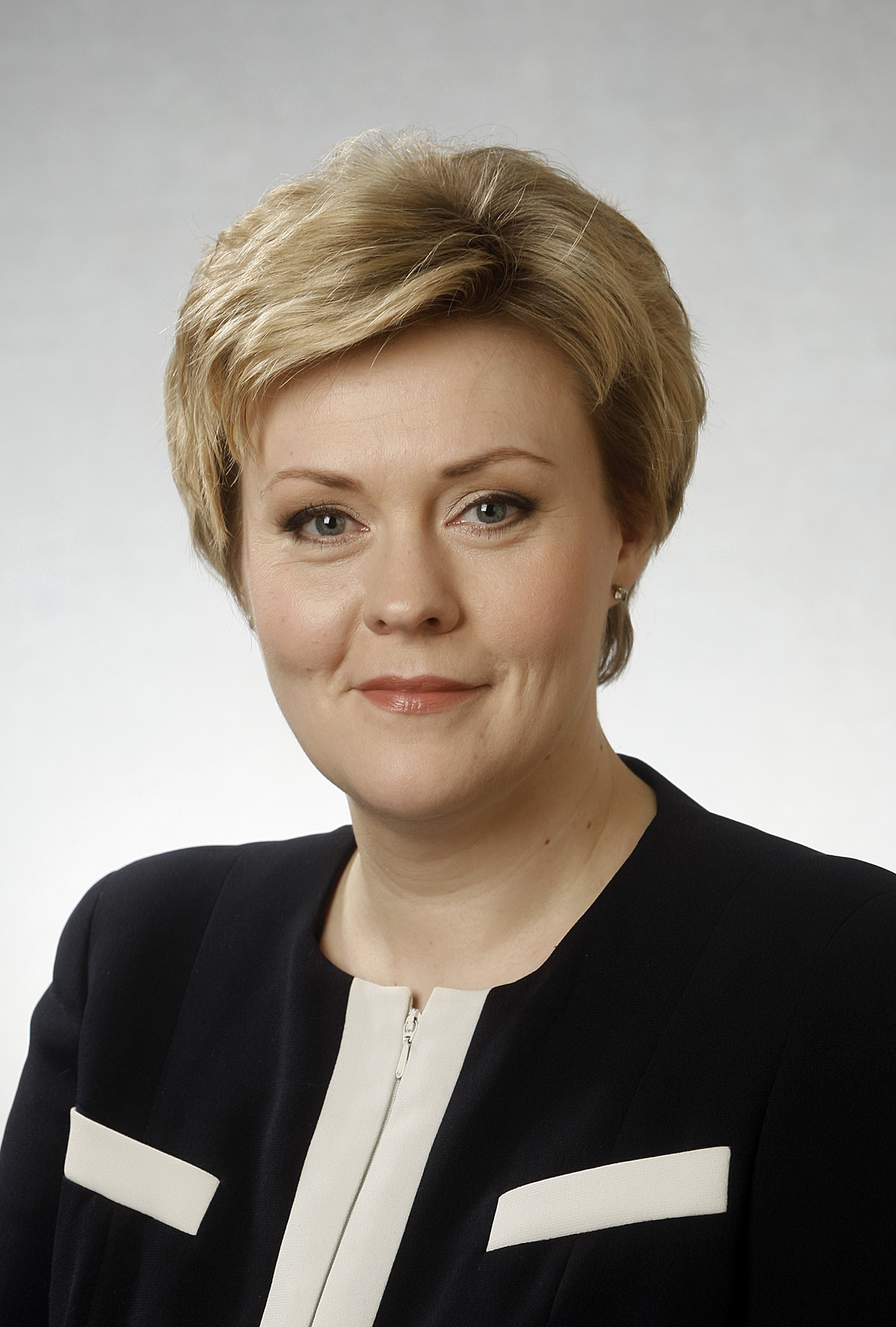
- Maret Maripuu in 2011.

Minister of Social Affairs
- In office 5 April 2007 – 23 February 2009
- Prime Minister: Andrus Ansip
- Preceded by: Jaak Aab
- Succeeded by: Hanno Pevkur

Personal details
- Born: 16 July 1974 (age 51) Tallinn, then part of Estonian SSR, Soviet Union
- Party: Estonian Reform Party

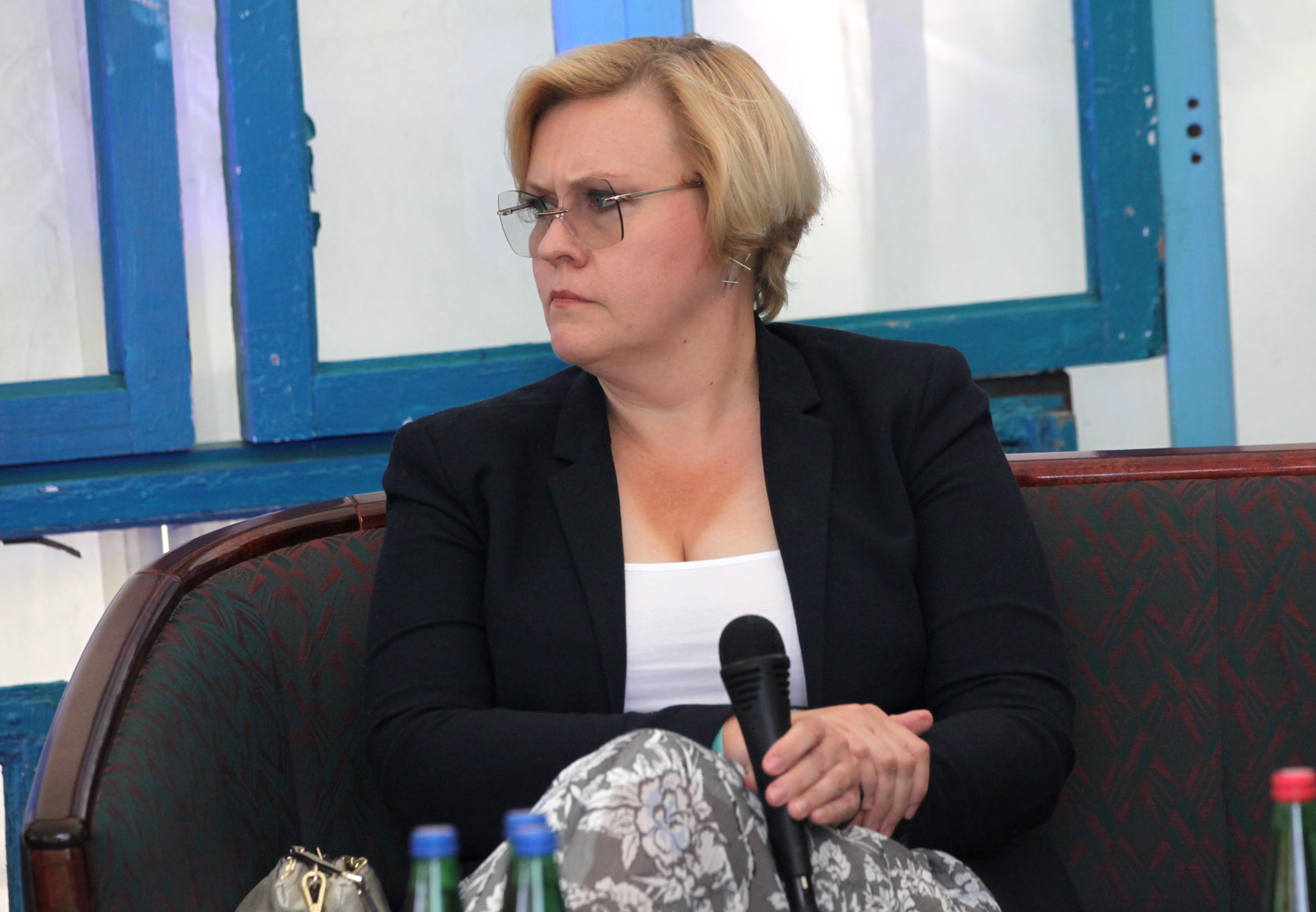
Maret Maripuu at the Opinion Festival 2021 in Paide, Estonia

Maret Maripuu (born 16 July 1974) is an Estonian politician, a member of the Reform Party.

From April 2007 until February 2009 she served as Minister of Social Affairs. Previously, she was a member of the Riigikogu from 1999 to 2007, and was Vice President of the Riigikogu from 2006 to 2007. She was also on the Tallinn City Council from 1999 to 2005, and was the chairman of the council from 2001 to 2005.

Preceded by Jaak Aab	Minister of Social Affairs of Estonia; 5 April 2007 – 23 February 2009	Succeeded by Hanno Pevkur
