= Raivo Paavo =

Estonian politician (born 1946)

Raivo Paavo (born 22 May 1946 in Lüganuse Parish, Virumaa) is an Estonian politician. He was a member of VIII Riigikogu.
