= Estonian Freedom Party – Farmers' Assembly =

Estonian political party

Estonian Freedom Party – Farmers' Assembly (Estonian: Vabaduspartei – Põllumeeste Kogu) was an Estonian political party. The chairman of the party is Rein Koch.

The party declares itself as the legal successor of Farmers' Assemblies (Estonian: Põllumeeste Kogud), which was established on 5 October 1921.

In February 2026, the party approved a merger with the Estonian Nationalists and Conservatives. In September 2026, the party was formally liquidated.
