= 1999 Estonian parliamentary election =

- 7 March 1999

101 seats in the Riigikogu 51 seats were needed for a majority
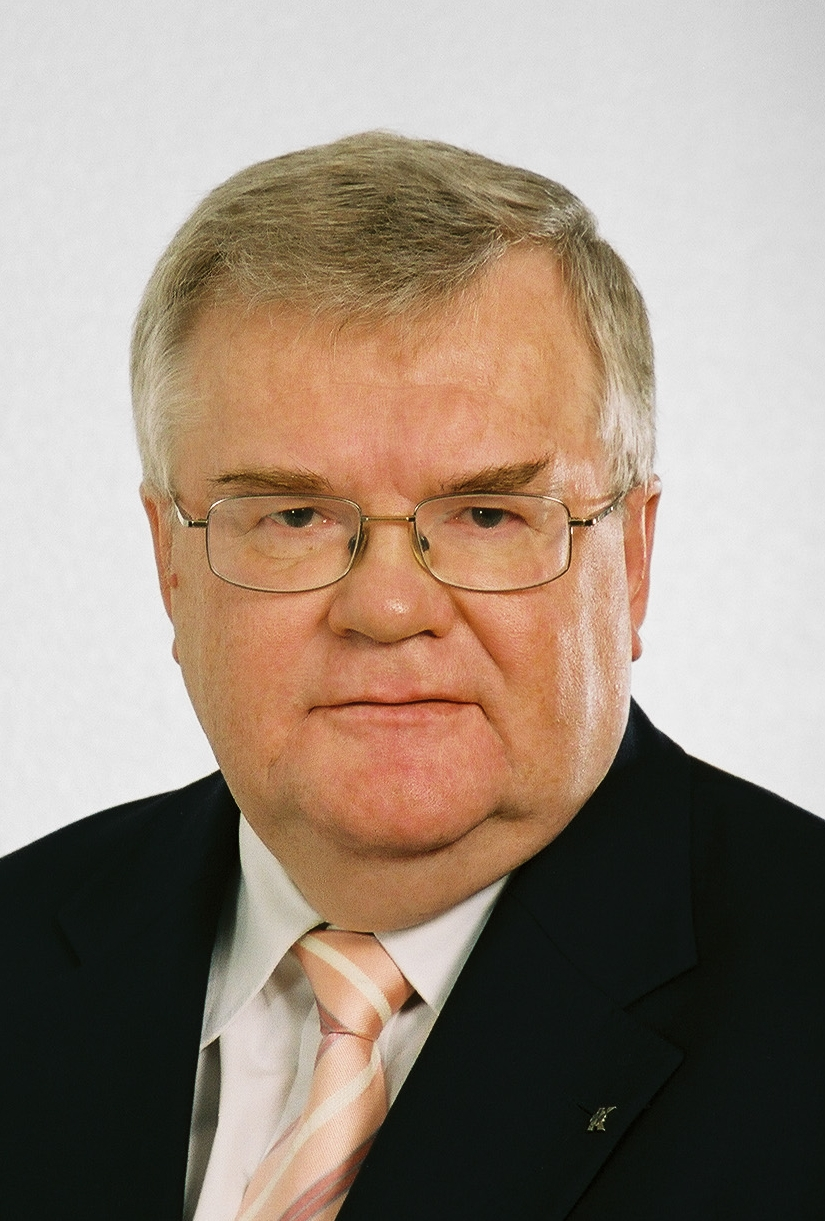

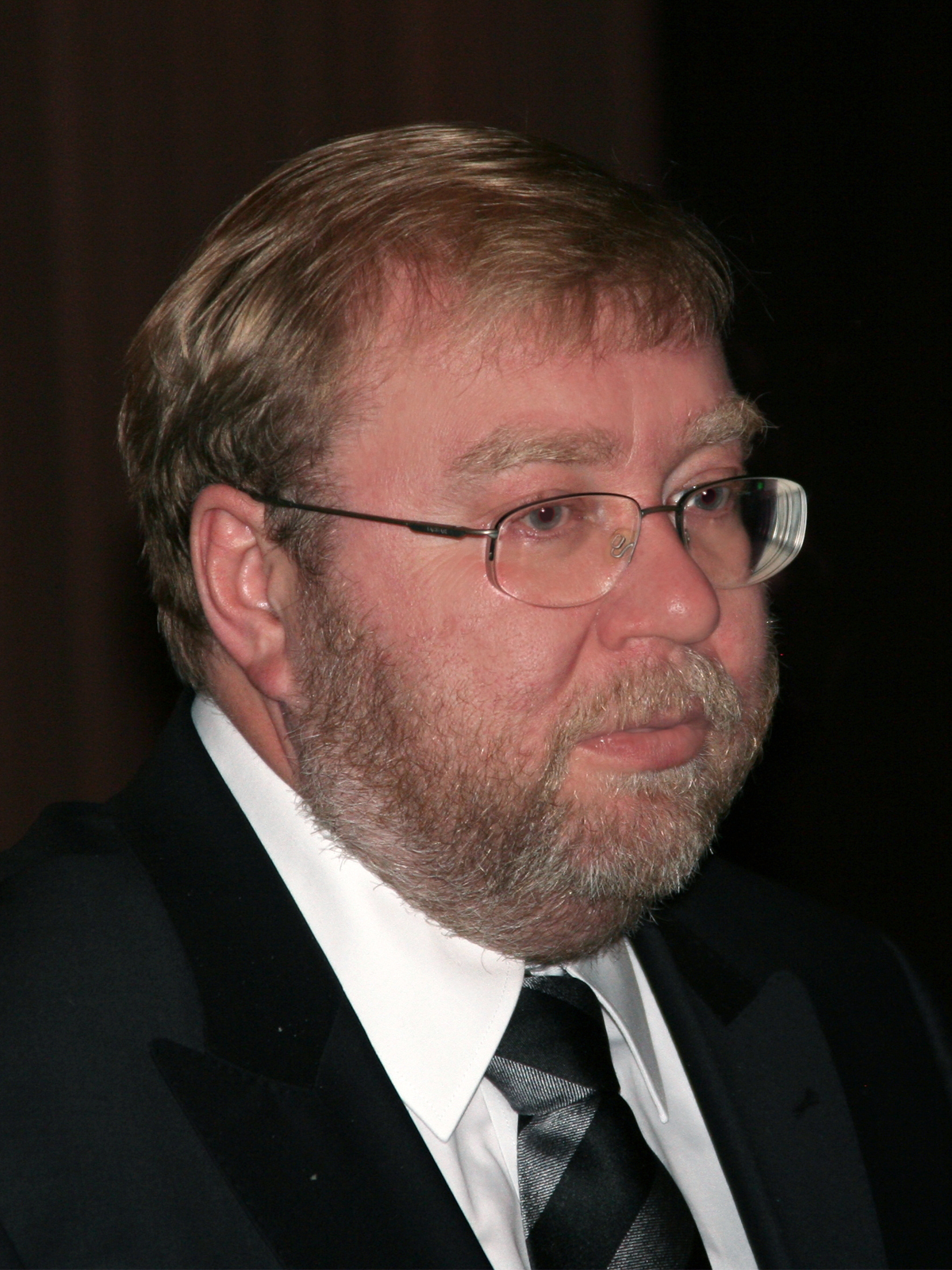

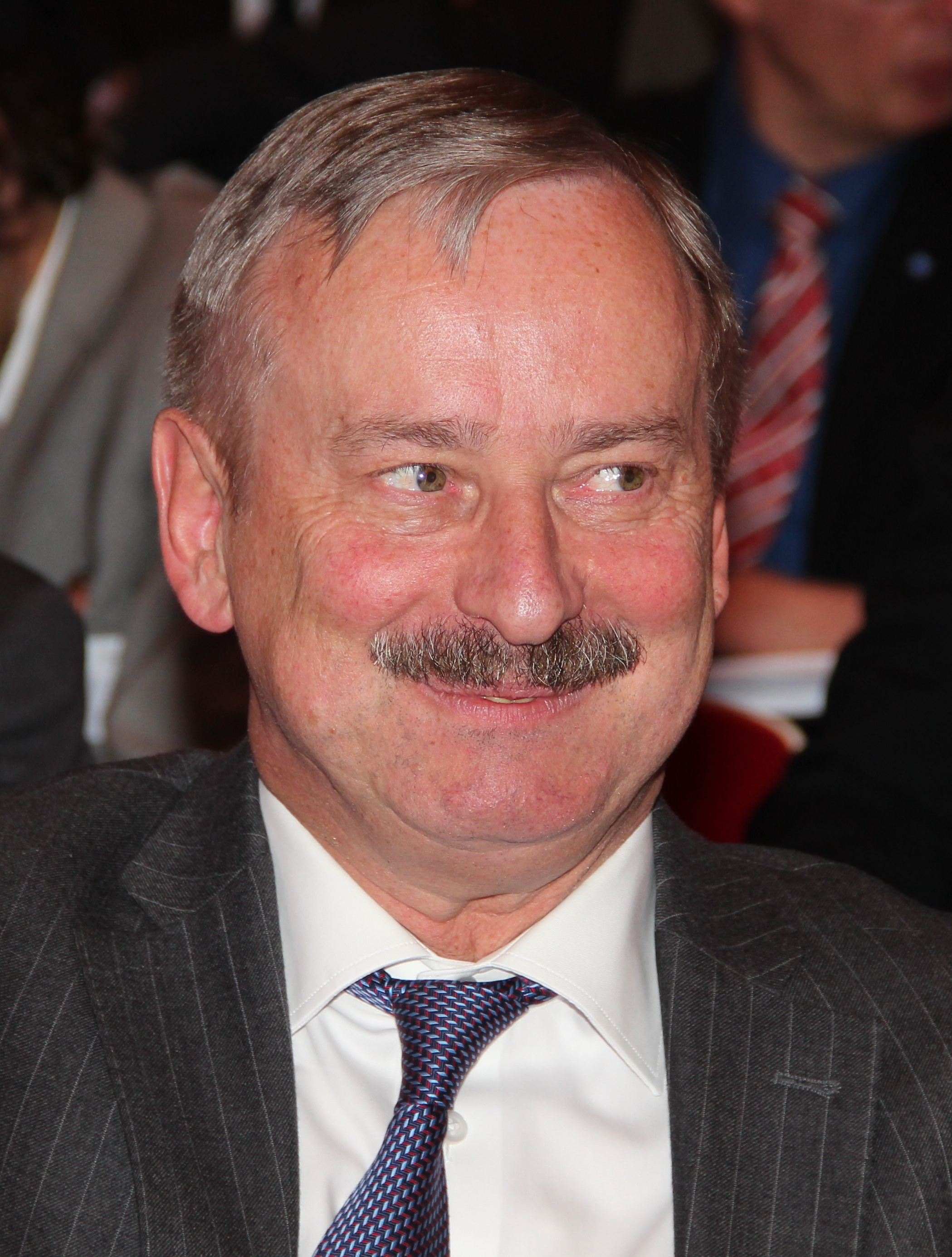

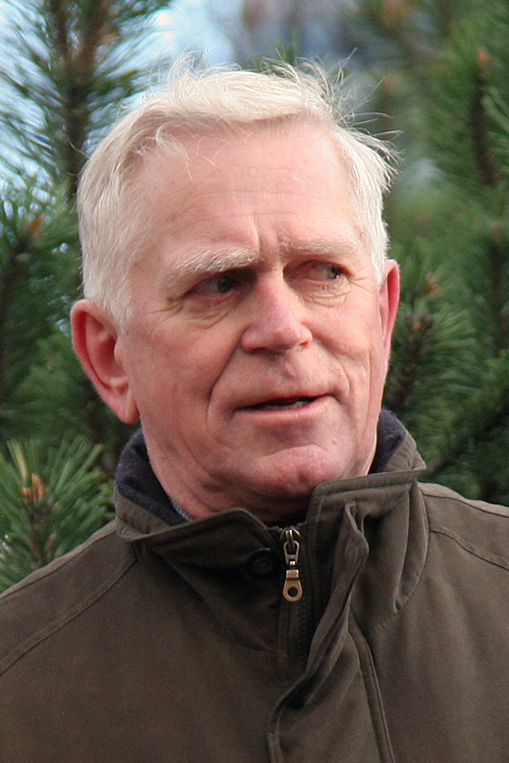
| | First party | Second party |
|---|---|---|
| Leader | Edgar Savisaar | Mart Laar |
| Party | Centre | Pro Patria Union |
| Last election | 16 seats | 8 seats |
| Seats won | 28 | 18 |
| Seat change | ▲12 | ▲10 |
| Popular vote | 113,378 | 77,917 |
| Percentage | 23.4% | 16.1% |
| Swing | ▲9.23pp | New |
| | Third party | Fourth party |
| Leader | Siim Kallas | Andres Tarand |
| Party | Reform | SDE |
| Last election | 19 seats | 6 seats |
| Seats won | 18 | 17 |
| Seat change | ▼1 | ▲11 |
| Popular vote | 77,088 | 73,630 |
| Percentage | 15.9% | 15.2% |
| Swing | ▲0.29pp | ▲9.21pp |
- Results by electoral district
Prime Minister before election
Mart Siimann
Coalition Party
Prime Minister after election
Mart Laar
Pro Patria Union

Parliamentary elections were held in Estonia on 7 March 1999. The newly elected 101 members of the 9th Riigikogu assembled at Toompea Castle in Tallinn within ten days of the election. The elections proved disastrous for the ruling Estonian Coalition Party, which won only seven seats together with two of its smaller allies. Following the elections, a coalition government was formed by Mart Laar of the Pro Patria Union, including the Reform Party and the Moderates. It remained in office until Laar resigned in December 2001, after the Reform Party had left the same governing coalition in Tallinn municipality, making opposition leader Edgar Savisaar new Mayor of Tallinn. The Reform Party and the Estonian Centre Party then formed a coalition government that lasted until the 2003 elections.

== Background ==
=== Vähi cabinets ===
After the 1995 parliamentary election, the electoral alliance made up of the Coalition Party and Country Union (KMÜ) and the Centre Party formed a government coalition. The government led by Tiit Vähi remained in office for only seven months, as KMÜ decided to end cooperation with the Centre Party due to the tape scandal in which the leader of the Centre Party Edgar Savisaar was accused of secretly recording political consultations between Prime Minister Tiit Vähi and the chairman of the Reform Party, Siim Kallas.Tiit Vähi and the KMÜ formed a new government with the Reform Party. However, Reform Party had risen in support in the meanwhile to become the most popular party in Estonia, causing tension in the government. Relations between the coalition partners became particularly sharp during the 1996 municipal elections.

After the local elections, the Coalition Party signed a cooperation agreement in Tallinn with the Centre Party, leaving the Reform Party, which came first in the elections, as the main opposition in Tallinn. As a result of that, the Reform Party decided to leave the government, forcing Tiit Vähi had to continue with a minority government. In order to expand the government's support area, Vähi appointed several independent technocrats as ministers, the most important of which was the appointment of future president Toomas Hendrik Ilves as Minister of Foreign Affairs.

=== Scandals ===
In early 1997, a significant scandal arose surrounding the privatization of several apartments in central Tallinn. The controversy arose when it was revealed that well-known figures, including Minister of Foreign Affairs Toomas Hendrik Ilves, as well as Vähi's own daughter, had acquired those living spaces for cheap prices. At the time of the transactions, Tiit Vähi was also heading the Tallinn City Council. Although Vähi narrowly survived a vote of no confidence in parliament, mounting pressure from the media prompted his resignation.

During the apartment scandal, in order to divert attention from the scandal, Vähi disclosed that the Bank of Northern Estonia (PEP) had lent 10 million dollars to the Swiss company Paradiso SAL in 1993. However, after the first interest payment, it turned out that such a company didn't exist, and the company's representatives had disappeared along with the money. Since the 10 million dollars had been lent to PEP by the Bank of Estonia, which was headed by Siim Kallas at the time, Vähi hinted that Kallas himself had stolen these millions. Criminal proceedings were started, as a result of which Siim Kallas was charged with both abuse of office and preparation for large-scale looting of state property. However, just before the 1999 election, Kallas was acquitted of all charges.

=== Mart Siimann's cabinet ===
KMÜ nominated Mart Siimann, the deputy chairman of the Coalition Party, as the new prime minister candidate. Initially, Siimann tried to form a majority government with the Reform Party and Centre Party, but was unsuccessful. Therefore, the new government only ended up including KMÜ. The government was supported by the Centre Party in the parliament.

=== Coalition preparations ===
In September 1997, the Reform Party, Pro Patria Union and Moderates signed a cooperation agreement, with which the parliamentary group 'United Opposition' was created in order to oppose the perceived populism and left-leaning economics of the KMÜ and the Centre Party. In January 1998, the Reform Party proposed to the Pro Patria Union and Moderates to come to an agreement to form a government in the event that the parties achieve a parliamentary majority in the upcoming elections. At the end of 1998, the parties signed the agreement without agreeing on an eventual prime minister.

Siim Kallas, chairman of the Reform Party, wanted the leader of the party with the most votes to become prime minister. Other political parties were initially against it due the support of the Reform Party being much higher than that of the other signatories to the agreement and Kallas' reputation being tarnished by the 10 million dollar scandal. However, eventually the parties settled on the chairman of the party with the most votes becoming the prime minister. The created coalition was nicknamed the Triple Alliance.

== Electoral system ==
The 101 members of the Riigikogu (Parliament of Estonia) were elected using a form of proportional representation for a four-year term. The seats were allocated using a modified D'Hondt method. The country was divided into eleven multi-mandate electoral districts. There is a nationwide threshold of 5% for party lists, but if the number of votes cast for a candidate exceeds or equals the simple quota (which shall be obtained by dividing the number of valid votes cast in the electoral district by the number of mandates in the district) the candidate is elected.

Electoral alliances were not allowed anymore, but it didn't prevent a party from including members of another party in its list.

| District number | Electoral District | Seats |
|---|---|---|
| 1 | Haabersti, Põhja-Tallinn and Kristiine districts in Tallinn | 8 |
| 2 | Kesklinn, Lasnamäe and Pirita districts in Tallinn | 10 |
| 3 | Mustamäe and Nõmme districts in Tallinn | 8 |
| 4 | Harjumaa (without Tallinn) and Raplamaa counties | 12 |
| 5 | Hiiumaa, Läänemaa and Saaremaa counties | 7 |
| 6 | Lääne-Virumaa and Ida-Virumaa counties | 13 |
| 7 | Järvamaa and Viljandimaa counties | 9 |
| 8 | Jõgevamaa and Tartumaa counties (without Tartu) | 8 |
| 9 | Tartu city | 8 |
| 10 | Võrumaa, Valgamaa and Põlvamaa counties | 10 |
| 11 | Pärnumaa county | 8 |

== Contesting parties ==
The Estonian National Electoral Committee announced that 12 political parties and 18 individual candidates registered to take part in the 1999 parliamentary election. Their registration numbers and order were determined by the order of registration.

| # | Name | Ideology | Political position | Leader | Total candidates | 1995 result | |
| # | Name | Ideology | Political position | Leader | Total candidates | Votes (%) | Seats |
|---|---|---|---|---|---|---|---|
| 1 | Reform Party | Classical liberalism | Centre-right | Siim Kallas | 212 | 16.2% | 19 / 101 |
| 2 | Centre Party | Populism | Centre-left | Edgar Savisaar | 242 | 14.2% | 16 / 101 |
| 3 | Moderate People's Party | Social liberalism | Centre to centre-left | Andres Tarand | 303 | 6.0% | 6 / 101 |
| 4 | Pro Patria Union | National conservatism | Right-wing | Mart Laar | 178 | 7.9% (Note: Result of the Pro Patria and ERSP electoral alliance.) | 8 / 101 |
| 5 | Country People's Party | Agrarianism | Centre to centre-left | Arnold Rüütel | 167 | 32.2% (Note: Result of the Coalition Party and Country People's Union electoral alliance.) | 41 / 101 |
| 6 | Russian Party | Russian minority interests | Syncretic | Nikolai Maspanov | 148 | 5.9% (Note: Result of the Our Home is Estonia electoral alliance with the United People's Party) | 6 / 101 |
| 7 | Farmers' Assembly | Agrarianism | Centre | Eldur Parder | 36 | 32.2% (Note: Result of the Coalition Party and Country People's Union electoral alliance.) | 41 / 101 |
| 8 | Coalition Party | Economic liberalism | Centre-right | Mart Siimann | 216 | 32.2% (Note: Result of the Coalition Party and Country People's Union electoral alliance.) | 41 / 101 |
| 9 | Christian People's Party | Christian democracy | Centre-right | Aldo Vinkel | 65 | did not exist | |
| 10 | Progress Party | Social liberalism | Centre | Krista Kilvet | 65 | did not exist | |
| 11 | United People's Party | Russia's national interests | Centre-left | Viktor Andrejev | 172 | 5.9% (Note: Result of the Our Home is Estonia electoral alliance with the Russian Party) | 6 / 101 |
| 12 | Blue Party | Cultural intelligence interests | Syncretic | Jaan Laas | 62 | 0.4% | 0 / 101 |
| — | Individual candidates | — | | | 18 | did not exist | |

== Results ==
| Party | Votes | % | Seats | +/– |
|---|---|---|---|---|
| Estonian Centre Party | 113,378 | 23.41 | 28 | +12 |
| Pro Patria Union | 77,917 | 16.09 | 18 | +10 |
| Estonian Reform Party | 77,088 | 15.92 | 18 | –1 |
| Moderates (Note: The Moderates' list included representatives of the People's Party.) | 73,630 | 15.21 | 17 | +11 |
| Estonian Coalition Party (Note: The Estonian Coalition Party list included members of the Estonian Country Union and the Party of Estonian Pensioners and Families.) | 36,692 | 7.58 | 7 | – |
| Estonian Country People's Union | 35,204 | 7.27 | 7 | – |
| Estonian United People's Party (Note: The Estonian United People's Party included members of the Estonian Social Democratic Labour Party and the Russian Unity Party.) | 29,682 | 6.13 | 6 | – |
| Estonian Christian People's Party | 11,745 | 2.43 | 0 | New |
| Russian Party in Estonia | 9,825 | 2.03 | 0 | – |
| Estonian Blue Party | 7,745 | 1.60 | 0 | 0 |
| Farmers' Assembly | 2,421 | 0.50 | 0 | – |
| Progress Party | 1,854 | 0.38 | 0 | New |
| Independents | 7,058 | 1.46 | 0 | 0 |
| Total | 484,239 | 100.00 | 101 | 0 |
| Valid votes | 484,239 | 98.35 | | |
| Invalid/blank votes | 8,117 | 1.65 | | |
| Total votes | 492,356 | 100.00 | | |
| Registered voters/turnout | 857,270 | 57.43 | | |
Source: Nohlen & Stöver

== See also ==
- Members of the 9th Riigikogu
