= Viktor Andrejev =

Estonian politician

Viktor Andrejev (born 21 November 1948 in Valga) is an Estonian politician. He was a member of VIII Riigikogu.
