= 1995 Estonian parliamentary election =

- 5 March 1995

101 seats in the Riigikogu 51 seats needed for a majority
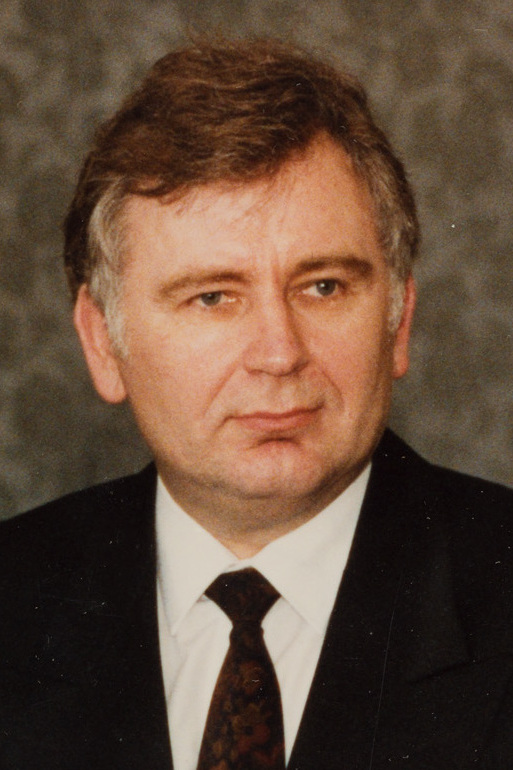

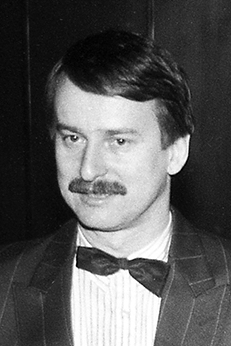

	First party	Second party	Third party
Leader	Tiit Vähi	Siim Kallas	Edgar Savisaar
Party	KE–EML	Reform	Centre
Last election	17	—	15
Seats won	41	19	16
Seat change	▲24	New	▲1
Popular vote	174,248	87,531	76,634
Percentage	32.2%	16.2%	14.2%
- Results by electoral district
Prime Minister before election
Andres Tarand
Party Moderates
Prime Minister after election
Tiit Vähi
Coalition Party

Parliamentary elections were held in Estonia on 5 March 1995. The newly elected 101 members of the 8th Riigikogu assembled at Toompea Castle in Tallinn within ten days of the election. The governing parties were heavily defeated, except for the Reform Party, the successor of Estonian Liberal Democratic Party. The biggest winner was election alliance consisting of Coalition Party and the Country Union, which won in a landslide victory. The alliance won 41 seats, achieving the best result in an Estonian parliamentary election so far as of 2023.

== Background ==
The majority of the voters were disenchanted with coalition's shock therapy policies and scandals which had already brought about the dismissal of Prime Minister Mart Laar. Laar's premiership was also characterised by internal fights between coalition partners as well as different groups in his own Fatherland party. This led to a split in 1994, when several groups left Fatherland party.

== Campaign ==
The alliance of the Coalition Party and Country Union (KMÜ), while declaring to represent "right-wing politics", ran on a populist campaign highly critical of the previous center-right governments, accusing them of injustice, pauperization of the people and selling out people's properties. "Fatherland" on the other hand asked in its programme rhetorically, "whether we would like to let to power those who led us under Soviet rule resolutely towards the abyss, do we want back bread cartons and the oppressing embrace of the great Eastern neighbour, do we want hyperinflation and pension queues? Or do we want to continue building up a free and wealthy society?". The main slogan of KMÜ was "Competence, Cooperation, Domestic Peace"; the "Fatherland" ran under slogans "Choose the Right" and "A Choice for the Thinking Person".

== Results ==
The defeat of the governing centre-right parties came as no surprise as the coalition parties had already been defeated in the 1993 local elections.

The National Coalition Party "Fatherland" and the Estonian National Independence Party formed an electoral alliance, but won only eight seats. The Right-Wingers, which included members of Fatherland splinter group Republicans’ and the Conservatives’ People's Party, managed to pass the threshold with exactly 5% share of the vote.

The Social Democrats and Rural Centre Party presented a joint list again and soon after the election formed a new party called the Moderates.

An election newcomer was Our Home is Estonia!, a Russian ethnic minority list. Among the lists that did not pass the threshold were a cartel known as the Fourth Power, formed consisting of the Royalists and Greens.

Party	Votes	%	Seats
Coalition Party and Country Union	174,248	32.23	41
Estonian Reform Party	87,531	16.19	19
Estonian Centre Party	76,634	14.17	16
RKEI and ERSP	42,493	7.86	8
Moderates (ESDP–EMK)	32,381	5.99	6
Our Home is Estonia (EÜR–VEE)	31,763	5.87	6
The Right Wingers	27,053	5.00	5
Better Estonia–Estonian Citizen	19,529	3.61	0
Estonian Future Party	13,907	2.57	0
Justice (EDTP–ÕTE)	12,248	2.27	0
Estonian Farmers' Party	8,146	1.51	0
KunRoh (ERP–ER)	4,377	0.81	0
Estonian Nationalists Central Union	3,477	0.64	0
Forest Party	3,239	0.60	0
Estonian Blue Party	1,913	0.35	0
Estonian Democratic Union	316	0.06	0
Independents	1,444	0.27	0
Total	540,699	100.00	101
Valid votes	540,699	99.06	
Invalid/blank votes	5,142	0.94	
Total votes	545,841	100.00	
Registered voters/turnout	790,392	69.06	
Source: Nohlen & Stöver

== Aftermath ==
After the election, the Coalition Party under the leadership of Tiit Vähi and the rural parties formed government coalition with the Estonian Centre Party. However, the government collapsed in the autumn of 1995 after the so-called Tape scandal. As a result, the Centre Party was replaced by the Reform Party in the government. This coalition, which suffered from internal disagreements and clashes between free-market liberal Reform Party and centre-left rural parties, ended in 1996, when the Reform Party left the government. The Coalition Party and its rural allies continued as a minority government until the next elections in March 1999. The governments under KMÜ generally continued with the free-market reforms and Western integration started under the "Fatherland" governments, with minor changes implemented.
