= Russian Party in Estonia =

Defunct political party in Estonia

Russian Party in Estonia Vene Erakond Eestis Русская партия Эстонии
- Founder: Aleksei Sorokin
- Founded: 1920
- Dissolved: 2012
- Merged into: Social Democratic Party
- Ideology: Russian minority interests Plurinationalism; Cultural autonomy
- Political position: Centre-left
- Colours: Blue

The Russian Party in Estonia (Estonian: Vene Erakond Eestis, VEE; Russian: Русская партия Эстонии) was a minor centre-left political party in Estonia, representing the Russian minority.

== History ==
The party was originally established as the Russian National Union (Estonian: Vene Rahvuslik Liit; Russian: Русский национальный союз), a right-of-centre party, in 1920. It received 1% of the national vote in the parliamentary elections that year, winning a single seat in the Riigikogu.

After Estonia regained independence after the fall of the Soviet Union the Russian Party of Estonia was established in 1994 as the legal successor to the Russian National Union. For the 1995 elections the party formed the "Our Home is Estonia" alliance with the Estonian United People's Party. The alliance won six seats.

The party ran alone in the 1999 elections, receiving 2% of the vote but failing to win a seat. The 2003 elections saw the party's vote share fall to just 0.2% as it remained without representation in the Riigikogu. It received 0.2% of the vote again in the 2007 elections and 0.9% in the 2011 elections, failing to win a seat on either occasion.

In 2012 the party merged into the Social Democratic Party.

== Election results ==
=== Riigikogu ===
Election	Votes	%	Seats	+/–	Status
1920	8,623	1.8 (#9)	1 / 100	–	Opposition
1995	31,763	5.87 (#6)	6 / 101	–	Opposition
1999	9,825	2.03 (#9)	0 / 101	▼6	Extraparliamentary
2003	990	0.20 (#11)	0 / 101	Steady	Extraparliamentary
2007	1,084	0.20 (#10)	0 / 101	Steady	Extraparliamentary
2011	5,029	0.87 (#7)	0 / 101	Steady	Extraparliamentary
