= Constitution Party (Estonia) =

Political party in Estonia

Constitution Party Konstitutsioonierakond
- Leader: Sergei Jürgens
- Founded: 1994
- Dissolved: June 28, 2008
- Merged into: Estonian United Left Party
- Headquarters: Estonia a pst 3/5, 10143 Tallinn
- Ideology: Russian minority interests
- Political position: Centre-left
- Colours: Blue, Orange

The Constitution Party (Estonian: Konstitutsioonierakond), known until 11 February 2006 as the Estonian United People's Party (Eestimaa Ühendatud Rahvapartei), was a political party in Estonia, mainly supported by the Russian minority.

For the 1995 elections, the party formed the "Our Home is Estonia" alliance with the Russian Party in Estonia. The alliance won six seats.

The party held six seats in the Riigikogu from 1999 to 2003. At the legislative elections of 2 March 2003, it won 2.2% of the popular vote and got no seats. In 2007's election, it fell further to 5,470 votes (1.0%) and again got no seat; Estonian Internal Security Service alleged there was an active promotion campaign by Russian special services.

On 28 June 2008, it merged with the Estonian Left Party to form the Estonian United Left Party.

== Controversy ==
According to the Estonian Internal Security Service the Constitution Party was a puppet-party supported and controlled by Russia, created by the Russian Foreign Intelligence Service (SVR) as part of their campaign of "political intelligence manipulations". Also, several members of the party have connections with groups such as Nochnoy Dozor.

== Election results ==
Election	Votes	%	Seats	+/–	Government
1995	31,763	5.87 (#6)	6 / 101		Opposition
1999	29,682	6.13 (#7)	6 / 101		Opposition
2003	11,113	2.25 (#7)	0 / 101		Opposition
2007	5,464	0.99 (#8)	0 / 101		Opposition
