= Party of Estonian Christian Democrats =

Estonian political party

Party of Estonian Christian Democrats Erakond Eesti Kristlikud Demokraadid
- Leader: Aldo Vinkel
- Headquarters: Ahtri 12, tuba 204; Tallinn 10151
- Membership (2014): 1,680
- Ideology: Christian democracy Euroscepticism
- European affiliation: European Christian Political Party
- Colours: Blue, Red

Website
- http://www.ekd.ee/

The Party of Estonian Christian Democrats (Erakond Eesti Kristlikud Demokraadid), formerly known as the Estonian Christian People's Party (Eesti Kristlik Rahvapartei) was a political party in Estonia, which is not represented in the Riigikogu (parliament). In 2012, the party was declared bankrupt by a court, therefore it cannot participate in elections.

It is a Christian-conservative party which is opposed to the European Constitution and campaigned against Estonia joining the EU. The party is a member of the European Christian Political Party (ECPP).

== Party in elections ==
At the 2003 legislative elections, the party won 1.1% of the popular vote (5,275 votes) and no seats. In the 2007 parliamentary election, this improved to 9,443 (1.7%), but still fell far short of the 5% threshold.

In the 2002 local council elections, the EKRP was elected in three local councils out of 247 and collected seven seats. In Kuressaare, it collected one seat out of 21 (5.6% share of votes; 294 votes), in Pihtla Parish two seats out of 11 (24.7% share of votes; 163 votes) and in Püssi, four seats out of 13 (31.8% share of votes; 191 votes).

In the 2005 local council elections, the EKRP took part in 13 local elections out of 227 and collected three seats. In the whole country, the party collected 1799 votes which made up 0.36% of all votes. The Party won a seat in Kuressaare (one seat out of 21; 5.4% share of votes; 264 votes) and Pihtla Parish (2 seats out of 11; 18.3% share of votes; 109 votes)

The party took part, but didn't collect any seats in these councils:

- Keila (1.6% share of votes; 57 votes)
- Ridala Parish (3.0% share of votes; 30 votes)
- Haljala Parish (2.0% share of votes; 18 votes)
- Vihula Parish (3.0% share of votes; 27 votes)
- Kaarma Parish (2.1% share of votes; 26 votes)
- Valjala Parish (8.7%; 45 votes)
- Puka Parish (1.8% share of votes; 10 votes)
- Viljandi (0.6% share of votes; 41 votes)
- Võru (3.9% share of votes; 235 votes)
- Tallinn (0.7% share of vote; 891 votes)
- Tartu (0.1% share of vote; 46 votes).

In the town of Püssi, the party never part in the elections and lost its four seats. In local elections in Estonia, the threshold is 5% of valid votes cast in the council.
