= Pro Patria Union =

Political party in Estonia

Pro Patria Union Isamaaliit
- Leader: Tõnis Lukas
- Founded: 2 December 1995
- Dissolved: 15 October 2006
- Merged into: Pro Patria and Res Publica Union
- Headquarters: Wismari 11; Tallinn 10136
- Ideology: National conservatism Christian democracy
- Political position: Centre-right
- European affiliation: European People's Party; European Democrat Union
- European Parliament group: EPP-ED
- International affiliation: Christian Democrat and People's Parties International; International Democrat Union
- Colours: Blue

Website
- www.irl.ee

The Pro Patria Union (Estonian: Isamaaliit, meaning literally Fatherland Union) was a national-conservative political party in Estonia. The party was founded on 2 December 1995 from a merger of the Estonian National Independence Party and the Pro Patria National Coalition.

On 4 April 2006, representatives of the Pro Patria Union and the representatives of Res Publica decided to merge the two parties. The merger was approved by the general assemblies of both parties in Pärnu on 4 June 2006. Although originally the name For Estonia (Eesti Eest) was considered for the united party, it was rejected. New party was officially registered on 15 October 2006 under the name Pro Patria and Res Publica Union.

According to party statements, the programme was based on Christian democracy and nationalism. Together with its predecessors the Pro Patria Union was the main force behind the economic and legal reforms in the Republic of Estonia at the beginning of the 1990s.

A party of an identical name existed before the Second World War.

== In government and opposition ==
Mart Laar, a historian, former chairman of the National Alliance "Pro Patria" and Prime Minister of Estonia from 1992 to 1994 was elected the new chairman of the party on 24 October 1998.

The party was successful on the parliamentary elections of 1999, receiving 18 seats. Its leader Mart Laar became prime minister again. His coalition government was in office till 28 January 2002.

The Pro Patria Union was a member of the European People's Party (Christian Democrats) and European Democrats (EPP-ED). The party had one seat in the European Parliament, held by Tunne Kelam, the chairman of the Pro Patria Union from 7 December 2002 to 16 April 2005.

In the 2003 parliamentary elections, they won seven seats in Riigikogu; as such, they joined the opposition. Tõnis Lukas was elected chairman of the party on 16 April 2005. Historian and archivist Aimar Altosaar was re-elected secretary general in 2005, having served in the same position from 1996 to 1999.

The party had an official newspaper called "Tribüün" (The Tribune). It was established in 2001.

For the local elections in autumn 2005, the Pro Patria Union signed a cooperation agreement with two minor parties: Union of Farmers (Põllumeeste Kogu) on 6 July 2005 and with Estonian Democratic Party (Eesti Demokraatlik Partei) on 12 July 2005. The local elections on 16 October 2005 showed a growing support for the party. The presence of the Pro Patria Union grew from no seats to seven in Tallinn City Council and remained the same (nine seats) in Tartu City Council.

In April 2006, former party leader and twice PM Mart Laar was awarded the Friedman Prize for Liberty.

== Electoral results ==
=== Parliamentary elections ===
| Election | Votes | | | Seats | | Pos. | Government |
| Election | # | % | ± pp | # | ± | Pos. | Government |
|---|---|---|---|---|---|---|---|
| 1999 | 77,917 | 16.1 | – | 18 / 101 | – | 2nd | Coalition (1999–2002) |
| 2003 | 36,169 | 7.3 | ▼8.8 | 7 / 101 | ▼11 | 5th | Opposition |

=== European Parliament elections ===
| Election | Votes | | | Seats | | Pos. |
| Election | # | % | ± pp | # | ± | Pos. |
|---|---|---|---|---|---|---|
| 2004 | 24,375 | 10.5 | – | 1 / 6 | – | 4th |
