= 9th Riigikogu =

Parliament of Estonia 1999–2003

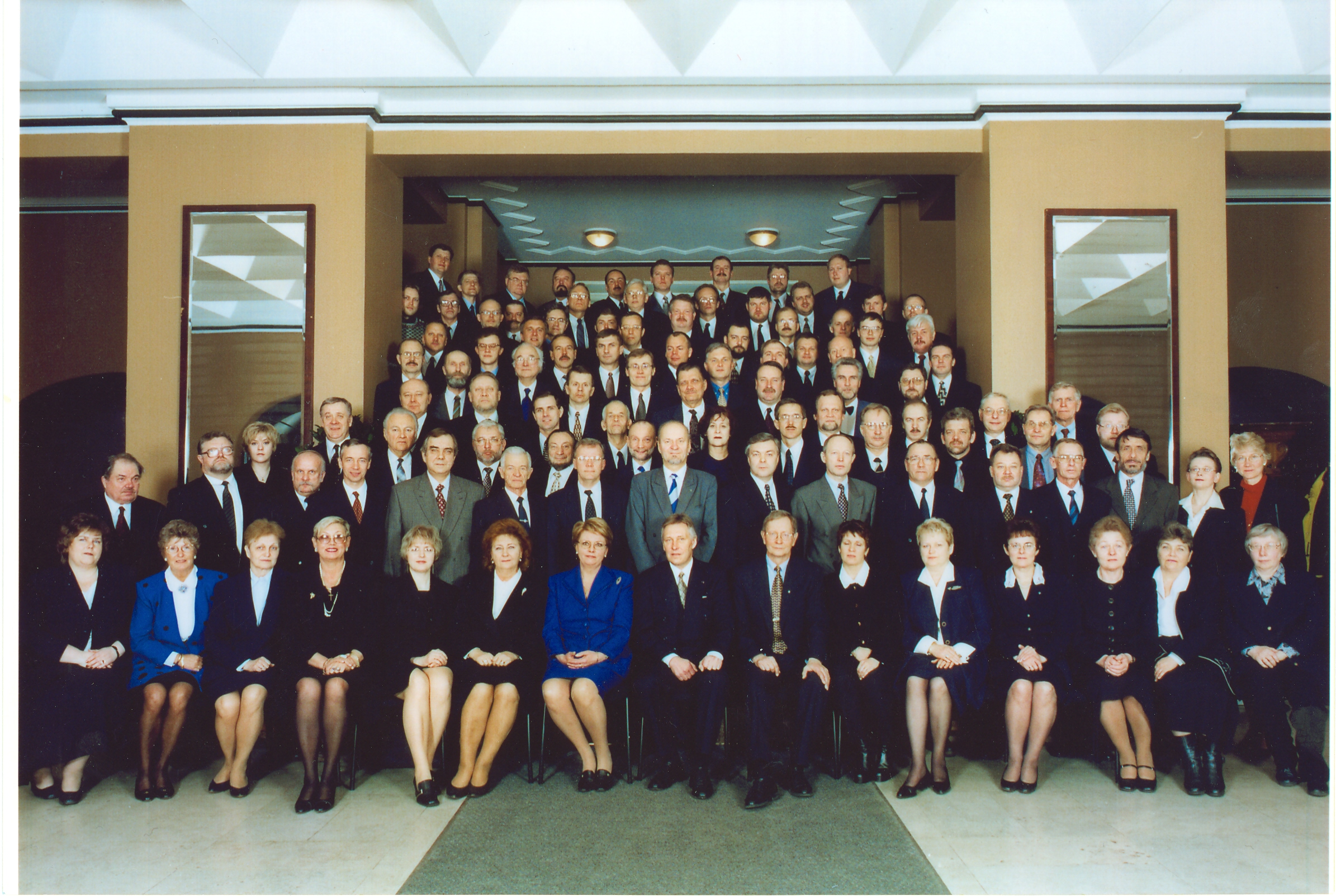
A picture of all the members

The 9th Riigikogu was the ninth legislature of the Estonian Parliament (Riigikogu). The legislature was elected after 1999 election.

== Election results ==
Party	Votes	%	Seats	+/–
Estonian Centre Party	113,378	23.4	28	+12
Pro Patria Union	77,917	16.1	18	+10
Estonian Reform Party	77,088	15.9	18	–1
Moderates ^{[a]}	73,630	15.2	17	+11
Estonian Coalition Party ^{[b]}	36,692	7.6	7	–
Estonian Country People's Union	35,204	7.3	7	–
Estonian United People's Party ^{[c]}	29.682	6.1	6	–
Estonian Christian People's Party	11,745	2.4	0	New
Russian Party in Estonia	9,825	2.0	0	–
Estonian Blue Party	7,745	1.6	0	0
Farmers' Assembly	2,421	0.5	0	–
Progress Party	1,854	0.4	0	New
Independents	7,058	1.5	0	0
Invalid/blank votes	8,117	–	–	–
Total	492,356	100	101	0
Registered voters/turnout	857,270	57.4	–	–
Source:VVK

== Officers ==
Speaker of the Riigikogu: Toomas Savi.
