= Members of the 8th Riigikogu =

This is a list of the members of the 8th Riigikogu, following the 1995 election.

== Election results ==
| Alliance | Parties | Votes | % | Seats |
|---|---|---|---|---|
| Coalition Party and Country Union | Coalition Party; Country People's Union | 174,248 | 32.2 | 41 |
| Estonian Reform Party | | 87,531 | 16.2 | 19 |
| Estonian Centre Party | | 76,634 | 14.2 | 16 |
| RKEI and ERSP | Pro Patria National Coalition; Estonian National Independence Party | 42,493 | 7.9 | 8 |
| Moderates | Social Democratic Party; Country Centre Party | 32,381 | 6.0 | 6 |
| Our Home is Estonia | Estonian United People's Party; Russian Party in Estonia | 31,763 | 5.9 | 6 |
| The Right Wingers | People's Party of Republicans; Conservatives | 27,053 | 5.0 | 5 |
| Better Estonia/Estonian Citizen | Estonian People's Hunting Party; Estonian National Progress Party; Estonian Nationalist Party; Estonian Home Party; Party of South Estonian Citizens; Party of North Estonian Citizens | 19,529 | 3.6 | 0 |
| Future Estonia Party | | 13,907 | 2.6 | 0 |
| Justice | Estonian Democratic Labour Party; Party of Legal Balance | 12,248 | 2.3 | 0 |
| Estonian Farmers' Party | | 8,146 | 1.5 | 0 |
| KunRoh | Independent Royalist Party; Party of Estonian Greens | 4,377 | 0.8 | 0 |
| Estonian Nationalists Central Union | | 3,477 | 0.6 | 0 |
| Forest Party | | 3,239 | 0.6 | 0 |
| Estonian Blue Party | | 1,913 | 0.4 | 0 |
| Estonian Democratic Union | | 316 | 0.1 | 0 |
| Independents | | 1,444 | 0.3 | 0 |
| Invalid/blank votes | | 5,142 | – | – |
| Total | | 545,825 | 100 | 101 |
| Registered voters/turnout | | 790,392 | 69.1 | – |

== Lists ==
=== By party ===
==== Coalition Party and Country Union (41) ====
| Name | Constituency |
|---|---|
| Juhan Aare | Lääne-Viru and Ida-Viru |
| Toomas Alatalu | Pärnu |
| Jaak Allik | Järva and Viljandi |
| Lembit Arro | Harju and Rapla |
| Endel Eero | Mustamäe and Nõmme |
| Vahur Glaase | Kesklinn, Lasnamäe and Pirita |
| Rein Järlik | Tartu |
| Ants Järvesaar | Pärnu |
| Ants Käärma | Järva and Viljandi |
| Raivo Kallas | Hiiu, Lääne and Saare |
| Rein Kask | Pärnu |
| Märt Kubo | Haabersti, Põhja-Tallinn and Kristiine |
| Tõnu-Reid Kukk | Haabersti, Põhja-Tallinn and Kristiine |
| Ando Leps | Lääne-Viru and Ida-Viru |
| Endel Lippmaa | Mustamäe and Nõmme |
| Peeter Lorents | Mustamäe and Nõmme |
| Harald Mägi | Lääne-Viru and Ida-Viru |
| Ilmar Mändmets | Järva and Viljandi |
| Jaanus Männik | Pärnu |
| Talvi Märja | Mustamäe and Nõmme |
| Mati Meos | Tartu |
| Aavo Mölder | Jõgeva and Tartu |
| Villu Müüripeal | Pärnu |
| Andrus Öövel | Haabersti, Põhja-Tallinn and Kristiine |
| Eldur Parder | Võru, Valga and Põlva |
| Ülo Peets | Võru, Valga and Põlva |
| Jaan Pöör | Jõgeva and Tartu |
| Villu Reiljan | Jõgeva and Tartu |
| Arnold Rüütel | Võru, Valga and Põlva |
| Mart Siimann | Kesklinn, Lasnamäe and Pirita |
| Arvo Sirendi | Harju and Rapla |
| Eino Tamm | Haabersti, Põhja-Tallinn and Kristiine |
| Juhan Telgmaa | Jõgeva and Tartu |
| Olev Toomet | Võru, Valga and Põlva |
| Mai Treial | Jõgeva and Tartu |
| Elmar Truu | Kesklinn, Lasnamäe and Pirita |
| Raoul Üksvärav | Järva and Viljandi |
| Ülo Uluots | Hiiu, Lääne and Saare |
| Tiit Vähi | Kesklinn, Lasnamäe and Pirita |
| Andres Varik | Pärnu |
| Ülo Vooglaid | Harju and Rapla |

==== Estonian Reform Party (19) ====
| Name | Constituency |
|---|---|
| Ignar Fjuk | Jõgeva and Tartu |
| Igor Gräzin | Pärnu |
| Tiit Käbin | Mustamäe and Nõmme |
| Siim Kallas | Haabersti, Põhja-Tallinn and Kristiine |
| Kaljo Kiisk | Lääne-Viru and Ida-Viru |
| Valve Kirsipuu | Järva and Viljandi |
| Heiki Kranich | Kesklinn, Lasnamäe and Pirita |
| Kalev Kukk | Mustamäe and Nõmme |
| Jürgen Ligi | Hiiu, Lääne and Saare |
| Daimar Liiv | Hiiu, Lääne and Saare |
| Andres Lipstok | Hiiu, Lääne and Saare |
| Uno Mereste | Kesklinn, Lasnamäe and Pirita |
| Aap Neljas | Tartu |
| Kristiina Ojuland | Lääne-Viru and Ida-Viru |
| Paul-Eerik Rummo | Harju and Rapla |
| Toomas Savi | Tartu |
| Andres Taimla | Järva and Viljandi |
| Feliks Undusk | Lääne-Viru and Ida-Viru |
| Toomas Vilosius | Võru, Valga and Põlva |

==== Estonian Centre Party (16) ====
| Name | Constituency |
|---|---|
| Priit Aimla | Pärnu |
| Olav Anton | Harju and Rapla |
| Arvo Haug | Haabersti, Põhja-Tallinn and Kristiine |
| Arvo Junti | Pärnu |
| Rein Karemäe | Harju and Rapla |
| Krista Kilvet | Haabersti, Põhja-Tallinn and Kristiine |
| Tõnu Kõrda | Tartu |
| Anti Liiv | Hiiu, Lääne and Saare |
| Tiit Made | Järva and Viljandi |
| Siiri Oviir | Kesklinn, Lasnamäe and Pirita |
| Valve Raudnask | Võru, Valga and Põlva |
| Aino Runge | Kesklinn, Lasnamäe and Pirita |
| Edgar Savisaar | Lääne-Viru and Ida-Viru |
| Liina Tõnisson | Mustamäe and Nõmme |
| Mart Ummelas | Mustamäe and Nõmme |
| Andra Veidemann | Tartu |

==== RKEI and ERSP (8) ====
| Name | Constituency |
|---|---|
| Jüri Adams | Haabersti, Põhja-Tallinn and Kristiine |
| Jaanus Betlem | Mustamäe and Nõmme |
| Toivo Jürgenson | Kesklinn, Lasnamäe and Pirita |
| Tunne Kelam | Mustamäe and Nõmme |
| Mart Laar | Järva and Viljandi |
| Tõnis Lukas | Tartu |
| Tiit Sinissaar | Pärnu |
| Lauri Vahtre | Tartu |

==== Moderates (6) ====
| Name | Constituency |
|---|---|
| Liia Hänni | Jõgeva and Tartu |
| Vambo Kaal | Lääne-Viru and Ida-Viru |
| Eiki Nestor | Haabersti, Põhja-Tallinn and Kristiine |
| Raivo Paavo | Kesklinn, Lasnamäe and Pirita |
| Mihkel Pärnoja | Tartu |
| Andres Tarand | Harju and Rapla |

==== Our Home is Estonia (6) ====
| Name | Constituency |
|---|---|
| Viktor Andrejev | Lääne-Viru and Ida-Viru |
| Sergei Issakov | Tartu |
| Sergei Ivanov | Kesklinn, Lasnamäe and Pirita |
| Nikolai Maspanov | Jõgeva and Tartu |
| Igor Sedašev | Kesklinn, Lasnamäe and Pirita |
| Valentin Strukov | Tartu |

==== The Right Wingers (5) ====
| Name | Constituency |
|---|---|
| Vootele Hansen | Järva and Viljandi |
| Karin Jaani | Haabersti, Põhja-Tallinn and Kristiine |
| Kaido Kama | Võru, Valga and Põlva |
| Ülo Nugis | Jõgeva and Tartu |
| Enn Tarto | Tartu |

=== By votes ===
| | Name | Votes | Party |
|---|---|---|---|
| 1. | Arnold Rüütel | 17,189 | KMÜ |
| 2. | Edgar Savisaar | 13,699 | Kesk |
| 3. | Andres Tarand | 11,422 | Mõõdukad |
| 4. | Uno Mereste | 10,806 | Reform |
| 5. | Siim Kallas | 10,459 | Reform |
| 6. | Tiit Käbin | 9,812 | Reform |
| 7. | Juhan Aare | 8,433 | KMÜ |
| 8. | Kaido Kama | 8,225 | Parem |
| 9. | Endel Lippmaa | 7,540 | KMÜ |
| 10. | Villu Reiljan | 6,800 | KMÜ |
Source: VVK
