= Riigikogu electoral district no. 9 =

Electoral district of Estonia

Electoral district no. 9
- Valimisringkond nr 9
- Electoral District for the Riigikogu
- Location of Electoral district no. 9 within Estonia
- County: Jõgeva; Tartu
- Population: 85,636 (2020)
- Electorate: 65,898 (2019)

Current Electoral District
- Created: 1995
- Seats: List: 7 (2019–present); 8 (2015–2019); 7 (2007–2015); 8 (1995–1999)
- Member of the Riigikogu: List: Peeter Ernits (EKRE); Erkki Keldo (RE); Kert Kingo (EKRE); Aivar Kokk (I); Urmas Kruuse (RE); Valdo Randpere (RE); Raivo Tamm (I); Marika Tuus-Laul (K)
- Created from: District no. 9; District no. 10

Electoral district no. 9 (Estonian: Valimisringkond nr 9) is one of the 12 multi-member electoral districts of the Riigikogu, the national legislature of Estonia. The district was established as electoral district no. 8 in 1995 following the re-organisation of electoral districts. It was renamed electoral district no. 9 in 2003 following another re-organisation of electoral districts. It is conterminous with the counties of Jõgeva and Tartu (excluding Tartu municipality which has its own electoral district). The district currently elects seven of the 101 members of the Riigikogu using the open party-list proportional representation electoral system. At the 2019 parliamentary election it had 65,898 registered electors.

== Electoral system ==
Electoral district no. 9 currently elects seven of the 101 members of the Riigikogu using the open party-list proportional representation electoral system. The allocation of seats is carried out in three stages. In the first stage, any individual candidate, regardless of whether they are a party or independent candidate, who receives more votes than the district's simple quota (Hare quota: valid votes in district/number of seats allocated to district) is elected via a personal mandate. In the second stage, district mandates are allocated to parties by dividing their district votes by the district's simple quota. Only parties that reach the 5% national threshold compete for district mandates and any personal mandates won by the party are subtracted from the party's district mandates. Prior to 2003 if a party's surplus/remainder votes was equal to or greater than 75% of the district's simple quota it received one additional district mandate. Any unallocated district seats are added to a national pool of compensatory seats. In the final stage, compensatory mandates are calculated based on the national vote and using a modified D'Hondt method. Only parties that reach the 5% national threshold compete for compensatory seats and any personal and district mandates won by the party are subtracted from the party's compensatory mandates. Though calculated nationally, compensatory mandates are allocated at the district level.

=== Seats ===
Seats allocated to electoral district no. 9 by the National Electoral Committee of Estonia at each election was as follows:

- 2023 - 7
- 2019 - 7
- 2015 - 8
- 2011 - 7
- 2007 - 7
- 2003 - 8
- 1999 - 8
- 1995 - 8

== Election results ==
=== Summary ===
Election	Left EÜVP/EVP/ESDTP/Õ/V			Constitution K/EÜRP/MKOE			Social Democrats SDE/RM/M			Greens EER/NJ/R			Centre K/R			Reform RE			Isamaa I/IRL/I/I\ERSP/I			Conservative People's EKRE/ERL/EME/KMÜ		
Election	Votes	%	Seats	Votes	%	Seats	Votes	%	Seats	Votes	%	Seats	Votes	%	Seats	Votes	%	Seats	Votes	%	Seats	Votes	%	Seats
2023	719	1.53%	0				4,235	9.03%	0	490	1.04%	0	4,298	9.17%	1	14,229	30.34%	2	5,609	11.96%	1	9,244	19.71%	1
2019	34	0.08%	0				3,891	9.30%	0	616	1.47%	0	6,438	15.38%	1	11,399	27.24%	2	7,308	17.46%	1	9,362	22.37%	1
2015	87	0.21%	0				7,583	18.56%	1	369	0.90%	0	7,644	18.71%	1	11,896	29.11%	2	6,099	14.93%	1	3,814	9.33%	0
2011							7,092	17.59%	1	1,188	2.95%	0	6,184	15.34%	1	11,326	28.09%	2	10,508	26.06%	2	2,950	7.32%	0
2007	38	0.09%	0	357	0.89%	0	2,979	7.43%	0	2,228	5.56%	0	8,595	21.44%	1	9,741	24.30%	1	6,288	15.68%	1	9,101	22.70%	1
2003	104	0.27%	0	324	0.85%	0	1,902	4.98%	0				6,875	18.01%	1	3,965	10.39%	1	1,882	4.93%	0	15,844	41.51%	3
1999				1,180	3.24%	0	5,262	14.44%	1				7,406	20.32%	1	4,355	11.95%	0	3,992	10.95%	0	8,514	23.36%	1
1995	695	1.66%	0	2,223	5.31%	0	1,561	3.73%	0	286	0.68%	0	3,887	9.29%	0	3,911	9.34%	0	2,470	5.90%	0	19,067	45.55%	3

(Excludes compensatory seats)

=== Detailed ===
Party has received at least 5% of the vote nationally and is entitled to compete for district seats.

==== 2023 ====
Results of the 2023 parliamentary election held on 5 March 2023:

Party		Votes per county				Total Votes	%	Seats			
Party		Jõgeva	Tartu	Expat- riates	Elec- tronic	Total Votes	%	Per.	Dis.	Com.	Tot.
Estonian Reform Party	REF	1,282	2,833	14	9,550	14,229	30.34%	0	2	1	3
Conservative People's Party of Estonia	EKRE	2,087	4,067	79	2,599	9,244	19.71%	0	1	0	1
Estonia 200	EE200	565	1,522	8	4,526	6,860	14.63%	0	1	0	1
Isamaa	IE	1,292	1,476	2	2,633	5,609	11.96%	0	1	0	1
Estonian Centre Party	KESK	1,276	1,229	3	1,619	4,298	9.17%	0	0	0	0
Social Democratic Party	SDE	365	1,287	4	2,434	4,235	9.03%	0	0	0	0
Parempoolsed		138	342	0	688	1,207	2.57%	0	0	0	0
Estonian United Left Party	EÜVP	245	296	0	150	719	1.53%	0	0	0	0
Estonian Greens	EER	42	133	1	290	490	1.04%	0	0	0	0
Valid votes		7,292	13,185	111	24,489	46,891	100.00%	0	5	1	6
Rejected votes		97	164	1	0	313	0.66%				
Total polled		7,389	13,349	112	24,489	47,204	64.75%				
Registered electors		21,866	45,918	5,116		72,900					

The following candidates were elected:

- District mandates - Kert Kingo (EKRE), 3,095 votes; Aivar Kokk (IE), 3,136 votes; Urmas Kruuse (REF), 6,235 votes; Irja Lutsar (EE200), 3,523 votes; Luisa Rõivas (REF), 2,939 votes;
- Compensatory mandates - Erkki Keldo (REF), 1,445 votes;

==== 2019 ====
Results of the 2019 parliamentary election held on 3 March 2019:

Party		Votes per county				Total Votes	%	Seats			
Party		Jõgeva	Tartu	Expat- riates	Elec- tronic	Total Votes	%	Per.	Dis.	Com.	Tot.
Estonian Reform Party	RE	1,328	3,633	14	6,424	11,399	27.24%	0	2	0	2
Conservative People's Party of Estonia	EKRE	2,248	4,113	68	2,933	9,362	22.37%	0	1	1	2
Isamaa	I	1,811	2,324	4	3,169	7,308	17.46%	0	1	1	2
Estonian Centre Party	K	2,123	2,650	8	1,657	6,438	15.38%	0	1	0	1
Social Democratic Party	SDE	780	1,163	10	1,938	3,891	9.30%	0	0	0	0
Estonia 200		241	686	2	860	1,789	4.28%	0	0	0	0
Estonian Greens	EER	75	231	3	307	616	1.47%	0	0	0	0
Estonian Free Party	EVA	129	184	1	257	571	1.36%	0	0	0	0
Estonian Biodiversity Party		45	158	0	236	439	1.05%	0	0	0	0
Estonian United Left Party	EÜVP	5	16	0	13	34	0.08%	0	0	0	0
Valid votes		8,785	15,158	110	17,794	41,847	100.00%	0	5	2	7
Rejected votes		143	227	1	0	371	0.88%				
Total polled		8,928	15,385	111	17,794	42,218	63.73%				
Registered electors		23,242	42,609	394		66,245					

The following candidates were elected:

- District mandates - Peeter Ernits (EKRE), 3,846 votes; Urmas Kruuse (RE), 5,398 votes; Valdo Randpere (RE), 2,079 votes; Raivo Tamm (I), 2,583 votes; and Marika Tuus-Laul (K), 2,095 votes.
- Compensatory mandates - Kert Kingo (EKRE), 1,082 votes; and Aivar Kokk (I), 2,536 votes.

==== 2015 ====
Results of the 2015 parliamentary election held on 1 March 2015:

Party		Votes per county				Total Votes	%	Seats			
Party		Jõgeva	Tartu	Expat- riates	Elec- tronic	Total Votes	%	Per.	Dis.	Com.	Tot.
Estonian Reform Party	RE	2,208	5,378	16	4,294	11,896	29.11%	1	1	1	3
Estonian Centre Party	K	3,106	3,784	4	750	7,644	18.71%	0	1	0	1
Social Democratic Party	SDE	2,127	3,094	13	2,349	7,583	18.56%	0	1	0	1
Pro Patria and Res Publica Union	IRL	1,960	2,039	12	2,088	6,099	14.93%	0	1	1	2
Conservative People's Party of Estonia	EKRE	1,350	1,559	7	898	3,814	9.33%	0	0	1	1
Estonian Free Party	EVA	584	1,277	4	1,224	3,089	7.56%	0	0	0	0
Estonian Greens	EER	65	142	3	159	369	0.90%	0	0	0	0
Party of People's Unity	RÜE	26	91	0	34	151	0.37%	0	0	0	0
Estonian Independence Party	EIP	52	51	1	23	127	0.31%	0	0	0	0
Estonian United Left Party	EÜVP	33	49	1	4	87	0.21%	0	0	0	0
Valid votes		11,511	17,464	61	11,823	40,859	100.00%	1	4	3	8
Rejected votes		156	165	2	0	323	0.78%				
Total polled		11,667	17,629	63	11,823	41,182	62.30%				
Registered electors		26,028	40,015	63		66,106					

The following candidates were elected:

- Personal mandates - Urmas Kruuse (RE), 5,960 votes.
- District mandates - Igor Gräzin (RE), 1,973 votes; Aivar Kokk (IRL), 1,725 votes; Tanel Talve (SDE), 2,294 votes; and Marika Tuus-Laul (K), 2,904 votes.
- Compensatory mandates - Jaak Aaviksoo (IRL), 1,405 votes; Raivo Põldaru (EKRE), 919 votes; and Terje Trei (RE), 557 votes.

==== 2011 ====
Results of the 2011 parliamentary election held on 6 March 2011:

Party		Votes per county				Total Votes	%	Seats			
Party		Jõgeva	Tartu	Expat- riates	Elec- tronic	Total Votes	%	Per.	Dis.	Com.	Tot.
Estonian Reform Party	RE	2,766	5,589	16	2,955	11,326	28.09%	1	1	0	2
Pro Patria and Res Publica Union	IRL	3,820	4,093	34	2,561	10,508	26.06%	0	2	0	2
Social Democratic Party	SDE	2,006	3,582	5	1,499	7,092	17.59%	0	1	0	1
Estonian Centre Party	K	2,605	3,071	5	503	6,184	15.34%	0	1	0	1
People's Union of Estonia	ERL	1,657	900	1	392	2,950	7.32%	0	0	0	0
Estonian Greens	EER	294	599	3	292	1,188	2.95%	0	0	0	0
Estonian Independence Party	EIP	129	143	0	58	330	0.82%	0	0	0	0
Märt Meesak (Independent)		69	182	0	43	294	0.73%	0	0	0	0
Ingvar Tšižikov (Independent)		59	135	0	44	238	0.59%	0	0	0	0
Party of Estonian Christian Democrats	EKD	35	58	0	31	124	0.31%	0	0	0	0
Russian Party in Estonia	VEE	22	49	2	10	83	0.21%	0	0	0	0
Valid votes		13,462	18,401	66	8,388	40,317	100.00%	1	5	0	6
Rejected votes		182	292	2	0	476	1.17%				
Total polled		13,644	18,693	68	8,388	40,793	60.43%				
Registered electors		27,834	39,602	68		67,504					

The following candidates were elected:

- Personal mandates - Igor Gräzin (RE), 6,109 votes.
- District mandates - Ene Ergma (IRL), 3,873 votes; Aivar Kokk (IRL), 3,382 votes; Jaan Õunapuu (SDE), 3,103 votes; Mati Raidma (RE), 1,699 votes; and Marika Tuus (K), 2,976 votes.

==== 2007 ====
Results of the 2007 parliamentary election held on 4 March 2007:

Party		Votes per county				Total Votes	%	Seats			
Party		Jõgeva	Tartu	Expat- riates	Elec- tronic	Total Votes	%	Per.	Dis.	Com.	Tot.
Estonian Reform Party	RE	3,139	6,103	2	497	9,741	24.30%	0	1	0	1
People's Union of Estonia	ERL	5,068	3,800	2	231	9,101	22.70%	0	1	1	2
Estonian Centre Party	K	4,005	4,430	8	152	8,595	21.44%	0	1	0	1
Pro Patria and Res Publica Union	IRL	2,126	3,708	39	415	6,288	15.68%	0	1	0	1
Social Democratic Party	SDE	1,387	1,444	7	141	2,979	7.43%	0	0	0	0
Estonian Greens	EER	690	1,378	4	156	2,228	5.56%	0	0	0	0
Party of Estonian Christian Democrats	EKD	130	315	0	11	456	1.14%	0	0	0	0
Constitution Party	K	134	223	0	0	357	0.89%	0	0	0	0
Tõnu Hallik (Independent)		27	142	0	5	174	0.43%	0	0	0	0
Estonian Independence Party	EIP	27	38	0	4	69	0.17%	0	0	0	0
Estonian Left Party	EVP	11	26	1	0	38	0.09%	0	0	0	0
Kalev Kodu (Independent)		11	24	0	0	35	0.09%	0	0	0	0
Russian Party in Estonia	VEE	10	21	1	0	32	0.08%	0	0	0	0
Valid votes		16,765	21,652	64	1,612	40,093	100.00%	0	4	1	5
Rejected votes		236	301	0	0	537	1.32%				
Total polled		17,001	21,953	64	1,612	40,630	61.84%				
Registered electors		28,284	37,355	64		65,703					

The following candidates were elected:

- District mandates - Ene Ergma (IRL), 3,979 votes; Igor Gräzin (RE), 3,001 votes; Villu Reiljan (ERL), 2,855 votes; and Marika Tuus (K), 3,758 votes.
- Compensatory mandates - Mai Treial (ERL), 922 votes.

==== 2003 ====
Results of the 2003 parliamentary election held on 2 March 2003:

Party		Votes per county			Total Votes	%	Seats			
Party		Jõgeva	Tartu	Expat- riates	Total Votes	%	Per.	Dis.	Com.	Tot.
People's Union of Estonia	ERL	8,229	7,615	0	15,844	41.51%	1	2	1	4
Union for the Republic–Res Publica	ÜVE-RP	2,528	4,391	24	6,943	18.19%	0	1	0	1
Estonian Centre Party	K	3,133	3,737	5	6,875	18.01%	0	1	1	2
Estonian Reform Party	RE	1,317	2,641	7	3,965	10.39%	0	1	0	1
Moderate People's Party	RM	867	1,026	9	1,902	4.98%	0	0	0	0
Pro Patria Union Party	I	897	954	31	1,882	4.93%	0	0	0	0
Estonian United People's Party	EÜRP	95	228	1	324	0.85%	0	0	0	0
Estonian Christian People's Party	EKRP	52	107	0	159	0.42%	0	0	0	0
Estonian Independence Party	EIP	52	61	0	113	0.30%	0	0	0	0
Estonian Social Democratic Labour Party	ESDTP	25	79	0	104	0.27%	0	0	0	0
Russian Party in Estonia	VEE	22	31	1	54	0.14%	0	0	0	0
Valid votes		17,217	20,870	78	38,165	100.00%	1	5	2	8
Rejected votes		277	282	9	568	1.47%				
Total polled		17,494	21,152	87	38,733	59.40%				
Registered electors		28,902	36,217	87	65,206					
Turnout		60.53%	58.40%	100.00%	59.40%					

The following candidates were elected:

- Personal mandates - Villu Reiljan (ERL), 5,329 votes.
- District mandates - Margi Ein (ERL), 1,881 votes; Tarmo Leinatamm (ÜVE-RP), 3,670 votes; Jaan Õunapuu (ERL), 4,208 votes; Toomas Tein (RE), 1,867 votes; and Marika Tuus (K), 4,028 votes.
- Compensatory mandates - Mailis Rand (K), 925 votes; and Mai Treial (ERL), 1,704 votes.

==== 1999 ====
Results of the 1999 parliamentary election held on 7 March 1999:

Party		Votes per county			Total Votes	%	Seats			
Party		Jõgeva	Tartu	Expat- riates	Total Votes	%	Per.	Dis.	Com.	Tot.
Estonian Country People's Party	EME	5,239	3,273	2	8,514	23.36%	1	0	1	2
Estonian Centre Party	K	2,797	4,606	3	7,406	20.32%	0	1	0	1
Moderate	M	2,323	2,925	14	5,262	14.44%	0	1	1	2
Estonian Reform Party	RE	1,640	2,712	3	4,355	11.95%	0	0	1	1
Pro Patria Union	I	1,214	2,709	69	3,992	10.95%	0	0	2	2
Estonian Coalition Party	KE	2,104	1,765	0	3,869	10.61%	0	0	1	1
Estonian United People's Party	EÜRP	550	630	0	1,180	3.24%	0	0	0	0
Estonian Christian People's Party	EKRP	245	397	0	642	1.76%	0	0	0	0
Estonian Blue Party	ESE	151	218	1	370	1.02%	0	0	0	0
Russian Party in Estonia	VEE	116	205	1	322	0.88%	0	0	0	0
Farmers' Assembly		122	178	2	302	0.83%	0	0	0	0
Progress Party		209	27	0	236	0.65%	0	0	0	0
Valid votes		16,710	19,645	95	36,450	100.00%	1	2	6	9
Rejected votes		305	457	3	765	2.06%				
Total polled		17,015	20,102	98	37,215	56.47%				
Registered electors		29,858	35,942	98	65,898					
Turnout		56.99%	55.93%	100.00%	56.47%					

The following candidates were elected:

- Personal mandates - Villu Reiljan (EME), 5,252 votes.
- District mandates - Erika Salumäe (K), 2,577 votes; and Enn Tarto (M), 1,738 votes.
- Compensatory mandates - Liia Hänni (M), 804 votes; Kalle Jürgenson (I), 1,633 votes; Kaljo Kiisk (RE), 2,051 votes; Peeter Olesk (I), 1,489 votes; Jaan Pöör (EME), 376 votes; and Mai Treial (KE), 1,593 votes.

==== 1995 ====
Results of the 1995 parliamentary election held on 5 March 1995:

Party		Votes per county			Total Votes	%	Seats			
Party		Jõgeva	Tartu	Expat- riates	Total Votes	%	Per.	Dis.	Com.	Tot.
Coalition Party and Rural People's Association	KMÜ	11,399	7,650	18	19,067	45.55%	1	2	2	5
Estonian Reform Party	RE	1,618	2,274	19	3,911	9.34%	0	0	1	1
Estonian Centre Party	K	1,770	2,109	8	3,887	9.29%	0	0	0	0
The Right Wingers	P	949	2,351	24	3,324	7.94%	0	0	1	1
Pro Patria and ERSP Union	I\ERSP	823	1,524	123	2,470	5.90%	0	0	0	0
Our Home is Estonia	MKOE	990	1,224	9	2,223	5.31%	0	0	1	1
Estonian Future Party	TEE	506	1,246	2	1,754	4.19%	0	0	0	0
Moderate	M	344	1,202	15	1,561	3.73%	0	0	1	1
Estonian Farmers' Party	ETRE	471	615	2	1,088	2.60%	0	0	0	0
Better Estonia/Estonian Citizen	PE/EK	189	588	4	781	1.87%	0	0	0	0
Justice	Õ	263	432	0	695	1.66%	0	0	0	0
Forest Party		185	219	1	405	0.97%	0	0	0	0
Fourth Force	NJ	90	196	0	286	0.68%	0	0	0	0
Estonian National Federation	ERKL	81	119	1	201	0.48%	0	0	0	0
Blue Party	SE	91	76	2	169	0.40%	0	0	0	0
Eino Korjus (Independent)		6	34	0	40	0.10%	0	0	0	0
Valid votes		19,775	21,859	228	41,862	100.00%	1	2	6	9
Rejected votes		272	351	0	623	1.47%				
Total polled		20,047	22,210	228	42,485	66.70%				
Registered electors		28,896	34,576	228	63,700					
Turnout		69.38%	64.24%	100.00%	66.70%					

The following candidates were elected:

- Personal mandates - Villu Reiljan (KMÜ), 6,800 votes.
- District mandates - Aavo Mölder (KMÜ), 2,557 votes; and Juhan Telgmaa (KMÜ), 3,783 votes.
- Compensatory mandates - Ignar Fjuk (RE), 2,618 votes; Liia Hänni (M), 662 votes; Nikolai Maspanov (MKOE), 1,236 votes; Ülo Nugis (P), 2,940 votes; Jaan Pöör (KMÜ), 1,022 votes; and Mai Treial (KMÜ), 1,021 votes.
