= Riigikogu electoral district no. 8 =

Electoral district of Estonia

Electoral district no. 8
- Valimisringkond nr 8
- Electoral District for the Riigikogu
- Location of Electoral district no. 8 within Estonia
- County: Järva; Viljandi
- Population: 76,335 (2020)
- Electorate: 61,657 (2019)

Current Electoral District
- Created: 1995
- Seats: List: 7 (2015–present); 8 (2007–2015); 9 (1999–2007); 10 (1995–1999)
- Member of the Riigikogu: List: Yoko Alender (RE); Kalle Grünthal (EKRE); Helmen Kütt (SDE); Jürgen Ligi (RE); Lauri Läänemets (SDE); Peeter Rahnel (K); Kersti Sarapuu (K); Helir-Valdor Seeder (I)
- Created from: District no. 8; District no. 9

Electoral district no. 8 (Estonian: Valimisringkond nr 8) is one of the 12 multi-member electoral districts of the Riigikogu, the national legislature of Estonia. The district was established as electoral district no. 7 in 1995 following the re-organisation of electoral districts. It was renamed electoral district no. 8 in 2003 following another re-organisation of electoral districts. It is conterminous with the counties of Järva and Viljandi. The district currently elects seven of the 101 members of the Riigikogu using the open party-list proportional representation electoral system. At the 2019 parliamentary election it had 61,657 registered electors.

== Electoral system ==
Electoral district no. 8 currently elects seven of the 101 members of the Riigikogu using the open party-list proportional representation electoral system. The allocation of seats is carried out in three stages. In the first stage, any individual candidate, regardless of whether they are a party or independent candidate, who receives more votes than the district's simple quota (Hare quota: valid votes in district/number of seats allocated to district) is elected via a personal mandate. In the second stage, district mandates are allocated to parties by dividing their district votes by the district's simple quota. Only parties that reach the 5% national threshold compete for district mandates and any personal mandates won by the party are subtracted from the party's district mandates. Prior to 2003 if a party's surplus/remainder votes was equal to or greater than 75% of the district's simple quota it received one additional district mandate. Any unallocated district seats are added to a national pool of compensatory seats. In the final stage, compensatory mandates are calculated based on the national vote and using a modified D'Hondt method. Only parties that reach the 5% national threshold compete for compensatory seats and any personal and district mandates won by the party are subtracted from the party's compensatory mandates. Though calculated nationally, compensatory mandates are allocated at the district level.

=== Seats ===
Seats allocated to electoral district no. 8 by the National Electoral Committee of Estonia at each election was as follows:

- 2023 - 7
- 2019 - 7
- 2015 - 7
- 2011 - 8
- 2007 - 8
- 2003 - 9
- 1999 - 9
- 1995 - 10

== Election results ==
=== Summary ===
Election	Left EÜVP/EVP/ESDTP/Õ/V			Constitution K/EÜRP/MKOE			Social Democrats SDE/RM/M			Greens EER/NJ/R			Centre K/R			Reform RE			Isamaa I/IRL/I/I\ERSP/I			Conservative People's EKRE/ERL/EME/KMÜ		
Election	Votes	%	Seats	Votes	%	Seats	Votes	%	Seats	Votes	%	Seats	Votes	%	Seats	Votes	%	Seats	Votes	%	Seats	Votes	%	Seats
2023							5,084	12.94%	1	308	0.78%	0	4,021	10.23%	0	9,777	26.11%	2	4,673	11.89%	1	9,153	23.29%	1
2019	13	0.03%					4,682	12.50%	1	377	1.01%	0	6,253	16.70%	1	9,777	26.11%	2	6,176	16.49%	1	8,389	22.40%	1
2015	17	0.04%					8,898	23.04%	1	183	0.47%	0	6,127	15.86%	1	10,703	27.71%	2	6,824	17.67%	1	3,054	7.91%	0
2011							11,219	27.37%	2	772	1.88%	0	5,480	13.37%	1	11,094	27.06%	2	9,413	22.96%	2	819	2.00%	0
2007	75	0.18%		29	0.07%	0	6,114	14.49%	1	2,911	6.90%	0	9,078	21.51%	1	11,100	26.30%	2	7,758	18.38%	1	4,472	10.60%	1
2003	170	0.42%		121	0.30%	0	2,265	5.63%	0				10,973	27.28%	2	5,182	12.88%	1	4,424	11.00%	1	6,769	16.83%	1
1999				160	0.38%	0	7,755	18.45%	1				10,485	24.95%	2	4,259	10.13%	0	8,151	19.39%	1	2,784	6.62%	0
1995	409	0.82%		239	0.48%	0	1,559	3.12%	0	316	0.63%	0	7,400	14.80%	1	5,500	11.00%	1	3,975	7.95%	0	23,842	47.67%	4

(Excludes compensatory seats)

=== Detailed ===
Party has received at least 5% of the vote nationally and is entitled to compete for district seats.

==== 2023 ====
Results of the 2023 parliamentary election held on 5 March 2023:

Party		Votes per county				Total Votes	%	Seats			
Party		Järva	Vil- jandi	Expat- riates	Elec- tronic	Total Votes	%	Per.	Dis.	Com.	Tot.
Estonian Reform Party	REF	1,570	2,101	21	7,091	10,933	27.82%	1	1	0	2
Conservative People's Party of Estonia	EKRE	2,492	3,787	83	2,608	9,153	23.29%	0	1	0	1
Social Democratic Party	SDE	827	1,493	7	2,672	5,084	12.94%	0	1	1	2
Isamaa	IE	838	1,505	5	2,200	4,673	11.89%	0	1	0	1
Estonia 200	EE200	530	1,050	10	2,542	4,195	10.68%	0	0	0	0
Estonian Centre Party	KESK	1,008	1,432	0	1,500	4,021	10.23%	0	0	1	1
Parempoolsed		143	209	0	438	806	2.05%	0	0	0	0
Estonian Greens	EER	48	57	4	191	308	0.78%	0	0	0	0
Andres Laiapea (Independent)		26	40	0	56	124	0.32%	0	0	0	0
Valid votes		7,482	11,674	130	19,298	39,297	100.00%	1	4	2	7
Rejected votes		106	132	2	0	247	0.68%				
Total polled		7,588	11,806	132	19,298	39,544	61.61%				
Registered electors		23,012	35,513	5,661		64,186					

The following candidates were elected:

- Personal mandates - Jürgen Ligi (REF), 5,797 votes.
- District mandates - Helmen Kütt (SDE), 2,098 votes; Jaak Madison (EKRE), 5,222 votes; Pipi-Liis Siemann (REF), 2,498 votes; and Helir-Valdor Seeder (IE), 2,689 votes.
- Compensatory mandates - Lauri Läänemets (SDE), 1,731 votes; and Jaak Aab (KESK), 1,562 votes.

==== 2019 ====
Results of the 2019 parliamentary election held on 3 March 2019:

Party		Votes per county				Total Votes	%	Seats			
Party		Järva	Vil- jandi	Expat- riates	Elec- tronic	Total Votes	%	Per.	Dis.	Com.	Tot.
Estonian Reform Party	RE	1,719	2,758	22	5,278	9,777	26.11%	1	1	0	2
Conservative People's Party of Estonia	EKRE	2,341	3,241	75	2,732	8,389	22.40%	1	0	0	1
Estonian Centre Party	K	1,871	2,829	4	1,549	6,253	16.70%	0	1	1	2
Isamaa	I	1,137	2,207	20	2,812	6,176	16.49%	0	1	0	1
Social Democratic Party	SDE	980	1,648	12	2,042	4,682	12.50%	0	1	0	1
Estonia 200		140	356	3	561	1,060	2.83%	0	0	0	0
Estonian Greens	EER	79	111	3	184	377	1.01%	0	0	0	0
Estonian Biodiversity Party		45	123	3	179	350	0.93%	0	0	0	0
Estonian Free Party	EVA	71	90	1	119	281	0.75%	0	0	0	0
Jüri Malsub (Independent)		27	25	0	38	90	0.24%	0	0	0	0
Estonian United Left Party	EÜVP	2	4	1	6	13	0.03%	0	0	0	0
Valid votes		8,412	13,392	144	15,500	37,448	100.00%	2	4	1	7
Rejected votes		114	141	1	0	256	0.68%				
Total polled		8,526	13,533	145	15,500	37,704	61.15%				
Registered electors		24,135	37,067	455		61,657					

The following candidates were elected:

- Personal mandates - Jürgen Ligi (RE), 6,069 votes; and Jaak Madison (EKRE), 5,612 votes.
- District mandates - Jaak Aab (K), 2,227 votes; Yoko Alender (RE), 997 votes; Helmen Kütt (SDE), 2,194 votes; and Helir-Valdor Seeder (I), 3,138 votes.
- Compensatory mandates - Kersti Sarapuu (K), 1,394 votes.

==== 2015 ====
Results of the 2015 parliamentary election held on 1 March 2015:

Party		Votes per county				Total Votes	%	Seats			
Party		Järva	Vil- jandi	Expat- riates	Elec- tronic	Total Votes	%	Per.	Dis.	Com.	Tot.
Estonian Reform Party	RE	2,533	4,221	12	3,937	10,703	27.71%	1	1	0	2
Social Democratic Party	SDE	2,236	4,098	16	2,548	8,898	23.04%	0	1	1	2
Pro Patria and Res Publica Union	IRL	1,876	2,732	14	2,202	6,824	17.67%	0	1	0	1
Estonian Centre Party	K	2,246	3,160	3	718	6,127	15.86%	0	1	2	3
Conservative People's Party of Estonia	EKRE	956	1,362	4	732	3,054	7.91%	0	0	1	1
Estonian Free Party	EVA	523	939	3	903	2,368	6.13%	0	0	0	0
Party of People's Unity	RÜE	72	71	0	62	205	0.53%	0	0	0	0
Estonian Greens	EER	50	74	0	59	183	0.47%	0	0	0	0
Heli Koit (Independent)		60	57	1	58	176	0.46%	0	0	0	0
Estonian Independence Party	EIP	24	31	1	11	67	0.17%	0	0	0	0
Estonian United Left Party	EÜVP	3	13	0	1	17	0.04%	0	0	0	0
Valid votes		10,579	16,758	54	11,231	38,622	100.00%	1	4	4	9
Rejected votes		127	186	0	0	313	0.80%				
Total polled		10,706	16,944	54	11,231	38,935	59.67%				
Registered electors		25,453	39,749	54		65,256					

The following candidates were elected:

- Personal mandates - Jürgen Ligi (RE), 6,757 votes.
- District mandates - Johannes Kert (RE), 752 votes; Helmen Kütt (SDE), 3,817 votes; Mailis Reps (K), 2,981 votes; and Helir-Valdor Seeder (IRL), 2,908 votes.
- Compensatory mandates - Jaak Madison (EKRE), 1,883 votes; Jaanus Marrandi (SDE), 1,050 votes; Kersti Sarapuu (K), 1,164 votes; and Priit Toobal (K), 1,045 votes.

==== 2011 ====
Results of the 2011 parliamentary election held on 6 March 2011:

Party		Votes per county				Total Votes	%	Seats			
Party		Järva	Vil- jandi	Expat- riates	Elec- tronic	Total Votes	%	Per.	Dis.	Com.	Tot.
Social Democratic Party	SDE	3,687	4,870	16	2,646	11,219	27.37%	1	1	0	2
Estonian Reform Party	RE	2,900	5,167	29	2,998	11,094	27.06%	0	2	2	4
Pro Patria and Res Publica Union	IRL	2,688	4,369	36	2,320	9,413	22.96%	0	2	0	2
Estonian Centre Party	K	1,709	3,208	6	557	5,480	13.37%	0	1	1	2
Andreas Reinberg (Independent)		511	643	0	259	1,413	3.45%	0	0	0	0
People's Union of Estonia	ERL	167	534	0	118	819	2.00%	0	0	0	0
Estonian Greens	EER	217	340	9	206	772	1.88%	0	0	0	0
Valdo Paddar (Independent)		63	200	1	46	310	0.76%	0	0	0	0
Kalle Hiob (Independent)		34	125	0	28	187	0.46%	0	0	0	0
Party of Estonian Christian Democrats	EKD	33	94	0	23	150	0.37%	0	0	0	0
Estonian Independence Party	EIP	33	39	2	22	96	0.23%	0	0	0	0
Russian Party in Estonia	VEE	10	26	0	4	40	0.10%	0	0	0	0
Valid votes		12,052	19,615	99	9,227	40,993	100.00%	1	6	3	10
Rejected votes		134	192	5	0	331	0.80%				
Total polled		12,186	19,807	104	9,227	41,324	58.96%				
Registered electors		27,479	42,509	104		70,092					

The following candidates were elected:

- Personal mandates - Sven Mikser (SDE), 7,431 votes.
- District mandates - Enn Eesmaa (K), 1,535 votes; Kaia Iva (IRL), 1,064 votes; Kalle Jents (RE), 1,346 votes; Helmen Kütt (SDE), 1,693 votes; Jürgen Ligi (RE), 5,043 votes; and Helir-Valdor Seeder (IRL), 4,479 votes.
- Compensatory mandates - Peep Aru (RE), 896 votes; Tõnis Kõiv (RE), 961 votes; and Priit Toobal (K), 796 votes.

==== 2007 ====
Results of the 2007 parliamentary election held on 4 March 2007:

Party		Votes per county				Total Votes	%	Seats			
Party		Järva	Vil- jandi	Expat- riates	Elec- tronic	Total Votes	%	Per.	Dis.	Com.	Tot.
Estonian Reform Party	RE	3,859	6,650	14	577	11,100	26.30%	0	2	1	3
Estonian Centre Party	K	3,559	5,339	9	171	9,078	21.51%	0	1	2	3
Pro Patria and Res Publica Union	IRL	2,569	4,587	63	539	7,758	18.38%	0	1	1	2
Social Democratic Party	SDE	2,772	2,915	13	414	6,114	14.49%	0	1	0	1
People's Union of Estonia	ERL	1,434	2,926	5	107	4,472	10.60%	0	1	0	1
Estonian Greens	EER	916	1,787	6	202	2,911	6.90%	0	0	0	0
Party of Estonian Christian Democrats	EKD	238	312	4	16	570	1.35%	0	0	0	0
Estonian Independence Party	EIP	32	36	1	8	77	0.18%	0	0	0	0
Estonian Left Party	EVP	24	47	1	3	75	0.18%	0	0	0	0
Constitution Party	K	7	22	0	0	29	0.07%	0	0	0	0
Russian Party in Estonia	VEE	8	12	0	0	20	0.05%	0	0	0	0
Valid votes		15,418	24,633	116	2,037	42,204	100.00%	0	6	4	10
Rejected votes		169	200	9	0	378	0.89%				
Total polled		15,587	24,833	125	2,037	42,582	59.17%				
Registered electors		28,251	43,589	125		71,965					

The following candidates were elected:

- District mandates - Jaak Aab (K), 4,229 votes; Meelis Atonen (RE), 4,687 votes; Tõnis Kõiv (RE), 1,926 votes; Jaanus Marrandi (ERL), 1,108 votes; Sven Mikser (SDE), 4,280 votes; and Helir-Valdor Seeder (IRL), 4,089 votes.
- Compensatory mandates - Peep Aru (RE), 1,568 votes; Kaia Iva (IRL), 886 votes; Jaan Kundla (K), 496 votes; and Arvo Sarapuu (K), 913 votes.

==== 2003 ====
Results of the 2003 parliamentary election held on 2 March 2003:

Party		Votes per county			Total Votes	%	Seats			
Party		Järva	Vil- jandi	Expat- riates	Total Votes	%	Per.	Dis.	Com.	Tot.
Estonian Centre Party	K	4,211	6,758	4	10,973	27.28%	0	2	0	2
Union for the Republic–Res Publica	ÜVE-RP	4,806	4,783	7	9,596	23.86%	0	2	0	2
People's Union of Estonia	ERL	2,637	4,131	1	6,769	16.83%	0	1	0	1
Estonian Reform Party	RE	1,944	3,235	3	5,182	12.88%	0	1	0	1
Pro Patria Union Party	I	1,380	3,024	20	4,424	11.00%	0	1	0	1
Moderate People's Party	RM	829	1,414	22	2,265	5.63%	0	0	1	1
Estonian Christian People's Party	EKRP	192	184	0	376	0.93%	0	0	0	0
Estonian Independence Party	EIP	67	154	0	221	0.55%	0	0	0	0
Estonian Social Democratic Labour Party	ESDTP	64	106	0	170	0.42%	0	0	0	0
Estonian United People's Party	EÜRP	34	87	0	121	0.30%	0	0	0	0
Ivan Tsvetkov (Independent)		87	15	0	102	0.25%	0	0	0	0
Russian Party in Estonia	VEE	12	15	0	27	0.07%	0	0	0	0
Valid votes		16,263	23,906	57	40,226	100.00%	0	7	1	8
Rejected votes		143	289	1	433	1.06%				
Total polled		16,406	24,195	58	40,659	54.75%				
Registered electors		29,964	44,246	58	74,268					
Turnout		54.75%	54.68%	100.00%	54.75%					

The following candidates were elected:

- District mandates - Jaak Allik (ERL), 1,937 votes; Peep Aru (RE), 2,064 votes; Andres Jalak (ÜVE-RP), 1,698 votes; Arnold Kimber (K), 1,830 votes; Jaanus Marrandi (K), 3,502 votes; Jaanus Rahumägi (ÜVE-RP), 3,798 votes; and Helir-Valdor Seeder (I), 2,524 votes.
- Compensatory mandates - Toomas Hendrik Ilves (RM), 1,430 votes.

==== 1999 ====
Results of the 1999 parliamentary election held on 7 March 1999:

Party		Votes per county			Total Votes	%	Seats			
Party		Järva	Vil- jandi	Expat- riates	Total Votes	%	Per.	Dis.	Com.	Tot.
Estonian Centre Party	K	4,360	6,121	4	10,485	24.95%	0	2	1	3
Pro Patria Union	I	3,170	4,836	145	8,151	19.39%	1	0	0	1
Moderate	M	2,548	5,170	37	7,755	18.45%	0	1	0	1
Estonian Coalition Party	KE	2,725	3,334	1	6,060	14.42%	0	1	0	1
Estonian Reform Party	RE	1,981	2,276	2	4,259	10.13%	0	0	2	2
Estonian Country People's Party	EME	1,007	1,774	3	2,784	6.62%	0	0	0	0
Estonian Christian People's Party	EKRP	481	477	0	958	2.28%	0	0	0	0
Estonian Blue Party	ESE	301	447	3	751	1.79%	0	0	0	0
Helju Orr (Independent)		51	151	0	202	0.48%	0	0	0	0
Estonian United People's Party	EÜRP	28	132	0	160	0.38%	0	0	0	0
Russian Party in Estonia	VEE	78	78	0	156	0.37%	0	0	0	0
Progress Party		41	111	0	152	0.36%	0	0	0	0
Jaan Kivi (Independent)		12	83	0	95	0.23%	0	0	0	0
Farmers' Assembly		18	42	1	61	0.15%	0	0	0	0
Valid votes		16,801	25,032	196	42,029	100.00%	1	4	3	8
Rejected votes		251	350	2	603	1.41%				
Total polled		17,052	25,382	198	42,632	55.78%				
Registered electors		30,295	45,933	198	76,426					
Turnout		56.29%	55.26%	100.00%	55.78%					

The following candidates were elected:

- Personal mandates - Mart Laar (I), 5,446 votes.
- District mandates - Toomas Hendrik Ilves (M), 4,521 votes; Ants Käärma (KE), 2,179 votes; Peeter Kreitzberg (K), 2,252 votes; and Jaanus Marrandi (K), 2,373 votes.
- Compensatory mandates - Sven Mikser (K), 721 votes; Märt Rask (RE), 1,647 votes; and Andres Taimla (RE), 531 votes.

==== 1995 ====
Results of the 1995 parliamentary election held on 5 March 1995:

Party		Votes per county			Total Votes	%	Seats			
Party		Järva	Vil- jandi	Expat- riates	Total Votes	%	Per.	Dis.	Com.	Tot.
Coalition Party and Rural People's Association	KMÜ	8,873	14,943	26	23,842	47.67%	1	3	0	4
Estonian Centre Party	K	3,834	3,555	11	7,400	14.80%	0	1	0	1
Estonian Reform Party	RE	2,499	2,982	19	5,500	11.00%	0	1	1	2
Pro Patria and ERSP Union	I\ERSP	1,240	2,463	272	3,975	7.95%	0	0	1	1
Better Estonia/Estonian Citizen	PE/EK	1,152	2,191	17	3,360	6.72%	0	0	0	0
Moderate	M	450	1,102	7	1,559	3.12%	0	0	0	0
The Right Wingers	P	394	648	24	1,066	2.13%	0	0	1	1
Estonian Farmers' Party	ETRE	221	502	3	726	1.45%	0	0	0	0
Estonian Future Party	TEE	212	402	1	615	1.23%	0	0	0	0
Justice	Õ	184	224	1	409	0.82%	0	0	0	0
Forest Party		160	190	2	352	0.70%	0	0	0	0
Fourth Force	NJ	98	217	1	316	0.63%	0	0	0	0
Our Home is Estonia	MKOE	107	132	0	239	0.48%	0	0	0	0
Arnold Kuusik (Independent)		25	213	0	238	0.48%	0	0	0	0
Estonian National Federation	ERKL	98	116	0	214	0.43%	0	0	0	0
Blue Party	SE	73	115	0	188	0.38%	0	0	0	0
Estonian Democratic Union	EDL	4	7	0	11	0.02%	0	0	0	0
Valid votes		19,624	30,002	384	50,010	100.00%	1	5	3	9
Rejected votes		200	330	0	530	1.05%				
Total polled		19,824	30,332	384	50,540	67.52%				
Registered electors		29,057	45,413	384	74,854					
Turnout		68.22%	66.79%	100.00%	67.52%					

The following candidates were elected:

- Personal mandates - Ants Käärma (KMÜ), 5,818 votes.
- District mandates - Jaak Allik (KMÜ), 4,476 votes; Valve Kirsipuu (RE), 4,035 votes; Tiit Made (K), 3,674 votes; Ilmar Mändmets (KMÜ), 2,506 votes; and Raoul Üksvärav (KMÜ), 4,582 votes.
- Compensatory mandates - Vootele Hansen (P), 789 votes; Mart Laar (I\ERSP), 2,093 votes; and Andres Taimla (RE), 473 votes.
