= Olev =

Olev may refer to:

- EML Olev (M415), Estonian minelayer
- Office of Low Emission Vehicles (OLEV), part of the UK government Department for Transport
- Online Electric Vehicle (OLEV)

== People ==
=== Given name ===
- Olev Eskola (1914–1990), Estonian actor
- Olev Olesk (1921–2017), Estonian politician
- Olev Raju (born 1948), Estonian economist and politician
- Olev Roomet (1901–1987), Estonian musician
- Olev Siinmaa (1881–1948), Estonian architect
- Olev Subbi (1930–2013), Estonian artist
- Olev Tinn (1920–1971), Estonian actor
- Olev Toomet (1929–2009), Estonian politician
- Olev Vinn (born 1971), Estonian paleobiologist and paleontologist

=== Surname ===
- Naum Olev (1939–2009), Russian lyricist
