= Andres Mandre =

Estonian economist and politician

Andres Mandre (born 20 March 1944 in Paide) is an Estonian economist and politician. He was a member of VIII Riigikogu.
