= Valve (disambiguation) =

A valve is a device that regulates the flow of fluids.

Valve may also refer to:

== Mechanical and electrical ==
- Brass instrument valve, for valves used in brass instruments
- Rotary valve, a valve using an internal rotor to select flow paths
- Piston valve, a valve using a piston to control fluid flow
- Piston valve (steam engine), a piston valve as used in steam engines
- Poppet valve, a valve consisting of a hole and a tapered plug on the end of a shaft, typically used in instruments, engines, etc.
- Vacuum tube, also called "thermionic valve", an electronic component
- Mercury-arc valve, a type of electrical rectifier tube

== Biology ==
- Heart valve, valves in the heart that maintain the unidirectional flow of blood
- Vein valve, valves in veins and other fluid cords in body
- Lymphatic valve, valves in lymphatic vessels
- Valve (mollusc), the shell of a mollusc
- Valve (diatoms), the siliceous unit that makes up one half of a diatom cell
- Valve (botany), part produced by the splitting of a capsule or pod when ripe
- Valve, a paired clasping process on the genitalia of male moths

== Companies ==
- Valve Corporation (also known as Valve Software or Valve), a video game developer and digital distribution company
- Valve Records, an Australian record label
- Valve Amplification Company, a U.S. high end audio electronics company

== People ==
- Alli Paasikivi, née Valve (1879–1960), First Lady of Finland
- Valve (given name), an Estonian feminine given name
- Väinö Valve (1895–1995), Finnish general

== Other uses ==
- Valve hall, a building which contains the valves of the static inverters of a high-voltage direct current plant
- The Valves, UK band

== See also ==
- Valve amplifier (tube amplifier)
  - Valve audio amplifier
  - Valve RF amplifier
- Valve gear
- Valve train
- Valveless
- Valvetronic
