= Pipi-Liis Siemann =

Estonian politician (born 1975)

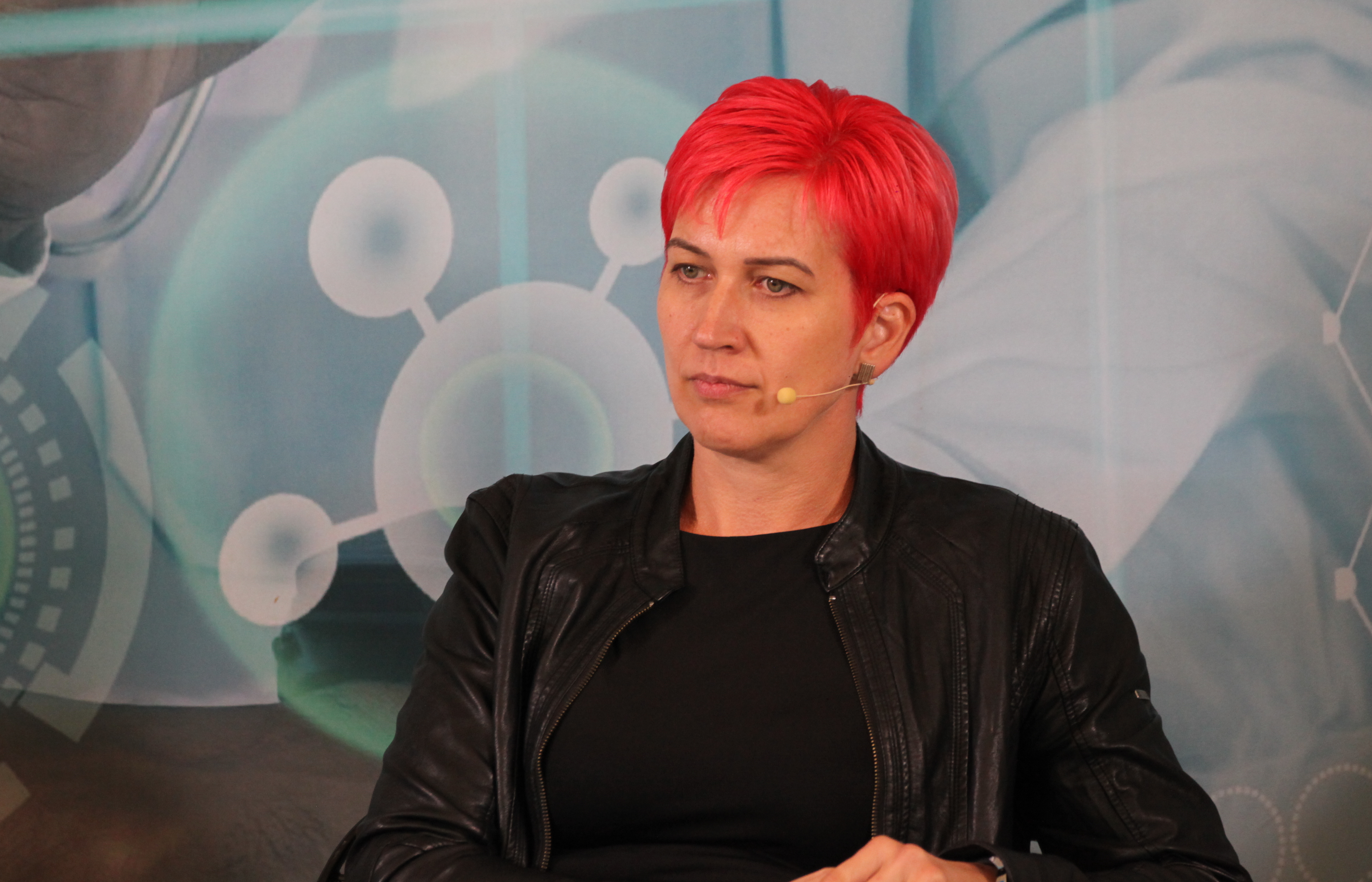
- Siemann in 2021

Member of the Riigikogu
- Incumbent
- Assumed office 10 April 2023

Personal details
- Born: 17 November 1975 (age 50) Retla, Estonia
- Party: Reform Party (since 2022)
- Other political affiliations: Isamaa (2008–2021)

Pipi-Liis Siemann (born 17 November 1975) is an Estonian politician who is a member of the XV Riigikogu. She also served as the Mayor of Türi Parish between 2012 and 2021.

== Biography ==
Pipi-Liis Siemann was born in the village of Retla in Järva County. She attended Rakvere Pedagogical School, graduating in 1995. In 2003, she graduated from Lääne-Viru College with a degree in social work. In 2007, she graduated from Tallinn University of Technology. She received an MA in educational leadership from Tallinn University in 2021. She has worked as a nursery school teacher, social worker and as a practical nurse.

Siemann previously belonged to the Isamaa political party from February 2008 until the end of 2021. In May 2022, she became a member of the Reform Party.

Siemann was elected to the Riigikogu in the parliamentary election for the Reform Party in electoral district no. 8.

== Personal life ==
SIemann is married and the mother of three children.
