= Maido (given name) =

Estonian male given name

- Gender: Male
- Language: Estonian

Origin
- Region of origin: Estonia

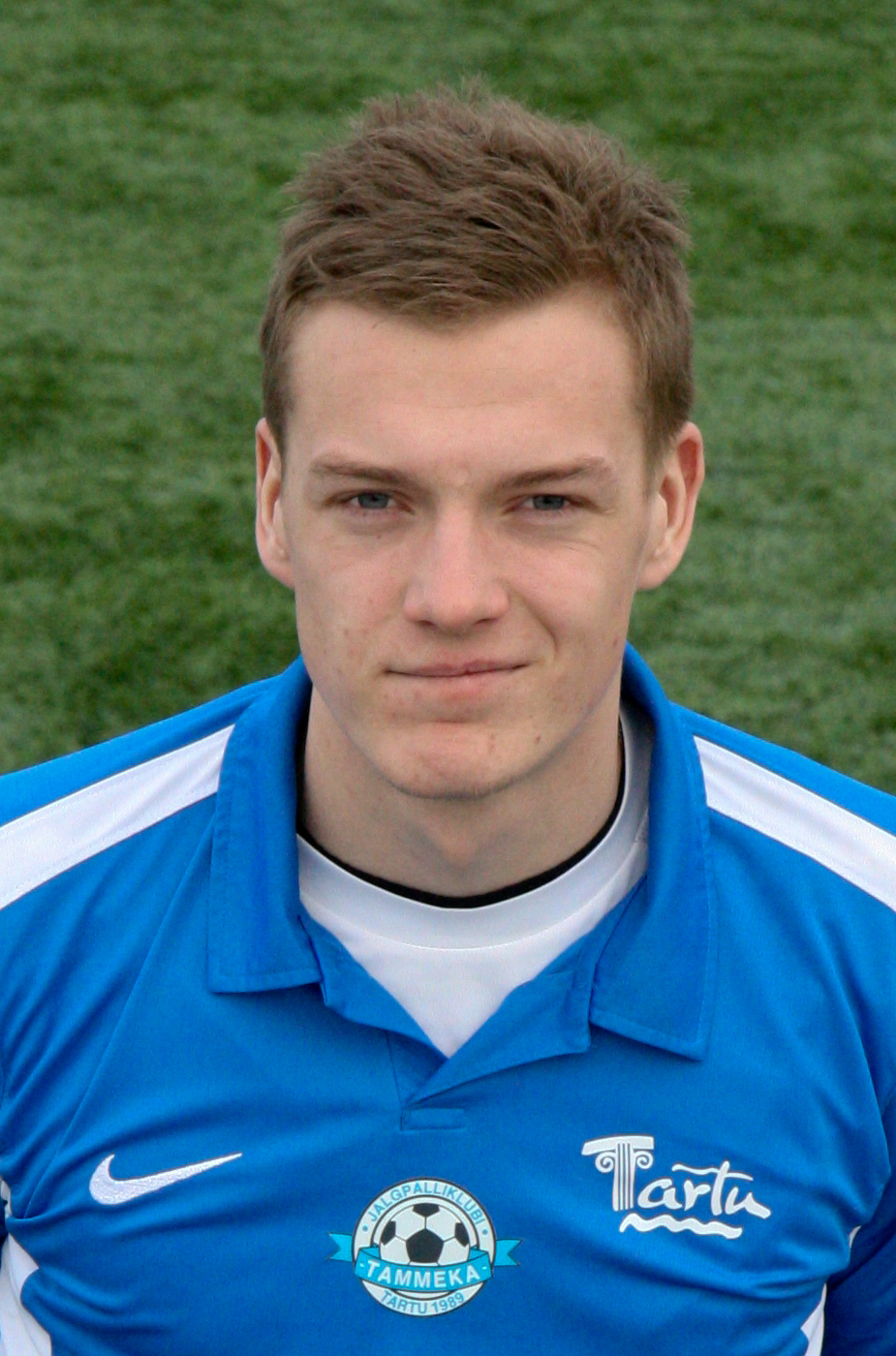
Maido Pakk

Maido is an Estonian-language male given name.

People named Maido include:

- Maido Pajo (born 1950), Estonian politician
- Maido Pakk (born 1989), Estonian footballer
- Maido Ruusmann (born 1983), Estonian politician
