= Rein Karemäe =

Estonian politician (1934–2014)

Rein Karemäe (20 August 1934 – 7 July 2014) was an Estonian journalist, television presenter, and politician. Karemäe was born in Tallinn. He was a member of VIII Riigikogu.
