= Jaanus Betlem =

Estonian politician

Jaanus Betlem (born 9 January 1961 Tallinn) is an Estonian politician. He was a member of VII and VIII Riigikogu.

He graduated from Tallinn 21st Secondary School, and in 1983 as a teacher of Estonian language and literature at the Tallinn Pedagogical Institute. In 1991, together with Maire Aunaste, he co-directed the political television series P nagu poliitika on Eesti Televisioon.
