= Endel Eero =

Estonian politician

Endel Eero (21 November 1930 in Valjala – 7 September 2006) is an Estonian politician. He was a member of the VII and VIII Riigikogu.
