= Ülo Peets =

Estonian politician (born 1944)

Ülo Peets (born 2 December 1944 in Pala Parish, Tartu County) is an Estonian politician. He was a member of VIII Riigikogu.
