= Märt Kubo =

Estonian politician

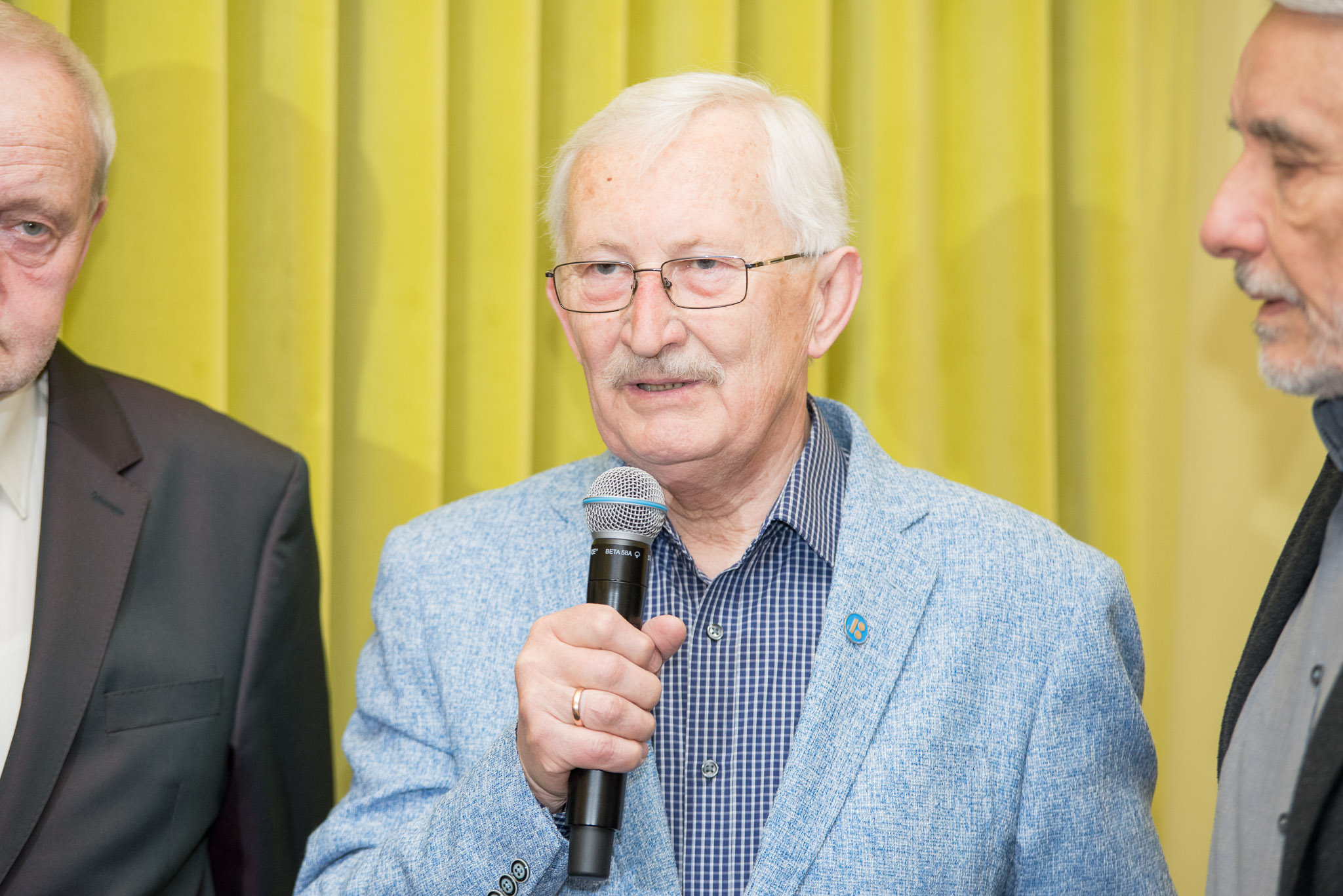
Kubo in 2018

Märt Kubo (born 11 April 1944 in Tarvastu Parish, Viljandi County) is an Estonian theatre pedagogue, critic and politician. In 1992, he was Minister of Culture. He was a member of VIII Riigikogu.

Kubo studied clarinet at the Viljandi Music School, graduating in 1960, and then graduated from Viljandi Secondary School No. 2 in 1962. In 1970, he graduated from Tartu State University with a degree in history and was a postgraduate student and lecturer at the university between 1970 and 1980. He was the director of the Noorsoo Theatre between 1990 and 1992. In 1992 he was the Minister of Culture of the Transitional Government. From 1993 until 1995, he was the editor of Teater. Muusika. Kino magazine. From 2000 until 2001, he was the chairman of the Estonian Coalition Party and compiled the book Eesti Koonderakond 1991–2001 in 2001.

Kubo has published articles on theatre and film, compiled the books Rahvusooper Estonia 1998–2003 in 2003 and Rahvusooper Estonia 2003–2008 in 2008, which detailed the history of the Estonian National Opera. Kubo is the chairman of the administrative board of the National Opera Foundation operating at the Estonian National Culture Foundation.
