= Olev Raju =

Estonian politician (1948–2026)

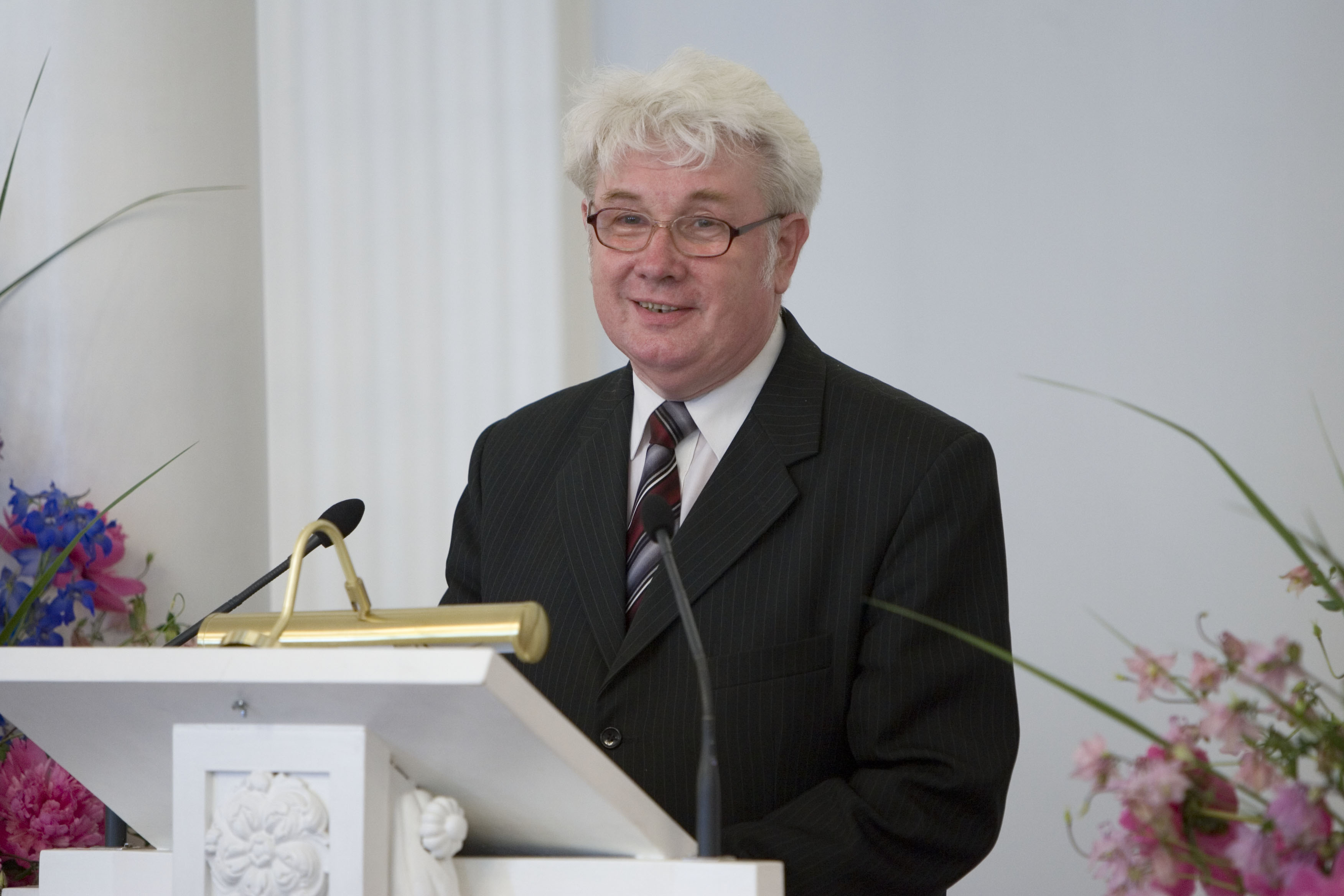
Raju in 2006

Olev Raju (14 January 1948 – 9 July 2026) was an Estonian economist and politician.

== Life and career ==
Raju was born in Tartu on 14 January 1948. He was a member of the VIII Riigikogu and IX Riigikogu.

He was a member of Estonian Centre Party. In August 2022, he was elected as the member of Estonian Centre Party's audit committee.

Raju died on 9 July 2026, at the age of 78.
