= Rein Kask =

Estonian politician (born 1947)

Rein Kask (born 12 February 1947 in Pärnu) is an Estonian politician. He was a member of VIII Riigikogu.
