= Maido Pajo =

Estonian politician and lawyer

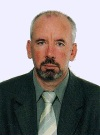
Maido Pajo

Maido Pajo (born 24 October 1950) is an Estonian politician and lawyer. He was a member of VIII Riigikogu.

Pajo was born in Kallaste Raion. In 1977, he graduated from Tartu State University's Faculty of Law. He has worked as the head of the legal department of the Ministry of Rural Affairs from 1986 until 1992, and as its deputy minister from 1990 until 1992. From 1989 until 1992, and from 1999 until 2002, he was the president of the Estonian Bar Association.
