= Kalle Jents =

Estonian politician

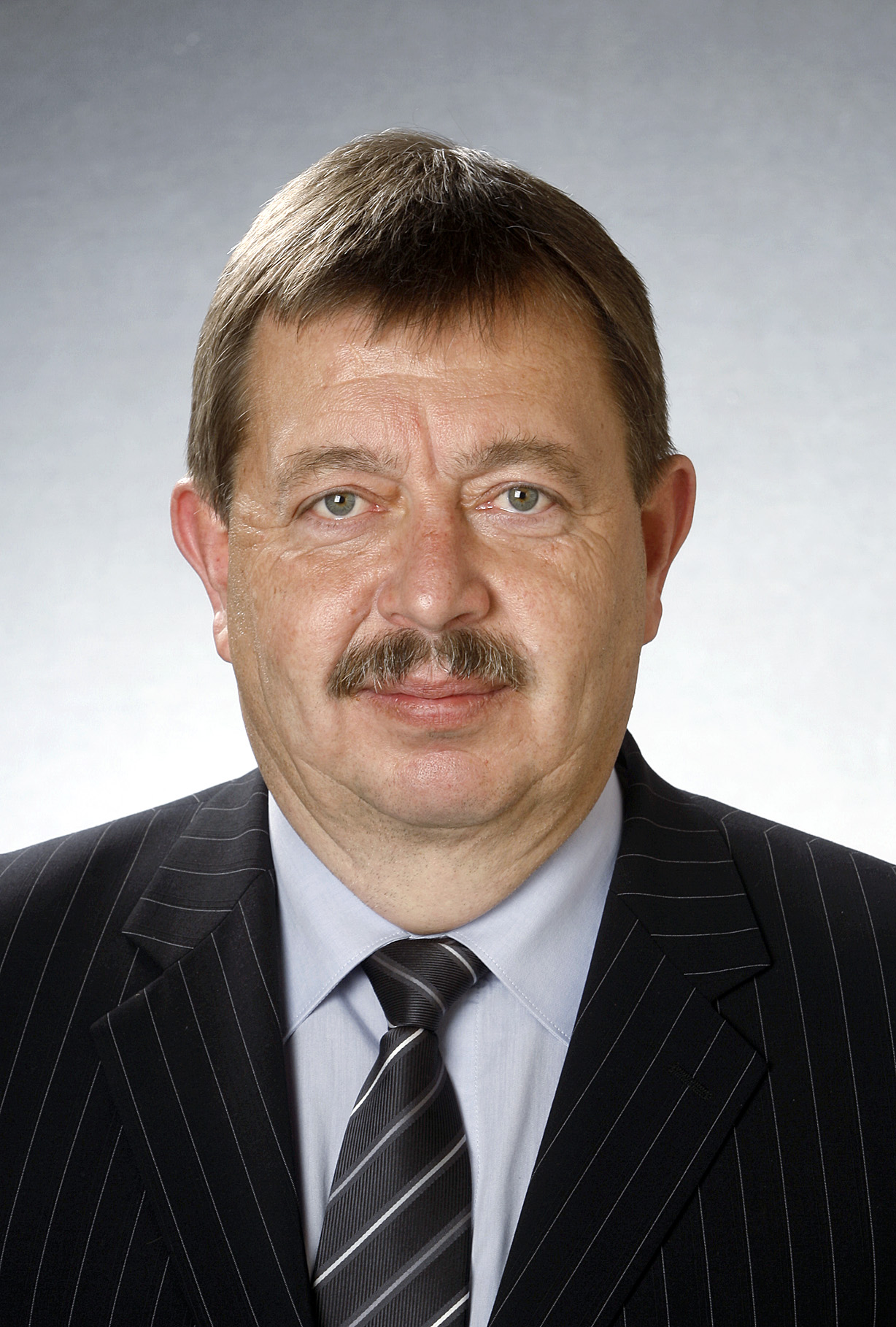
Kalle Jents in 2011

Kalle Jents (born 22 June 1957 in Karksi-Nuia) is an Estonian politician who represented the Estonian Reform Party in the Riigikogu from 2011 to 2015.

He graduated from the Nuia Secondary School in 1975 (also known as August Kitzberg Gymnasium) and from the law faculty of the University of Tartu in 1980. In 1989, he worked with the Communist Party of Estonia as the ideological secretary of the Viljandi District Commission.

From 1992 to 2007, he was the chairman of AS Hetika. He has been a member of the Estonian Reform Party since 3 August 2004. He is also a part of the Reform Party Council.

He was a member of Viljandi City Council from 1989 to 1992, and again from 2005 to 2007. From 2007 to 2011, he was the mayor of Viljandi.

He became the mayor after the transfer of former mayor Peep Aru to the Riigikogu.

He was a member of the Committee on Legal Affairs in the Riigikogu, as well as the committees on foreign relations with Ireland, the Republic of Macedonia, and Thailand. He was also a member of the Multilingual Support Committee, the Sports and Fitness Aid Support Committee and the Järva and Viljandi County Committee.

== Personal life ==
Jents is married and the father of two daughters.
