= Igor Sedašev =

Estonian politician (born 1950)

Igor Sedašev (born 21 July 1950 in Tallinn) is an Estonian politician. He was a member of VIII Riigikogu.
