= Elmar Truu =

Estonian politician (born 1942)

Elmar Truu (also Elmar-Johannes Truu; born 19 August 1942 in Vastseliina Parish, Võru County) is an Estonian politician and sports pedagogue. He was a member of VIII Riigikogu. In 2014, Truu succeeded Rein Randver as Minister of the Environment.
