= Ando Leps =

Estonian politician (1935–2023)

Ando Leps (6 November 1935 – 4 November 2023) was an Estonian politician. He was a member of the VIII Riigikogu and IX Riigikogu.
