= Raivo Kallas =

Estonian politician (born 1957)

Raivo Kallas (born 2 December 1957) is an Estonian politician. Born in Kingissepa, he was a member of VIII Riigikogu.
