= Aino Runge =

Estonian politician

Aino Runge (17 June 1926 in Tallinn – 3 August 2014) was an Estonian financial specialist, consumer defender and politician. She was a member of VIII Riigikogu.

Her daughters are painter and designer Sirje Runge and art historian Marika Valk. She was interred at Rahumäe Cemetery.
