= Valve (given name) =

Female given name

- Gender: Female
- Language: Estonian
- Name day: 26 September

Origin
- Region of origin: Estonia

Other names
- Related names: Valvi, Velve, Vilve, Vilvi

Valve is an Estonian feminine given name.

As of 1 January 2022, 795 women in Estonia have the first name Valve, making it the 217th most popular female name in the country. The name is most commonly found in Jõgeva County, where 18.27 per 10,000 inhabitants of the county. bear the name. Individuals bearing the name Valve include:

- Valve Kirsipuu (1933–2017), Estonian economist and politician
- Valve Pormeister (1922–2002), Estonian landscape architect and architect
- Valve Raudnask (born 1936), Estonian journalist and politician
