= Vahur Glaase =

Estonian politician (born 1960)

Vahur Glaase (born 21 September 1960 Tallinn) is an Estonian politician. He was a member of VIII Riigikogu.
