= Harald Mägi =

Estonian politician

Harald Mägi (10 February 1932 in Haljala Parish, Virumaa – 17 January 2012) was an Estonian politician. He was a member of VIII Riigikogu.
