= Villu Müüripeal =

Estonian agronomist and politician

Villu Müüripeal (17 June 1937 – 9 December 2005) was an Estonian agronomist and politician. Müüripeal was born in Varbla and was a practitioner of the Taara faith. He was a member of VIII Riigikogu.
