= Marika Tuus-Laul =

Estonian politician (born 1951)

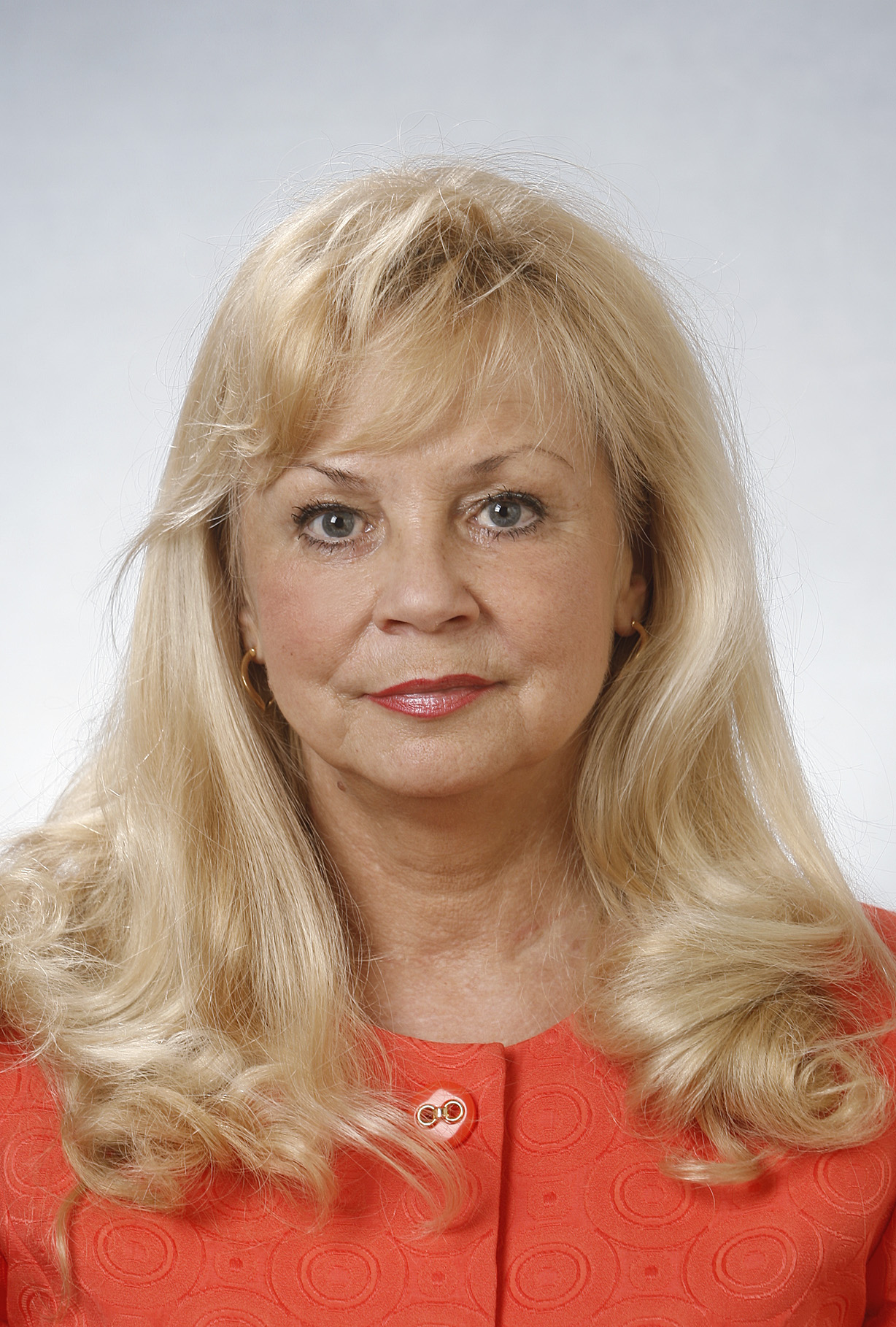
Marika Tuus-Laul

Marika Tuus-Laul (born 12 May 1951, in Tallinn) is an Estonian politician. She was a member of the X, XI, XII and XIII Riigikogu.

In 1976, she graduated from Tallinn University with a degree in cultural education. In 1986, she graduated from University of Tartu with a degree in journalism.

From 1987 to 2002 she worked at Eesti Televisioon (ETV) as a presenter, editor, chief editor and producer.

Since 2003 she has been a member of the Estonian Centre Party.
