= Jaan Õunapuu =

Estonian politician (born 1958)

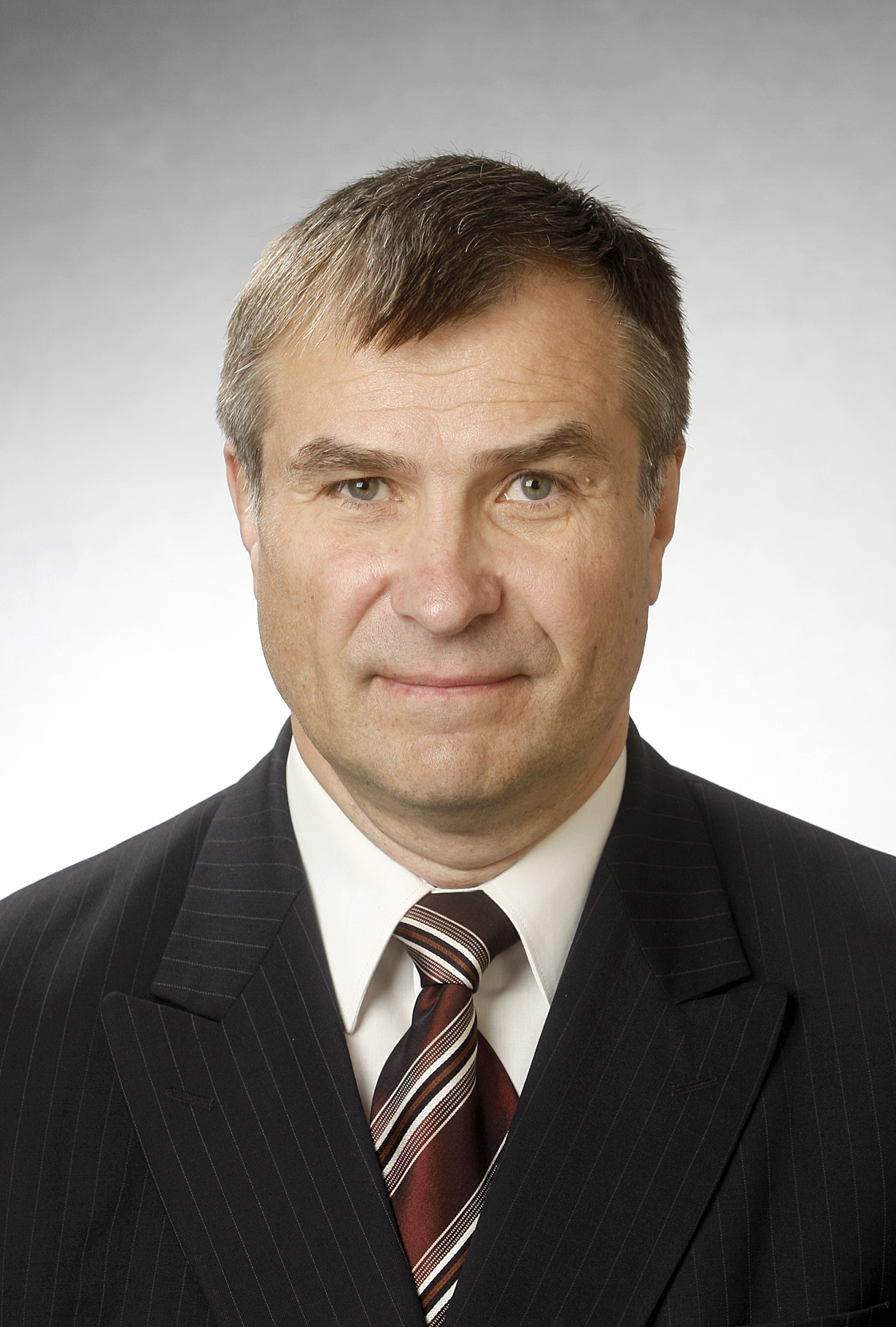
Jaan Õunapuu

Jaan Õunapuu (born 13 September 1958 in Mustjala) is an Estonian politician. From 1993 until 2003, he was the governor Tartu County. In 2003, he became the Estonian Minister of Regional Affairs; a position he held until 2007. He has been member of XI and XII Riigikogu.

From 2016 until 2017 Õunapuu was the Deputy Mayor of Tartu. He is a member of Estonian Social Democratic Party.
