= Jaanus Marrandi =

Estonian politician (born 1963)

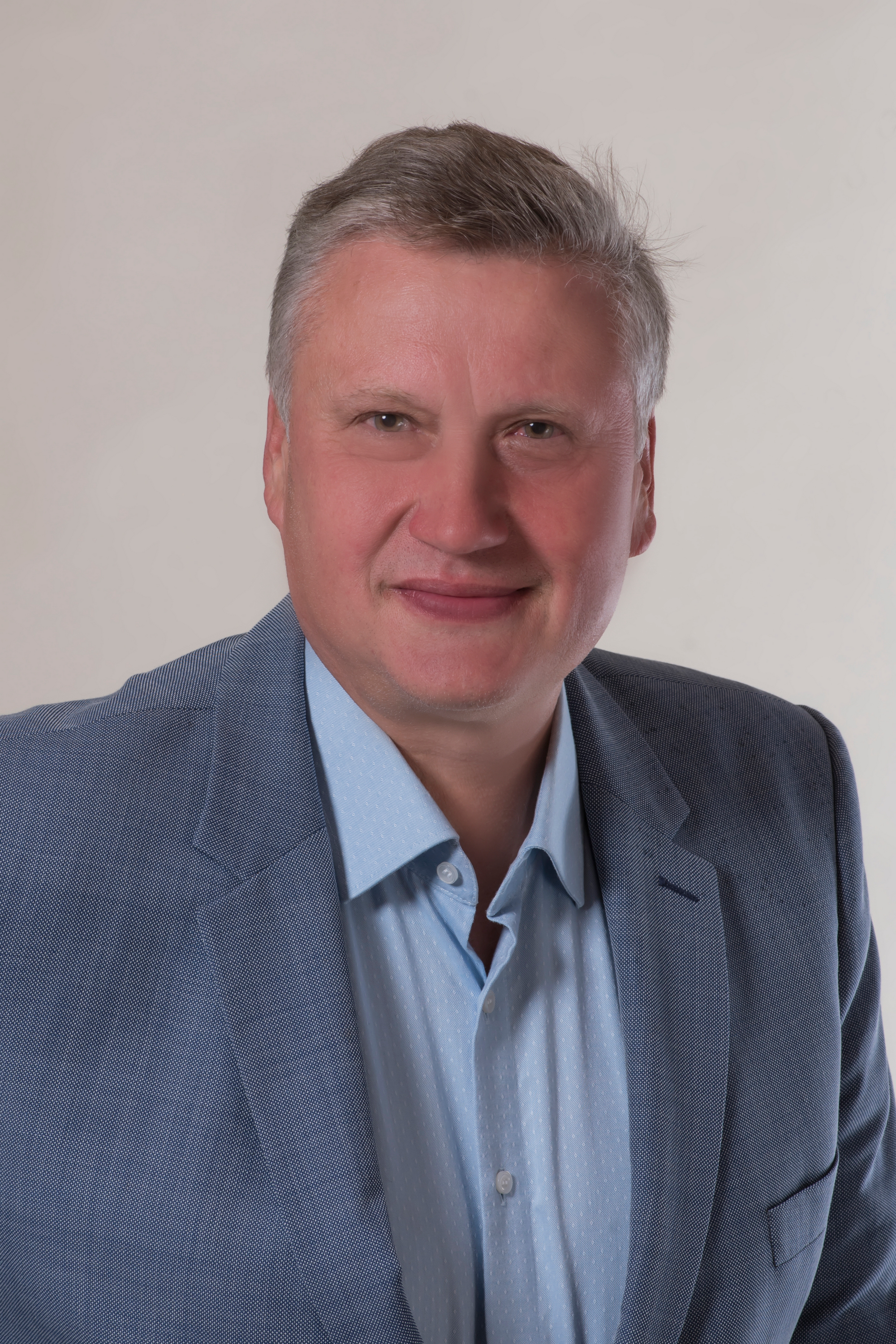
Jaanus Marrandi

Jaanus Marrandi (born 23 March 1963, Paide) is an Estonian politician who belongs to the Social Democratic Party.

He was the member of IX, X, XI, XIII Riigikogu.

From 2002 to 2003 he was the agricultural minister of Estonia (Estonian: Eesti põllumajandusminister).
