= Aivar Kokk =

Estonian politician (born 1960)

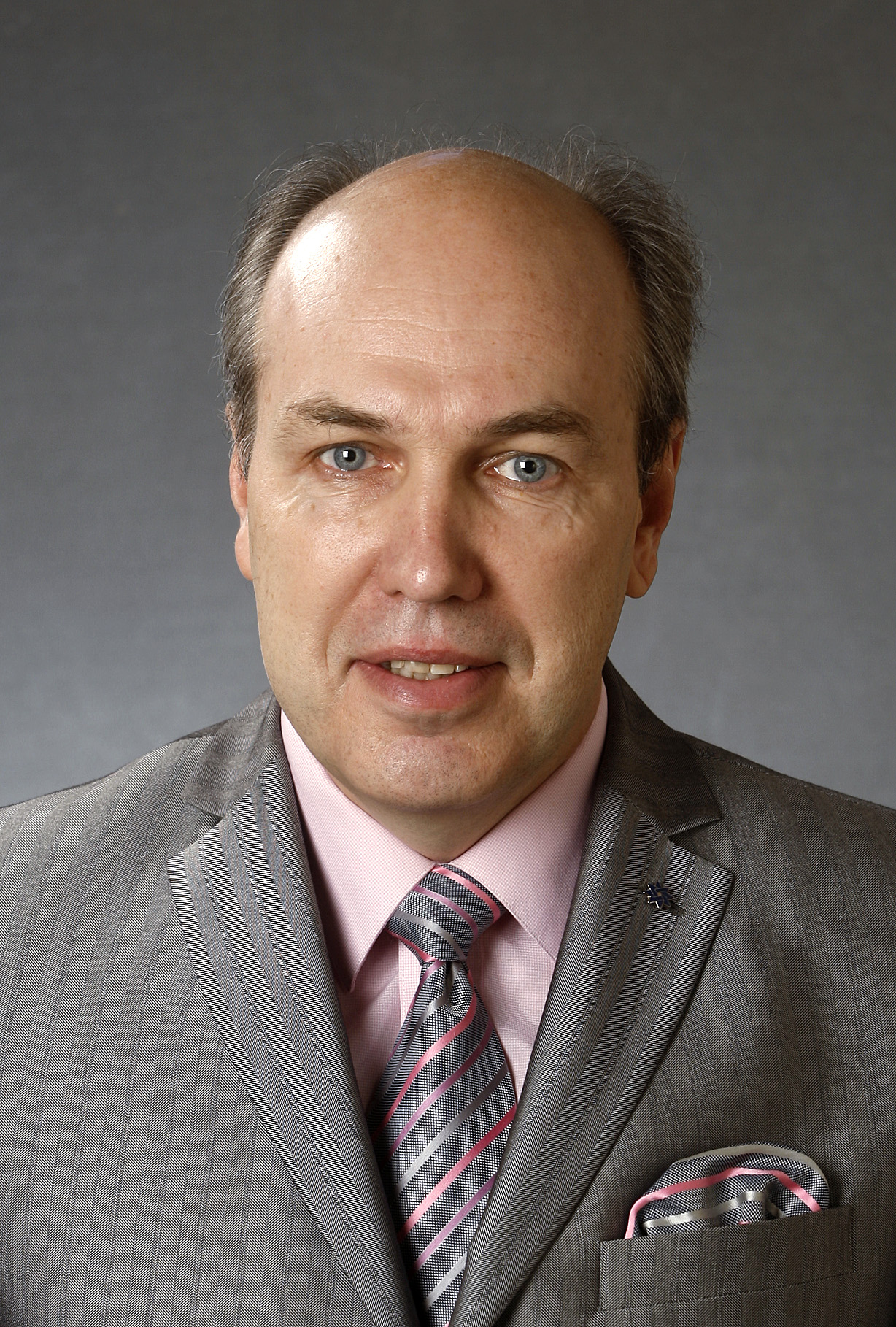
Kokk in 2011

Aivar Kokk (born 15 April 1960, in Jõgeva) is an Estonian politician. He has been a member of the XII, XIII and XIV Riigikogu.

In 1983 he graduated from Tallinn University of Technology with a degree in production of construction details and structures.

From 2004 to 2009 he was the governor of Jõgeva County.

Since 2011 he has been a member of the Pro Patria and Res Publica Union/Isamaa Party.
