= Nikolai Maspanov =

Estonian politician (born 1945)

Nikolai Maspanov (born 22 December 1945) is an Estonian politician. Born in Tallinn, he was a member of VIII Riigikogu.
