= Helmen Kütt =

Estonian politician (born 1961)

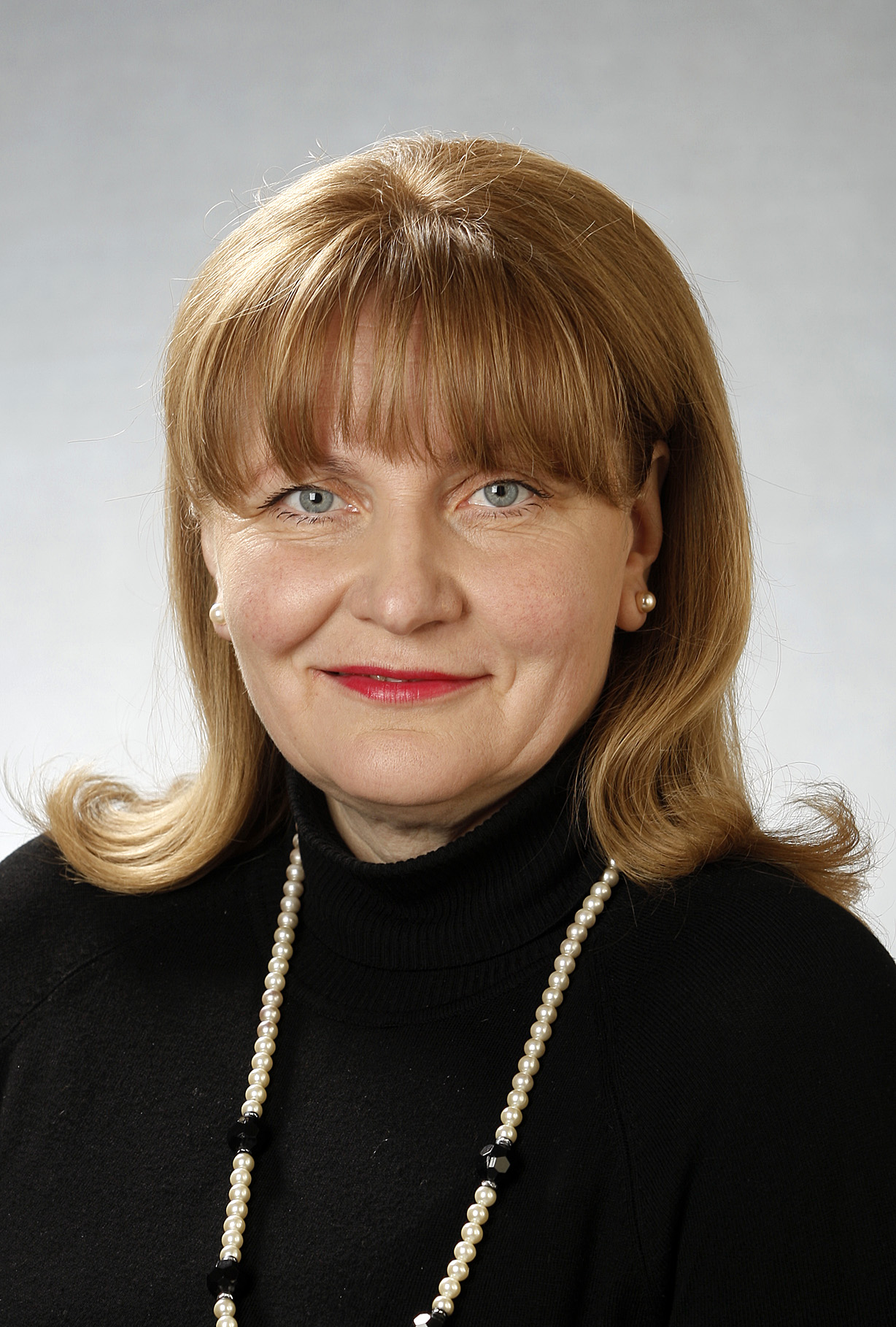

Minister of Social Protection
- In office 26 March 2014 – 30 March 2015
- President: Toomas Hendrik Ilves
- Preceded by: Taavi Rõivas
- Succeeded by: Margus Tsahkna

Personal details
- Born: 28 July 1961 (age 65) Viljandi, then part of Estonian SSR, Soviet Union
- Party: Social Democratic Party (Estonia)
- Education: Tallinna Pedagoogikaülikool

Helmen Kütt (born 28 July 1961) is an Estonian Social Democratic Party politician. She was the Minister of Social Protection in Taavi Rõivas´cabinet between 26 March 2014 and 30 March 2015. In the parliament Kütt represents the electoral district of Järva- and Viljandimaa .

Before entering into national politics, Kütt worked as the head of a Social Committee in Viljandi.

== Minister of Social Protection ==
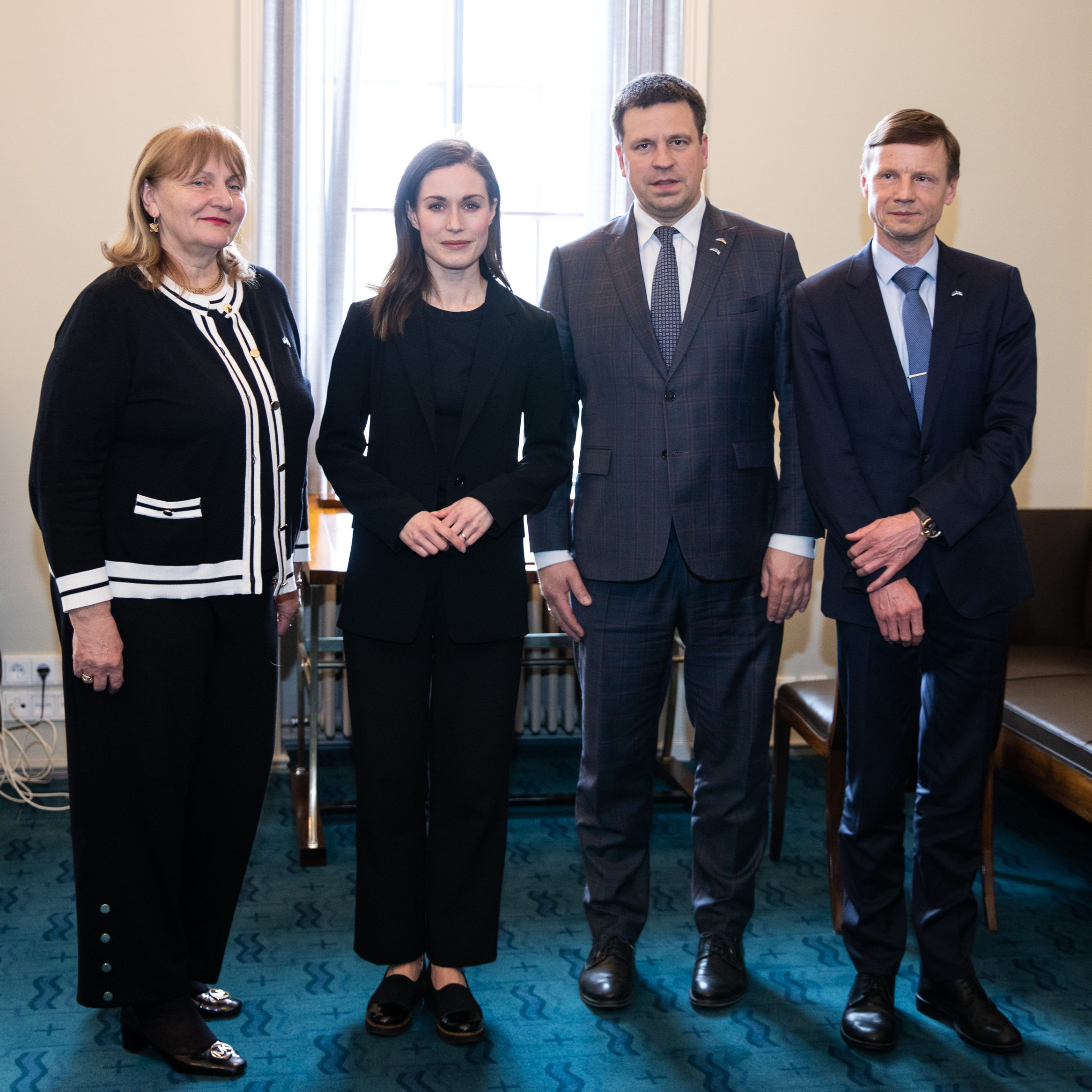
Kütt with Prime Minister Sanna Marin, Jüri Ratas and Aivar Sõerd in 2022

After the resignation of Andrus Ansip Taavi Rõivas became the new Prime Minister of Estonia and he formed the coalition with the Social Democratic Party (Andrus Ansip´s III government was a coalition between conservative IRL and classical liberal Reform Party). As a result of coalition negotiations the position of Minister of Social Affairs was separated into two separate ministers: Minister of Social Protection and Minister of Health and Labour.

Political offices
| Preceded by Taavi Rõivas (as Minister of Social Affairs) | Minister of Social Protection; 2014–2015 | Succeeded by Margus Tsahkna |
