= Olev Toomet =

Estonian politician

Olev Toomet (25 November 1929 Veriora Parish (now Räpina Parish), Võru County – 31 March 2009 Kõlleste Parish, Põlva County) is an Estonian politician. He was a member of VIII Riigikogu.
