= Jaan Pöör =

Estonian politician (born 1950)

Jaan Pöör (born 17 December 1950 in Loksa) is an Estonian politician. He was a member of VIII Riigikogu.

Pöör graduated from Tallinn University of Technology as an electrical engineer. From 1990 until 1995, he was the mayor of Alatskivi Parish. Jaan Pöör is a member of the People's Union.
