= Juhan Telgmaa =

Estonian politician (born 1946)

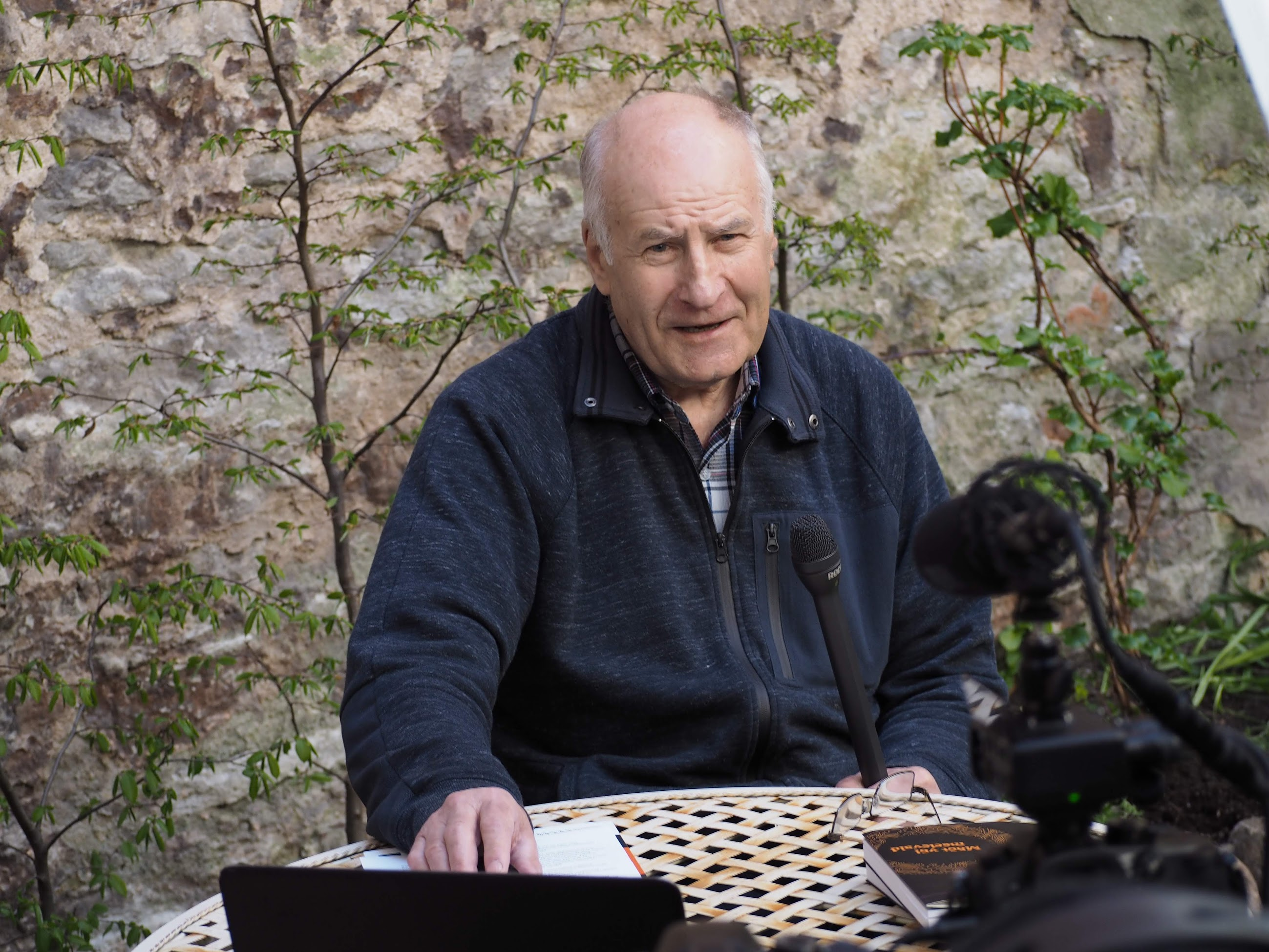
Juhan Telgmaa in 2019

Juhan Telgmaa (born 3 January 1946 in Juuru) is an Estonian politician. He was a member of VIII Riigikogu.
