= Andres Taimla =

Estonian politician (1947–2022)

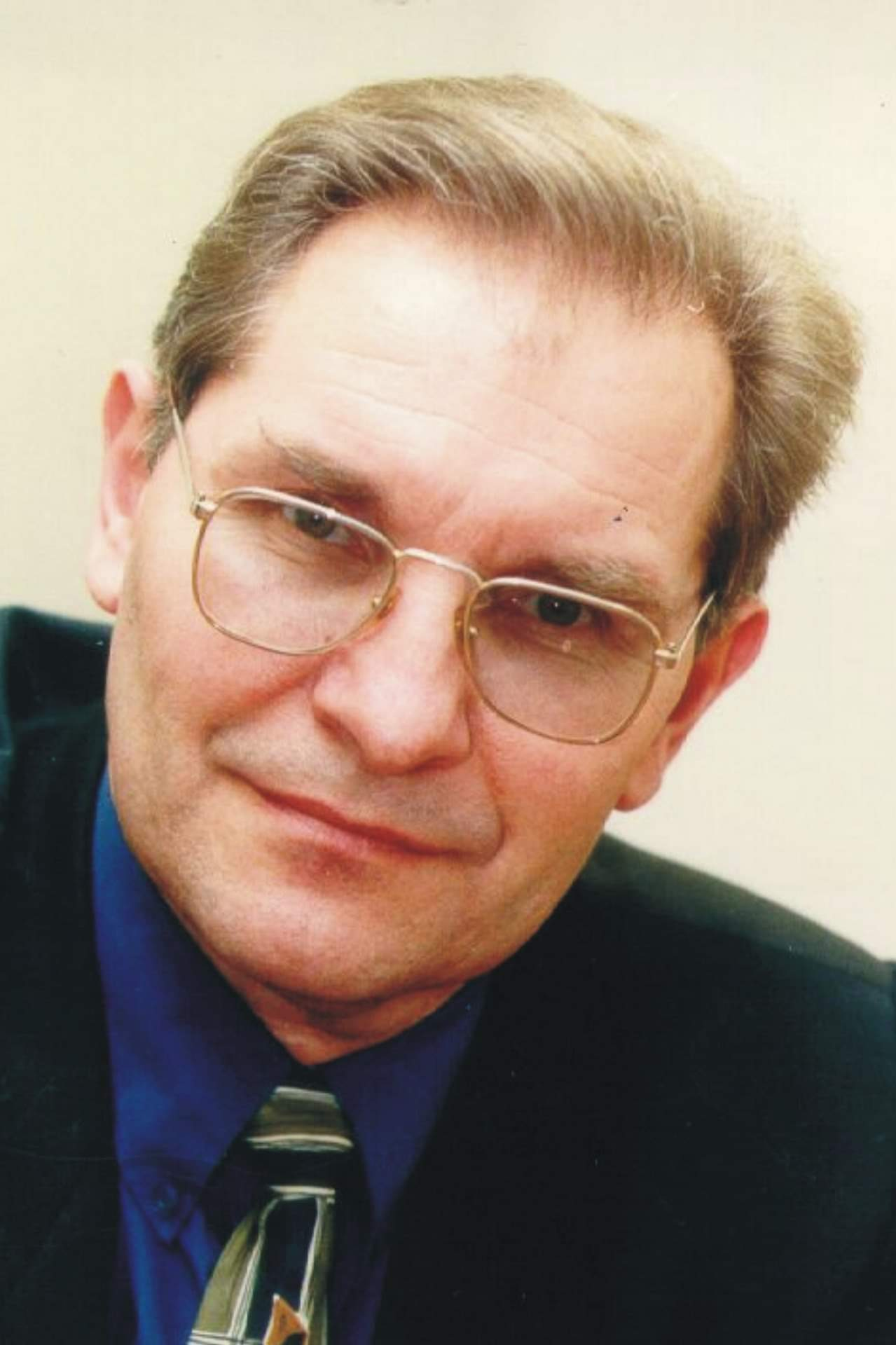

Andres Taimla (born 23 August 1947 Kuressaare - died 3 January 2022 Kadrina) was an Estonian politician. He was a member of VII, VIII and IX Riigikogu.
