= Ants Käärma =

Estonian agronomist and politician

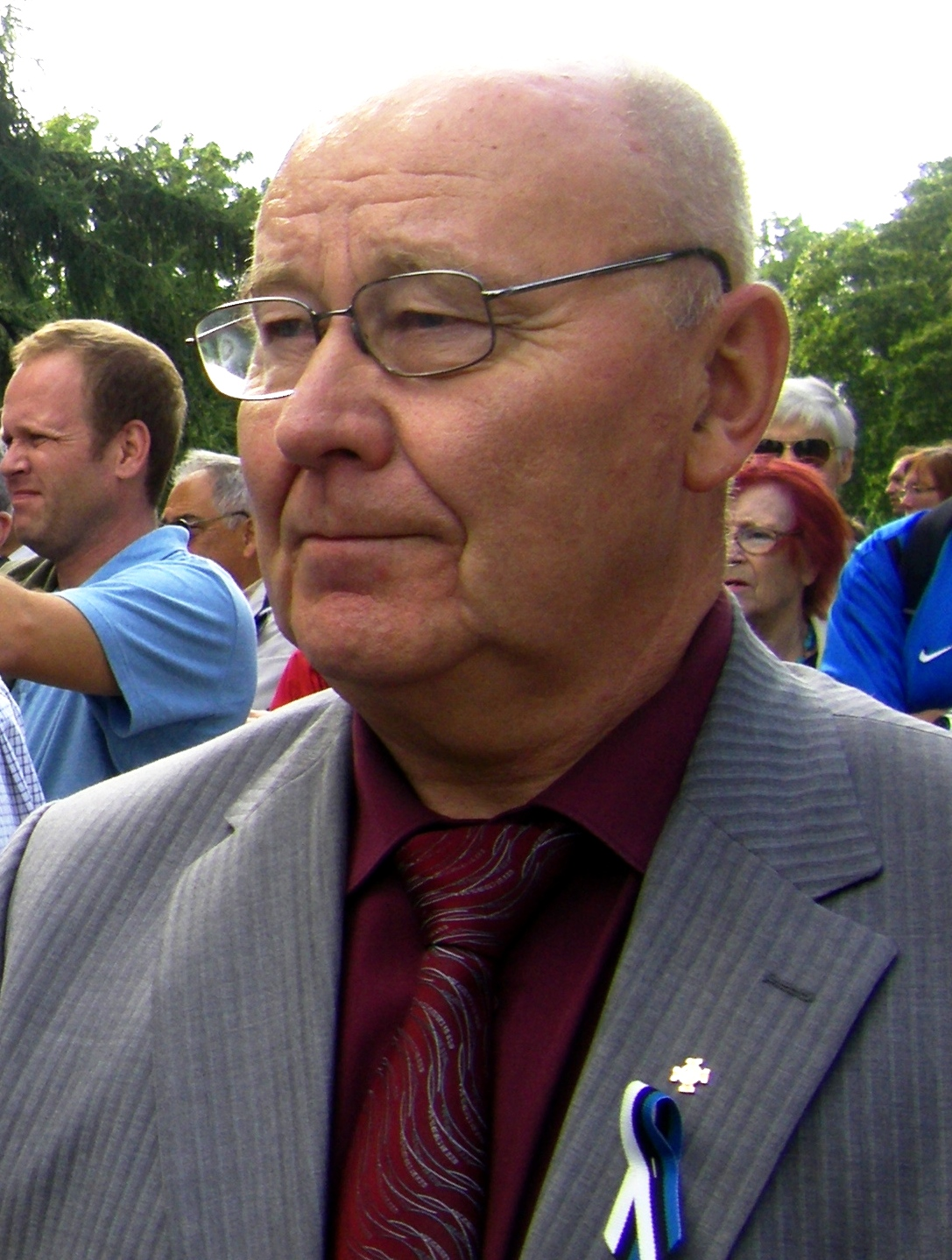
Ants Käärma in 2011

Ants Käärma (born 4 April 1942 in Võitra) is an Estonian agronomist and politician. He has been a member of the VII, VIII, and IX Riigikogu.
