= Valve Raudnask =

Estonian politician

Valve Raudnask (née Valve Purask; born 10 December 1936 in Aleksandri Parish, Võru County) is an Estonian journalist and politician. From 1963 until 1982, she worked as a journalist for the daily newspaper Noorte Hääl. From 1982 until 1983, she was a journalist for Õhtuleht. Later, from 1983 until 1994, she was the head of the newspaper Rahva Hääl, and from 1994 until 1995, the head of Eesti Sõnumid. She was a member of VIII Riigikogu, representing the Estonian Centre Party.

Noorte Hääl
