= Mai Treial =

Estonian politician (born 1952)

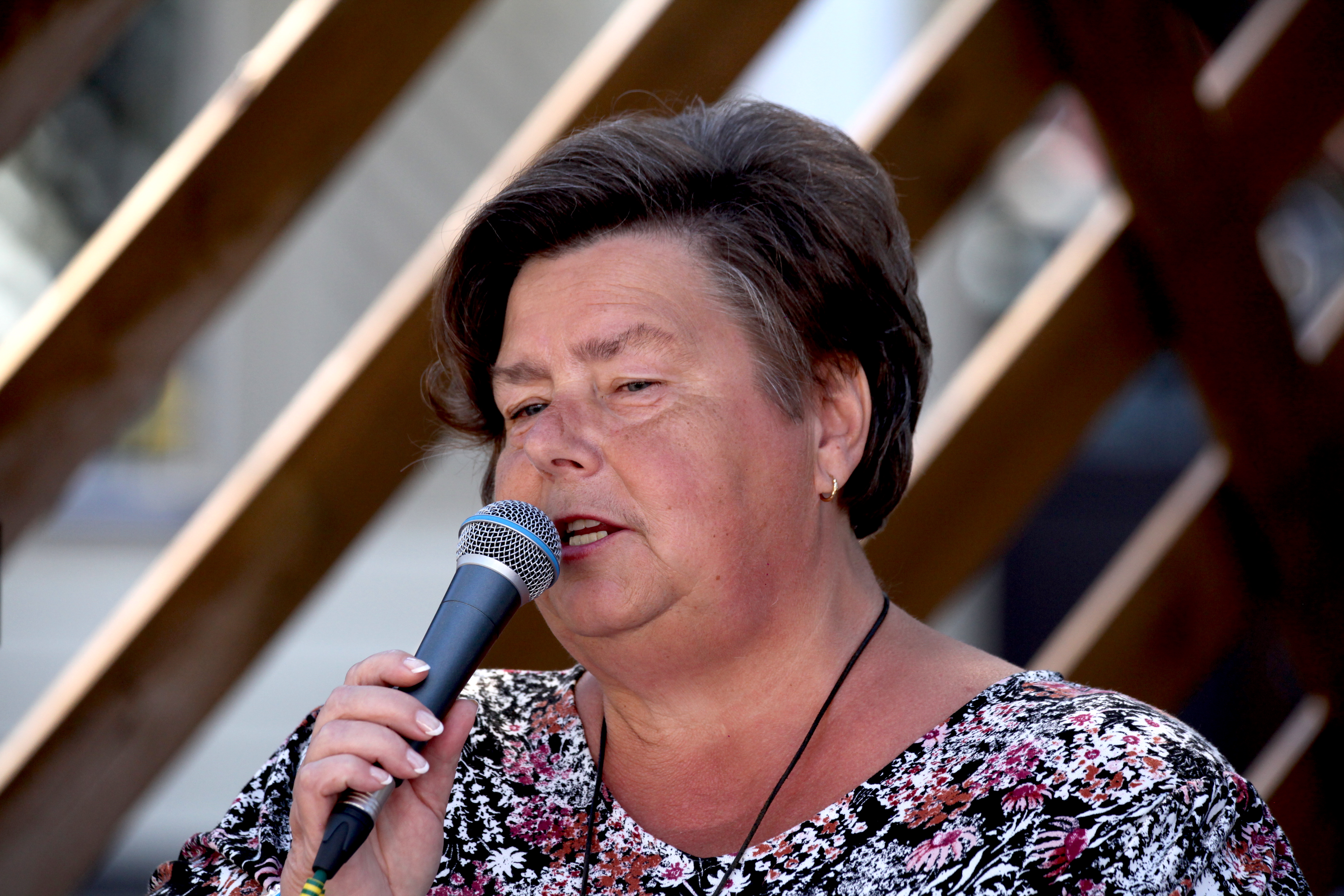
- Mai Treial at the Opinion Festival 2022 in Paide, Estonia

Member of the Riigikogu
- In office 1995–2011

Secretary of State of Jõgeva County
- In office 1987–1994

Chairman of Jõgeva City Council
- Incumbent
- Assumed office 8 January 2013

Member of Jõgeva City Council
- In office 1993–2005

Personal details
- Born: 22 May 1952 (age 74) Palupera, Estonia
- Party: People's Union of Estonia
- Education: University of Tartu

Mai Treial (born 22 May 1952) is an Estonian politician who served as a Riigikogu member from 1995 until 2011.

== Biography ==
A 1987 graduate of University of Tartu, she served in several government positions in Jõgeva County, including Secretary of State, and was a member of Jõgeva City Council from 1993 to 2005.

Treial is a Commander of the Order of Merit of the Republic of Italy (2005) and a Fourth Class recipient Order of the White Star (2002). She has a son and a daughter.

On 8 January 2013, Treial was elected as Chairman of Jõgeva City Council.
