= Igor Gräzin =

Estonian politician (born 1952)

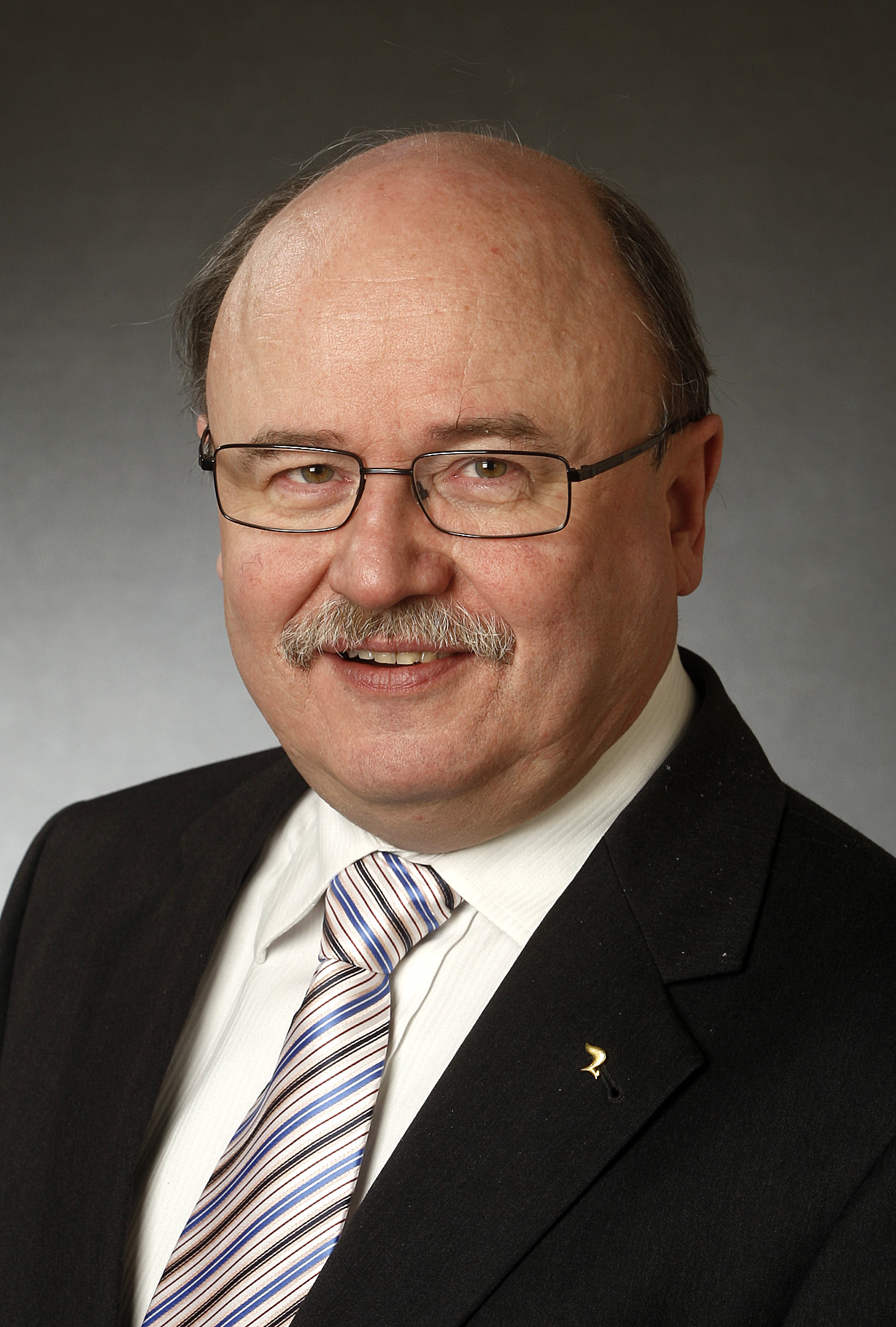
- Igor Gräzin in 2011

Member of the Tallinn City Council
- Incumbent
- Assumed office November 2021

Member of the European Parliament
- In office 5 September 2018 – 1 July 2019

Member of the Riigikogu
- In office 12 April 2005 – 5 September 2018
- In office 11 March 1995 – 13 March 1999

Member of the Supreme Soviet of the Soviet Union
- In office 1989–1991

Personal details
- Born: 27 June 1952 (age 74) Tartu, then part of Estonian SSR, Soviet Union
- Citizenship: Estonia
- Party: Independent (1990-1991, 2019-2022, 2024-present)
- Other political affiliations: Estonian Communist Party (1975-1990); Republican Party (US) (1991-2002); Reform Party (Estonia) (1994-2019); Centre Party (Estonia) (2022-2024)

Igor Gräzin (birth name: Russian: Игорь Николаевич Грязин, romanized: Igor Nikolayevich Gryazin (born 27 June 1952 in Tartu) is an Estonian academic and politician currently serving as a member of the Tallinn City Council. He is a former member of Riigikogu and former Member of the European Parliament. Currently sitting as an independent city councillor, he was formerly affiliated with the Reform Party until 2019 and the Centre Party until 2024.

== Academic career ==
Grazin began his career as a professor of law at Tartu State University. After the dissolution of the Soviet Union he taught at the University of Notre Dame in the United States until 2000, after that at the University Nord in Tallinn (as the Dean of the Law School and the Vice President). He has also served as a research fellow at the Woodrow Wilson Center in Washington D.C.

== Political career ==
Grazin was elected to the Supreme Soviet of the Soviet Union in 1989 as a candidate of the Popular Front of Estonia and served until its dissolution in 1991.

== Political views ==
Gräzin proposed restoring the Estonian maritime border to where it was before 1993, allowing Estonian access to the Nord Stream 1 gas pipeline.

He opposed the decision to sentence Saddam Hussein to death without a jury.

An Eurosceptic, he was a dissenting voice in the strongly pro-EU Reform Party. He was the only Riigikogu member to vote against ratifying the Treaty establishing a Constitution for Europe.

He supports abolishing the Estonian presidency and implementing a bicameral legislature with 80 members in the lower house and 40 in the upper house.

== Personal life ==
He is functionally trilingual in Estonian, English, and Russian.
