= Peep Aru =

Estonian politician (born 1953)

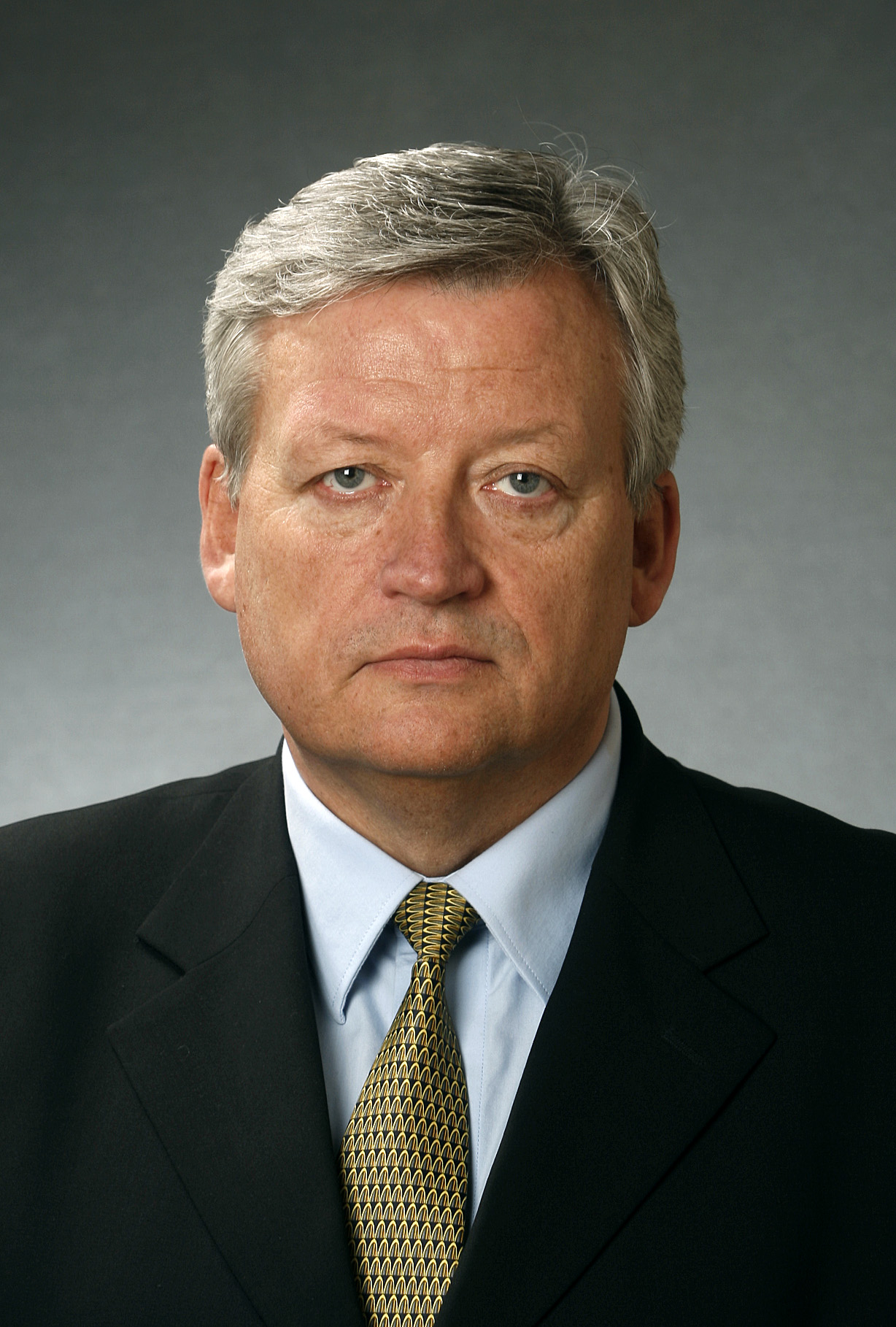
Peep Aru in 2011

Peep Aru (born 20 April 1953 in Abja-Paluoja) is an Estonian politician. He was a member of X, XI and XII Riigikogu and is the former Minister of Regional Affairs of Estonia. Aru was the Deputy Governor of Viljandi from 1989 to 1993, the Deputy Mayor of Viljandi from 1993 to 1996, and the Mayor of Viljandi from 1999 to 2003. He later served as Mayor again from 2005 to 2007.

He is a member of the Estonian Reform Party.
