= 8th Riigikogu =

Parliament of Estonia 1995–1999

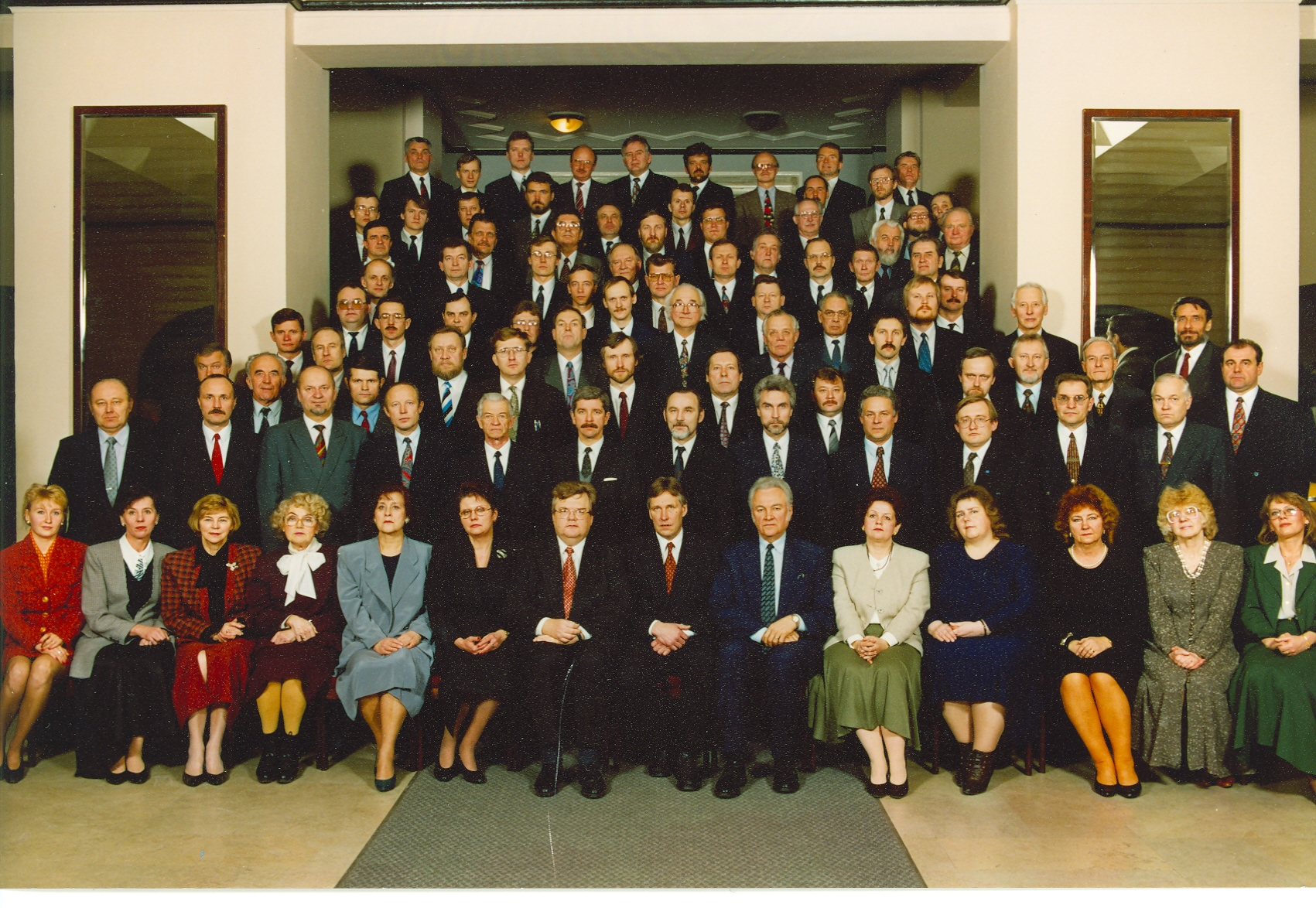
Opening ceremony of the 8th Riigikogu.

The 8th Riigikogu was the eighth legislature of the Estonian Parliament (Riigikogu). The legislature was elected after 1995 election.

== Election results ==
Alliance	Parties	Votes	%	Seats
Coalition Party and Country Union	Coalition Party; Country People's Union	174,248	32.2	41
Estonian Reform Party		87,531	16.2	19
Estonian Centre Party		76,634	14.2	16
RKEI and ERSP	Pro Patria National Coalition; Estonian National Independence Party	42,493	7.9	8
Moderates	Social Democratic Party; Country Centre Party	32,381	6.0	6
Our Home is Estonia	Estonian United People's Party; Russian Party in Estonia	31,763	5.9	6
The Right Wingers	People's Party of Republicans; Conservatives	27,053	5.0	5
Better Estonia/Estonian Citizen	Estonian People's Hunting Party; Estonian National Progress Party; Estonian Nationalist Party; Estonian Home Party; Party of South Estonian Citizens; Party of North Estonian Citizens	19,529	3.6	0
Future Estonia Party		13,907	2.6	0
Justice	Estonian Democratic Labour Party; Party of Legal Balance	12,248	2.3	0
Estonian Farmers' Party		8,146	1.5	0
KunRoh	Independent Royalist Party; Party of Estonian Greens	4,377	0.8	0
Estonian Nationalists Central Union		3,477	0.6	0
Forest Party		3,239	0.6	0
Estonian Blue Party		1,913	0.4	0
Estonian Democratic Union		316	0.1	0
Independents		1,444	0.3	0
Invalid/blank votes		5,142	–	–
Total		545,825	100	101
Registered voters/turnout		790,392	69.1	–

== Officers ==
Speaker of the Riigikogu: Toomas Savi.
