= Riigikogu electoral district no. 5 =

Electoral district of Estonia

Electoral district no. 5
- Valimisringkond nr 5
- Electoral District for the Riigikogu
- Location of Electoral district no. 5 within Estonia
- County: Hiiu; Lääne; Saare
- Population: 62,842 (2020)
- Electorate: 51,093 (2019)

Current Electoral District
- Created: 1992
- Seats: List: 6 (2011–present); 7 (1999–2011); 8 (1992–1999)
- Member of the Riigikogu: List: Enn Eesmaa (K); Helle-Moonika Helme (EKRE); Jaanus Karilaid (K); Heiki Kranich (RE); Kalle Laanet (RE); Urve Tiidus (RE)

Electoral district no. 5 (Estonian: Valimisringkond nr 5) is one of the 12 multi-member electoral districts of the Riigikogu, the national legislature of Estonia. The district was established as electoral district no. 6 in 1992 when the Riigikogu was re-established following Estonia's independence from the Soviet Union. It was renamed electoral district no. 5 in 1995 following the re-organisation of electoral districts. It is conterminous with the counties of Hiiu, Lääne and Saare. The district currently elects six of the 101 members of the Riigikogu using the open party-list proportional representation electoral system. At the 2019 parliamentary election it had 51,093 registered electors.

== Electoral system ==
Electoral district no. 5 currently elects six of the 101 members of the Riigikogu using the open party-list proportional representation electoral system. The allocation of seats is carried out in three stages. In the first stage, any individual candidate, regardless of whether they are a party or independent candidate, who receives more votes than the district's simple quota (Hare quota: valid votes in district/number of seats allocated to district) is elected via a personal mandate. In the second stage, district mandates are allocated to parties by dividing their district votes by the district's simple quota. Only parties that reach the 5% national threshold compete for district mandates and any personal mandates won by the party are subtracted from the party's district mandates. Prior to 2003 if a party's surplus/remainder votes was equal to or greater than 75% of the district's simple quota it received one additional district mandate. Any unallocated district seats are added to a national pool of compensatory seats. In the final stage, compensatory mandates are calculated based on the national vote and using a modified D'Hondt method. Only parties that reach the 5% national threshold compete for compensatory seats and any personal and district mandates won by the party are subtracted from the party's compensatory mandates. Though calculated nationally, compensatory mandates are allocated at the district level.

=== Seats ===
Seats allocated to electoral district no. 5 by the National Electoral Committee of Estonia at each election was as follows:

- 2023 - 6
- 2019 - 6
- 2015 - 6
- 2011 - 6
- 2007 - 7
- 2003 - 7
- 1999 - 7
- 1995 - 8
- 1992 - 8

== Election results ==
=== Summary ===
Election	Left EÜVP/EVP/ESDTP/Õ/V			Constitution K/EÜRP/MKOE			Social Democrats SDE/RM/M			Greens EER/NJ/R			Centre K/R			Reform RE			Isamaa I/IRL/I/I\ERSP/I			Conservative People's EKRE/ERL/EME/KMÜ		
Election	Votes	%	Seats	Votes	%	Seats	Votes	%	Seats	Votes	%	Seats	Votes	%	Seats	Votes	%	Seats	Votes	%	Seats	Votes	%	Seats
2023							4,977	13.88%	1	311	0.87%	0	4,030	11.24%	0	9,912	27.64%	1	2,814	7.85%	0	6,951	19.39%	1
2019	13	0.04%	0				3,414	10.67%	0	639	2.00%	0	5,736	17.93%	1	9,150	28.60%	1	3,347	10.46%	0	6,894	21.55%	1
2015	15	0.04%	0				5,018	14.90%	1	590	1.75%	0	4,368	12.97%	1	10,489	31.15%	2	4,938	14.66%	1	3,770	11.20%	0
2011							8,187	24.06%	1	1,820	5.35%	0	5,155	15.15%	1	11,134	32.72%	2	5,595	16.44%	1	599	1.76%	0
2007	29	0.08%	0	17	0.05%	0	4,081	11.95%	1	2,541	7.44%	0	6,948	20.35%	1	10,758	31.51%	2	5,166	15.13%	1	3,049	8.93%	0
2003	129	0.40%	0	109	0.34%	0	2,433	7.60%	0				7,455	23.29%	1	4,807	15.02%	1	2,065	6.45%	0	5,384	16.82%	1
1999				416	1.29%	0	6,093	18.91%	1				8,423	26.14%	1	5,779	17.94%	1	3,487	10.82%	0	2,852	8.85%	0
1995	774	2.04%	0	247	0.65%	0	3,103	8.17%	0	185	0.49%	0	6,343	16.69%	1	8,497	22.36%	1	2,245	5.91%	0	13,595	35.78%	2
1992	1,117	3.33%	0				3,604	10.75%	0	633	1.89%	0	2,850	8.50%	0				4,416	13.18%	1			

(Excludes compensatory seats)

=== Detailed ===
Party has received at least 5% of the vote nationally and is entitled to compete for district seats.

==== 2023 ====
Results of the 2023 parliamentary election held on 3 March 2019:

Party		Votes per county					Total Votes	%	Seats			
Party		Hiiu	Lääne	Saare	Expat- riates	Elec- tronic	Total Votes	%	Per.	Dis.	Com.	Tot.
Estonian Reform Party	REF	442	969	1,699	32	6,597	9,912	27.64%	0	1	0	1
Conservative People's Party of Estonia	EKRE	475	1,558	2,668	55	1,967	6,951	19.39%	0	1	0	1
Estonia 200	EE200	227	718	1,092	9	3,971	6,116	17.06%	0	1	0	1
Social Democratic Party	SDE	479	469	1,142	6	2,785	4,977	13.88%	0	1	0	1
Estonian Centre Party	KESK	348	964	1,116	4	1,505	4,030	11.24%	0	0	1	1
Isamaa	IE	199	372	787	5	1,389	2,814	7.85%	0	0	0	0
Parempoolsed		54	75	141	3	453	745	2.08%	0	0	0	0
Estonian Greens	EER	11	54	60	8	177	311	0.87%	0	0	0	0
Valid votes		2,235	5,179	8,705	115	18,844	35,856	100.00%	0	4	1	5
Rejected votes		60	100	69	1	0	161	0.45%				
Total polled		2,251	5,239	8,774	116	18,844	36,017	65.68%				
Registered electors		8,241	15,250	27,051	4,291		54,833					

The following candidates were elected:

- District mandates - Helle-Moonika Helme (EKRE), 3,275 votes; Madis Kallas (SDE), 2,254 votes; Kalle Laanet (REF), 4,523 votes; and Grigore-Kalev Stoicescu (EE200), 3,664 votes;.
- Compensatory mandates - Jaanus Karilaid (KESK), 2,162 votes.

==== 2019 ====
Results of the 2019 parliamentary election held on 3 March 2019:

Party		Votes per county					Total Votes	%	Seats			
Party		Hiiu	Lääne	Saare	Expat- riates	Elec- tronic	Total Votes	%	Per.	Dis.	Com.	Tot.
Estonian Reform Party	RE	558	1,407	1,843	32	5,310	9,150	28.60%	0	1	2	3
Conservative People's Party of Estonia	EKRE	545	1,713	2,263	55	2,318	6,894	21.55%	0	1	0	1
Estonian Centre Party	K	506	1,426	2,105	12	1,687	5,736	17.93%	0	1	1	2
Social Democratic Party	SDE	498	494	683	8	1,731	3,414	10.67%	0	0	0	0
Isamaa	I	170	429	1,157	18	1,573	3,347	10.46%	0	0	0	0
Estonia 200		48	120	456	1	779	1,404	4.39%	0	0	0	0
Estonian Free Party	EVA	78	114	128	0	324	644	2.01%	0	0	0	0
Estonian Greens	EER	29	113	128	5	364	639	2.00%	0	0	0	0
Harry Raudvere (Independent)		29	62	187	0	128	406	1.27%	0	0	0	0
Estonian Biodiversity Party		13	55	93	1	188	350	1.09%	0	0	0	0
Estonian United Left Party	EÜVP	1	4	6	0	2	13	0.04%	0	0	0	0
Valid votes		2,475	5,937	9,049	132	14,404	31,997	100.00%	0	3	3	6
Rejected votes		23	86	100	0	0	209	0.65%				
Total polled		2,498	6,023	9,149	132	14,404	32,206	63.03%				
Registered electors		8,016	15,607	27,068	402		51,093					

The following candidates were elected:

- District mandates - Enn Eesmaa (K), 1,805 votes; Helle-Moonika Helme (EKRE), 3,202 votes; and Kalle Laanet (RE), 3,344 votes.
- Compensatory mandates - Jaanus Karilaid (K), 1,661 votes; Heiki Kranich (RE), 390 votes; and Urve Tiidus (RE), 2,617 votes.

==== 2015 ====
Results of the 2015 parliamentary election held on 1 March 2015:

Party		Votes per county					Total Votes	%	Seats			
Party		Hiiu	Lääne	Saare	Expat- riates	Elec- tronic	Total Votes	%	Per.	Dis.	Com.	Tot.
Estonian Reform Party	RE	1,147	2,224	3,092	21	4,005	10,489	31.15%	0	2	1	3
Social Democratic Party	SDE	567	1,231	1,421	7	1,792	5,018	14.90%	0	1	0	1
Pro Patria and Res Publica Union	IRL	439	1,045	1,782	30	1,642	4,938	14.66%	0	1	0	1
Estonian Centre Party	K	420	1,423	1,953	6	566	4,368	12.97%	0	1	0	1
Estonian Free Party	EVA	188	1,027	1,406	7	1,669	4,297	12.76%	0	1	0	1
Conservative People's Party of Estonia	EKRE	380	1,215	1,154	9	1,012	3,770	11.20%	0	0	0	0
Estonian Greens	EER	31	107	154	2	296	590	1.75%	0	0	0	0
Estonian Independence Party	EIP	5	30	49	1	28	113	0.34%	0	0	0	0
Party of People's Unity	RÜE	15	21	20	0	19	75	0.22%	0	0	0	0
Estonian United Left Party	EÜVP	0	5	9	0	1	15	0.04%	0	0	0	0
Valid votes		3,192	8,328	11,040	83	11,030	33,673	100.00%	0	6	1	7
Rejected votes		30	77	70	1	0	178	0.53%				
Total polled		3,222	8,405	11,110	84	11,030	33,851	60.41%				
Registered electors		8,191	19,657	28,101	84		56,033					

The following candidates were elected:

- District mandates - Raivo Aeg (IRL), 2,001 votes; Andres Ammas (EVA), 1,859 votes; Enn Eesmaa (K), 2,219 votes; Hannes Hanso (SDE), 2,038 votes; Kalle Laanet (RE), 2,388 votes; and Urve Tiidus (RE), 4,117 votes.
- Compensatory mandates - Lauri Luik (RE), 855 votes.

==== 2011 ====
Results of the 2011 parliamentary election held on 6 March 2011:

Party		Votes per county					Total Votes	%	Seats			
Party		Hiiu	Lääne	Saare	Expat- riates	Elec- tronic	Total Votes	%	Per.	Dis.	Com.	Tot.
Estonian Reform Party	RE	1,237	2,742	3,737	47	3,371	11,134	32.72%	0	2	1	3
Social Democratic Party	SDE	1,138	2,169	2,845	7	2,028	8,187	24.06%	0	1	2	3
Pro Patria and Res Publica Union	IRL	489	1,585	1,708	56	1,757	5,595	16.44%	0	1	0	1
Estonian Centre Party	K	424	1,569	2,566	4	592	5,155	15.15%	0	1	0	1
Estonian Greens	EER	126	722	454	2	516	1,820	5.35%	0	0	0	0
People's Union of Estonia	ERL	57	217	231	2	92	599	1.76%	0	0	0	0
Raimond Ellik (Independent)		12	27	336	0	71	446	1.31%	0	0	0	0
Party of Estonian Christian Democrats	EKD	31	152	151	1	60	395	1.16%	0	0	0	0
Rein Teesalu (Independent)		21	61	134	0	55	271	0.80%	0	0	0	0
Üllar Õun (Independent)		11	37	86	0	19	153	0.45%	0	0	0	0
Estonian Independence Party	EIP	10	40	56	0	33	139	0.41%	0	0	0	0
Eugen Veges (Independent)		6	30	32	0	29	97	0.29%	0	0	0	0
Russian Party in Estonia	VEE	0	29	5	0	3	37	0.11%	0	0	0	0
Valid votes		3,562	9,380	12,341	119	8,626	34,028	100.00%	0	5	3	8
Rejected votes		29	97	115	12	0	253	0.74%				
Total polled		3,591	9,477	12,456	131	8,626	34,281	58.52%				
Registered electors		8,491	20,887	29,074	131		58,583					

The following candidates were elected:

- District mandates - Kalle Laanet (K), 2,566 votes; Tõnis Palts (IRL), 2.243 votes; Neeme Suur (SDE), 1,970 votes; Jaanus Tamkivi (RE), 3,171 votes; and Urve Tiidus (RE), 3,123 votes.
- Compensatory mandates - Kalev Kotkas (SDE), 1,565 votes; Kajar Lember (SDE), 1,363 votes; and Lauri Luik (RE), 1,931 votes.

==== 2007 ====
Results of the 2007 parliamentary election held on 4 March 2007:

Party		Votes per county					Total Votes	%	Seats			
Party		Hiiu	Lääne	Saare	Expat- riates	Elec- tronic	Total Votes	%	Per.	Dis.	Com.	Tot.
Estonian Reform Party	RE	1,058	3,692	5,397	22	589	10,758	31.51%	0	2	1	3
Estonian Centre Party	K	661	2,490	3,673	13	111	6,948	20.35%	0	1	0	1
Pro Patria and Res Publica Union	IRL	618	1,919	2,108	103	418	5,166	15.13%	0	1	0	1
Social Democratic Party	SDE	1,269	1,387	1,159	16	250	4,081	11.95%	0	1	0	1
People's Union of Estonia	ERL	712	588	1,662	4	83	3,049	8.93%	0	0	0	0
Estonian Greens	EER	279	1,130	945	7	180	2,541	7.44%	0	0	1	1
Party of Estonian Christian Democrats	EKD	132	392	860	4	48	1,436	4.21%	0	0	0	0
Estonian Independence Party	EIP	5	40	44	0	4	93	0.27%	0	0	0	0
Estonian Left Party	EVP	1	12	15	0	1	29	0.08%	0	0	0	0
Russian Party in Estonia	VEE	2	11	7	0	0	20	0.06%	0	0	0	0
Constitution Party	K	0	9	8	0	0	17	0.05%	0	0	0	0
Valid votes		4,737	11,670	15,878	169	1,684	34,138	100.00%	0	5	2	7
Rejected votes		40	123	139	8	0	310	0.90%				
Total polled		4,777	11,793	16,017	177	1,684	34,448	58.77%				
Registered electors		8,494	20,961	28,979	177		58,611					

The following candidates were elected:

- District mandates - Tarmo Kõuts (IRL), 2,847 votes; Ain Seppik (K), 3,989 votes; Imre Sooäär (RE), 1,778 votes; Jaanus Tamkivi (RE), 3,615 votes; and Andres Tarand (SDE), 1,132 votes.
- Compensatory mandates - Aleksei Lotman (EER), 1,316 votes; and Lauri Luik (RE), 1,310 votes.

==== 2003 ====
Results of the 2003 parliamentary election held on 2 March 2003:

Party		Votes per county				Total Votes	%	Seats			
Party		Hiiu	Lääne	Saare	Expat- riates	Total Votes	%	Per.	Dis.	Com.	Tot.
Union for the Republic–Res Publica	ÜVE-RP	939	3,872	3,527	87	8,425	26.32%	0	2	0	2
Estonian Centre Party	K	938	2,464	4,039	14	7,455	23.29%	0	1	0	1
People's Union of Estonia	ERL	310	1,398	3,670	6	5,384	16.82%	0	1	0	1
Estonian Reform Party	RE	877	1,855	2,057	18	4,807	15.02%	0	1	0	1
Moderate People's Party	RM	1,372	602	445	14	2,433	7.60%	0	0	0	0
Pro Patria Union Party	I	226	831	934	74	2,065	6.45%	0	0	0	0
Estonian Christian People's Party	EKRP	44	279	507	4	834	2.61%	0	0	0	0
Estonian Independence Party	EIP	19	68	163	0	250	0.78%	0	0	0	0
Estonian Social Democratic Labour Party	ESDTP	8	28	93	0	129	0.40%	0	0	0	0
Estonian United People's Party	EÜRP	5	102	2	0	109	0.34%	0	0	0	0
Eino Paju (Independent)		5	30	50	0	85	0.27%	0	0	0	0
Russian Party in Estonia	VEE	1	25	9	0	35	0.11%	0	0	0	0
Valid votes		4,744	11,554	15,496	217	32,011	100.00%	0	5	0	5
Rejected votes		36	122	150	8	316	0.98%				
Total polled		4,780	11,676	15,646	225	32,327	55.09%				
Registered electors		8,516	21,044	28,895	225	58,680					
Turnout		56.13%	55.48%	54.15%	100.00%	55.09%					

The following candidates were elected:

- District mandates - Andres Lipstok (RE), 2,037 votes; Jüri Saar (ERL), 2,364 votes; Ain Seppik (K), 3,216 votes; Imre Sooäär (ÜVE-RP), 982 votes; and Olari Taal (ÜVE-RP), 3,816 votes.

==== 1999 ====
Results of the 1999 parliamentary election held on 7 March 1999:

Party		Votes per county				Total Votes	%	Seats			
Party		Hiiu	Lääne	Saare	Expat- riates	Total Votes	%	Per.	Dis.	Com.	Tot.
Estonian Centre Party	K	738	2,829	4,847	9	8,423	26.14%	0	1	1	2
Moderate	M	1,860	1,898	2,247	88	6,093	18.91%	0	1	1	2
Estonian Reform Party	RE	765	2,789	2,207	18	5,779	17.94%	0	1	0	1
Pro Patria Union	I	469	1,369	1,387	262	3,487	10.82%	0	0	1	1
Estonian Coalition Party	KE	355	768	1,803	13	2,939	9.12%	0	0	0	0
Estonian Country People's Party	EME	132	953	1,765	2	2,852	8.85%	0	0	1	1
Estonian Christian People's Party	EKRP	106	577	710	9	1,402	4.35%	0	0	0	0
Estonian United People's Party	EÜRP	156	134	126	0	416	1.29%	0	0	0	0
Estonian Blue Party	ESE	49	90	235	3	377	1.17%	0	0	0	0
Russian Party in Estonia	VEE	47	85	17	0	149	0.46%	0	0	0	0
Farmers' Assembly		11	30	75	6	122	0.38%	0	0	0	0
Eino Paju (Independent)		6	15	53	0	74	0.23%	0	0	0	0
Ilmar Altvälja (Independent)		9	37	13	4	63	0.20%	0	0	0	0
Progress Party		18	5	22	0	45	0.14%	0	0	0	0
Valid votes		4,721	11,579	15,507	414	32,221	100.00%	0	3	4	7
Rejected votes		75	185	244	6	510	1.56%				
Total polled		4,796	11,764	15,751	420	32,731	54.85%				
Registered electors		8,438	21,342	29,472	420	59,672					
Turnout		56.84%	55.12%	53.44%	100.00%	54.85%					

The following candidates were elected:

- District mandates - Kalev Kotkas (M), 1,730 votes; Anti Liiv (K), 3,682 votes; and Andres Lipstok (RE), 3,376 votes.
- Compensatory mandates - Vambo Kaal (M), 1,584 votes; Mart Nutt (I), 1,393 votes; Tiit Tammsaar (EME), 1,555 votes; and Laine Tarvis (K), 2,452 votes.

==== 1995 ====
Results of the 1995 parliamentary election held on 5 March 1995:

Party		Votes per county				Total Votes	%	Seats			
Party		Hiiu	Lääne	Saare	Expat- riates	Total Votes	%	Per.	Dis.	Com.	Tot.
Coalition Party and Rural People's Association	KMÜ	2,149	3,361	8,029	56	13,595	35.78%	0	2	0	2
Estonian Reform Party	RE	1,271	4,327	2,825	74	8,497	22.36%	1	0	2	3
Estonian Centre Party	K	689	1,916	3,718	20	6,343	16.69%	0	1	0	1
Moderate	M	282	785	1,983	53	3,103	8.17%	0	0	0	0
Pro Patria and ERSP Union	I\ERSP	482	720	594	449	2,245	5.91%	0	0	0	0
Justice	Õ	431	135	206	2	774	2.04%	0	0	0	0
The Right Wingers	P	81	371	232	56	740	1.95%	0	0	0	0
Better Estonia/Estonian Citizen	PE/EK	57	190	476	9	732	1.93%	0	0	0	0
Estonian Farmers' Party	ETRE	123	426	80	1	630	1.66%	0	0	0	0
Estonian Future Party	TEE	51	185	280	4	520	1.37%	0	0	0	0
Our Home is Estonia	MKOE	18	194	33	2	247	0.65%	0	0	0	0
Fourth Force	NJ	66	63	53	3	185	0.49%	0	0	0	0
Forest Party		24	76	55	4	159	0.42%	0	0	0	0
Estonian National Federation	ERKL	14	33	89	0	136	0.36%	0	0	0	0
Blue Party	SE	8	12	41	2	63	0.17%	0	0	0	0
Estonian Democratic Union	EDL	7	16	8	0	31	0.08%	0	0	0	0
Valid votes		5,753	12,810	18,702	735	38,000	100.00%	1	3	2	6
Rejected votes		51	109	157	0	317	0.83%				
Total polled		5,804	12,919	18,859	735	38,317	68.15%				
Registered electors		8,184	19,129	28,177	735	56,225					
Turnout		70.92%	67.54%	66.93%	100.00%	68.15%					

The following candidates were elected:

- Personal mandates - Andres Lipstok (RE), 6,289 votes.
- District mandates - Raivo Kallas (KMÜ), 2,139 votes; Anti Liiv (K), 3,193 votes; and Ülo Uluots (KMÜ), 2,753 votes.
- Compensatory mandates - Jürgen Ligi (RE), 460 votes; and Daimar Liiv (RE), 181 votes.

==== 1992 ====
Results of the 1992 parliamentary election held on 20 September 1992:

Party		Votes per county				Total Votes	%	Seats			
Party		Hiiu	Lääne	Saare	Expat- riates	Total Votes	%	Per.	Dis.	Com.	Tot.
Independent Kings	SK	993	1,868	3,859	9	6,729	20.08%	1	0	0	1
Pro Patria	I	562	2,016	1,401	437	4,416	13.18%	0	1	1	2
Moderate	M	1,258	323	1,986	37	3,604	10.75%	0	0	1	1
Ülo Uluots (Independent)		109	2,895	378	16	3,398	10.14%	0	0	0	0
Safe Home	KK	485	1,502	1,191	42	3,220	9.61%	0	0	1	1
Popular Front of Estonia	R	315	420	2,086	29	2,850	8.50%	0	0	1	1
Estonian National Independence Party	ERSP	164	432	1,688	297	2,581	7.70%	0	0	0	0
Farmers' Assembly		83	209	1,215	55	1,562	4.66%	0	0	0	0
Left Option	V	299	152	664	2	1,117	3.33%	0	0	0	0
Estonian Union of Pensioners	EPL	97	516	481	6	1,100	3.28%	0	0	0	0
Estonian Citizen	EK	70	243	476	19	808	2.41%	0	0	2	2
Greens	R	123	192	300	18	633	1.89%	0	0	0	0
Handicapped Union		62	198	186	0	446	1.33%	0	0	0	0
Estonian Entrepreneurs' Party	EEE	90	70	148	6	314	0.94%	0	0	0	0
Aarne Maripuu (Independent)		207	26	63	5	301	0.90%	0	0	0	0
National Party of the Illegally Repressed	ÕRRE	9	149	94	10	262	0.78%	0	0	0	0
Arnold-Aare Kivisikk (Independent)		127	20	29	0	176	0.53%	0	0	0	0
Valid votes		5,053	11,231	16,245	988	33,517	100.00%	1	1	6	8
Rejected votes		117	229	374	0	720	2.10%				
Total polled		5,170	11,460	16,619	988	34,237	65.48%				
Registered electors		7,715	17,697	25,855	1,018	52,285					
Turnout		67.01%	64.76%	64.28%	97.05%	65.48%					

The following candidates were elected:

- Personal mandates - Kirill Teiter (SK), 6,314 votes.
- District mandates - Heiki Kranich (I), 1,335 votes.
- Compensatory mandates - Rein Hanson (KK), 2,120 votes; Rein Helme (EK), 196 votes; Vambo Kaal (M), 1,252 votes; Krista Kilvet (R), 670 votes; Jüri Põld (I), 1,041 votes; and Aime Sügis (EK), 69 votes.
