= List of Estonian historians =

A list of notable historians from Estonia:

== A ==
- Karin Aasma
- Tiit Aleksejev

== H ==
- Vello Helk
- Mart Helme
- August Wilhelm Hupel

== I ==
- Magnus Ilmjärv
- Richard Indreko

== J ==
- Ea Jansen
- Peeter Järvelaid

== K ==
- Andres Kasekamp
- Johan Kõpp

== L ==
- Mart Laar
- Mati Laur
- Otto Liiv
- Tõnis Lukas

== M ==
- Linnart Mäll
- Friedrich Fromhold Martens
- Olaf Mertelsmann
- Harri Moora

== N ==
- Mart Nutt

== O ==
- Sulev Oll

== P ==
- Helmut Piirimäe

== R ==
- Tiit Rosenberg

== S ==
- Edgar Valter Saks
- Anti Selart
- Leonid Stolovich

== T ==
- Simmu Tiik

== V ==
- Lauri Vahtre
- Sulev Vahtre
- Heiki Valk
- Arthur Võõbus

== See also ==
- List of Estonian archaeologists
