= Tiik =

Family name

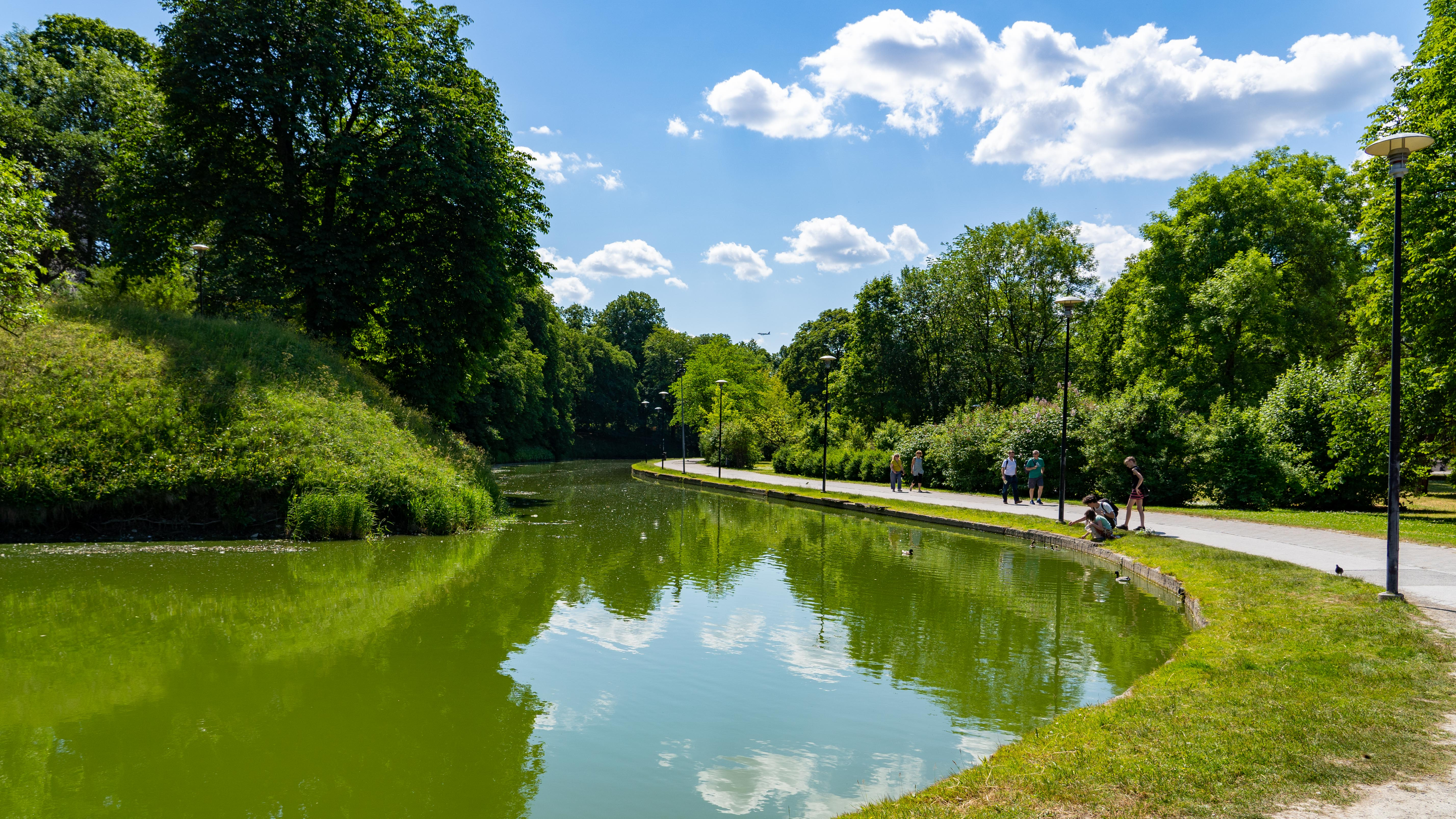
- Snelli Pond (Snelli tiik) in Tallinn Old Town

Origin
- Language: Estonian
- Meaning: pond
- Region of origin: Estonia

Tiik is an Estonian language surname meaning pond.

As of 1 January 2022, 125 men and 150 women in Estonia have the surname Tiik. Tiik is ranked the 596th most common surname for men in Estonia and 523rd for women. The surname Tiik is most common in Saare County, where 4.46 per 10,000 inhabitants of the county bear the surname.

Notable people bearing the surname Tiik include:

- Aksel Tiik (1921–2010), gymnastics teacher and sports historian
- Hans Tiik (1903–1941), judge
- Leo Tiik (1910–1996), economic geographer, librarian and historian
- Saima Tiik (born 1957), track and field athlete
- Simmu Tiik (born 1959), diplomat
- Sirly Tiik (born 1974), Paralympic track and field athlete
