= Andrei Novikov =

Estonian politician

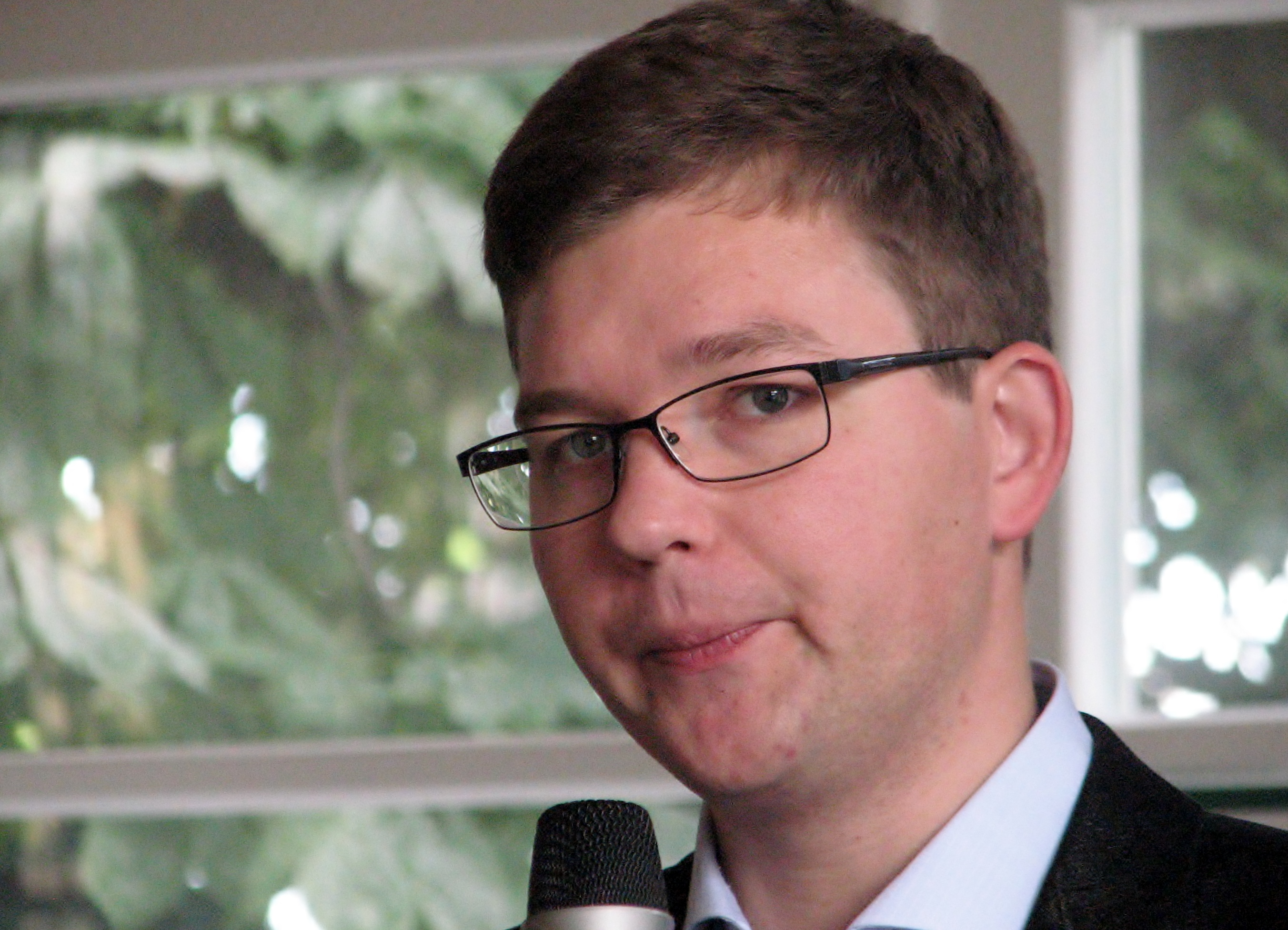
Andrei Novikov

Andrei Novikov (born 27 March 1982) is an Estonian politician. He was a member of the XIII Riigikogu and has been the Deputy Mayor of Tallinn since 9 November 2017.
