= Kotkas =

Family name

Kotkas is an Estonian surname meaning "eagle". Notable people with the surname include:

- Johannes Kotkas (1915–1998), Estonian wrestler
- Kalev Kotkas (born 1960), Estonian politician
- Kalevi Kotkas (1913–1983), Estonian-born Finnish athlete
