= Mart Helme =

Estonian historian and politician

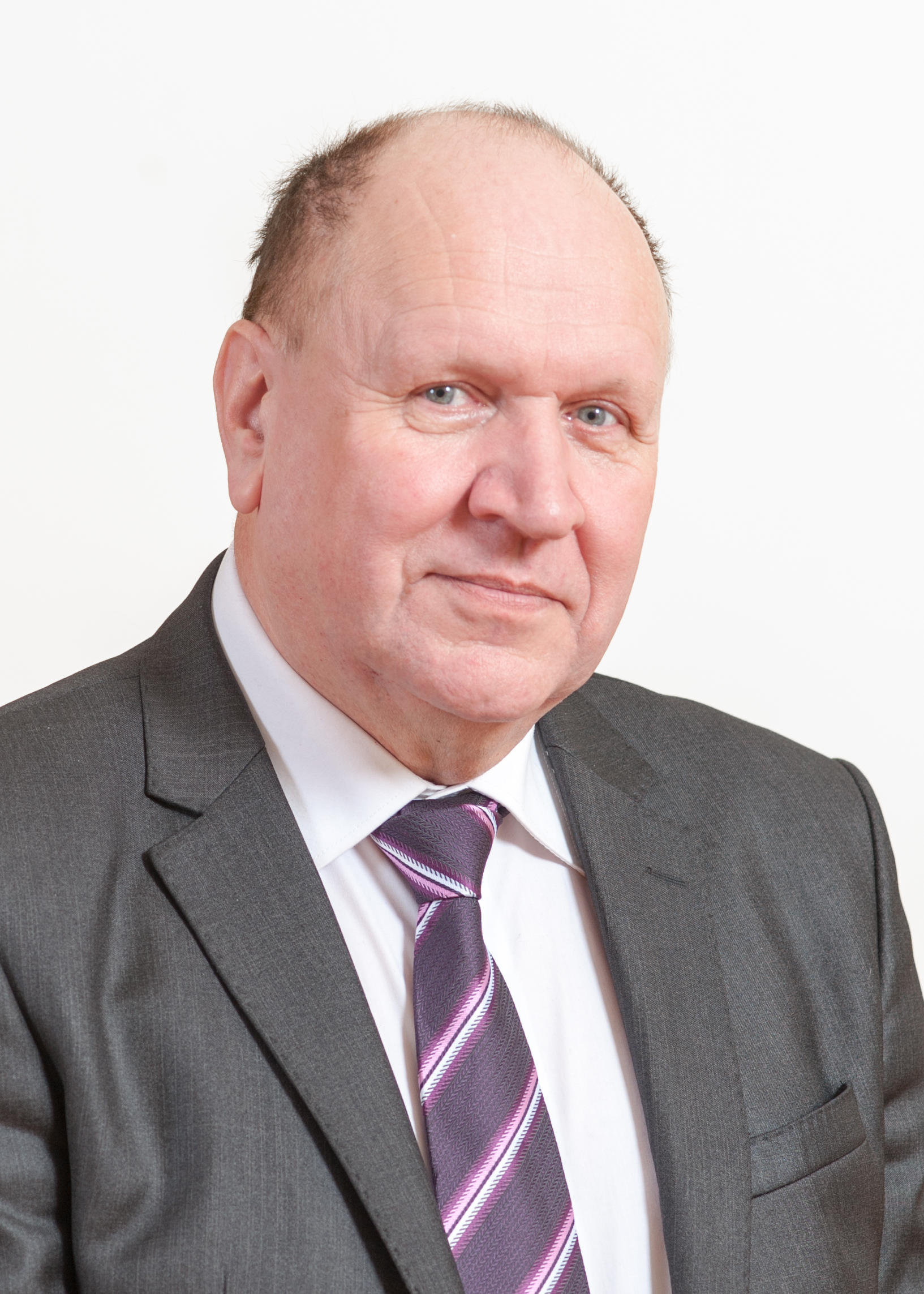

Minister of the Interior
- In office 29 April 2019 – 9 November 2020
- Prime Minister: Jüri Ratas
- Preceded by: Katri Raik
- Succeeded by: Alar Laneman

Leader of the Conservative People's Party
- In office 13 April 2013 – 4 July 2020
- Preceded by: Margo Miljand
- Succeeded by: Martin Helme

Estonian Ambassador to Russia
- In office 1995–1999
- President: Lennart Meri
- Preceded by: Jüri Kahn
- Succeeded by: Tiit Matsulevitš

Member of the Riigikogu
- Incumbent
- Assumed office 10 November 2020
- In office 30 March 2015 – 29 April 2019

Personal details
- Born: 31 October 1949 (age 77) Pärnu, then part of Estonian SSR, Soviet Union
- Party: Conservative People's Party (2012–present)
- Other political affiliations: Res Publica Party (2002); People's Union (2003–2005)
- Spouse(s): Sirje Helme (divorced} Helle-Moonika Helme
- Relations: Rein Helme (brother); Peeter Helme (nephew)
- Children: 6, including Martin Helme and Maarja Vaino
- Education: University of Tartu

Mart Helme ([ˈmɑrt ˈhelme], born 31 October 1949) is an Estonian politician, diplomat and historian who served as the Minister of the Interior from 2019 to 2020. He was the longtime chairman of the national conservative Conservative People's Party of Estonia (EKRE) from 13 April 2013 to 4 July 2020 when he was succeeded by his son Martin Helme.

Helme also served as Estonia's ambassador to Russia from 1995 to 1999. Some media outlets have described him as a right-wing populist.

== Early life ==
Mart Helme was born on 31 October 1949 in Pärnu. His younger brother was politician Rein Helme.

After graduating from high school in Pärnu in 1968, he studied history at the University of Tartu and graduated in 1973. He was the editor of the Estonian translation of "The Communist Manifesto" by Karl Marx published in 1974.

In his youth, Helme played in several bands, including Hübriid (which also featured future 2 Quick Start singer-songwriter Pearu Paulus).

== Political career ==
Helme joined the Estonian diplomatic service in 1994. In 1995, he was appointed as the Estonian ambassador to Russia by President Lennart Meri. His tenure lasted until 1999. While in Moscow, he took part in the border negotiations with Russia.

From 2003 to 2005, Helme was a member of the agrarian-centrist People's Union of Estonia. In 2012, when the party merged with the Estonian Patriotic Movement, Helme became a member of the new Conservative People's Party of Estonia. A year later, he was elected its leader.

He has said that "Estonian politicians should honestly admit that our choice is between staying with those who are creating a United States of Europe and joining those who desire a Europe of nation states. The Conservative People's Party doesn't see a place for Estonia in a United States of Europe."

In 2015 parliamentary election, Helme was elected to parliament with 6,714 individual votes and in the 2019 parliamentary election he increased his support to 9,170 individual votes.

In March 2019 Mart Helme said to the press that he wishes that one day his party would be the sole ruling party of Estonia.

After EKRE's receiving of 17.8% of the votes in the 2019 parliamentary election and the subsequent inclusion in the governing coalition, Helme was appointed to Jüri Ratas' second cabinet as Estonia's interior minister. On 2 May 2019, Helme was also named First Deputy Prime Minister.

On 9 November 2020 a no-confidence vote, filed by the opposition against Helme, was scheduled to take place in the Estonian parliament, due to Helme's comments in a radio show where he claimed that the 2020 US elections were forged and his comments about the president-elect Joe Biden. On the morning before the no-confidence vote was supposed to take place, Helme resigned, claiming he had not done anything inappropriate.

== Media controversy ==
Helme has made headlines in the media with some of his statements, such as: "The police are already overwhelmed with work. Why should they be safeguarding the parades of perverts?" (speaking about the LGBT pride parade); "The number of negroes in Tallinn has grown explosively ... If you knock them against the head, then it sounds like hollow wood"; "Now we can see that a sales girl has become prime minister and some other street activist and uneducated person has also become a member of the government" (speaking about Finnish prime minister Sanna Marin); and "[Gay people in Estonia] should run around in Sweden. Everyone is friendly towards them there ... I don't look at them friendly."

In December 2019, Helme said in a radio interview that a "sales assistant girl" had become Finland's prime minister and was now seeking "to liquidate Finland" – a reference to the election of Sanna Marin, who once worked as a cashier, as prime minister of Finland and the world's youngest serving head of government. This prompted an apology from Kersti Kaljulaid, Estonia's president to Finnish president Sauli Niinistö, who also asked that the apology be conveyed to Marin and the government.

On 27 February 2020, Helme stated at a government press conference that the common cold had been renamed as the coronavirus and that in his youth nothing like that existed. He recommended wearing warm socks and mustard patches as well as spreading goose fat on one's chest as treatments for the virus. Helme also said that the virus would pass within a few days to a week just like the common cold.

In an October 2020 interview with Deutsche Welle, while being in the role of the Interior Minister, Helme stated that the homosexual people in Estonia should rather go "run around in Sweden" and that he "doesn't view them friendly". This drew strong criticism in the media, the political spectrum and the President, who stated that someone with such opinions is unfit to serve as a government minister. The leaders of the other parties who formed a coalition with Helme stated that "his views should be ignored" and that "this is not what the coalition agreed on". The opposition in parliament demanded a resignation. The prime minister Jüri Ratas and his party later decided to keep Mart Helme in office.

On 13 April 2022, in widely condemned remarks made during a sitting only hours after Volodymyr Zelenskyy delivered a speech to the Riigikogu, Mart Helme claimed that HIV and other infectious diseases are going to return to Estonia, brought in by war refugees from Ukraine, many of whom may get involved in prostitution in Estonia. Condemnation was swift from politicians of several parties and also the former president, Toomas Hendrik Ilves who Tweeted that this is "how a right-wing extremist fishes for Russian votes." Contrary to Helme's claim that HIV is "going to return" to the country, increasingly stable but relatively high numbers of new cases of HIV are diagnosed in Estonia each year. According to the results of an epidemiological survey published last year, Estonia ranked third in the EU for number of new HIV cases in 2019, behind just Malta and Latvia.

== Personal life ==
Helme's current wife, Helle-Moonika Helme, is an MP in the Riigikogu for EKRE. Mart Helme has a son, Martin Helme, now leader of EKRE, and a daughter, literary scholar Maarja Vaino, both from a previous marriage to art historian and critic Sirje Helme. He owns the Suure-Lähtru manor. He has worked as a journalist, publisher and diplomat. He has also been a farmer and a singer.

Party political offices
Preceded by Margo Miljand	Leader of the Conservative People's Party of Estonia; 2013–2020	Succeeded by Martin Helme
Diplomatic posts
Preceded by Jüri Kahn	Estonian Ambassador to Russia; 1995–1999	Succeeded by Tiit Matsulevitš
Political offices
Preceded by Katri Raik	Minister of the Interior; 2019–2020	Succeeded by Alar Laneman
