= List of ambassadors of Estonia to Russia =

Estonia has an embassy in Moscow as well as a consulate-general in Saint Petersburg and another consulate mission in Pskov. The following is a list of ambassadors of Estonia to Russia.

== Envoys to the Soviet Union ==
- 1921–1922: Tõnis Vares
- 1922–1926: Ado Birk
- 1926–1928: Heinrich Laretei
- 1928–1933: Julius Seljamaa
- 1933–1936: Karl Tofer
- 1936–1937: August Traksmaa
- 1938–1940: August Rei

== Ambassadors to the Russian Federation ==
- 1992–1995: Jüri Kahn
- 1995–1999: Mart Helme
- 1999–2001: Tiit Matsulevitš
- 2001–2005: Karin Jaani
- 2005–2008: Marina Kaljurand
- 2008–2012: Simmu Tiik
- 2012–2015: Jüri Luik
- 2015–2018: Arti Hilpus
- 2018–2023: Margus Laidre
