= Margus Laidre =

Estonian historian and diplomat

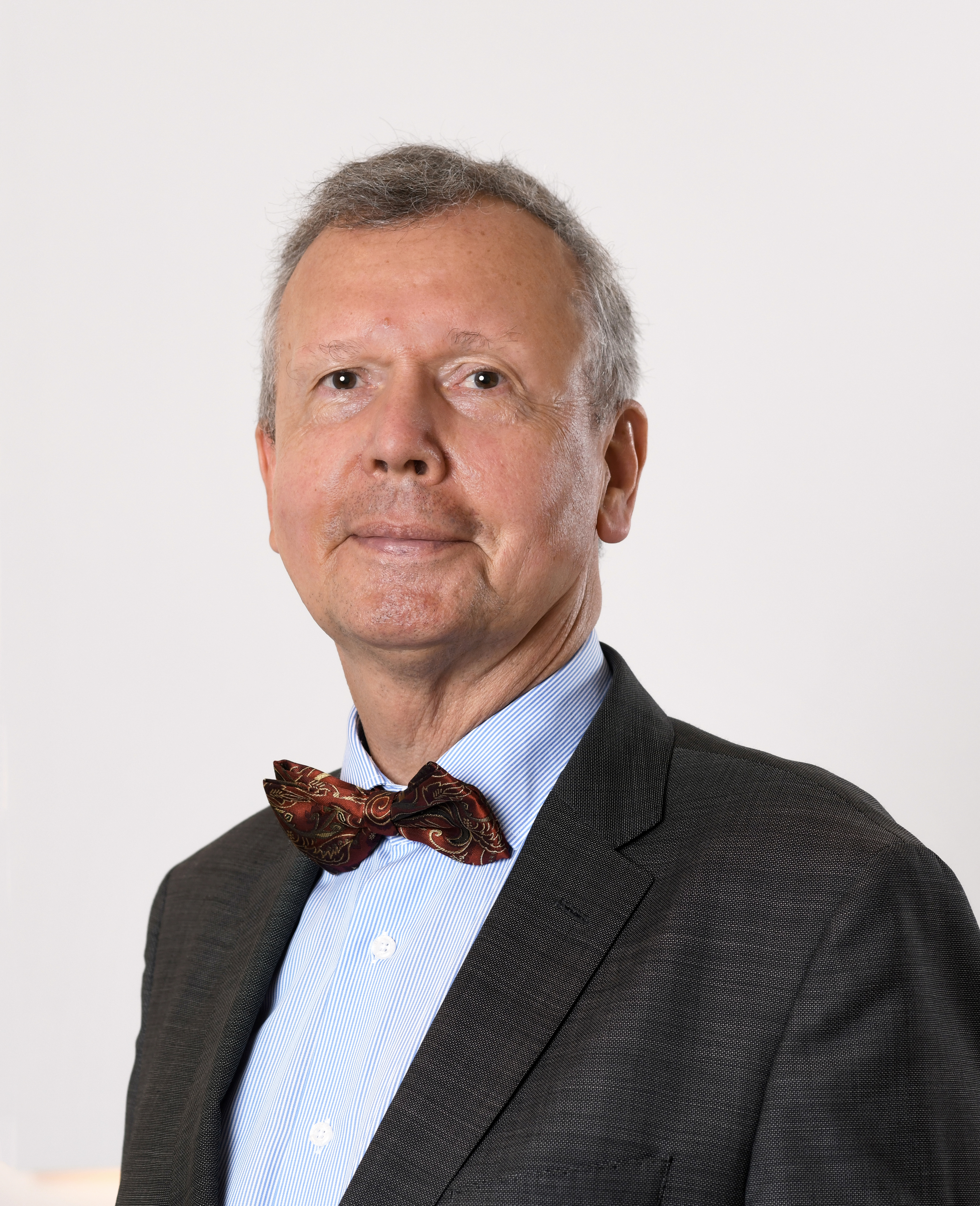
- Laidre in 2022

Ambassador of Estonia to Russia
- In office 11 October 2018 – 7 February 2023
- Preceded by: Arti Hilpus

Ambassador of Estonia to Finland
- In office 2014 – 11 October 2018
- Preceded by: Mart Tarmak
- Succeeded by: Harri Tiido

Foreign Adviser to the President
- In office 8 August 2010 – 2014
- Preceded by: Sven Jürgenson

Ambassador of Estonia to the United Kingdom
- In office 2005 – 8 August 2010

Ambassador of Estonia to the Holy See
- In office 1997–2000

Ambassador of Estonia to Germany
- In office 1996–1997

Ambassador of Estonia to Sweden
- In office 1991–1996

Personal details
- Born: 18 September 1959 Tartu, then part of Estonian SSR, Soviet Union

Margus Laidre (born 18 September 1959) is an Estonian historian and diplomat.

In 1982, Laidre graduated from Tartu University's Department of History.

Diplomatic posts:

- 1991 Ambassador to Sweden
- 1996 Ambassador to Germany
- 1997 Ambassador to the Holy See (from Bonn/Berlin)
- 2006 Ambassador to the United Kingdom
- 2014 Ambassador to Finland
- 2018–2023 Ambassador to Russian Federation
