= Karin Aasma =

Swedish historian

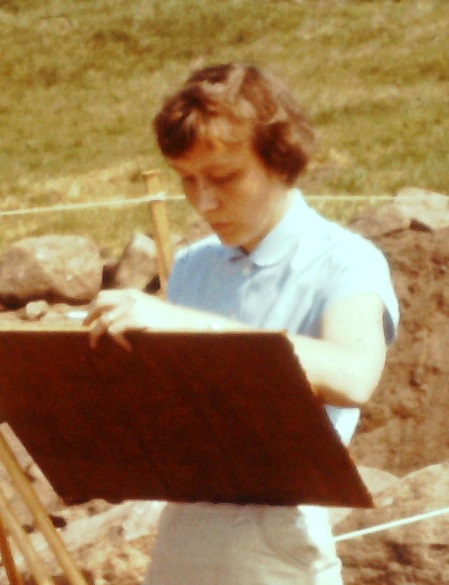
- Aasma in 1960
- Born: Helju Karin Isaac; 17 March 1926; Pärnu, Estonia
- Died: 12 January 2012 (aged 85); Gothenburg, Sweden
- Education: University of Gothenburg; Stockholm University
- Spouse: Felix Aasma
- Children: 3

Karin Aasma (born Helju Karin Isak; 17 March 1926 – 29 January 2012) was an Estonian-Swedish art historian.

Her father was an architect and her mother was an art teacher. In 1944 she graduated from Higher Girls' School of Pärnu. The same year she fled to Sweden where she continued to study at the Society of Crafts and Design (now HDK) in Gothenburg 1946-1948. Aasma later studied classical archeology, ethnography and art history at both the University of Gothenburg and Stockholm University. In 1960, she earned a filosofie licentiat degree in art history at the University of Gothenburg, with a licentiate thesis on the interior decoration of churches in western Sweden during the 1600s and 1700s.

1964-1966 Aasma worked as a curator at the Historical Museum of Gothenburg. She worked as a museum educator at the Gothenburg Museum of Art 1966-1976, taught art history at the University of Gothenburg 1976-1990, and was a curator at the Röhsska Museum 1976-91.

Aasma was a member of the International Council of Museums (ICOM). She was also a member of the Swedish Association of Museum Employees (Svenska Museimannaföreningen), and from 1951 of the Estonian Student Association Filiae Patriae.

She was editor and co-author of the collection work "Allmogekulturen i Estland" ("Folk Culture in Estonia) (Nordic Museum, 1980). In the book "Ösels kyrkor", she gave an overview of the medieval churches of Saaremaa. Aasma also held lectures on Estonian art, including the history of architecture. Likewise, she participated in the writing of reprints of the churches of Bohuslän in the "Swedish Churches" book series published by the Swedish National Heritage Board and the Royal Swedish Academy of Letters, History and Antiquities.

2005, she received a prize from Eesti Komitee in Stockholm for her work on Estonian culture.

Karin Aasma was married to Felix Aasma, an associate professor in electrical engineering. They had a son and two daughters.

== Works ==
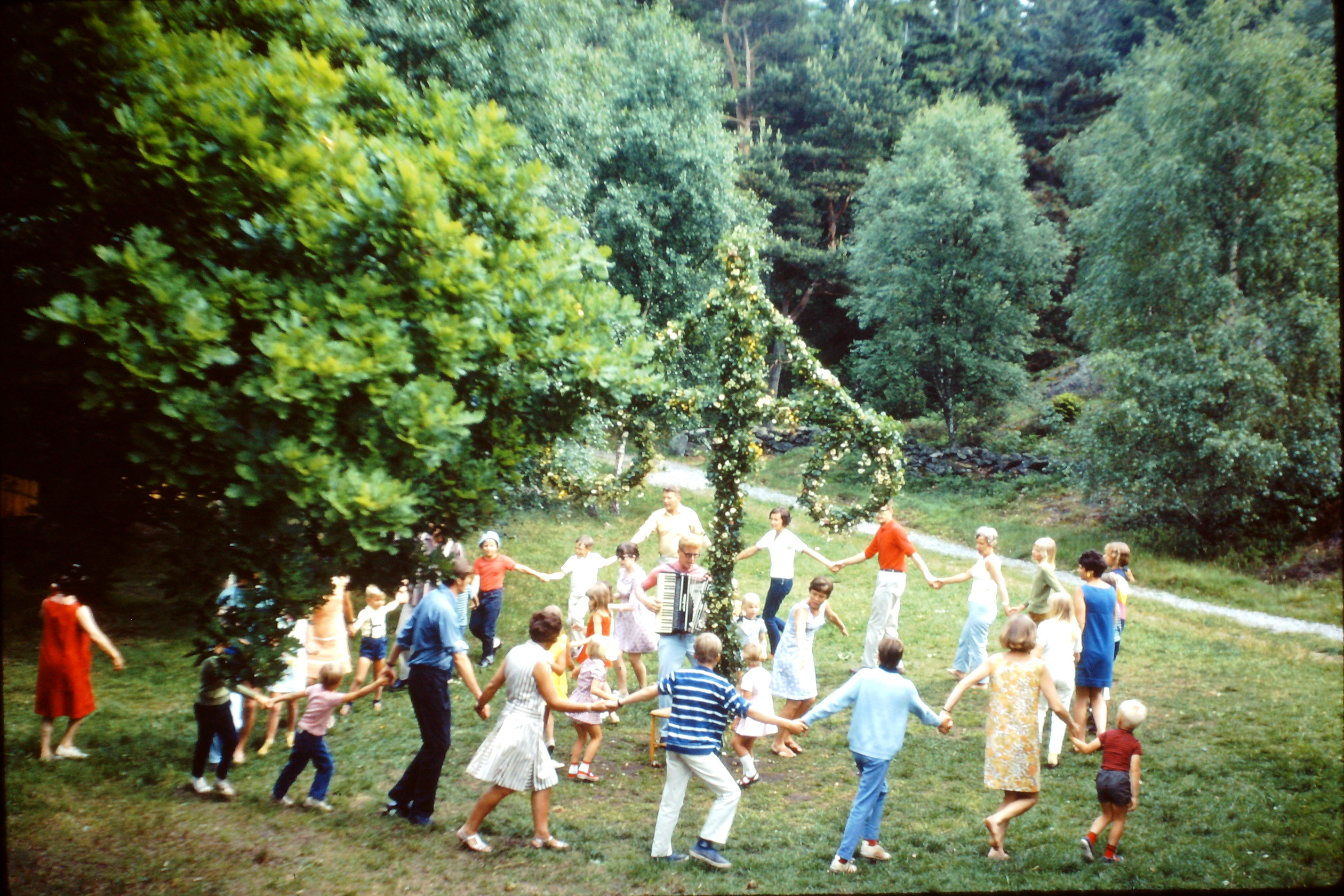
Photo taken by Karin Aasma, at the Midsummer celebrations at Årsnäs near Kode, where she had a summer house from 1964.

- "Korp! Filiae Patriae Göteborgi koondis: lõunakokkutulekud" kogumikus "Korporatsioon Filiae Patriae 90" Tartu, 2010, lk 82
- "Eesti ehtekunsti näitus Göteborgis" Eesti Päevaleht (Stockholm), 31. oktoober 2002, nr 43, lk 10 (26. oktoobrist 20. novembrini 2002 toimus Kadri Mälgu ehtenäitus)
- "Eesti Kunstivarad hävinemas ?" Eesti Päevaleht (Stockholm), 21. oktoober 1999, nr 41, lk 5 (Marika Valk esines 28. septembril 1999 Stockholmi Eesti Majas ettekande ja videofilmi näitamisega uue Eesti Kunstimuuseumi hoone projektist)
- "Estival '03 - tagasivaade" Eesti Päevaleht (Stockholm), 19. juuni 2003, nr 24, lk 8 (kokkuvõte 2003. aasta Eesti Kultuuripäevadest Göteborgis)
- "Dragsmarks och Bokenäs kyrkor: Lane härad, Bohuslän" Stockholm : Almqvist & Wiksell International, 1994
- "I österled - tema Baltikum: vandringsutställningen" Göteborg: Göteborgs Museer, 1983
- "Kungälvs kyrkor: Inlands Södre härad, Bohuslän" Stockholm: Almqvist & Wiksell, 1969
- "Kyrkorna i Marstrand: Bohuslän" Stockholm: Almqvist & Wiksell, 1974
- "Medeltida kyrkor på Ösel, Estland : anteckningar från en resa till Ösel sommaren 1989" Göteborg, 1989
- "Medeltida kyrkor på Ösel, Estland : anteckningar från en resa till Ösel sommaren 1989 (med tillägg 1993)" Göteborg, 1993
- Karin Aasma, Ursula Larsson, Maj-Brit Wadell "Ytterby, Kareby och Romelanda kyrkor i Bohuslän: samt tillägg, rättelser och register till Bohuslän" Bd. 1. Stockholm: Generalstabens litografiska anstalts förlag, 1967, lk 270-436

== See also ==
- List of Estonian historians
