= Enn Eesmaa =

Estonian politician

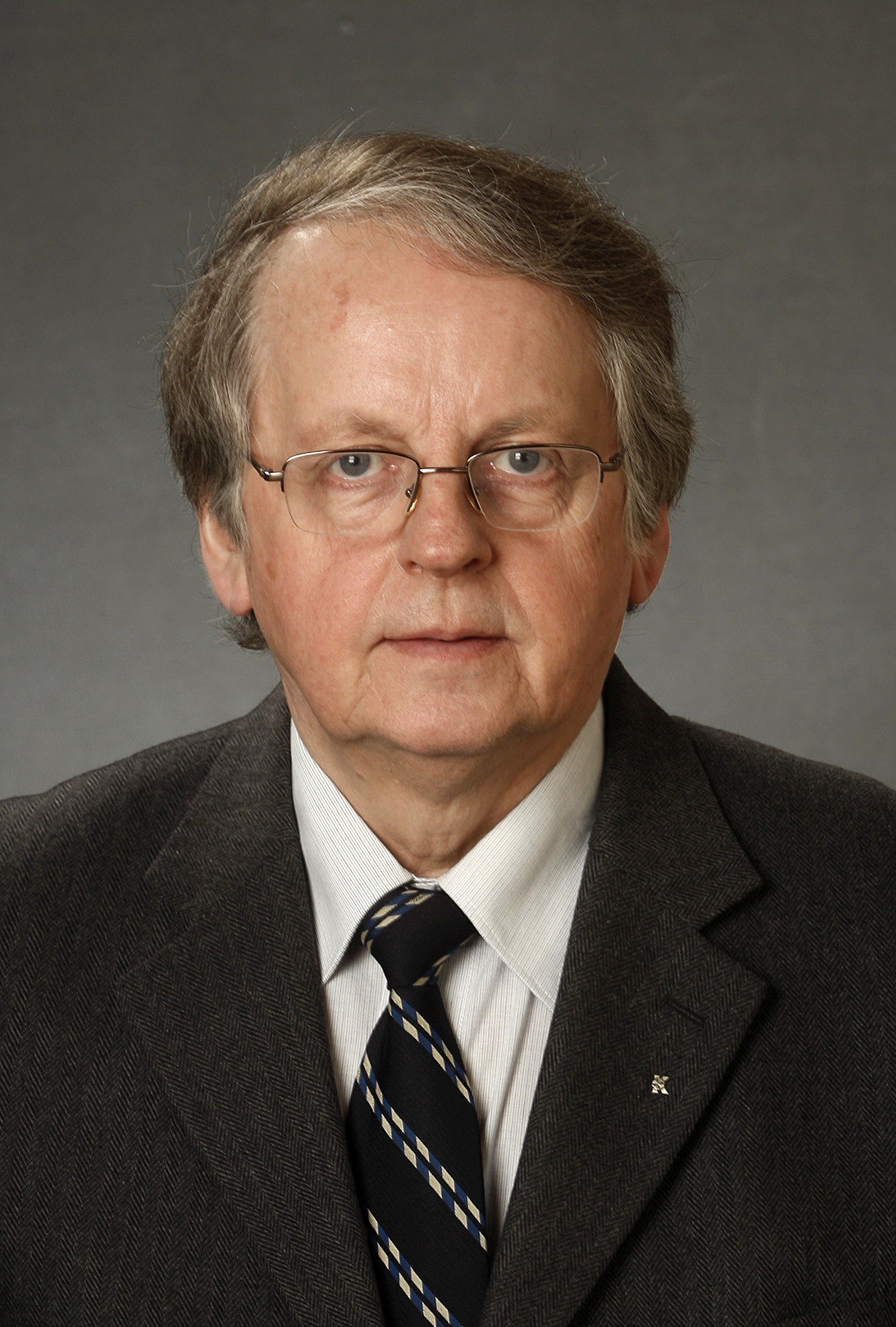

Member of XIV Riigikogu

Director of EVTV
- In office 1994–1996

Personal details
- Born: June 7, 1946 (age 80) Tallinn, then part of Estonian SSR, Soviet Union
- Party: Estonian Centre Party
- Occupation: Politician

Enn Eesmaa (born 7 June 1946 in Tallinn) is an Estonian politician and former journalist. He is a member of XIV Riigikogu. Since 2003 he has belonged to the Estonian Centre Party.

From 1994-1996 he was director of EVTV, and from 1996-2003 he worked for TV3.

He has served as a member of the X, XI, XII, XIII Riigikogu and XIV Riigikogu.
