= Lauri Luik =

Estonian politician (born 1982)

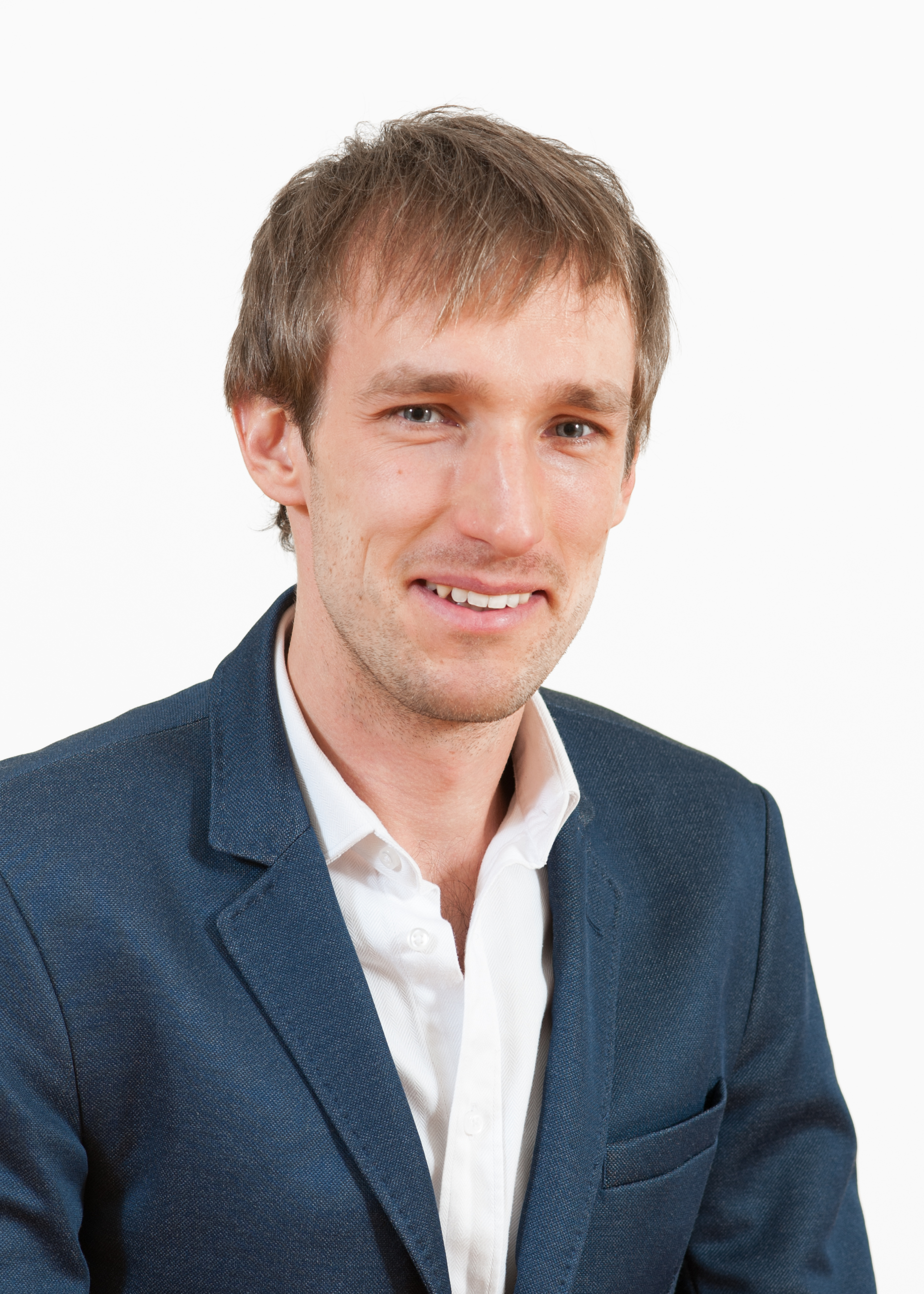
- Luik in 2015

Personal details
- Born: 23 April 1982 (age 44) Haapsalu, Estonia
- Party: Estonian Reform Party
- Education: Tallinn University of Technology

Lauri Luik (born 23 April 1982) is an Estonian politician. He was a member of the 11th, 12th and 13th Riigikogu.

In 2004 he graduated from Tallinn University of Technology with a degree in computer and systems engineering.

Since 2000 he has been a member of the Estonian Reform Party.
