= Neeme Suur =

Estonian politician (born 1969)

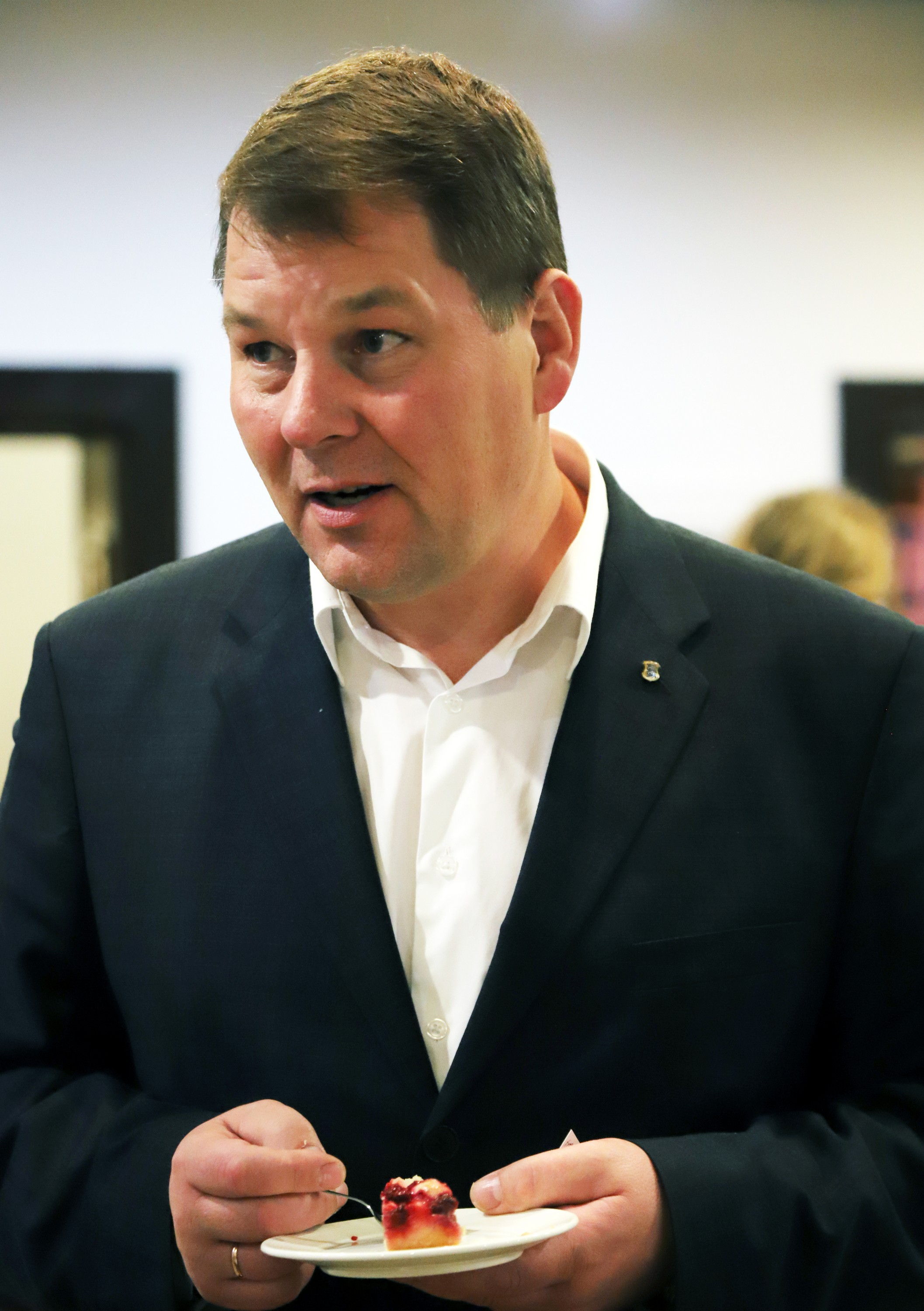
Neeme Suur in 2023

Neeme Suur (born 2 September 1968 in Haapsalu) is an Estonian politician. He was a member of the XII and XIII Riigikogu. He served as governor of Lääne County from 2008 until 2011 and 2015, and again from 2015 until 2017. He also served as the mayor of Risti.

He is a member of the Estonian Social Democratic Party.
