= Suure-Lähtru =

Village in Estonia

Coordinates: 58°53′N 23°50′E

Suure-Lähtru, Estonia
- Village
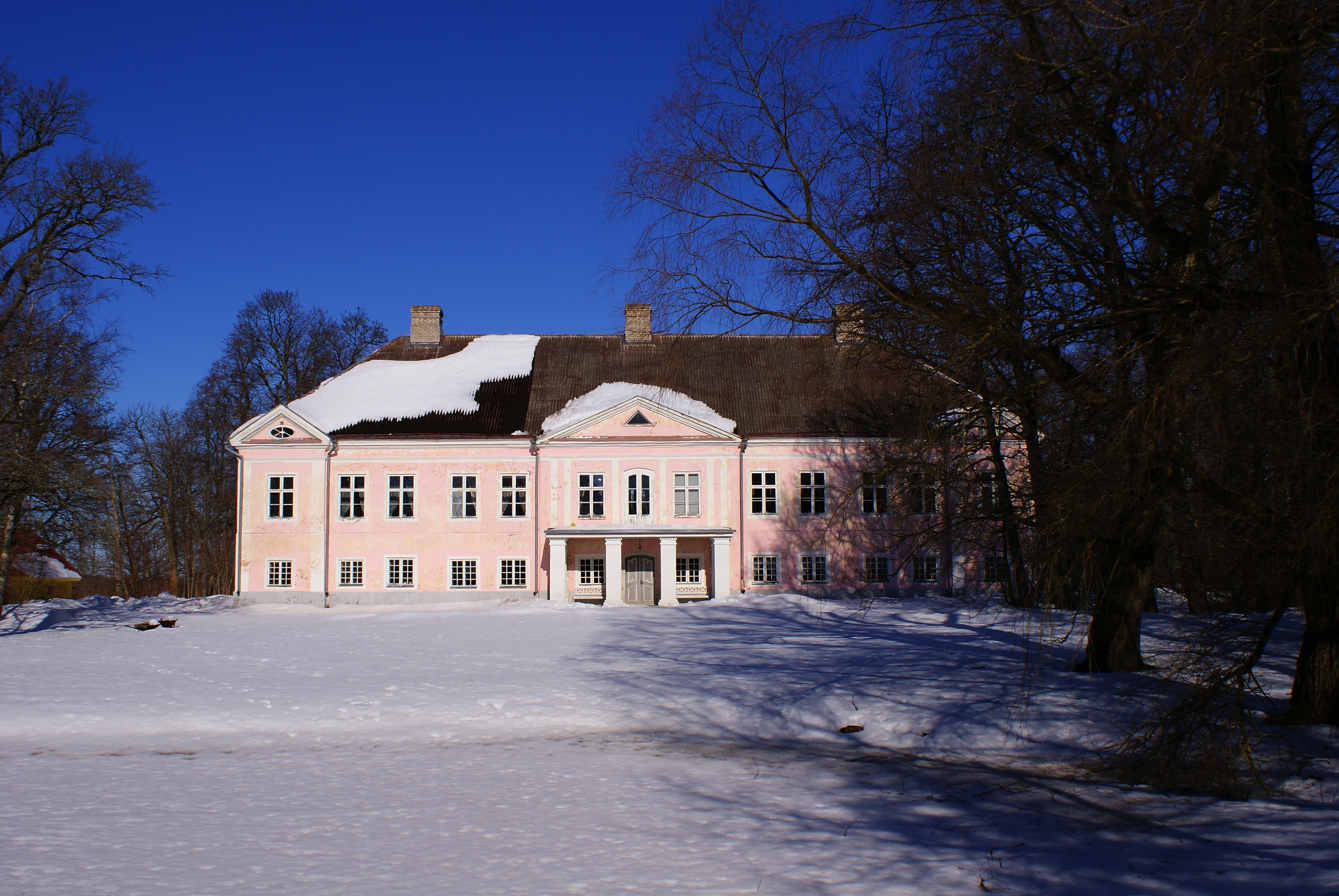
- Suure-Lähtru Manor
- Interactive map of Suure-Lähtru, Estonia
- Country: Estonia
- County: Lääne
- Parish: Lääne-Nigula
- Time zone: UTC+2 (EET)
  - Summer (DST): UTC+3 (EEST)

Suure-Lähtru (German: Groß-Lechtigall) is a village in Lääne-Nigula Parish, Lääne County, in western Estonia.

== Suure-Lähtru manor ==
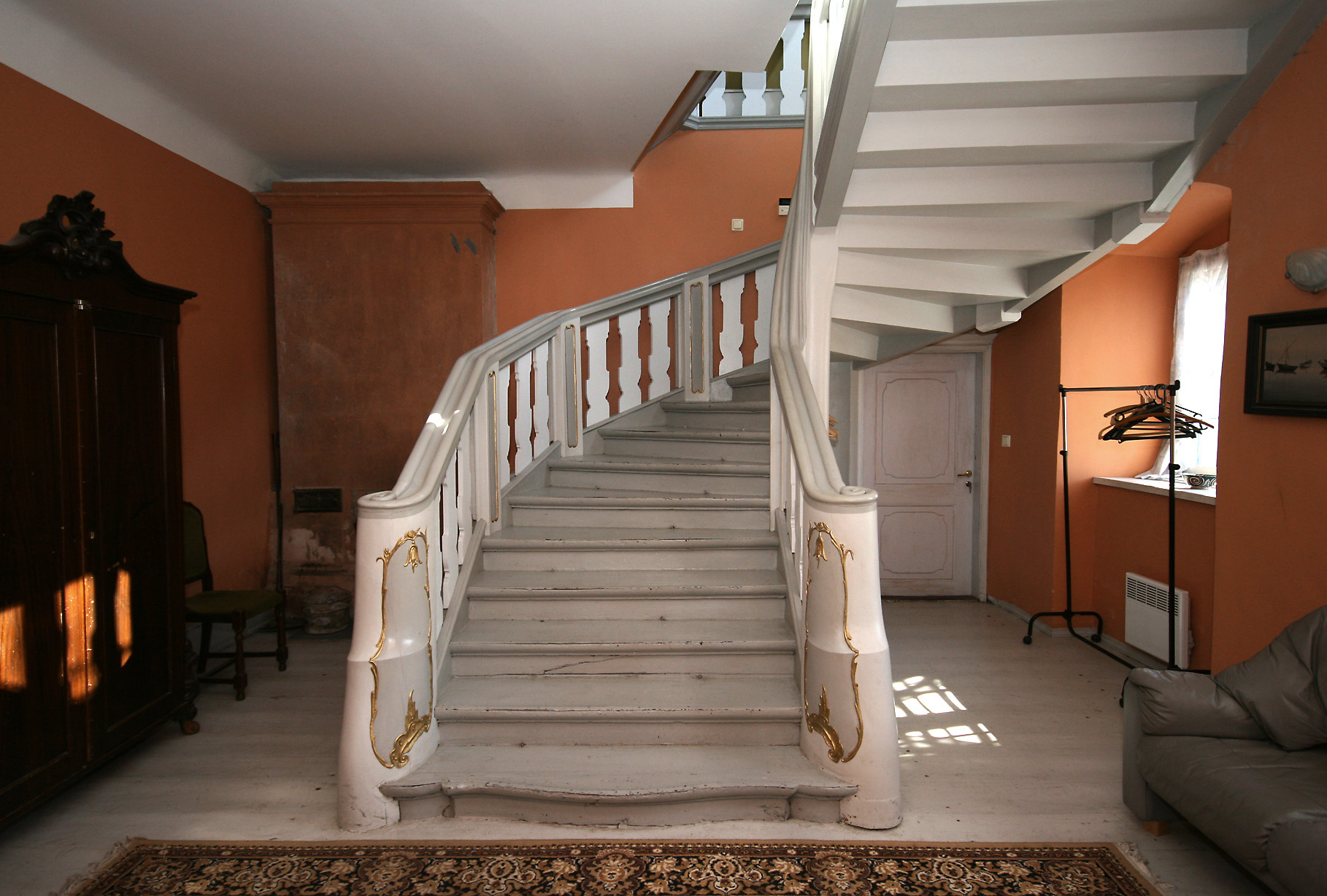
Carved wooden rococo stairs in the manor

The history of the estate goes back to the end of the 16th century. During the centuries, it has belonged to several different aristocratic families. During much of the 20th century, the manor was used as a school house. The current building was completed in 1778, and was designed by Johann Andreas Jaenichen, while most of the stucco work was done by Johann Caspar Mohr, who was province architect of Estonia and who also designed the Stenbock House (the current seat of the Government of Estonia) in Tallinn. A fine rococo stair is still preserved in the house.

== Notable people ==
- Mart Helme (born 1949), politician, has owned the manor building since 1996 and is currently residing there.

== See also ==
- List of palaces and manor houses in Estonia
