= Imre Sooäär =

Estonian politician (1969–2025)

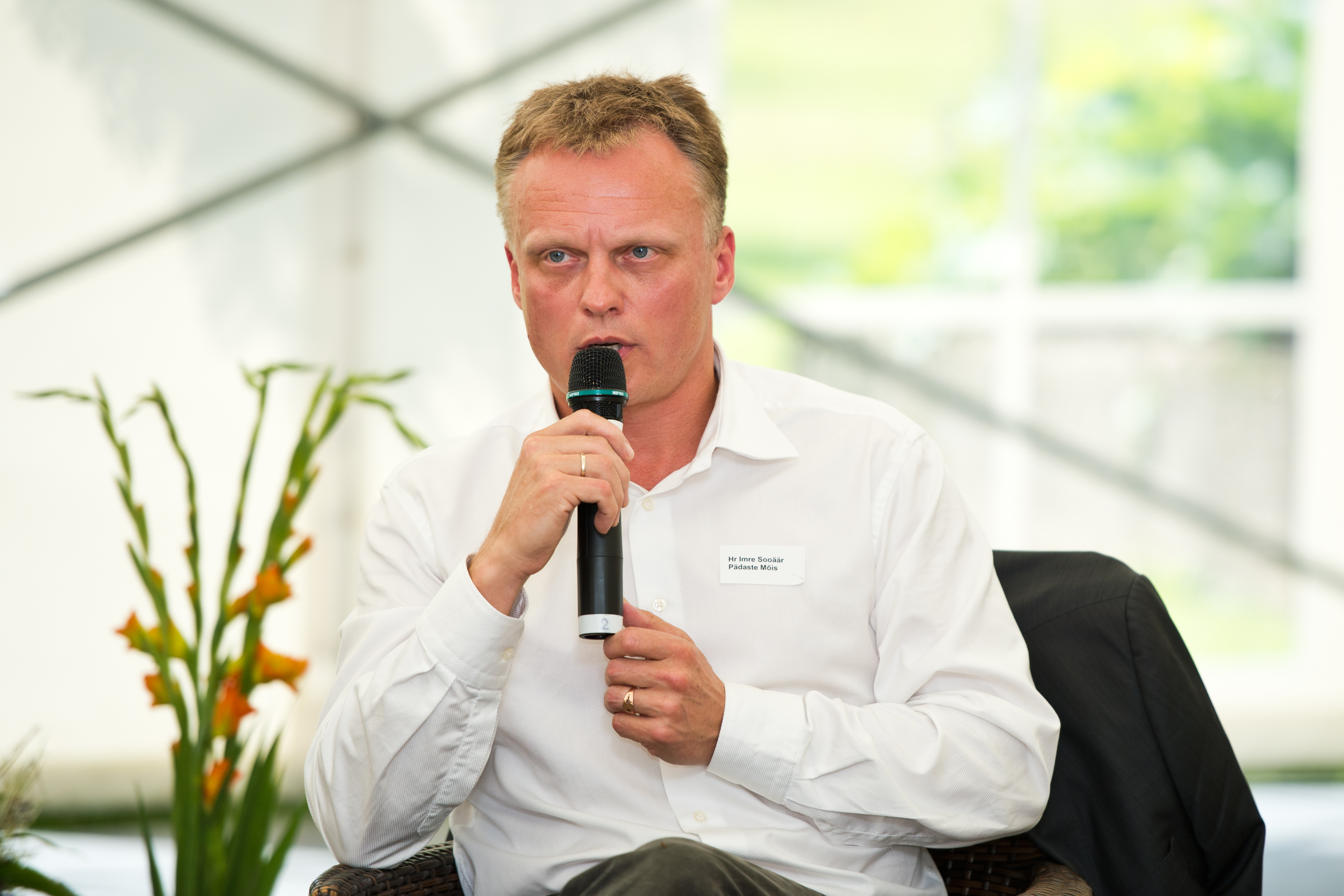
Sooäär in 2012

Imre Sooäär (13 March 1969 – 11 November 2025) was an Estonian businessman and politician. He was a member of the X, XI, XII, XIII and XIV Riigikogu.

Sooäär was a member of the Res Publica Party, and subsequently the Estonian Reform Party. He died in November 2025, at the age of 56.
