= Helle-Moonika Helme =

Estonian musician and politician, born 1966

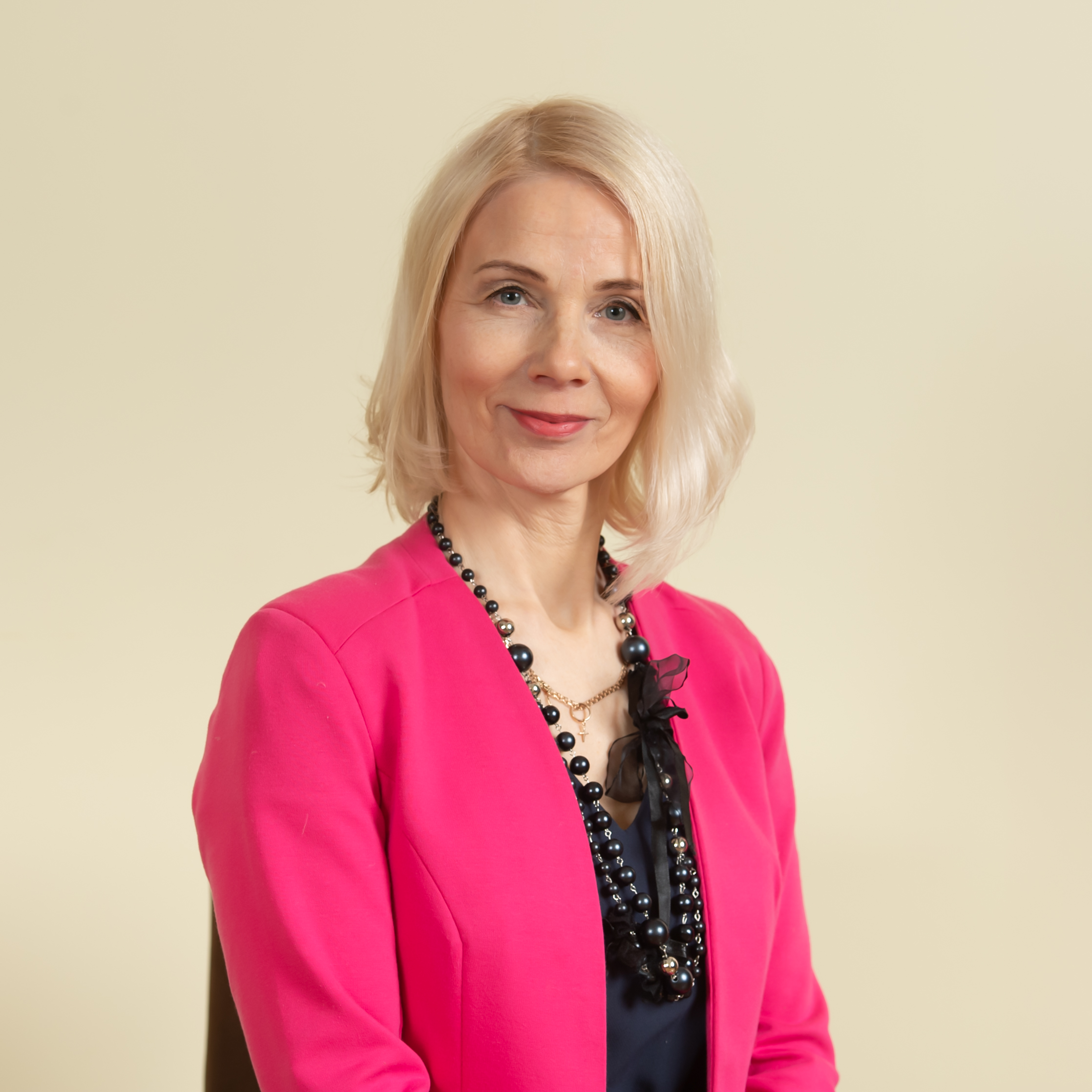

Member of the Riigikogu
- Incumbent
- Assumed office 10 April 2023

Personal details
- Born: Helle-Moonika Rauba; July 8, 1966 (age 60) Vastseliina, then part of Estonian SSR, Soviet Union
- Party: Conservative People's Party of Estonia (2012–present)
- Spouse: Mart Helme
- Children: 2
- Education: Estonian Academy of Music and Theatre
- Occupation: Politician, musician

Helle-Moonika Helme (née Rauba, formerly Toming; on 8 July 1966) is an Estonian musician and politician. She has been member of XIV Riigikogu and XV Riigikogu.

In 1997 she graduated from Estonian Academy of Music and Theatre in opera singing.

Since 2017 she is a member of Tallinn City Council.

Since 2012 she is a member of Estonian Conservative People's Party. She is married to Conservative People's Party of Estonia politician Mart Helme.

Helle-Moonika Helme was elected as a member of the XIV Riigikogu in the 2019 parliamentary elections. She served as a member of the Riigikogu's Culture Committee.

In the 2023 elections, she ran for the XV Riigikogu again and received 3,529 votes in the electoral district number 5 (Hiiu, Lääne, and Saare County) and was elected as a member of the Riigikogu once more.
