= Anti Liiv =

Estonian psychologist (1946–2025)

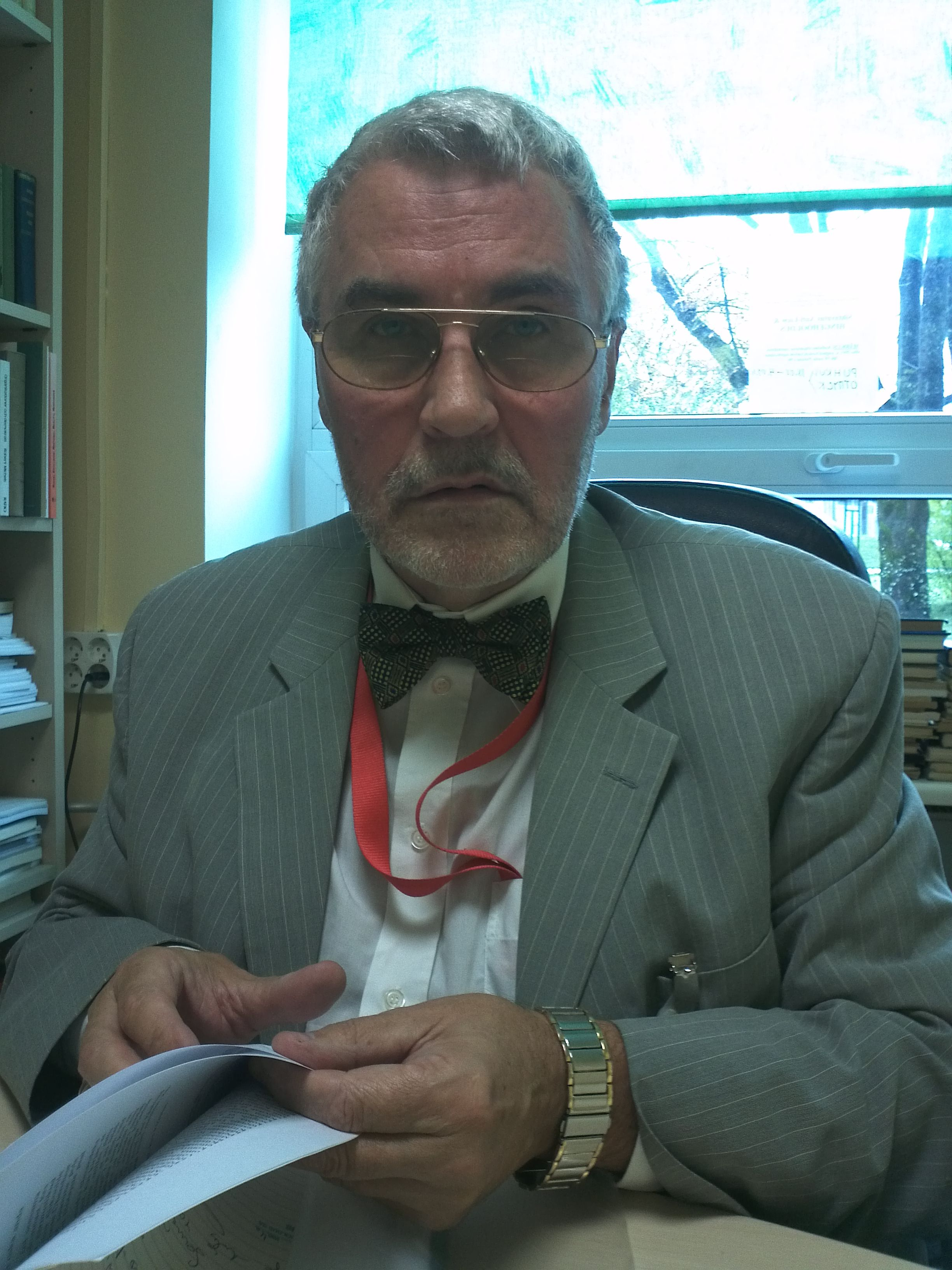
Anti Liiv in 2011

Anti Liiv (16 March 1946 – 20 November 2025) was an Estonian psychiatrist, psychologist and politician. He was a member of VIII and IX Riigikogu, representing the Estonian Centre Party.

Liiv was born in Kuressaare on 16 March 1946, and died on 20 November 2025, at the age of 79.
