= Otto Liiv =

Estonian historian and archivist

Otto Liiv (6 September [O.S. 24 August] 1905, in Narva – 10 December 1942, in Tartu) was an Estonian historian and archivist. He was one of the founders of Estonian archival science as well as one of the most prolific and respected historians in Estonia.

Liiv attended school in Narva and Tallinn and enrolled at the University of Tartu in 1923 and graduated in 1927. He was the head of the Estonian State Central Archives from 1929 to 1942. He also lectured at the University of Tartu and was the chief editor of the journal "Ajalooline Ajakiri". Liiv had an academic interest in the history of the 17th century Estonia and contributed to the books "The Economic History of Estonia" in 1937 and the third volume of "History of Estonia" in 1940.

In 2005, Eesti Post issued a commemorative Stamp cancellation marking the 100th anniversary of Otto Liiv's birth.
