= Ain Seppik =

Estonian politician

Ain Seppik (born 12 March 1952 in Tallinn) is an Estonian politician. He has been a member of the X and XI Riigikogu representing the Estonian Centre Party. 2002-2003 he was Minister of the Interior.
