= Rein Helme =

Estonian politician

- Born: 21 February 1954; Pärnu, then part of Estonian SSR, Soviet Union
- Died: 31 December 2003 (aged 49)
- Education: University of Tartu (PhD)
- Occupations: Historian, politician
- Relatives: Mart Helme (brother); Martin Helme (nephew)

Rein Helme (21 February 1954 – 31 December 2003) was an Estonian military historian and politician. He was born in Pärnu. He graduated from the Faculty of History of the University of Tartu in 1977 and defended his PhD thesis "The Baltic Theater of Military Operations of the Patriotic War of 1812" in 1987. The supervisor was Professor Helmut Piirimäe, and the opponents were Professor Sulev Vahtre from Tartu and Heinrihs Strods from the University of Latvia.

Rein Helme was a member of 7th Riigikogu. His older brother is politician Mart Helme and his nephew is politician Martin Helme, who both represent the Conservative People's Party of Estonia.
