= Kalev Kotkas =

Estonian politician (born 1960)

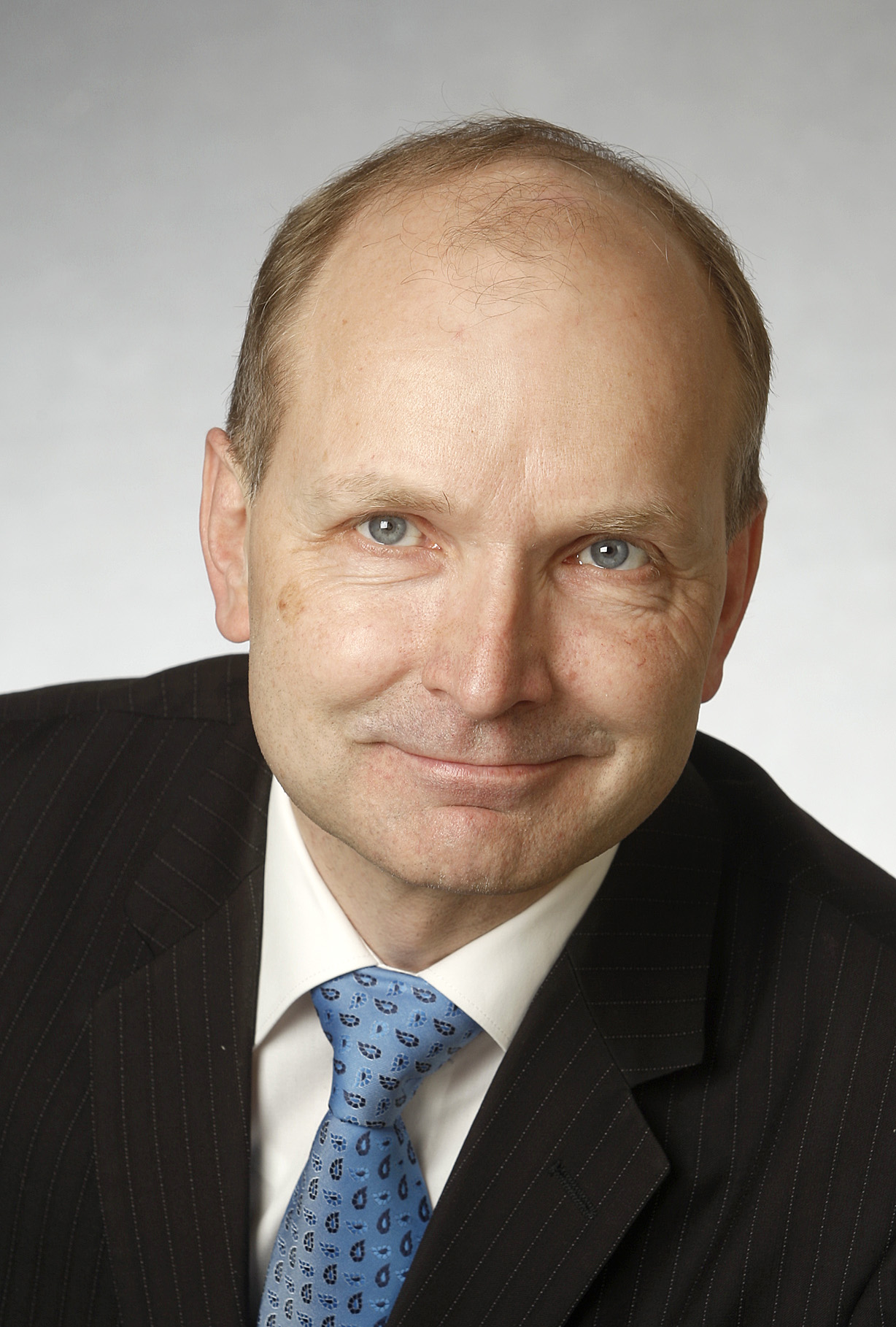
Kalev Kotkas

Kalev Kotkas (born 10 April 1960 in Tallinn) is an Estonian politician. He was a member of the IX, XI, XII and XIII Riigikogu.

In 1983 he graduated from Tallinn University of Technology with a degree in mechanical engineering and machine tools.

From 1996 to 1999 and 2005 to 2007 he was the mayor of Emmaste Rural Municipality.

Since 2007 he has been a member of Estonian Social Democratic Party.
