= Snelli Pond =

Pond in Tallinn, Estonia

- Snelli tiik (Estonian)
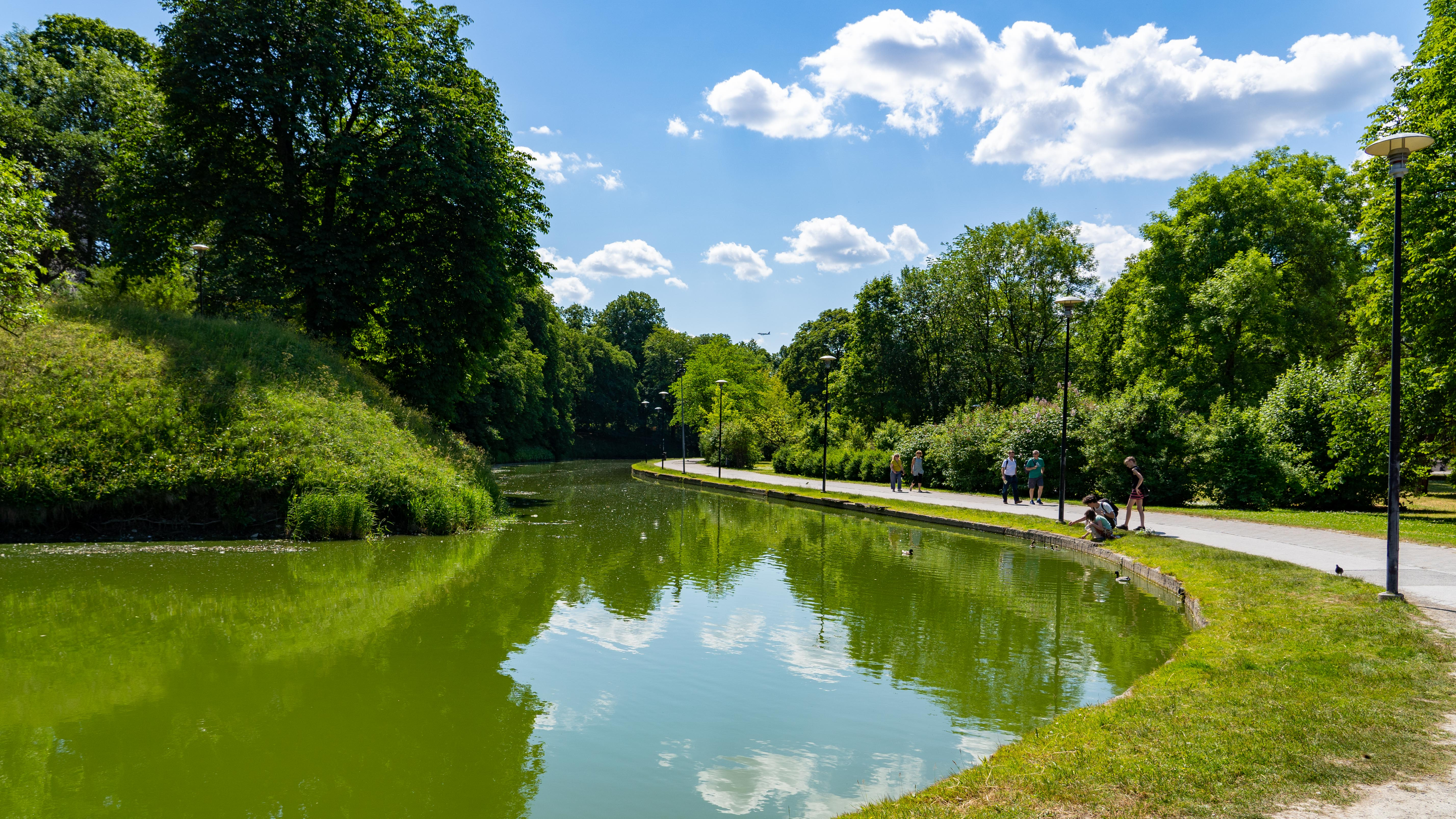

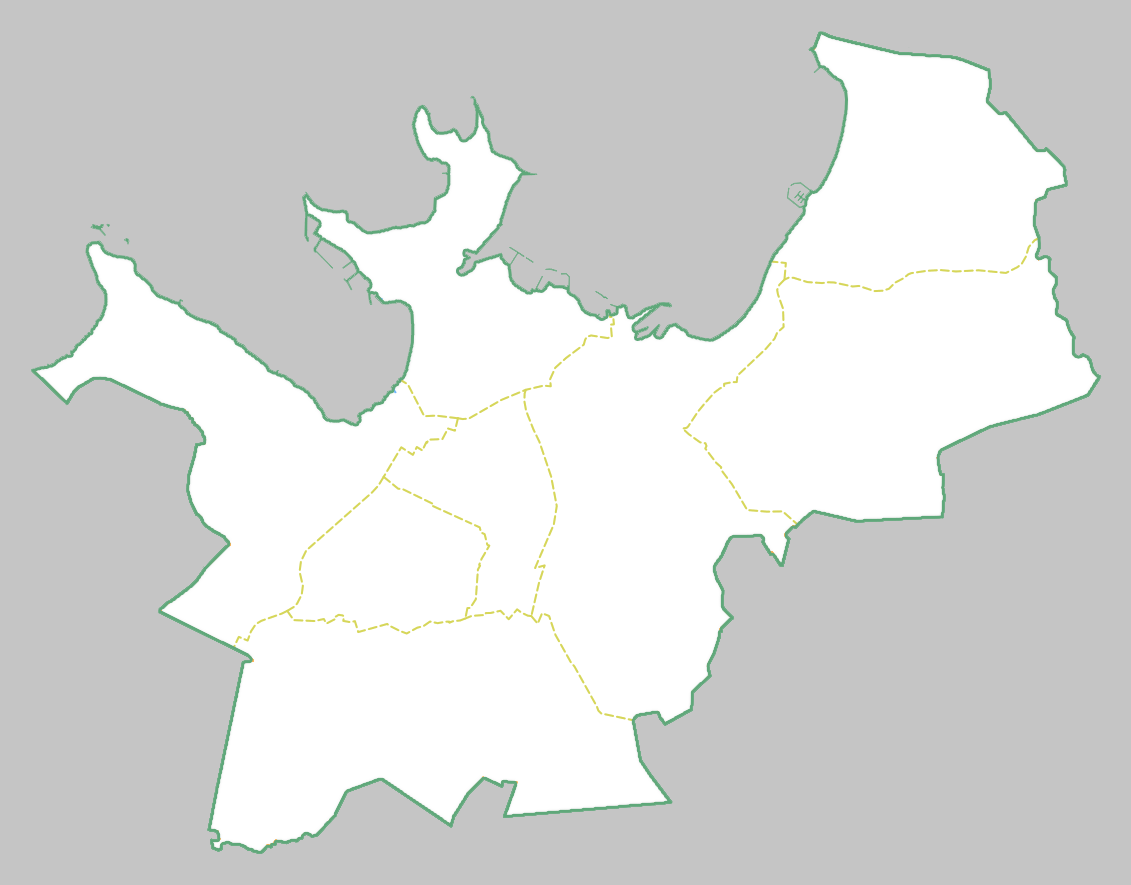
- Location within Tallinn
- Location: Harju County
- Coordinates: 59°26′16″N 24°44′09″E
- Basin countries: Estonia
- Max. length: 410 meters (1,350 ft)
- Surface area: 1.0 hectare (2.5 acres)
- Shore length^{1}: 1,030 meters (3,380 ft)
- Surface elevation: 14.5 meters (48 ft)
- ^{1} Shore length is not a well-defined measure.

Snelli Pond (Estonian: Snelli tiik), also Šnelli Pond (Estonian: Šnelli tiik), is an artificial pond in the Estonian capital Tallinn formed from the defensive structure (moat) of Toompea Castle.

Snelli Pond is located in Toompark in the Vanalinn subdistrict of the Tallinn Old Town area of Tallinn's city centre, between Toompea Heights, Falgi Road, Toompuiestee and Nunne Street. In the 1960s there was a slipway on the Nunne Street side of Snelli Pond, where the wooden building at the end of the pond was used as a changing room.

On 15 September 2007, the charity campaign "AWARE 2007" took place, which included the event "Clean Snelli Pond!". The pond has an area of 1 ha and a circumference of 1030 m.

== History ==
The pond was formed by the moat surrounding Toompea Fortress, which was redesigned in the 19th century after the loss of the military importance of Tallinn Fortress as part of the parks and green spaces surrounding Tallinn Old Town.

The pond is named after Johan Schnell, who had a house between the present Toompuiestee and the pond in the 19th century. It was originally called the Patkul Ditch because of the Patkul Redoubt on its banks. The redoubt was named after Dietrich Patkul, the last deputy governor of Sweden, but when Schnell bought the land in 1868 and built his house and garden there, the Patkul ditch was called Schnell pond. Johann Schnell ran a gardening business on Vaksali puiestee until his death on 4 June 1890. The Schnells owned the land until 1904.

== See also ==
- List of lakes of Estonia
