= Olaf Mertelsmann =

German historian (born 1969)

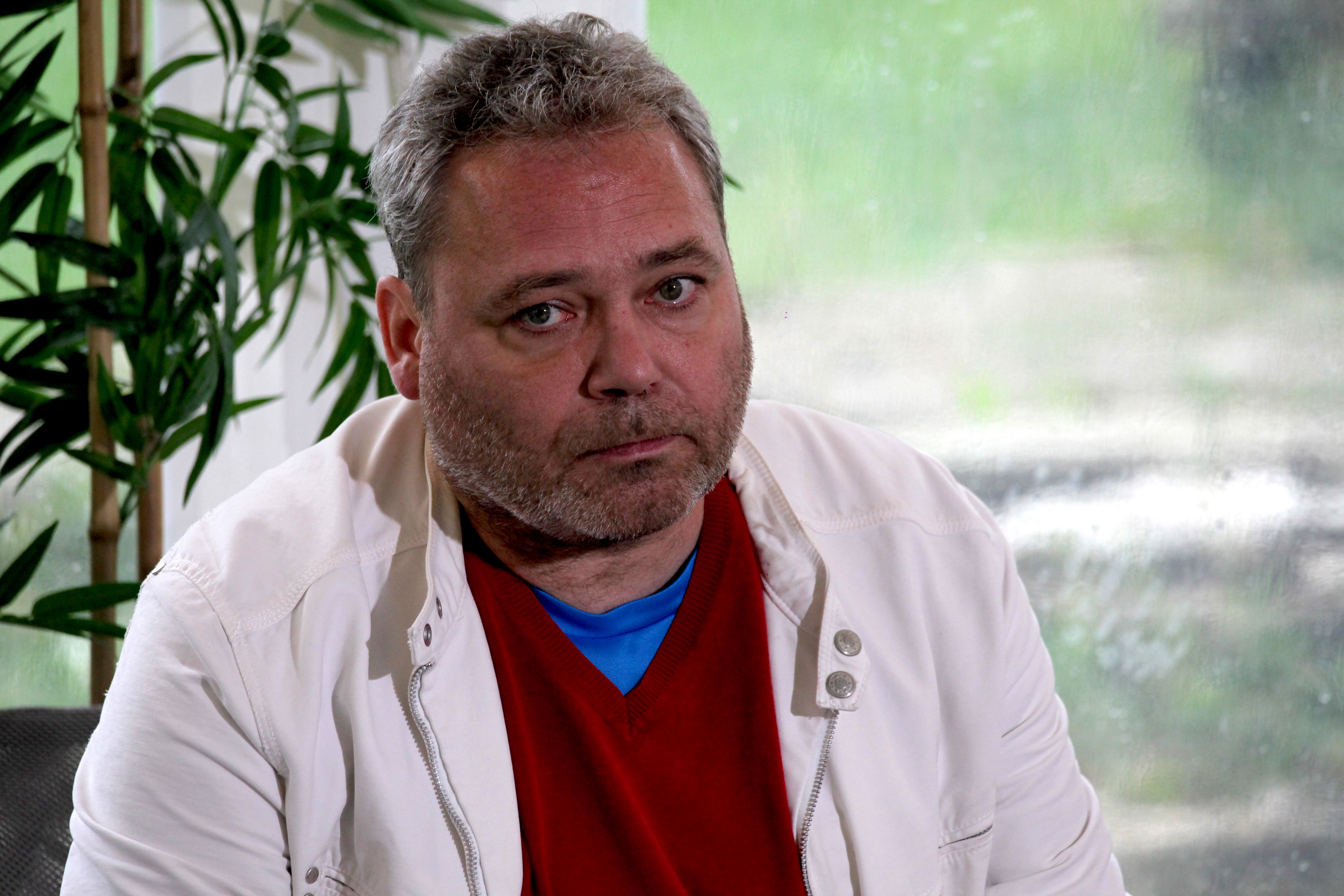
- Mertelsmann in 2021
- Born: 15 January 1969 (age 57); Germany
- Education: University of Hamburg
- Scientific career
- Fields: History
- Workplaces: University of Tartu

Olaf Mertelsmann (born 15 January 1969) is a German historian and a professor at the University of Tartu. Mertelsmann's primary interest is the history of the Soviet Union, with concentration on post-war period. He has been living in Estonia since 1994.

== Publications ==
- Die Sowjetisierung des estnischen Alltags während des Stalinismus. in: Norbert Angermann et al.: Ostseeprovinzen, Baltische Staaten und das Nationale, LIT Verlag, Münster 2005 ISBN 3-8258-9086-4.
