= Simmu Tiik =

Estonian diplomat (born 1959)

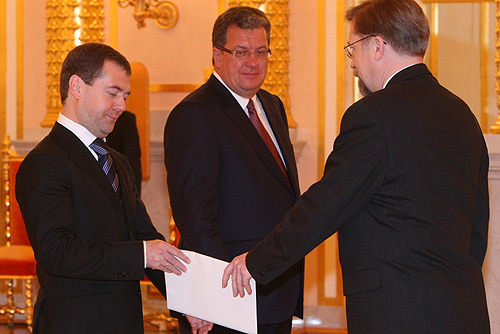
Simmu Tiik presents his letter of credentials to President of Russia Dmitry Medvedev.

Simmu Tiik (born 19 February 1959, in Tartu) is an Estonian diplomat and is the former Ambassador of the Republic of Estonia to Norway and Iceland.

From 2003 to 2006, Tiik was the Ambassador of Estonia to the Republic of Ireland, and from 2009 to 2012 the Ambassador of Estonia to Russia. On 30 July 2012, Tiik was appointed as the Ambassador of Estonia to Norway and Iceland.

Diplomatic posts
Preceded by Raul Mälk	Ambassador of Estonia to Ireland; 2003–2006	Succeeded by Andre Pung
Preceded by Marina Kaljurand	Ambassador of Estonia to Russia; 2008–2012	Succeeded by Jüri Luik
Preceded by Arti Hilpus	Ambassador of Estonia to Norway; 2012–2016	Succeeded by Janne Jõesaar-Ruusalu
