= Jüri Kahn =

Estonian diplomat

Jüri Kahn (born 16 December 1953 in Tallinn) is an Estonian diplomat.

In 1977, he graduated from Tartu University's faculty of mathematics.

1992–1995, he was the Ambassador of Estonia to Russian Federation. 1996–2001, he was the Ambassador of Estonia to Denmark, Norway and Iceland; residing in Copenhagen. From 2004 until, he was the Ambassador of Estonia to Sweden.
