= Tiit Matsulevitš =

Estonian politician (born 1958)

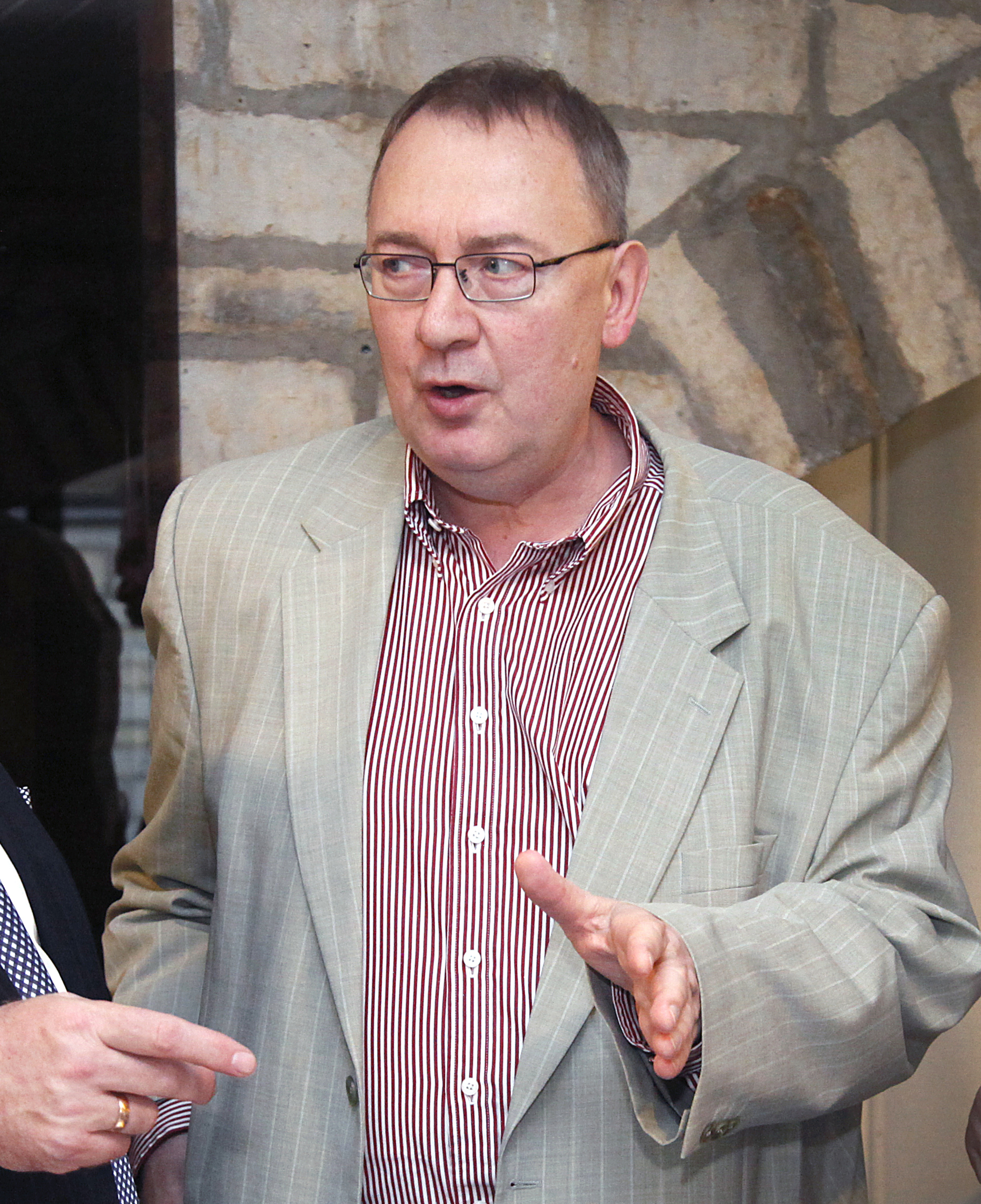
Tiit Matsulevitš, 2013

Tiit Matsulevitš (born September 27, 1958) is an Estonian politician. He was a member of X Riigikogu.
