= Arti Hilpus =

Estonian diplomat

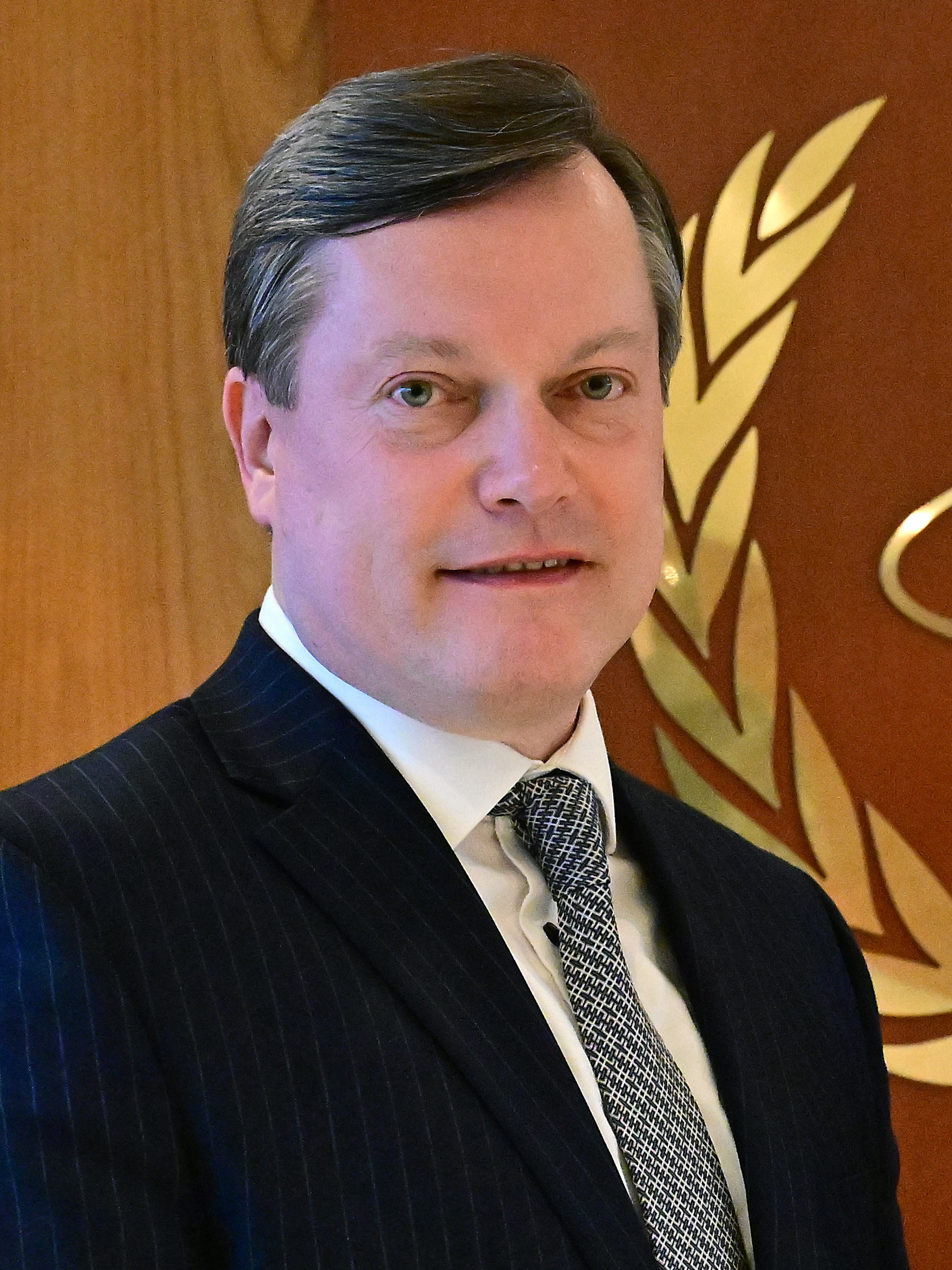
Hilpus in 2025

Arti Hilpus (born 31 October 1972) is an Estonian diplomat.

== Biography ==
Born in Elva, Hilpus has graduated from the University of Tartu, and Geneva Centre for Security Policy.

From 2006 to 2008, he was the Director of the Foreign Ministry's Security Policy Division.

From 2001 to 2004, he was Ambassador of Estonia to Germany, and from 2009 to 2012, Ambassador to Norway and Iceland.

Later, from 2012 to 2015, he served as the Ambassador to Bosnia and Herzegovina, Macedonia, Montenegro, and Serbia, and from 2015 to 2018, Ambassador to Russia.
