= 13th Riigikogu =

Parliament of Estonia 2015–2019

The 13th Riigikogu was the thirteenth legislature of the Estonian Parliament (Riigikogu). The legislature was elected after 2015 election.

== Election results ==
Party	Votes	%	Seats	+/–
Estonian Reform Party	158,970	27.7	30	–3
Estonian Centre Party	142,458	24.8	27	+1
Social Democratic Party	87,189	15.2	15	–4
Pro Patria and Res Publica Union	78,699	13.7	14	–9
Free Party	49,882	8.7	8	New
Conservative People's Party	46,772	8.1	7	+7
Estonian Greens	5,193	0.9	0	0
Party of People's Unity	2,289	0.4	0	New
Estonian Independence Party	1,047	0.2	0	0
Estonian United Left Party	764	0.1	0	New
Independents	887	0.2	0	0
Invalid/blank votes	3,760	–	–	–
Total	577,910	100	101	0
Registered voters/turnout	899,793	64.2	–	–
Source: VVK

== Officers ==
Speaker of the Riigikogu: Eiki Nestor.
