= Opinion polling for the next Estonian parliamentary election =

In the run-up to the next Estonian parliamentary election, various organisations are carrying out opinion polling to gauge voting intentions in Estonia. Results of such polls are displayed in this article.

The date range for these opinion polls are from the 2023 Estonian parliamentary election held on 5 March. Poll results are listed in the table below in reverse chronological order, showing the most recent first. The highest percentage figure in each poll is displayed in bold, and the background shaded in the leading party's colour. In the instance that there is a tie, then no figure is shaded.

== Poll trackers ==
Trackers of voting intentions and other election-related polling:

- Europe Elects
- Politico
- Politpro
- ERR (in Estonian)
- Reitingud (in Estonian)

== Graphical summary ==
Local regression chart of poll results up to 1 October 2025

== Polling results ==
There are 101 seats in the Riigikogu in total. Parties are denoted with an em dash if no indication is given of their level in polls.

=== 2026 ===
Fieldwork date	Polling firm	Sample size	Ref	EKRE	Kesk	E200	SDE	Isamaa	VL	Koos	Parem	EER	ERK	Others	Lead	Gov.	Opp.
9–18 Nov	Emor	1,453	10.9	13.8	**24.7**	1.5	20.5	18.9	—	—	5.5	1.4	1.6	—	**4.2**	12.4	87.6
9–15 Nov	Norstat	1,000	14.7	12.8	**24.7**	0.9	16.3	21.5	—	0.9	5.4	1.0	0.3	1.5	**3.2**	15.6	84.4
5–11 Nov	Turu-uuringute AS	878	9	14	**23**	1	20	18	0	1	7	1	1	4	**3**	10	90
2–8 Nov	Norstat	1,000	11.2	13.1	**25.1**	0.6	18.7	20.9	—	0.6	6.8	0.6	0.3	2.0	**4.2**	11.8	88.2
26 Oct – 1 Nov	Norstat	1,000	12.2	11.0	**26.4**	0.6	18.5	22.6	—	0.4	5.7	1.0	0.1	2.3	**0.9**	12.8	87.2
19–25 Oct	Norstat	1,000	11.2	13.2	**23.3**	1.9	16.3	22.4	—	0.6	5.4	0.7	0.6	2.3	**0.9**	13.1	86.9
12–21 Oct	Emor	1,487	14.2	13.8	**20.6**	1.5	20.4	19.4	0	1.7	6.5	0.8	1.0	—	**0.2**	15.7	84.3
13–18 Oct	Norstat	1,000	11.8	14.5	**23.0**	1.4	17.6	22.3	—	0.4	6.9	0.3	0.2	1.6	**0.7**	13.2	86.8
4–12 Oct	Norstat	1,000	12.5	12.2	22.3	1.4	16.8	**25.1**	—	1.1	5.8	0.4	0.6	1.5	**2.8**	13.9	86.1
1–7 Oct	Turu-uuringute AS	899	10	18	**21**	2	14	19	0	1	8	1	1	2	**2**	12	88
28 Sep – 3 Oct	Norstat	1,000	13.6	14.9	**22.2**	1.1	15.1	21.8	0	0.5	7.2	0.8	0	2.3	**0.4**	14.7	85.3
22–27 Sep	Norstat	1,000	12.4	14.2	19.1	1.6	14.4	**27.6**	0	0.7	7.7	0.9	0	1.4	**8.5**	14.0	86.0
14–23 Sep	Emor	1,535	14.5	13.0	16.9	1.9	17.4	**23.8**	—	—	9.6	1.1	0	—	**6.4**	16.4	83.6
14–19 Sep	Norstat	1,000	13.8	15.3	23.0	0.9	14.7	**23.7**	—	0.8	4.4	0.8	0.5	0.4	**0.7**	14.7	85.3
7–13 Sep	Norstat	1,000	14.7	12.5	**22**	1.6	14.0	21.6	—	1.0	8.3	1.0	0.5	0.3	**0.4**	16.3	83.7
3–7 Sep	Turu-uuringute AS	872	12	16	21	1	15	**22**	0	1	9	1	0	3	**1**	13	87
24–29 Aug	Norstat	1,000	13.5	11.8	20.4	1.5	19.1	**24.1**	0	0.9	6.7	0.3	0	0.3	**3.7**	15.0	85.0
17–23 Aug	Norstat	1,000	13.3	11.3	23.6	1.5	13.9	**25.9**	0	0.8	7.5	0.7	0.1	0.5	**2.3**	14.8	85.2
9–15 Aug	Norstat	1,000	13.0	13.9	21.2	1.6	14.4	**22.3**	0	0.8	7.9	1.3	0.5	0.7	**1.1**	14.6	85.4
6–12 Aug	Turu-uuringute AS	902	11	13	21	1	15	**24**	0	1	9	1	0	3	**3**	12	88
2–9 Aug	Norstat	1,000	11.7	13.8	21.5	1.9	13.5	**29.9**	0.3	0.4	4.4	0.7	0.3	0.8	**8.4**	13.6	86.4
26 Jul – 2 Aug	Norstat	1,000	14.1	12.2	22.7	1.4	15.4	**25.3**	0	0.3	5.8	0.7	0.6	0.3	**2.6**	15.5	84.5
20–26 Jul	Norstat	1,000	12.1	12.9	23.1	1.2	15.4	**25.1**	0.3	0.5	5.2	1.2	0.6	0.5	**2.0**	13.3	86.7
13–20 Jul	Norstat	1,000	12.4	17.7	20.3	2.0	13.0	**25.0**	0	1.1	6.5	1.0	0.2	0.1	**4.7**	14.4	85.6
6–16 Jul	Emor	1,554	14.1	14.2	20.3	1.9	14.3	**24.4**	0	0.8	6.8	2.0	1	—	**4.1**	16.0	84.0
6–13 Jul	Norstat	1,000	10.3	15.0	22.4	1.6	11.8	**27.9**	0.1	—	7.0	1.5	—	2.4	**5.5**	11.9	88.1
29 Jun – 5 Jul	Norstat	1,000	13.7	13.4	20.3	2.0	13.8	**26.7**	0	—	5.9	1.1	—	3.1	**6.4**	15.7	84.3
16–25 Jun	Turu-uuringute AS	906	12	13	**22**	3	15	**22**	0	0	7	1	0	5	Tie	15	85
15–20 Jun	Norstat	1,000	12.8	11.8	23	1.6	14.6	**26.3**	0.3	—	6.7	0.5	—	2.8	**3.3**	14.4	85.6
8–17 Jun	Emor	1,587	12	13.4	21.5	2.1	16.2	**23.5**	0	1.1	8.7	0.7	1	—	**2**	14.1	85.9
8–14 Jun	Norstat	1,000	12.5	14.6	24.1	1.6	14.3	**25.5**	0	—	5.1	0.8	—	1.5	**1.4**	14.1	85.9
1–5 Jun	Norstat	1,000	11.7	13.5	20.0	1.5	17.8	**25.7**	0	—	6.3	0.7	—	2.8	**5.7**	13.2	86.8
25–31 May	Norstat	1,000	14.2	13.4	21.0	1.4	11.3	**26.8**	0	—	8.4	1.2	—	2.4	**5.8**	15.6	84.4
18–23 May	Norstat	1,000	11.4	14.3	21.6	3.3	12.5	**28.0**	0.2	—	5.3	1.1	—	2.4	**6.4**	14.7	85.3
11–20 May	Emor	1,429	9.9	13.9	20.6	2.4	17.4	**23.5**	0	1.0	8.5	1.6	1	—	**2.9**	12.3	87.7
11–17 May	Norstat	1,000	12.5	13.0	20.2	1.0	14.1	**28.9**	0	—	6.2	1.1	—	3.2	**8.7**	13.5	86.5
7–13 May	Turu-uuringute AS	903	11	14	**25**	2	14	20	0	1	11	0	1	2	**5**	13	87
4–10 May	Norstat	1,000	11.7	14.3	21.9	2.0	14.2	**24.4**	—	—	6.0	1.7	—	3.0	**2.5**	13.7	85.5
27 Apr – 3 May	Norstat	1,000	11.0	13.5	23.3	1.3	15.8	**25.9**	—	—	5.4	0.7	—	3.0	**2.6**	12.3	87.6
20–26 Apr	Norstat	1,000	13.0	13.6	20.9	1.9	13.5	**27.7**	—	—	5.9	1.4	—	3.0	**6.8**	14.9	86.0
13–22 Apr	Emor	1,526	12.2	8.7	21.9	3.9	17.0	**25.2**	—	1.0	7.8	1.5	—	—	**3.3**	16.1	83.1
13–19 Apr	Norstat	1,000	12.5	14.4	23.7	0.7	12.7	**25.8**	—	—	7.0	0.8	—	3.0	**2.1**	13.2	87.4
6–12 Apr	Norstat	1,000	12.5	14.8	21.6	2.3	13.8	**26.7**	—	—	5.9	0.3	—	3.0	**5.1**	14.8	86.1
2–8 Apr	Turu-uuringute AS	876	14	11	23	2	14	**24**	0	1	8	1	0	2	**1**	16	84
30 Mar – 5 Apr	Norstat	1,000	12.6	12.0	22.6	1.5	16.6	**24.3**	—	—	5.7	1.1	—	3.0	**1.7**	14.1	85.3
23–28 Mar	Norstat	1,000	14.2	13.5	20.9	2.0	14.0	**24.9**	—	—	6.8	0.9	—	3.0	**4.0**	16.2	84.0
16–21 Mar	Norstat	1,000	12.9	11.5	22.4	1.3	15.5	**26.8**	—	—	6.2	0.8	—	3.0	**4.4**	14.2	86.2
9–18 Mar	Emor	1,515	12.0	13.8	22.8	2.1	14.0	**24.2**	0	1.0	7.0	1.7	1	—	**1.4**	14.1	84.5
9–15 Mar	Norstat	1,000	12.1	11.0	21.4	1.4	14.3	**29.8**	—	—	6.1	0.9	—	3.0	**8.4**	13.5	86.5
5–9 Mar	Turu-uuringute AS	872	13	13	**23**	1	14	22	0	1	7	0	0	4	**1**	14	84
2–7 Mar	Norstat	1,000	14.0	12.6	21.8	2.3	12.2	**26.9**	—	—	6.5	1.0	—	3.0	**5.1**	16.3	84.0
13 Feb – 1 Mar	Norstat	1,000	12.2	11.5	19.5	1.8	13.4	**29.5**	—	—	7.6	1.3	—	3.0	**10.0**	14.0	85.8
16–21 Feb	Norstat	1,000	12.8	14.4	22.4	2.1	14.3	**25.0**	—	—	5.4	0.6	—	3.0	**2.6**	14.9	85.1
11–18 Feb	Kantar Emor	1,446	12.4	13.3	21.3	2.1	15.5	**24.4**	—	0.8	8.1	1.0	—	—	**3.1**	14.5	84.4
9–15 Feb	Norstat	1,000	12.6	13.8	21.1	2.3	12.9	**26.6**	—	—	6.7	1.0	—	3.0	**5.5**	14.9	85.1
5–9 Feb	Turu-uuringute AS	899	12	14	21	2	14	**22**	0	1	9	1	1	3	**1**	14	86
2–7 Feb	Norstat	1,000	14.0	12.4	18.6	1.6	15.3	**28.4**	—	—	6.3	1.1	—	3.0	**9.8**	15.6	85.1
26–31 Jan	Norstat	1,000	15.4	13.2	22.0	1.8	11.9	**28.0**	—	—	4.6	0.5	—	3.0	**6.0**	17.2	81.8
19–24 Jan	Norstat	1,000	15.0	10.9	20.7	2.4	13.4	**26.0**	—	—	6.3	1.3	—	3.0	**5.3**	17.4	81.6
14–21 Jan	Kantar Emor	1,598	12.6	13.3	22.7	1.4	13.5	**25.5**	—	1.4	6.9	1.4	—	—	**2.8**	14.0	84.7
15–19 Jan	Turu-uuringute AS	894	14	15	**20**	3	15	19	0	1	9	1	1	3	**1**	17	84
12–18 Jan	Norstat	1,000	14.3	14.9	21.2	1.5	15.4	**23.5**	—	—	6.8	0.5	—	3.0	**2.3**	15.8	84.2
5–11 Jan	Norstat	1,000	16.2	11.3	19.0	1.6	14.2	**27.7**	—	—	6.1	0.6	—	3.0	**8.7**	17.8	82.2
29 Dec – 3 Jan	Norstat	1,000	13.6	9.3	19.5	2.6	13.1	**31.4**	—	—	7.2	0.4	—	3.0	**11.9**	16.2	83.8
**5 Mar 2023**	**2023 election**		**31.2; 37**	**16.1; 17**	**15.3; 16**	**13.3; 14**	**9.3; 9**	**8.2; 8**	**2.4; 0**		**2.3; 0**	**1.0; 0**	—	**1.0; 0**	**15.1; 19**	**53.8; 60**	**46.2; 41**

=== 2025 ===
Fieldwork date	Polling firm	Sample size	Ref	EKRE	Kesk	E200	SDE	Isamaa	VL	Koos	Parem	EER	ERK	Others	Lead	Gov.	Opp.
15–21 Dec	Norstat	1,000	11.0	15.5	22.1	1.4	14.6	26.1	—	—	6.2	1.1	—	2.0	**4.0**	12.4	87.6
8–14 Dec	Norstat	1,000	12.3	14.0	19.5	2.4	13.8	29.1	—	—	6.7	0.7	—	1.5	**9.6**	14.7	85.3
4–10 Dec	Turu-uuringute AS	877	12	15	**22**	1	15	22	0	1	7	1	1	3	Tie	13	87
3–10 Dec	Kantar Emor	1,621	13.7	11.7	20.7	2.6	14.6	23.6	—	1.2	8.8	1.0	—	—	**2.9**	16.3	81.6
1–7 Dec	Norstat	1,000	11.5	14.4	22.1	2.4	14.9	26.1	—	—	6.2	1.4	—	1.0	**4.0**	13.9	86.1
24–30 Nov	Norstat	1,000	10.1	15.6	20.8	1.0	16.3	28.2	—	—	5.4	1.0	—	1.6	**7.4**	11.1	88.9
17–23 Nov	Norstat	1,000	10.7	14.4	19.7	2.0	14.1	29.1	—	—	7.4	0.9	—	1.7	**9.4**	12.7	87.3
10–16 Nov	Norstat	1,000	11.2	14.2	21.8	2.8	11.7	28.7	—	—	7.3	1.0	—	1.3	**6.9**	14.0	86.0
3–12 Nov	Kantar Emor	1,483	11.6	12.9	19.0	2.5	15.6	25.6	—	1.4	8.7	1.3	—	—	**6.6**	14.1	84.5
6–10 Nov	Turu-uuringute AS	887	13	13	19	2	15	22	0	1	9	1	1	3	**7**	15	84
3–9 Nov	Norstat	1,000	10.9	13.4	21.4	0.9	13.2	30.4	—	—	7.6	0.3	—	1.9	**9.0**	11.8	88.2
27 Oct – 2 Nov	Norstat	1,000	10.8	14.8	22.0	1.9	11.8	29.5	—	—	7.1	1.1	—	1.0	**7.5**	12.7	87.3
20–26 Oct	Norstat	1,000	10.5	13.4	23.7	2.1	12.9	30.2	—	—	5.1	0.4	—	1.7	**6.5**	12.6	87.4
19 Oct	**The 2025 Estonian municipal elections are held**																
13–17 Oct	Norstat	1,000	10.5	18.8	21.4	1.8	13.6	27.4	—	—	5.0	0.5	—	1.0	**6.0**	12.3	87.7
3–13 Oct	Kantar Emor	1,684	13.1	14.9	19.8	2.5	13.8	22.6	—	1.5	9.3	1.0	—	—	**2.8**	15.6	82.9
6–12 Oct	Norstat	1,000	10.5	18.9	19.4	2.4	11.4	29.0	—	—	5.4	0.8	—	2.2	**9.6**	12.9	87.1
6–9 Oct	Turu-uuringute AS	902	13	14	18	3	15	21	0	1	9	1	0	4	**3**	16	83
29 Sep – 5 Oct	Norstat	1,000	13.2	18.7	20.6	2.1	10.0	27.6	—	—	5.0	0.9	—	1.9	**7.0**	15.3	84.7
22–28 Sep	Norstat	1,000	14.5	17.0	19.0	2.5	12.1	26.4	—	—	6.1	0.9	—	1.5	**7.4**	17.0	83.0
15–22 Sep	Norstat	1,000	10.0	16.4	19.3	2.9	11.2	30.5	—	—	6.0	1.3	—	2.4	**11.2**	12.9	87.1
10–17 Sep	Kantar Emor	1,502	14.2	12.4	18.1	2.0	17.5	23.6	—	2.3	7.6	1.2	—	—	**5.5**	16.2	82.7
8–14 Sep	Norstat	1,000	12.8	15.2	19.8	1.4	12.8	29.1	—	—	6.2	1.1	—	1.6	**9.3**	14.2	85.8
4–9 Sep	Turu-uuringute AS	891	11	13	17	2	13	26	0	1	10	1	0	4	**9**	13	85
1–8 Sep	Norstat	1,000	10.4	17.1	20.6	1.3	13.2	28.3	—	—	6.2	0.5	—	2.4	**7.7**	11.7	88.3
25–31 Aug	Norstat	1,000	13.1	18.3	20.1	3.6	9.8	27.3	—	—	5.4	0.6	—	1.8	**7.2**	16.7	83.3
18–24 Aug	Norstat	1,000	11.3	16.4	20.2	2.7	11.0	27.6	—	—	7.4	2.0	—	1.4	**7.4**	14.0	86.0
13–19 Aug	Kantar Emor	1,547	10.5	15.1	18.6	3.3	14.7	25.4	—	2.2	7.7	1.5	—	—	**6.8**	13.8	85.2
11–17 Aug	Norstat	1,000	12.1	17.7	17.1	1.5	14.1	28.7	—	—	6.1	1.8	—	0.9	**11.0**	13.6	86.4
7–11 Aug	Turu-uuringute AS	892	10	19	16	5	11	21	0	1	10	0	0	5	**2**	15	83
4–9 Aug	Norstat	1,000	9.6	19.3	17.5	3.0	13.8	28.8	—	—	5.7	0.5	—	1.8	**9.5**	12.6	87.4
28 Jul – 3 Aug	Norstat	1,000	14.4	17.0	17.3	3.1	13.5	24.8	—	—	7.8	0.7	—	1.5	**7.5**	17.5	82.6
21–28 Jul	Norstat	1,000	10.1	15.6	17.9	3.0	14.4	31.1	—	—	5.8	0.4	—	1.7	**13.2**	13.1	86.9
14–21 Jul	Norstat	1,000	10.1	20.0	17.2	3.0	14.8	25.5	—	—	6.7	1.6	—	1.1	**5.5**	13.1	86.9
10–17 Jul	Kantar Emor	1,592	14.1	15.3	17.0	3.1	16.2	22.3	—	1.5	7.6	1.7	—	—	**5.3**	17.2	81.6
7–14 Jul	Norstat	1,000	10.4	16.1	18.6	4.2	10.7	31.5	—	—	6.0	1.5	—	1.1	**12.9**	14.6	85.4
30 Jun – 6 Jul	Norstat	1,000	13.8	17.8	17.4	3.3	12.3	26.6	—	—	5.5	0.8	—	2.5	**8.8**	17.1	82.9
16–22 Jun	Norstat	1,000	14.6	19.0	15.7	2.1	11.6	29.8	—	—	4.8	0.6	—	1.8	**10.8**	16.7	83.3
12–18 Jun	Kantar Emor	1,662	15.6	13.6	18.1	3.5	12.3	24.5	—	1.7	7.8	1.4	—	—	**6.4**	19.1	79.4
9–15 Jun	Norstat	1,000	16.8	19.0	16.0	3.4	10.4	28.7	—	—	3.9	0.7	—	1.1	**9.7**	20.2	79.8
5–13 Jun	Turu-uuringute AS	908	19	17	14	4	11	22	0	2	8	1	0	1	**3**	23	77
2–8 Jun	Norstat	1,000	17.9	19.7	15.8	2.5	9.8	26.3	—	—	5.3	1.9	—	0.8	**6.6**	20.4	79.6
26 May – 1 Jun	Norstat	1,000	16.0	17.4	16.4	2.7	12.9	28.1	—	—	4.8	0.6	—	1.2	**10.7**	18.7	81.4
19–25 May	Norstat	1,000	17.9	15.4	17.4	3.8	11.9	23.5	—	—	5.6	2.4	—	2.1	**5.6**	21.7	78.3
14–21 May	Kantar Emor	1,493	15.1	11.9	17.3	3.6	11.6	27.3	—	1.7	7.6	1.8	1.7	—	**10.0**	18.7	80.9
12–18 May	Norstat	1,000	16.1	15.8	17.8	4.3	11.9	26.7	—	—	5.7	0.9	—	0.8	**10.6**	20.4	79.6
5–11 May	Norstat	1,000	18.4	14.0	16.8	1.5	12.8	27.6	—	—	5.8	1.1	—	2.0	**9.2**	19.9	80.1
2–7 May	Turu-uuringute AS	893	17	15	16	3	12	22	0	2	7	2	0	3	**5**	20	79
28 Apr – 4 May	Norstat	1,000	17.6	13.9	13.9	1.8	13.4	30.0	—	—	7.2	0.6	—	1.6	**12.4**	19.4	80.6
21–28 Apr	Norstat	1,000	12.0	16.4	19.1	4.1	11.3	28.1	—	0.9	4.7	1.2	—	2.2	**9.0**	16.1	83.9
14–21 Apr	Norstat	1,000	17.8	19.3	16.8	3.2	11.5	24.2	—	0.4	4.6	1.4	—	0.8	**4.9**	21.0	79.0
9–15 Apr	Kantar Emor	1,488	17.0	14.8	16.5	2.9	11.7	22.8	—	1.6	8.5	2.4	1.1	—	**7.6**	19.9	79.4
7–13 Apr	Norstat	1,000	19.4	14.9	17.3	3.3	8.8	28.1	—	0.5	6.1	0.9	—	0.7	**8.7**	22.7	77.3
3–9 Apr	Turu-uuringute AS	903	19	19	16	3	9	20	0	1	9	2	0	2	**1**	22	78
31 Mar – 6 Apr	Norstat	1,000	20.2	15.4	18.4	3.6	9.6	25.1	—	1.2	4.7	1.2	—	0.6	**4.9**	23.8	76.2
24–30 Mar	Norstat	1,000	17.5	13.5	14.2	4.0	12.5	28.8	—	0.8	6.4	1.7	—	0.6	**11.3**	21.5	78.5
17–23 Mar	Norstat	1,000	18.1	16.3	17.0	1.4	10.1	30.2	—	1.0	3.7	1.1	—	1.1	**12.1**	19.5	80.5
12–19 Mar	Kantar Emor	1,587	17.6	14.0	16.0	3.0	11.9	25.2	—	1.3	8.4	1.4	0.9	—	**7.6**	20.6	79.4
10–16 Mar	Norstat	1,000	16.2	18.1	14.9	1.7	8.8	33.6	—	0.8	3.3	1.2	—	1.4	**15.5**	17.9	82.1
6–12 Mar	Turu-uuringute AS	891	17	17	13	3	10	29	0	2	6	1	1	2	**12**	20	80
10 Mar	**SDE's expulsion from Kristen Michal's cabinet is announced**																
3–9 Mar	Norstat	1,000	19.7	16.0	15.2	2.7	10.5	30.0	—	0.4	3.9	0.4	—	0.8	**10.3**	32.9	67.1
25 Feb – 2 Mar	Norstat	1,000	13.4	20.1	14.2	2.2	9.6	33.0	—	0.4	4.1	1.1	—	1.9	**12.9**	25.2	74.8
17–23 Feb	Norstat	1,000	15.2	16.6	15.5	3.9	11.1	29.3	—	0.4	4.6	1	—	2.4	**12.7**	30.2	69.8
13–19 Feb	Kantar Emor	1,612	14.4	15.1	15.2	2.6	13.2	29.4	—	1.0	6.3	1.4	0.8	—	**14.2**	30.2	69.8
10–16 Feb	Norstat	1,000	17.2	16.8	13.4	3.2	12	31.3	—	0.8	3.1	1.4	—	0.8	**14.1**	32.4	67.6
7–16 Feb	Turu-uuringute AS	891	18	15	15	4	13	24	0	2	8	0	0	2	**6**	35.0	65.0
3–9 Feb	Norstat	1,000	17.9	17.7	12.8	1.8	12.4	28.4	—	1.5	5	1.1	—	1.4	**10.5**	32.1	67.9
27 Jan – 2 Feb	Norstat	1,000	17.7	15.9	12.3	2.2	10.9	33.1	—	0.8	4.9	1.1	—	1.1	**15.4**	30.8	69.2
16–28 Jan	Turu-uuringute AS	886	20	13	13	3	13	25	0	3	8	1	1	1	**5**	36	65
20–26 Jan	Norstat	1,000	15.3	17	14.3	3	11.4	32.4	—	0.7	4.5	0.9	—	0.5	**15.4**	29.7	70.3
13–22 Jan	Kantar Emor	1,537	15.8	13.6	13.1	3.4	15.5	26	—	2	7.2	2.7	0.5	—	**10.2**	34.7	65.3
13–19 Jan	Norstat	1,000	16.1	16.5	17	3.1	10.4	29.3	—	1.3	4.2	0.3	1.4	0.4	**12.3**	29.6	70.4
6–12 Jan	Norstat	1,000	19.2	14.5	13.9	1.9	13.7	28.9	—	0.7	4.9	1.2	0.6	0.5	**9.7**	34.8	65.2
30 Dec 2024–5 Jan 2025	Norstat	1,000	18	16.2	14.3	2.1	12.4	28.4	—	1.2	3.9	2.3	0.6	0.6	**10.4**	32.5	67.5
**5 Mar 2023**	**2023 election**		**31.2; 37**	**16.1; 17**	**15.3; 16**	**13.3; 14**	**9.3; 9**	8.2; 8	**2.4; 0**		**2.3; 0**	**1.0; 0**	—	**1.0; 0**	**15.1; 19**	**53.8; 60**	**46.2; 41**

=== 2024 ===
Fieldwork date	Polling firm	Sample size	Ref	EKRE	Kesk	E200	SDE	Isamaa	EÜVP	Koos	Parem	EER	ERK	Others	Lead	Gov.	Opp.
16–22 Dec	Norstat	1,000	18.4	17.9	15.3	3.7	11.3	26.4	—	1.4	3	1.4	0.9	0.3	6	33.4	66.6
9–15 Dec	Norstat	1,000	15.8	15.8	14.7	3.2	15.0	25.5	—	1.2	4.5	2.4	1.0	0.9	9.7	34	66
4–11 Dec	Kantar Emor	1,537	17.5	12.2	13.5	3.6	13.3	27.3	—	1.1	6.3	2.1	3.1	—	9.8	34.4	65.6
2–8 Dec	Norstat	1,000	21.0	13.4	13.8	2.9	12.5	28.3	—	0.5	5.6	1.6	0.1	0.3	7.3	36.4	63.6
25 Nov – 2 Dec	Norstat	1,000	21.3	13.8	12.3	3.3	14.3	27.0	—	1.2	3.9	1.1	1.3	0.5	5.7	38.9	61.1
21–30 Nov	Turu-uuringute AS	887	19	14	13	4	13	22	0	2	7	1	1	2	3	36	62
18–24 Nov	Norstat	1,000	21.3	12.1	13.5	4.5	15.1	24.6	—	1.0	4.4	1.1	2.3	0.1	3.3	40.9	59.1
14–21 Nov	Kantar Emor	1,516	17.4	13.7	14.8	4.3	13.9	24.1	—	2.3	6.4	1.4	1.6	—	6.7	35.6	64.3
11–17 Nov	Norstat	1,000	18.0	12.3	13.4	3.8	15.2	27.5	—	0.6	5.3	1.2	2.2	0.5	9.5	37.0	63.0
4–10 Nov	Norstat	1,000	17.6	13.5	17.2	4.8	12.6	26.9	—	1.3	2.9	2.1	0.3	0.8	9.3	35.0	65.0
28 Oct – 3 Nov	Norstat	1,000	17.1	12.6	11.7	3.6	12.8	32.7	—	1.0	5.5	1.6	1.0	0.5	15.6	33.5	66.5
24–30 Oct	Turu-uuringute AS	894	18	10	14	6	16	25	0	2	6	1	1	1	7	40	60
21–28 Oct	Norstat	1,000	16.4	12.3	14.3	3.7	12.8	30.9	—	1.1	5.1	1.2	1.3	0.9	14.5	32.9	67.1
14–21 Oct	Norstat	1,000	20.1	12.0	13.0	3.8	15.7	27.5	—	0.9	4.3	1.7	0.9	0.1	7.4	39.6	60.4
10–16 Oct	Kantar Emor	1,505	17.0	13.3	14.4	2.8	14.9	24.4	—	1.9	6.4	1.9	2.3	—	7.4	34.7	64.6
7–14 Oct	Norstat	1,000	18.2	12.4	11.1	4.7	13.7	31.4	—	0.5	4.6	1.6	1.2	0.6	13.2	36.6	63.4
1–10 Oct	Turu-uuringute AS	886	18	11	9	4	16	27	0	3	6	1	2	3	9	38	62
30 Sep – 6 Oct	Norstat	1,000	18.1	13.2	14.9	4.0	13.5	27.2	—	0.7	6.0	1.3	0.8	0.3	9.1	35.6	64.4
23–29 Sep	Norstat	1,000	21.6	13.6	12.4	3.8	13.3	27.4	—	0.8	4.0	1.1	1.8	0.2	5.8	38.7	61.3
16–23 Sep	Norstat	1,000	16.7	11.7	13.9	4.2	14.3	30.3	—	1.1	4.2	1.1	2.0	0.5	13.6	35.2	64.8
12–18 Sep	Kantar Emor	1,553	18.1	9.5	13.9	3.9	16.0	24.5	—	3.2	5.3	1.3	3.6	—	6.4	38.0	61.3
9–14 Sep	Norstat	1,000	18.1	12.1	13.8	5.0	12.5	28.3	—	1.9	3.9	1.8	1.9	0.7	10.2	35.6	64.4
29 Aug – 12 Sep	Turu-uuringute AS	885	18	12	13	6	16	23	0	1	6	1	3	2	5	40	60
2–8 Sep	Norstat	1,000	20.2	14.6	12.7	4.1	11.1	29.0	—	0.7	5.1	0.8	1.7	0.1	8.8	35.4	64.6
26 Aug – 1 Sep	Norstat	1,000	19.9	11.0	11.0	4.3	16.4	28.3	—	1.3	3.9	1.3	2.2	0.1	8.4	40.6	59.4
19–25 Aug	Norstat	1,000	19.9	11.5	11.4	2.9	18.3	27.3	—	1.1	4.5	0.8	1.9	0.1	7.4	41.1	58.9
15–21 Aug	Kantar Emor	1,528	17.5	9.9	13.6	3.8	18.0	23.0	—	1.9	7.1	1.5	3.6	0.0 (Note: Estonian Free Party – 0.0)	5.5	39.3	60.7
12–19 Aug	Norstat	1,000	17.4	16.0	12.7	2.9	16.2	27.4	—	0.8	2.7	1.2	2.7	3.5	10.0	36.5	63.5
5–11 Aug	Norstat	1,000	20.1	11.6	12.1	3.3	17.9	27.1	—	—	6.2	0.6	—	1.1	7.0	41.3	58.7
1–9 Aug	Turu-uuringute AS	893	16	11	12	3	17	25	0	3	6	2	3	3	8	36	64
23 Jul – 4 Aug	Norstat	1,000	16.6	13.0	11.3	3.2	18.2	29.7	—	—	5.3	0.9	—	1.8	11.5	38	62
22–29 Jul	Norstat	1,000	15.2	15.0	13.0	2.7	17.8	29.4	—	—	4.5	0.9	—	1.5	11.6	35.7	64.3
23 Jul	**Kristen Michal's cabinet is formed by Reform, E200 and SDE**																
15–22 Jul	Norstat	1,000	15.6	12.6	13.6	2.6	17.0	30.2	—	—	4.5	1.6	—	2.3	13.2	35.2	64.8
11–17 Jul	Kantar Emor	1,512	16.0	12.6	13.8	2.6	17.1	27.5	0.4	2.9	5.4	0.6	—	0.0 (Note: Estonian Free Party – 0.0)	10.4	35.7	64.3
8–12 Jul	Norstat	1,000	19.4	11.2	12.5	3.8	16.4	30.3	—	—	3.8	0.5	—	2.3	10.9	39.6	60.4
1–5 Jul	Norstat	1,000	15.2	11.0	12.2	3.3	15.4	33.7	—	—	5.8	1.9	—	1.5	18.3	33.9	66.1
17–24 Jun	Norstat	1,000	16.4	13.0	13.6	3.7	16.1	30.0	—	—	4.7	1.2	—	1.3	13.6	36.2	63.8
10–17 Jun	Kantar Emor	1,557	16.0	12.8	14.1	2.6	17.5	27.1	0.4	—	8.4	1.2	—	—	9.6	36.1	64.0
10–17 Jun	Norstat	1,000	15.6	11.8	12.5	2.4	17.8	30.5	—	—	6.1	1.3	—	2.0	12.7	35.8	64.2
1–11 Jun	Turu-uuringute AS	889	20	15	11	4	17	23	0	2	5	1	—	2	3	41	59
3–10 Jun	Norstat	1,000	17.8	16.3	10.0	2.9	14.1	29.6	—	—	6.9	0.8	—	1.6	11.8	34.8	65.2
9 Jun	2024 EU Election		17.9	14.9	12.4	2.6	19.3	21.5	—	3.1	6.8	0.6	—	0.8	2.2	39.8	60.1
27 May – 1 Jun	Norstat	1,000	19.3	13.6	10.0	5.6	14.2	29.0	—	—	5.9	0.7	—	1.7	9.7	39.1	60.9
20–27 May	Norstat	1,000	19.4	17.6	13.3	5.3	16.2	23.5	—	—	2.8	0.6	—	1.3	4.1	40.9	59.1
9–21 May	Turu-uuringute AS	897	17	16	8	6	19	22	0	2	5	2	—	3	3	42	58
13–20 May	Norstat	1,000	19.4	12.7	12.3	7.5	12.1	27.7	—	—	4.9	2.1	—	1.3	8.3	39.0	61.0
6–15 May	Kantar Emor	1,471	17.5	17.0	12.7	4.9	18.0	21.5	1.0	—	5.4	2.0	—	—	3.5	40.4	59.6
6–13 May	Norstat	1,000	18.0	15.7	12.3	6.1	14.1	29.1	—	—	2.3	1.7	—	0.7	11.1	38.2	61.8
29 Apr – 6 May	Norstat	1,000	17.8	17.5	11.9	4.2	15.9	27.6	—	—	2.8	1.8	—	0.4	9.8	37.9	62.0
22–29 Apr	Norstat	1,000	19.7	19.8	8.3	4.6	14.4	26.5	—	—	3.9	2.2	—	0.6	6.7	38.7	61.3
15–22 Apr	Norstat	1,000	20.5	17.9	10.7	4.2	12.6	27.1	—	—	4.2	2.2	—	0.6	6.6	37.3	62.7
9–17 Apr	Kantar Emor	N/A	18.8	18.3	13.8	4.8	14.2	22.1	1.2	—	4.6	2.2	—	—	3.3	37.8	62.2
8–15 Apr	Norstat	1,000	15.2	16.7	10.8	7.8	16.4	28.7	—	—	2.3	1.1	—	1.0	12.0	39.4	60.6
4–11 Apr	Turu-uuringute AS	871	19	15	10	5	13	27	0	1	4	2	—	3	8	37	62
1–8 Apr	Norstat	1,000	18.6	20.2	8.9	4.9	14.3	26.9	—	—	3.8	1.3	—	1.1	6.7	37.8	62.2
25–29 Mar	Norstat	1,000	17.3	17.4	12.8	4.5	14.3	27.9	—	—	3.5	1.0	—	1.3	10.5	36.1	63.9
18–25 Mar	Norstat	1,000	18.0	19.2	11.2	4.5	15.2	28.5	—	—	1.8	1.0	—	0.6	9.3	37.7	62.3
14–20 Mar	Kantar Emor	1,567	15.0	16.1	13.9	3.6	17.6	26.7	0.6	—	4.5	1.9	—	—	9.1	36.2	63.7
11–18 Mar	Norstat	1,000	17.8	19.7	10.0	6.7	13.7	26.8	—	—	2.0	2.1	—	1.2	7.1	38.1	61.9
7–18 Mar	Turu-uuringute AS	909	17	19	10	6	15	25	0	1	3	1	—	1	6	38	60
4–8 Mar	Norstat	1,000	16.2	16.3	10.5	6.6	15.2	30.9	—	—	2.1	2.1	—	0.1	14.6	38.0	62.0
26 Feb – 4 Mar	Norstat	1,000	14.9	19.8	12.8	5.8	13.0	29.3	—	—	2.0	1.4	—	1.0	9.5	33.7	66.3
19–23 Feb	Norstat	1,000	19.7	20.1	10.2	5.1	11.6	29.2	—	—	2.1	1.6	—	0.4	9.1	36.4	63.6
12–19 Feb	Norstat	1,000	16.2	18.0	13.7	5.8	13.3	28.7	—	—	2.5	1.3	—	0.5	10.7	35.3	64.7
8–19 Feb	Turu-uuringute AS	889	18	17	8	7	16	24	0	2	3	2	—	2	6	41	60
7–14 Feb	Kantar Emor	1,579	16.7	15.2	11.8	5.3	17.2	27.0	0.7	—	3.2	2.9	—	—	9.8	39.2	60.8
5–9 Feb	Norstat	1,000	20.0	16.4	8.1	3.0	17.1	31.3	—	—	2.8	0.8	—	0.5	11.3	40.1	59.9
28 Jan – 2 Feb	Norstat	1,000	17.2	18.9	9.7	4.5	16.1	29.1	—	—	1.7	1.7	—	1.1	10.2	37.8	62.2
22–26 Jan	Norstat	1,000	13.5	21.5	12.5	6.5	17.1	25.3	—	—	1.5	1.1	—	1.0	3.8	37.1	62.9
18–25 Jan	Turu-uuringute AS	872	16	16	12	5	18	25	0	2	3	1	—	2	7	39	61
17–24 Jan	Kantar Emor	1,498	18.7	17.4	14.0	3.9	17.2	22.1	0.6	—	3.7	2.4	—	—	3.4	39.8	60.2
15–22 Jan	Norstat	1,000	18.8	17.9	11.0	6.8	17.5	23.5	—	—	2.3	1.5	—	0.7	4.7	43.1	56.9
8–12 Jan	Norstat	1,000	17.5	15.3	12.3	5.3	16.1	27.3	—	—	2.8	2.8	—	0.6	9.8	38.9	61.1
2–8 Jan	Norstat	1,000	19.5	17.6	15.1	5.7	11.7	26.2	—	—	2.2	1.6	—	0.4	6.7	36.9	63.1
**5 Mar 2023**	**2023 election**		**31.2; 37**	**16.1; 17**	**15.3; 16**	**13.3; 14**	**9.3; 9**	8.2; 8	**2.4; 0**		**2.3; 0**	**1.0; 0**	—	**1.0; 0**	15.1; 19	**53.8; 60**	**46.2; 41**

=== 2023 ===
Fieldwork date	Polling firm	Sample size	Ref	EKRE	Kesk	E200	SDE	Isamaa	EÜVP	Koos	Parem	EER	Others	Lead	Gov.	Opp.
18–22 Dec	Norstat	1,000	16.3	19.6	14.9	6.6	10.5	**27.1**	—	—	2.8	1.4	0.8	**7.5**	33.4	66.6
11–18 Dec	Norstat	1,000	16.4	20.4	14.2	5.8	10.7	**26.7**	—	—	2.8	1.6	1.4	**6.3**	32.9	67.1
6–13 Dec	Kantar Emor	1,497	15.2	19.8	15.2	6.1	11.8	**24.9**	0.4	—	4.1	2.7	—	**5.1**	33.1	67.1
4–8 Dec	Norstat	1,000	16.8	22.5	16.2	5.5	10.4	**25.4**	—	—	1.6	0.9	0.7	**2.9**	32.7	67.3
30 Nov – 6 Dec	Turu-uuringute AS	871	18	16	12	6	13	**26**	0	2	4	1	3	**8**	37	62
27 Nov – 1 Dec	Norstat	1,000	17.0	19.9	15.7	6.5	10.9	**26.5**	—	—	1.5	1.4	0.6	**6.6**	34.4	65.6
20–24 Nov	Norstat	1,000	18.2	20.8	14.0	6.9	10.6	**25.8**	—	—	1.5	1.7	0.5	**5.0**	35.7	64.3
16–22 Nov	Kantar Emor	1,494	16.1	20.6	13.4	6.3	12.9	**24.8**	0.4	—	3.3	2.1	—	**4.2**	35.3	64.6
13–17 Nov	Norstat	1,000	16.3	19.3	14.4	5.5	9.4	**30.6**	—	—	1.8	1.5	1.2	**11.3**	31.2	68.8
6–10 Nov	Norstat	1,000	17.3	24.0	10.1	6.1	11.6	**26.7**	—	—	2.3	1.1	0.8	**2.7**	35.0	65.0
30 Oct – 6 Nov	Norstat	1,000	16.7	24.1	14.3	5.0	9.2	**25.6**	—	—	2.5	1.5	1.1	**1.5**	30.9	69.1
26 Oct – 6 Nov	Turu-uuringute AS	899	18.0	20.5	10.9	5.1	10.0	**25.9**	0.5	1.9	3.7	1.1	2.3	**5.0**	33.1	66.8
23–27 Oct	Norstat	1,000	20.3	**22.1**	14.7	6.1	11.0	21.6	—	—	2.7	1.0	0.5	**0.5**	37.4	62.6
16–20 Oct	Norstat	1,000	18.3	**24.6**	13.1	6.6	10.1	22.6	—	—	2.9	1.1	0.7	**2.0**	35.0	65.0
13–18 Oct	Kantar Emor	1,486	**19.7**	17.4	14.3	7.2	14.8	18.5	1.2	—	4.1	2.8	—	**1.2**	41.7	58.3
10–13 Oct	Norstat	1,000	20.4	**22.3**	15.9	6.2	9.6	20.1	—	—	2.8	1.8	0.9	**1.9**	36.2	63.8
3–9 Oct	Norstat	1,000	20.4	**24.0**	15.1	6.2	10.9	17.0	—	—	3.4	1.8	1.2	**3.6**	37.5	62.5
28 Sep – 6 Oct	Turu-uuringute AS	879	**23**	19	14	8	10	16	1	2	4	2	1	**4**	41	59
26 Sep – 2 Oct	Norstat	1,000	**23.2**	21.8	14.4	6.8	10.2	18.0	—	—	3.2	1.7	0.7	**1.4**	40.2	59.8
18–25 Sep	Norstat	1,000	23.2	**24.8**	15.0	6.2	9.7	16.9	—	—	2.4	1.0	0.8	**1.6**	39.1	60.9
14–20 Sep	Kantar Emor	1,491	**24.2**	20.6	16.4	7.3	11.9	12.8	0.5	—	4.1	2.2	—	**3.6**	43.4	56.6
11–18 Sep	Norstat	1,000	**25.1**	21.2	15.5	6.1	10.7	15.2	—	—	2.7	2.3	1.1	**3.9**	41.9	58.0
4–11 Sep	Norstat	1,000	**25.8**	24.1	16.6	6.6	10.1	13.1	—	—	1.1	1.5	1.1	**1.7**	42.5	57.5
31 Aug – 10 Sep	Turu-uuringute AS	891	**23**	20	18	6	10	14	1	—	4	2	1	**3**	39	60
29 Aug – 4 Sep	Norstat	1,000	**25.2**	**25.2**	16.8	6.2	8.6	13.3	—	—	1.4	2.8	0.5	Tie	40.0	60.0
21–28 Aug	Norstat	1,000	**27.2**	22.5	16.6	7.6	10.5	11.2	—	—	2.7	1.0	0.8	**4.7**	45.3	54.8
14–21 Aug	Norstat	1,000	**24.1**	23.5	19.0	8.9	10.6	9.5	—	—	2.2	1.2	0.9	**0.6**	43.6	56.3
10–16 Aug	Kantar Emor	1,494	**25.3**	17.6	17.0	7.4	13.8	10.6	1.5	—	4.1	2.7	—	**7.7**	46.5	53.5
7–14 Aug	Norstat	1,000	24.9	**25.2**	17.9	8.2	9.2	9.9	—	—	2.5	1.3	1.0	**0.3**	44.0	56.0
3–13 Aug	Turu-uuringute AS	877	23	**24**	16	8	13	9	1	—	3	1	2	**1**	44	56
31 Jul – 7 Aug	Norstat	1,000	**23.8**	**23.8**	18.1	8.5	11.1	10.0	—	—	2.5	1.2	1.0	Tie	43.4	55.6
24–31 Jul	Norstat	1,000	**25.1**	20.2	19.1	9.0	12.0	9.4	—	—	1.5	2.7	1.1	**4.9**	46.1	53.9
18–23 Jul	Norstat	1,000	**29.5**	21.2	17.5	8.0	9.5	9.8	—	—	2.2	1.5	0.7	**8.3**	47.0	52.9
10–20 Jul	Kantar Emor	1,486	**26.3**	20.2	16.2	9.8	11.5	8.5	1.4	—	3.5	2.6	—	**6.1**	47.6	52.4
11–17 Jul	Norstat	1,000	**28.3**	22.6	18.4	6.9	8.9	10.1	—	—	2.6	1.1	1.0	**5.7**	44.1	55.9
4–10 Jul	Norstat	1,000	**25.7**	23.8	17.7	7.3	9.8	10.1	—	—	2.1	1.4	2.1	**1.9**	42.8	57.2
26–30 Jun	Norstat	1,000	**29.3**	24.2	16.1	5.9	9.2	10.0	—	—	1.8	1.9	1.7	**5.1**	44.4	55.6
12–20 Jun	Norstat	1,000	**28.6**	20.4	15.8	9.3	8.6	12.0	—	—	2.3	2.1	1.0	**8.2**	46.5	53.6
8–14 Jun	Kantar Emor	1,476	**24.9**	21.2	16.8	9.4	11.9	9.1	0.6	—	3.9	2.4	—	**3.7**	46.2	54.0
7–13 Jun	Turu-uuringute AS	871	**26**	20	17	10	10	9	1	—	3	2	2	**6**	46	54
6–12 Jun	Norstat	1,000	24.0	**25.4**	15.4	8.3	11.7	10.0	—	—	3.1	0.9	1.1	**1.4**	44.0	56.0
29 May – 6 Jun	Norstat	1,000	**27.7**	21.8	15.1	9.7	9.2	10.3	—	—	2.7	2.1	1.3	**5.9**	46.6	53.3
23–29 May	Norstat	1,000	25.0	**26.3**	18.1	8.3	9.3	8.1	—	—	1.8	1.4	1.8	**1.3**	42.6	57.4
15–22 May	Norstat	1,000	**25.1**	24.5	17.0	10.6	9.7	8.1	—	—	2.3	2.3	0.6	**0.6**	46.4	53.6
10–17 May	Kantar Emor	1,501	**22.7**	22.5	17.6	12.6	10.4	8.0	1.2	—	2.7	2.4	—	**0.2**	45.7	54.4
8–15 May	Norstat	1,000	23.3	**27.0**	20.1	8.8	7.9	7.8	—	—	2.0	1.7	1.4	**3.7**	40.0	60.0
4–15 May	Turu-uuringute AS	879	**23**	20	16	14	10	8	1	—	3	3	2	**3**	47	53
2–6 May	Norstat	1,000	**24.0**	**24.0**	18.6	13.5	7.7	6.9	—	—	2.1	1.1	2.0	Tie	45.2	54.7
25 Apr – 1 May	Norstat	1,000	**24.6**	22.0	15.7	15.1	9.2	6.5	—	—	3.2	2.0	1.6	**2.6**	48.9	51.1
18–24 Apr	Norstat	1,000	**24.4**	22.1	14.7	15.8	7.8	9.0	—	—	3.2	1.7	1.4	**2.3**	48.0	52.0
10–19 Apr	Kantar Emor	1,495	**23.2**	16.5	16.5	16.5	12.1	6.6	1.0	—	4.2	3.2	—	**6.7**	51.8	48.2
17 Apr	**Kaja Kallas' third cabinet is formed by Reform, E200 and SDE**															
10–17 Apr	Norstat	1,000	21.6	**24.6**	17.2	14.2	9.3	7.3	—	—	2.1	2.0	1.6	**3.0**	45.1	54.9
3–11 Apr	Turu-uuringute AS	1,174	**24**	19	13	17	10	8	1	—	4	1	1	**5**	51	49
3–10 Apr	Norstat	1,000	**23.8**	18.2	19.3	16.1	10.1	8.3	—	—	2.6	0.8	0.9	**4.5**	50.0	50.1
27 Mar – 3 Apr	Norstat	1,000	**26.8**	18.3	18.0	14.7	8.4	8.0	—	—	2.2	1.2	2.3	**8.5**	49.9	50.1
20–27 Mar	Norstat	1,000	**24.8**	18.6	17.3	16.0	10.2	7.7	—	—	1.8	1.7	1.9	**6.2**	51.0	49.0
14–20 Mar	Norstat	1,000	**29.3**	17.1	14.2	15.5	11.9	7.5	—	—	1.9	1.0	1.7	**12.2**	56.7	43.3
9–17 Mar	Kantar Emor	1,586	**29.3**	15.7	15.4	16.3	11.6	5.9	1.5	—	2.9	1.6	—	**12.7**	57.2	42.8
7–13 Mar	Norstat	1,000	**30.2**	13.5	14.9	17.5	9.2	8.6	—	—	3.0	1.3	1.7	**13.0**	56.9	43.1
**5 Mar**	**2023 election**		**31.2; 37**	**16.1; 17**	**15.3; 16**	**13.3; 14**	**9.3; 9**	**8.2; 8**	**2.4; 0**		**2.3; 0**	**1.0; 0**	**1.0; 0**	**15.1; 19**	**53.8; 60**	**46.2; 41**

== Demographics ==
=== Estonians ===
Fieldwork date	Polling firm	Sample size	Ref	EKRE	Kesk	E200	SDE	Isamaa	VL	Koos	Parem	EER	ERK	Others	Lead	Gov.	Opp.
12–21 Oct 2026	Emor		16.6	15.4	9.5	1.9	**23.9**	23.2			7.9		—	—	0.7		
14–23 Sep 2026	Emor		17	14.3	6.2	1.7	19.2	**27.5**			11.2		—	—	8		
6–16 Jul 2026	Emor		16	15	12	2	15	**28**			8	2	—	—	12		
8-17 Jun 2026	Emor		14	15	13	2	18	**27**			10		—	—	9		
11-20 May 2026	Emor		12	16	9	3	20	**28**			10		—	—	8		
13-22 Apr 2026	Emor		14	10	11	4	19	**29**			9	2	—	—	10		
9-18 Mar 2026	Emor		14	16	12		16	**28**			8		—	—	12		
11-18 Feb 2026	Kantar Emor		14	15	12		17	**28**			12		—	—	11		
14-21 Jan 2026	Kantar Emor		15	15	12		15	**30**			8		—	—	15		
3-10 Dec 2025	Kantar Emor		16	14	10	3	17	**27**	—				—	—	10		
3-13 Oct 2025	Kantar Emor		15	18	7	3	15	**27**	—		9		—	—	9		
10-17 Sep 2025	Kantar Emor		16	14	9	2	20	**28**	—		9		—	—	8		
August 13 to 19 2025	Kantar Emor		12	17	7	4	17	**30**	—		9		—	—	13		
June 12 to 18 2025	Kantar Emor		19	16	7	4	14	**29**	—		9		—	—	10		
May 14 to 21 2025	Kantar Emor		18	14	7		12	**32**	—		9		—	—	14		
April 9 and 15 2025	Kantar Emor		20	17	6	3	13	**29**	—		10		—	—	9		
March 12 to 19 2025	Kantar Emor		21	16	6	3	12	**29**	—		10		—	—	8		
February 13 to 19 2025	Kantar Emor		17	17	5	3	13	**35**	—		8		—	—	18		
January 13 to 21 2025	Kantar Emor		19	15	5	3	16	**30**	—		8	3	—	—	11		
17–24 Jan 2024	Kantar Emor		22	19	4	4	17	**27**	—		4		—	—	8		
14–20 Sep 2023	Kantar Emor		**29**	23	7	7	12	16	—		3		—	—	6		
8–14 Jun 2023	Kantar Emor		**29**	23	10	10	11	10	—		3		—	—	6		
9–17 Mar 2023	Kantar Emor		**34**	18	7	18	12	7	—		3		—	—	16		

=== Other nationalities ===
Fieldwork date	Polling firm	Sample size	Ref	EKRE	Kesk	E200	SDE	Isamaa	VL	Koos	Parem	EER	ERK	Others	Lead	Gov.	Opp.
12–21 Oct 2026	Emor			7.9	62.9		7.2		—	8			—	—	55		
14–23 Sep 2026	Emor		3.4	6.9	63.9	2.7	9.8	7.5	—		2		—	—	54		
6–16 Jul 2026	Emor		4	8	63		9	8	—	4			—	—	54		
8-17 Jun 2026	Emor			5	66		7	6	—	7			—	—	59		
11-20 May 2026	Emor			6	74		6	3	—	5			—	—	68		
13-22 Apr 2026	Emor		3	3	72	2	7	7	—	5			—	—	65		
9-18 Mar 2026	Emor			5	74		6	4	—	4			—	—	68		
11-18 Feb 2026	Kantar Emor		3	6	70	1	7	6	—	4			—	—	63		
14-21 Jan 2026	Kantar Emor			8	72		5	5	—	6	1		—	—	64		
3-10 Dec 2025	Kantar Emor				73			7	—	6			—	—	66		
3-13 Oct 2025	Kantar Emor			6	67		10		—	8			—	—	57		
10-17 Sep 2025	Kantar Emor			6	65		5		—	12			—	—	53		
August 13 to 19 2025	Kantar Emor		4	6	71		5	1.5	—	11			—	—	60		
June 12 to 18 2025	Kantar Emor				74		5		—	10			—	—	64		
May 14 to 21 2025	Kantar Emor				66	5	10		—	7			—	—	56		
April 9 and 15 2025	Kantar Emor		4	6	68	2	6		—	7			—	—	61		
March 12 to 19 2025	Kantar Emor		3	5	66	1	10	7	—	7			—	—	56		
February 13 to 19 2025	Kantar Emor		2.5	8	62		16	4	—	4			—	—	46		
January 13 to 21 2025	Kantar Emor		3	8	51	3	13	10	—	10	1		—	—	46		
March 14 to 20 2024	Kantar Emor			8	54		17	6	—				—	—	37		
17–24 Jan 2024	Kantar Emor			12	51	3	19	6	3		2	2	—	—	32		
14–20 Sep 2023	Kantar Emor		8	12	52	9	10	2	—				—	—	40		
8–14 Jun 2023	Kantar Emor		9	16	43	6	15	4	—				—	—	37		
March 9 and March 17 2023	Kantar Emor		13	9	47	11	12		—				—	—	37		
