= Left Alliance of Estonia =

Political party in Estonia

Left Alliance of Estonia Eesti Vasakliit
- Abbreviation: VL
- Leader: Collective leadership
- Founded: 28 June 2008
- Merger of: Estonian Left Party; Constitution Party
- Headquarters: Kentmanni 6-123, Tallinn
- Newspaper: VasakUudised
- Membership (2025): ▲505
- Ideology: Since 2023: Democratic socialism Progressivism; 2008–2023: Russian minority politics Eurocommunism (self-proclaimed)
- Political position: Left-wing
- European affiliation: European Left Alliance for the People and the Planet (2026-present) (Note: The party's webpage mentions the European Left Alliance under their European party family segment.); Party of the European Left (2004-2025)
- Colours: Red and Purple (2024–); Pink (2023–2024); Red (2008–2023)
- Riigikogu: 0 / 101
- European Parliament (Estonian seats): 0 / 7

Website
- vasakliit.ee

The Left Alliance of Estonia (Estonian: Eesti Vasakliit), formerly the Estonian United Left Party (Estonian: Eesti Ühendatud Vasakpartei, EÜVP) is a democratic socialist political party in Estonia.

Through the Estonian Left Party, the party, founded in 2008, is the direct descendant of the Communist Party of Estonia, the former ruling party of Estonia during the Estonian Soviet Socialist Republic period. Since 2004, through the Estonian Left Party, the party is a founding member of the Party of the European Left. The party was delisted from the europarty's site and has affiliated/cooperated with the European Left Alliance for the People and the Planet since 2026. (Note: The party's webpage mentions the European Left Alliance under their European party family segment.)

The party started self-reforming in 2023 to be a more youth-oriented "pro-Estonian, modern and Nordic left party", intending to de jure rebrand as Left-Wingers (Estonian: Vasakpoolsed, lit. 'the Left' or 'the Left-Wingers', a mirror of the name used by Parempoolsed) by early 2024.

On 3 February 2024, the party failed to meet the quorum of around half of the members needing to be present to be able to vote on reform proposals in the party congress. Substitute party leader Keijo Lindeberg stated that the party intended to keep the formal name and branding of the Estonian United Left Party while informally using the branding and worldview of Vasakpoolsed.

In late 2024, the party announced plans to rebrand as a socially progressive and economically left-wing party with the name Left Alliance (Estonian: Vasakliit). In June 2025, after purging hundreds of members, the party reached a quorum in the party congress and officially changed the party's name and articles of association. In 2026, the party leadership announced its intention to run in the 2027 Estonian general election.

== Ideology ==
=== Economic policy ===
The party has announced support for a progressive income tax, taxation of corporate profits, inheritance tax, additional social benefits for the needy, establishing fair wages for teachers, police officers, firefighters, and providing additional social security.

=== Social policy ===
The party positions itself as a socially progressive. Its social-policy platform emphasizes equality, social justice, and the protection of marginalized groups. The party advocates for comprehensive welfare programs, inclusive policies, and the promotion of human rights. In 2024–2025, the party underwent internal reform and rebranding, explicitly adopting a more progressive stance on social issues. The party supports free medical and psychological support for transgender people wishing to transition. The party proposes simplifying legal gender change, including recognition of non-binary gender markers. They explicitly aim to protect the rights of LGBTQ+ individuals in all spheres of society. The party promotes gender equality measures to extend to workplace protections and promotion of equal opportunities in education and leadership.

=== Foreign policy ===
The party has stated that it has no tolerance for pro-Kremlin viewpoints, including spreading Kremlin narratives about the Russian invasion of Ukraine or supporting Vladimir Putin's regime, adding that anyone with such views can't be a member of the party. The party agrees with Estonia's existing foreign policy choices when it comes to the Russian invasion of Ukraine and expressed support for Ukraine against Russian aggression.

After the outbreak of the Gaza war, the party has released a statement calling for a ceasefire in Gaza, labelling Benjamin Netanyahu's government 'ultranationalist', describing Israel as an apartheid state, supporting South Africa's position in South Africa v. Israel. The party supports the creation of a Palestinian state free from apartheid and occupation.

== History ==
=== United Left Party era ===
On 28 June 2008, the Estonian Left Party (a party comprising most of the remnants of the post-1990 Communist Party of Estonia) and the Constitution Party (one of two parties representing the Russian minority in Estonia) merged to form the Estonian United Left Party (Eestimaa Ühendatud Vasakpartei). Despite the party's professed adherence to a left-wing direction, some observers and journalists noted that the party was perceived to be more interested in catering to Russian minority politics and has been relatively marginal in Estonian politics. In particular, party chairman Mstislav Rusakov made a comment about the party's apparent obscurity for an interview for Eesti Rahvusringhääling: "The problem is to convey this information to people, because, as I already said, go out into the street, ask: "The United Left Party ...?", they will tell you: "What is this?". Meanwhile, in an opinion article for the online Russian-language edition of Postimees, Valery Saïkovski asserted that the party was primarily relevant for Russian minority politics purposes.

For the 2023 Estonian parliamentary elections, the party ran informally with members of Together who joined the party due to failing to register their own before the registration deadline. The Estonian United Left Party earned a record high of 2.4% votes in the election and thus qualified for state funding for the very first time, shocking many pundits. Most of the votes earned by the party came from voters of Together founder Aivo Peterson.

=== Reform and change in leadership ===
Logo of the Left-Wingers (2023–2024)

In August 2023, then-party leader Igor Rosenfeld was removed by court order and replaced with barrister Keijo Lindeberg as a substitute member of the board until the next party board elections. In September 2023, the party announced its intention to rebrand as Left-Wingers or the Left (Estonian: Vasakpoolsed) by early 2024, launching a new website and social media presence after being informed by the court that law requires the former to exist for every single party.

On 18 December, the party put out a policy statement, in which the party denounced its cooperation with Together in the 2023 parliamentary election, announced that all contacts had been since cut and that the party has no tolerance for pro-Kremlin viewpoints, including spread of Kremlin narratives about the Russian invasion of Ukraine or support for Vladimir Putin's regime, adding that anyone with such views can't be a member of the party. The party reiterated that it agrees with Estonia's existing foreign policy choices, including EU and NATO membership, and expressed support for Ukraine against Russia's aggression. Moreover, the party announced that its main target demographic would be the youth, especially those without a party preference.

The party was set to hold a general meeting to elect new leadership on 3 February 2024 but failed to meet the quorum of around half of the members needing to be present to be able to vote on reform proposals in the party congress. The party did not participate in the 2024 European Parliament election in Estonia due to a lack of funds. In late 2024, the party announced plans to rebrand as a socially liberal and economically left-wing party with the name Left Alliance (Estonian: Vasakliit) with the example of the Finnish Left Alliance.

In June 2025, after purging hundreds of members, the party reached a quorum in the party congress and officially changed the party's name and articles of association.

== Election results ==
=== Parliamentary elections ===
| Election | Votes | % | Seats | +/− | Government |
|---|---|---|---|---|---|
| 2015 | 764 | 0.1 (#10) | 0 / 101 | New | Extra-parliamentary |
| 2019 | 511 | 0.1 (#10) | 0 / 101 | 0 | Extra-parliamentary |
| 2023 (Note: In coalition with Koos.) | 14,605 | 2.4 (#7) | 0 / 101 | 0 | Extra-parliamentary |

=== European Parliament elections ===
| Election | Votes | | | Seats | | Pos. |
| Election | # | % | ± pp | # | ± | Pos. |
|---|---|---|---|---|---|---|
| 2009 | 3,519 | 0.89 | new | 0 / 6 | new | 10th |
| 2014 | 226 | 0.07 | ▼0.82 | 0 / 6 | 0 | 17th |
| 2019 | 221 | 0.07 | 0 | 0 / 6 | 0 | 13th |
