= 2024 European Parliament election in Estonia =

- 6–9 June 2024

All 7 Estonian seats to the European Parliament
- Turnout: 37.66% (▲0.07pp)
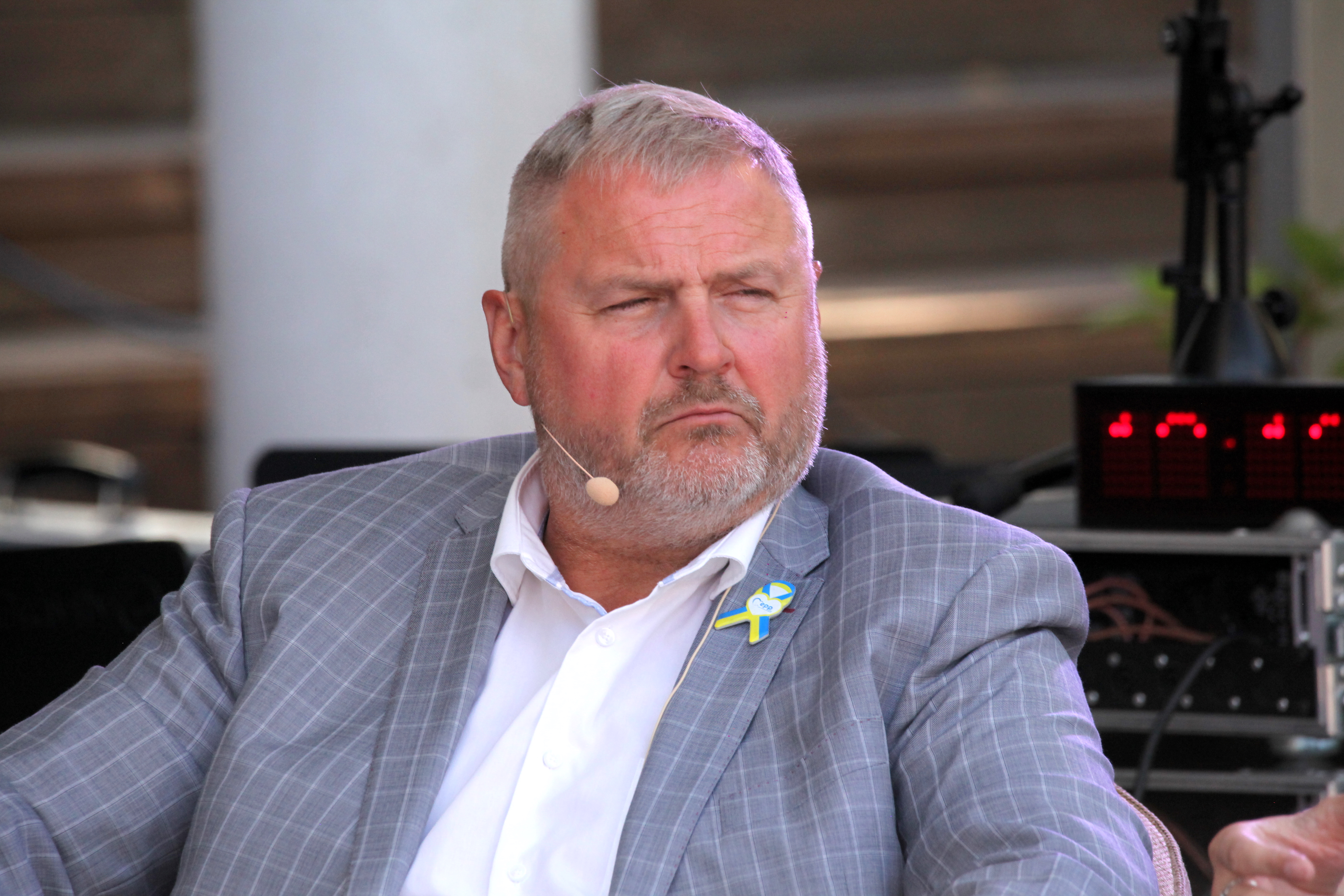

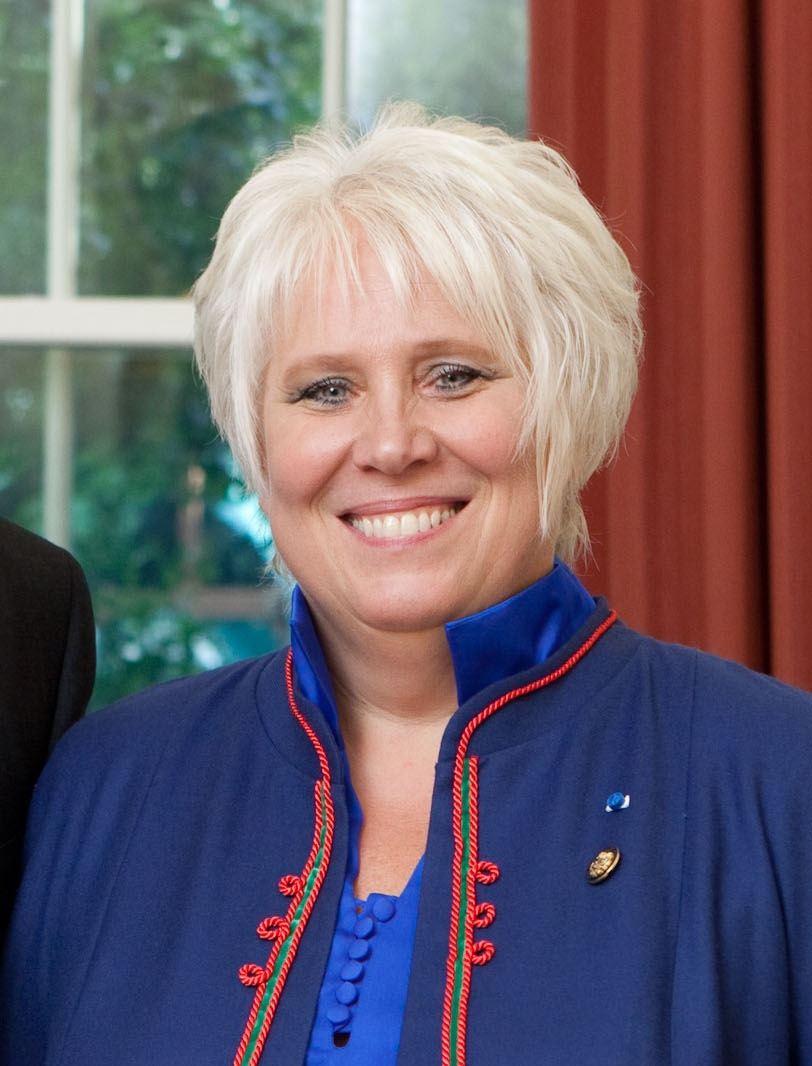

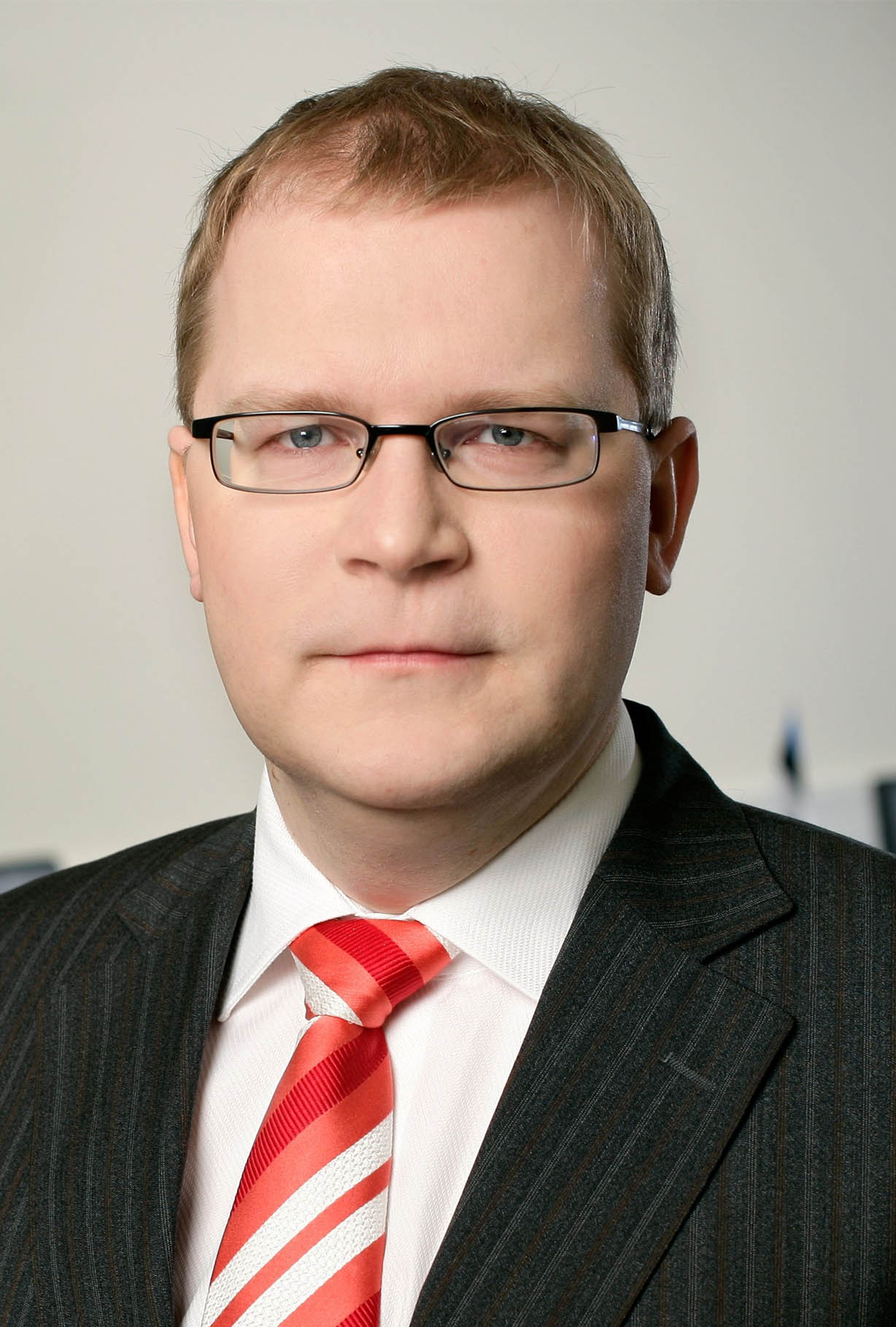

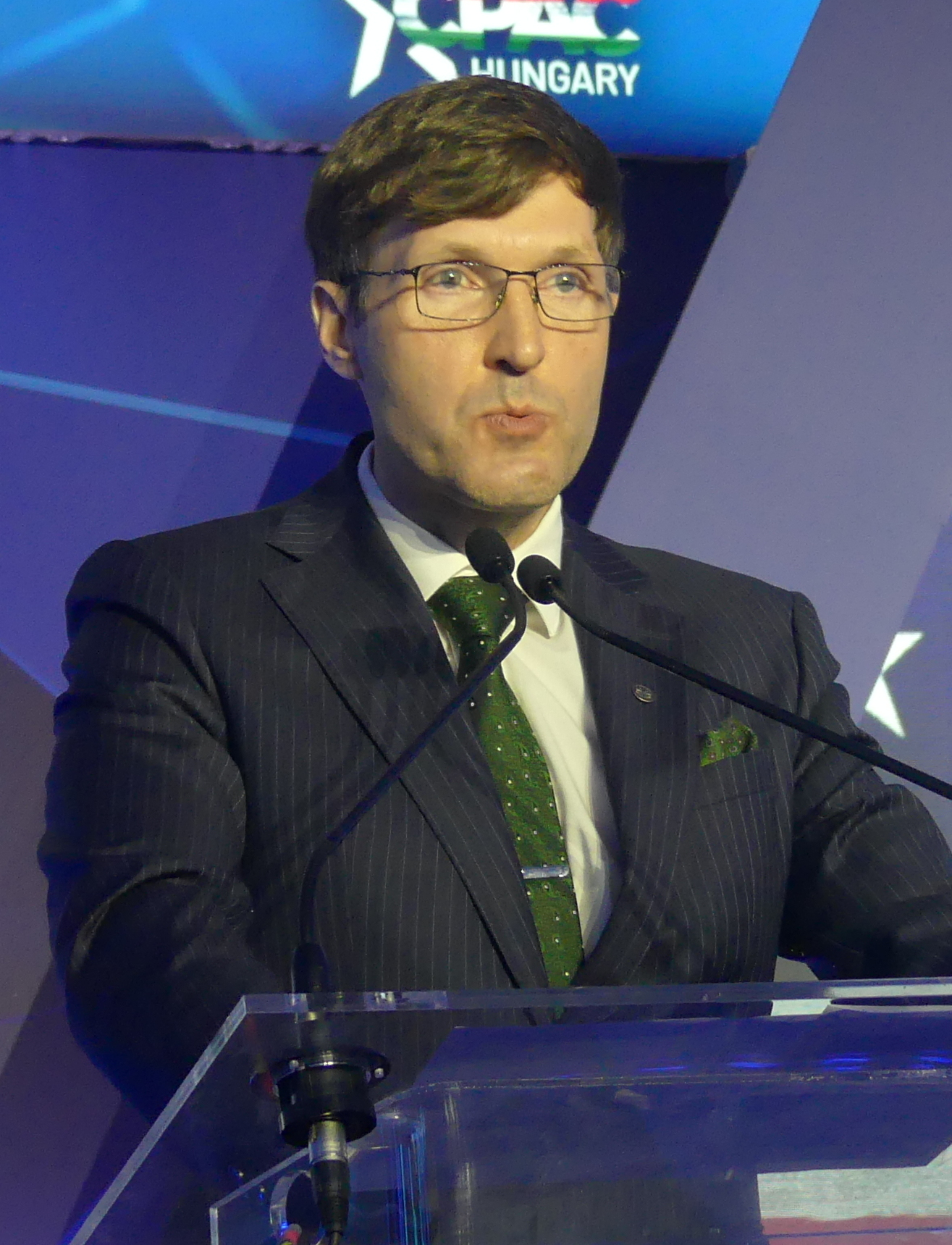

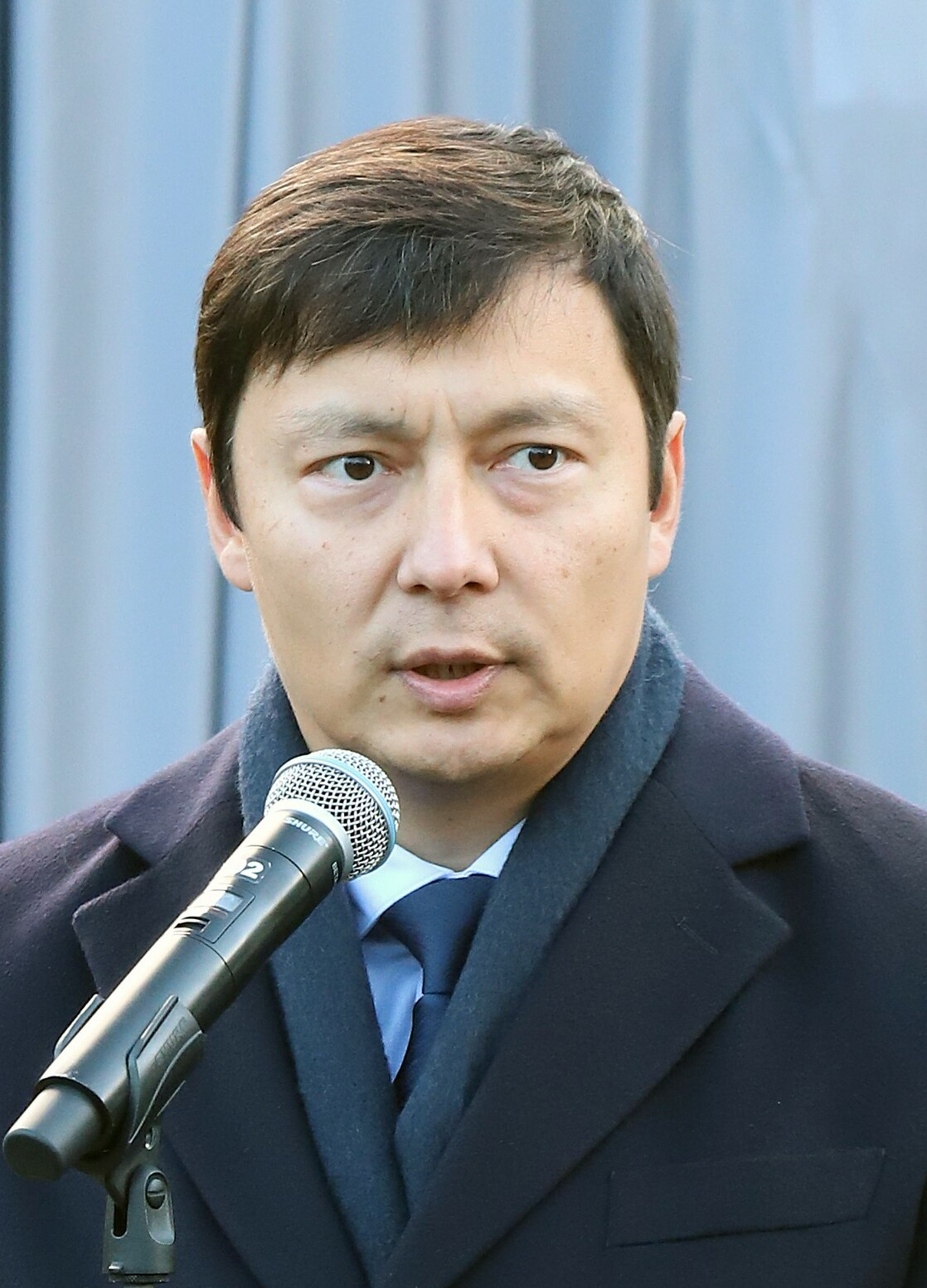
	First party	Second party	Third party
Leader	Riho Terras	Marina Kaljurand	Urmas Paet
Party	Isamaa	SDE	Reform
Alliance	EPP	S&D	RE
Last election	1 seat, 10.3%	2 seats, 23.3%	2 seats, 26.2%
Seats won	2	2	1
Seat change	▲1	Steady	▼1
Popular vote	79,170	71,171	66,017
Percentage	21.5%	19.3%	17.9%
Swing	▲11.2pp	▼4.0pp	▼8.3pp
	Fourth party	Fifth party
Leader	Martin Helme	Mihhail Kõlvart
Party	EKRE	Centre
Alliance	ID	RE
Last election	1 seat, 12.7%	1 seat, 14.4%
Seats won	1	1
Seat change	Steady	Steady
Popular vote	54,712	45,767
Percentage	14.9%	12.4%
Swing	▲2.2pp	▼2.0pp
- Results by county and independent city

An election for the Members of the European Parliament from Estonia as part of the 2024 European Parliament election took place on 9 June. Early voting took place from 3 June to 8 June.

This was the first election since the 1993 Estonian municipal elections that neither the Reform Party, Centre Party nor the Conservative People's Party of Estonia have placed among the top 2 in terms of vote share. Significant attention was also paid to the vote share of Together, whose only candidate Aivo Peterson is and was in Tallinn Prison throughout the campaign due to an ongoing trial after being charged with treason. His eventual vote share was considered by some to help measure pro-Kremlin attitudes in Estonia.

== Background ==
In March 2023 Estonia held its latest national election, and in that occasion the Reform Party managed to maintain its position as biggest party in parliament, while its leader and incumbent Prime Minister Kaja Kallas was reconfirmed in the office with the support of the Social Democratic Party and Estonia 200.

=== Reform Party ===
In recent months the party's performance in opinion polls has suffered significantly from the party's decision to back several tax increases unpopular with the economically liberal voter base as well as due to a scandal involving party leader Kaja Kallas. In August 2023, she came under the international spotlight after it was revealed that her husband held a significant share in a transportation company, Stark Logistics, which continued business with Russia despite Kallas's previous calls for Estonian companies to cease operations in Russia in the aftermath of the Russian invasion of Ukraine. Kallas tried to minimise the affair and ignored the calls for her resignation from her political opponents, calling the controversy a "witch-hunt".

At the same time she has appeared in the news as a prominent figure of the Renew Europe group and therefore as one of the frontrunners to be ALDE's Spitzenkandidat for the European Commission's presidency. She has also been linked to the post of High Representative of the Union for Foreign Affairs and Security Policy, whose current holder Josep Borrell will retire at the end of this mandate, or to the post of Estonia's European Commissioner, currently held by Kadri Simson (Centre Party). On 7 March 2024, Kallas announced that she rejected the offer from ALDE to be the alliance's Spitzenkandidat.

Incumbent MEP Andrus Ansip is not running for re-election.

=== Social Democratic Party ===
Since the 2023 Riigikogu election, the Social Democrats have remained the only party in the government coalition to avoid losing support in polling. This has been attributed to the party members' public statements, especially those of the leader of the party Lauri Läänemets, setting the Social Democrats apart from the two economically liberal parties in the coalition. Moreover, the party gained MPs and members from the defections out of the Centre Party, including seeing its number of MPs increase from 9 to 13.

=== Centre Party ===
In September 2023 Mihhail Kõlvart, then-mayor of Tallinn, won Centre Party's leadership election. His victory marked a significant change in the party's direction, choosing to focus more on its Russophone electoral base and shifting to socially conservative and economically syncretic positions, with the party becoming seen as one specifically of the niche Russian minority concentrated in the capital Tallinn and Ida-Viru County. As a result, in the following months the previous party leader Jüri Ratas and several other party members defected to other political forces, leaving Centre Party with one third of its initial parliamentary representation (down to only 6 MPs) and with an increasingly weaker position in the most recent opinion polls.

=== Isamaa ===
Since August 2023, Isamaa has seen its support rocket to unprecedented historic highs. These gains in polling are mainly attributed to the party gaining 3 MPs and several other members defecting from the Centre Party, EKRE being seen as too extreme of an option as an alternative to the government coalition and the success of the newly elected party leader, Urmas Reinsalu, in attracting disgruntled Reform Party voters unhappy with its plans to raise taxes.

== Electoral system ==
Compared to last election, Estonia is entitled to one more MEP has already been assigned in 2020 in the occasion of the redistribution post Brexit. The 7 members are elected through open list proportional representation in a single nationwide constituency with seats allocated through D'Hondt method and no electoral threshold.

Both Estonian citizens and other non-Estonian EU citizens residing in the country are entitled to vote in the European elections in Estonian. No registration is needed for Estonian citizens, while other EU citizens residing in Estonia are required to register with the National Electoral Committee only if it's their first time voting in the country. Estonian citizens residing abroad can choose between three options to vote: in person in an embassy or consulate, online or by mail, with only the latter procedure requiring registration. In addition, those eligible to vote must turn 18 years old by election day at the latest.

== Outgoing delegation ==
The table shows the detailed composition of the Estonian seats at the European Parliament as of 1 February 2024.

EP Group	Seats	Party	Seats	MEPs
Renew Europe	3 / 7	Estonian Reform Party	2	Andrus Ansip; Urmas Paet
Renew Europe	3 / 7	Estonian Centre Party	1	Jana Toom
Progressive Alliance of Socialists and Democrats	2 / 7	Social Democratic Party	2	Marina Kaljurand; Sven Mikser
Identity and Democracy	1 / 7	Conservative People's Party of Estonia	1	Jaak Madison
European People's Party	1 / 7	Isamaa	1	Riho Terras
Total			7	
Source: European Parliament

== Contesting parties ==
=== Candidates ===
The National Electoral Committee registered 66 candidates from 9 parties and 5 independents.

Reform Party
- Urmas Paet, Member of the European Parliament (2014–present)
- Yoko Alender, Member of the Riigikogu (2015–present)
- Luukas Kristjan Ilves, Counsellor for Digital Affairs at the Estonia's Permanent Representation to the EU (2014–2018)
- Maria Jufereva-Skuratovski, Member of the Riigikogu (2019–present)Marko Mihkelson, Member of the Riigikogu (2003–present)
- Hanah Lahe, Member of the Riigikogu (2023–present)
- Karmen Joller, Member of the Riigikogu (2023–present)
- Maarja Metstak, Kuusalu Parish councillor (2021–present)
- Hanno Pevkur, Minister of Defence (2022–present)
Social Democratic Party
- Marina Kaljurand, Member of the European Parliament (2019–present), independent candidate in the 2016 Estonian presidential election
- Sven Mikser, Member of the European Parliament (2019–present)
- Katri Raik, Mayor of Narva (2020–2023)
- Tanel Kiik, Minister of Health and Labour (2021–2022)
- Riina Sikkut, Minister of Health (2023–present)
- Ivari Padar, Member of the European Parliament (2009–2014, 2017–2019)
- Natalie Mets, Tallinn nightlife advisor (2021–present)
- Vootele Päi, advisor to the Minister of the Interior (2022–present)
- Jevgeni Ossinovski, Mayor of Tallinn (2024–present)
Centre Party
- Mihhail Kõlvart, Mayor of Tallinn (2019–2024)
- Andrei Korobeinik, Member of the Riigikogu (2011–2013, 2019–2022, 2023–present)
- Erki Savisaar, Member of the Riigikogu (2015–2023)
- Anneli Ott, Minister of Culture (2021)
- Janek Mäggi, Minister of Public Administration (2018–2019)
- Monika Haukanõmm, Member of the Riigikogu (2015–2019)
- Aivar Riisalu, Member of the Riigikogu (2007–2015)
- Jana Toom, Member of the European Parliament (2014–present)
- Lauri Laats, Member of the Riigikogu (2023–present)
Conservative People's Party
- Martin Helme, Minister of Finance (2019–2021)
- Anti Poolamets, Member of the Riigikogu (2019–present)
- Helle-Moonika Helme, Member of the Riigikogu (2019–present)
- Henn Põlluaas, Chairman of the Riigikogu (2019–2021)
- Siim Pohlak, Member of the Riigikogu (2019–present)
- Merle Kivest, Tartu city councillor (2021–present)
- Rain Epler, Minister of Environment (2020–2021)
- Arvo Aller, Minister of Rural Affairs (2019–2021)
- Jaak Madison, Member of the European Parliament (2019–present)
Isamaa
- Riho Terras, Member of the European Parliament (2020-present), Commander of the Estonian Defence Forces (2011–2018)
- Urmas Reinsalu, Minister of Foreign Affairs (2019–2021, 2022–2023)
- Urve Palo, Minister of Entrepreneurship (2015, 2016–2018)
- Riina Solman, Minister of Public Administration (2022–2023)
- Tõnis Lukas, Minister of Education and Research (1999–2002, 2007–2011, 2022–2023)
- Virve Linder, Mayor of Kohtla-Järve (2022–2023)
- Üllar Saaremäe, Member of the Riigikogu (2019–2023)
- Ahti Kallikorm, entrepreneur
- Jüri Ratas, Prime Minister of Estonia (2016–2021)
Estonia 200
- Margus Tsahkna, Minister of Foreign Affairs (2023–present)
- Kristina Kallas, Minister of Education and Research (2023–present)
- Grigore-Kalev Stoicescu, Member of the Riigikogu (2023–present)
- Liisa-Ly Pakosta, Member of the Riigikogu (2009–2015, 2023–present)
- Igor Taro, Member of the Riigikogu (2023–present)
- Irja Lutsar, Member of the Riigikogu (2023–present)
- Hendrik Johannes Terras, Member of the Riigikogu (2023–present)
- Kadri Tali, Member of the Riigikogu (2023–present)
- Indrek Tarand, Member of the European Parliament (2009–2019)
Greens
- Evelyn Sepp, Member of the Riigikogu (2001–2011)
- Rasmus Lahtvee
- Alina Lerner-Vilu
- Olev-Andres Tinn
- Riin Ehin
- Kaia Konsap
- Liina Freivald
- Tuula Raidna
- Marko Kaasik
Parempoolsed
- Lavly Perling, state prosecutor general (2014–2019)
- Rainer Saks, national security expert
- Ilmar Raag, columnist
- Annela Anger-Kraavi, climate expert
- Marti Aavik, journalist
- Eero Raun, entrepreneur
- Kadri Kullman, entrepreneur
- Andres Kaarmann, vice mayor of Saue Parish (2017–present)
- Kristjan Vanaselja, entrepreneur
Together
- Aivo Peterson
Others
- Vsevolod Jürgenson, taxi driver and activist
- Kalle Grünthal, Member of the Riigikogu (2019–present)
- Tanel Talve, Member of the Riigikogu (2015–2019)
- Andres Inn
- Mike Calamus

=== Party manifestos and slogans ===
Party	EP Group	Slogan and manifesto (external link)
Reform Party	RE	A safe Estonia in Europe (Estonian: Kindel Eesti Euroopas)
Social Democratic Party	S&D	Freedom, justice, security. (Estonian: Vabadus, õiglus, julgeolek.) (Note: Other slogan: A rock-solid choice! (Estonian: Kaljukindel valik!))
Centre Party	RE	Stand tall, Estonia! (Estonian: Selg sirgu, Eesti!)
Conservative People's Party	ID	For Estonia in Europe (Estonian: Eesti eest Euroopas)
Isamaa	EPP	To the right path! (Estonian: Õigele teele!)
Estonia 200	No	Yes-people to Europe (Estonian: Jah-inimesed Euroopasse)
Greens	No	
Parempoolsed	No	Let's defend freedom! (Estonian: Kaitseme vabadust!)
Together	No	

== Campaign ==
=== Controversies ===
==== Greens' candidate list ====
The Greens originally announced a full list of 9 candidates but only paid sufficient fee to register two, leading the National Electoral Committee to register only two candidates. The party disputed the decision and sued, and as a legal remedy, the Supreme Court required the National Electoral Committee to register all 9 candidates on 14 May 2024. Several other parties expressed surprise and disagreement over the decision due to the Greens effectively being able to register all of its candidates without having paid the fee for 7 of them.

=== Debates ===
2024 European Parliament election debates in Estonia
Date	Organisers	P Present N Non-invitee								
Date	Organisers	Reform	SDE	Centre	EKRE	Isamaa	E200	EER	Parempoolsed	Refs
25 April	Postimees	Hanah Lahe	Tanel Kiik	Lauri Laats	Helle-Moonika Helme	N	Irja Lutsar	N	Eero Raun	
11 April	Eesti Televisioon	P Andrus Ansip; Urmas Paet	P Marina Kaljurand; Sven Mikser	P Jana Toom	P Jaak Madison	P Riho Terras	N	N	N	
22 Feb	EGM; ENF	P Hanah Lahe	P Jevgeni Ossinovski	P Erki Savisaar	P Rain Epler	P Jüri Ratas	P Züleyxa Izmailova	N	N	

== Opinion polling ==
The tables below list opinion polling results in reverse chronological order, showing the most recent first and using the dates when the survey fieldwork was done, as opposed to the date of publication. Where the fieldwork dates are unknown, the date of publication is given instead. The seats the result would produce is shown below the result for each party.

Polling execution			Parties										Lead	
Polling firm	Fieldwork date	Sample size	Reform Renew	SDE S&D	Centre Renew	EKRE ID	Isamaa EPP	E200	EER G/EFA	Parem	Koos	Others	Party	EP group
Norstat	8–20 May 2024	1,471	19.1; 1	19.3; 2	11.5; 1	14.2; 1	21.3; 2	3.8; 0	0.9; 0	4.3; 0	2.9; 0	2.7; 0	2.0	4.6
Kantar Emor	6–15 May 2024	1,471	17.2; 2	23.6; 2	11.0; 1	13.6; 1	14.0; 1	4.1; 0	0.9; 0	7.2; 0	3.1; 0	5.4; 0	6.4	9.3
Norstat	29 Apr–6 May 2024	1,484	19.3; 2	21.4; 2	9.4; 1	17.9; 1	17.1; 1	3.9; 0	0.9; 0	4.5; 0	3.0; 0	2.7; 0	2.1	7.3
Kantar Emor	8-17 Apr 2024	1,484	18.8; 2	20; 2	13.8; 1	13.8; 1	16.8; 1	4.7; 0	1.5; 0	6; 0	—	4.5; 0	1.2	12.6
Norstat	11-15 Apr 2024	3,500	20.1; 2	22.0; 2	11.0; 1	17.2; 1	17.6; 1	5.0; 0	1.2; 0	4.7; 0	—	1.2; 0	1.9	9.1
Kantar Emor	14-20 Mar 2024	1,135	18.9; 2	21.4; 2	13.9; 1	15.4; 1	16.7; 1	5.6; 0	— (Note: Included under Others.)	5.9; 0	—	2.1; 0	2.5	11.4
2023 parliamentary election			31.2; 3	9.3; 1	15.3; 1	16.1; 1	8.2; 0	13.3; 1	1.0; 0	2.3; 0	—	3.3; 0	15.1	30.4
2019 EP election			26.2; 2	23.3; 2	14.4; 1	12.7; 1	10.3; 1	3.2; 0	1.8; 0	—	—	8.0; 0	2.9	17.3

European Parliament polling in Estonia is candidate-oriented as opposed to party-oriented due to the short length of the electoral lists.

== Results ==
Party	Votes	%	Seats	+/–
Isamaa	79,170	21.51	2	+1
Social Democratic Party	71,171	19.33	2	0
Estonian Reform Party	66,017	17.93	1	–1
Conservative People's Party of Estonia	54,712	14.86	1	0
Estonian Centre Party	45,767	12.43	1	0
Parempoolsed	25,189	6.84	0	New
Together	11,507	3.13	0	New
Estonia 200	9,584	2.60	0	0
Estonian Greens	2,246	0.61	0	0
Independents	2,763	0.75	0	0
Total	368,126	100.00	7	0
Valid votes	368,126	99.74		
Invalid/blank votes	950	0.26		
Total votes	369,076	100.00		
Registered voters/turnout	980,014	37.66		
Source: VVK

=== European groups ===
Party	Seats	+/–
Renew Europe	2	-1
European People's Party Group	2	+2
Progressive Alliance of Socialists and Democrats	2	0
Patriots for Europe	1	0
Total	7	+1
