= Estonia (European Parliament constituency) =

Constituency of the European Parliament

- European Parliament constituency
- Location among the current constituencies
- Member state: Estonia
- Created: 2004
- MEPs: 6 (2004—2024); 7 (2019—present)

Estonia is a European Parliament constituency for elections in the European Union covering the member state of Estonia. It is currently represented by seven Members of the European Parliament. The elections uses the D'Hondt method with an open list.

== Members of the European Parliament ==
| Election | MEP (party) | MEP (party) | MEP (party) | MEP (party) | MEP (party) | MEP (party) | MEP (party) |
|---|---|---|---|---|---|---|---|
| 2004 | Toomas Hendrik Ilves (SDE) | Tunne Kelam (Pro Patria) | Marianne Mikko (SDE) | Siiri Oviir (Centre) | Toomas Savi (Reform) | Andres Tarand (SDE) | 6 seats 2004–2019 |
| 2007 | Katrin Saks (SDE) | Tunne Kelam (Pro Patria) | Marianne Mikko (SDE) | Siiri Oviir (Centre) | Toomas Savi (Reform) | Andres Tarand (SDE) | 6 seats 2004–2019 |
| 2009 | Ivari Padar (SDE) | Tunne Kelam (Pro Patria) | Vilja Savisaar-Toomast (Centre) | Siiri Oviir (Centre) | Kristiina Ojuland (Reform) | Indrek Tarand (Ind.) | 6 seats 2004–2019 |
| 2014 | Katrin Saks (SDE) | Tunne Kelam (Pro Patria) | Vilja Savisaar-Toomast (Centre) | Siiri Oviir (Centre) | Kristiina Ojuland (Reform) | Indrek Tarand (Ind.) | 6 seats 2004–2019 |
| 2014 | Marju Lauristin (SDE) | Tunne Kelam (Pro Patria) | Urmas Paet (Reform) | Yana Toom (Centre) | Kaja Kallas (Reform) | Indrek Tarand (Ind.) | 6 seats 2004–2019 |
| 2019 | Marina Kaljurand (SDE) | Riho Terras (Isamaa) | Urmas Paet (Reform) | Yana Toom (Centre) | Andrus Ansip (Reform) | Sven Mikser (SDE) | Jaak Madison (EKRE) (Note: 2019-2024) (Centre) (Note: 2024-present) |
| 2024 | Marina Kaljurand (SDE) | Riho Terras (Isamaa) | Urmas Paet (Reform) | Yana Toom (Centre) | Jüri Ratas (Isamaa) | Sven Mikser (SDE) | Jaak Madison (EKRE) (Centre) |

== Elections ==
=== 2004 ===
The 2004 European election was the sixth election to the European Parliament. However, as Estonia had only joined the European Union earlier that month, it was the first election European election held in that state. The election took place on 13 June.

The biggest winner was the Social Democratic Party. The governing Res Publica Party and People's Union polled poorly. The voter turnout in Estonia was one of the lowest of all member countries at only 26.8%. A similar trend was visible in most of the new member states that joined the EU in 2004.

=== 2009 ===
The 2009 European election was the seventh election to the European Parliament and the fourth for Estonia.

=== 2014 ===
The 2014 European election was the eighth election to the European Parliament and the fifth for Estonia.

=== 2019 ===
The 2019 European election was the ninth election to the European Parliament and the sixth for Estonia.

=== 2024 ===
The 2024 European election was the tenth election to the European Parliament and the seventh for Estonia.
