= Jaak Madison =

Estonian politician (born 1991)

Jaak Madison MEP
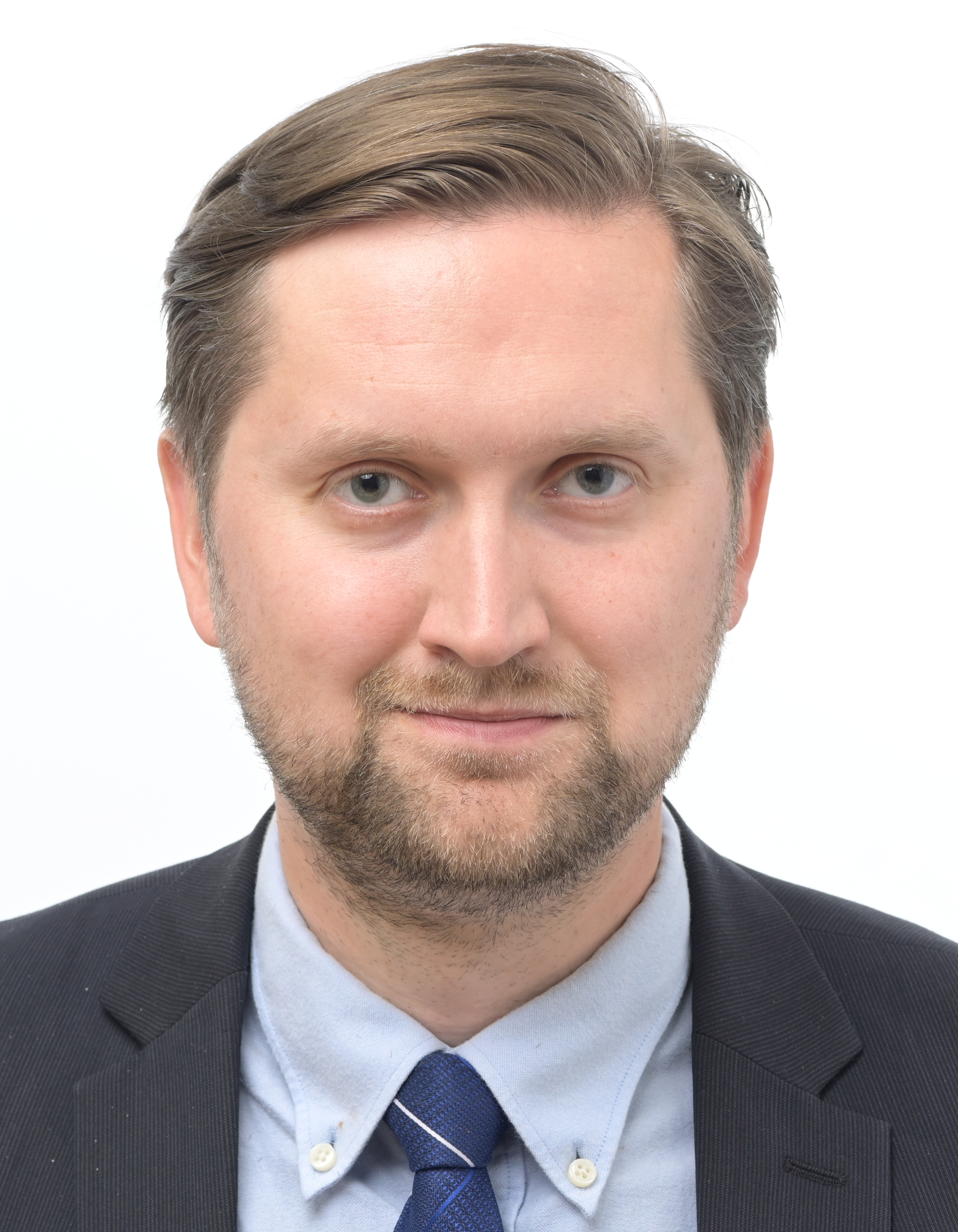
- Official portrait, 2024

Member of the European Parliament for Estonia
- Incumbent
- Assumed office 2 July 2019

Member of the Riigikogu
- In office 30 March 2015 – 12 June 2019

Personal details
- Born: 22 April 1991 (age 35) Järva Parish, Estonia
- Party: KE (2024–present)
- Other political affiliations: EKRE (2013–2024)
- Children: 1
- Education: University of Tartu

Jaak Madison (born 22 April 1991) is an Estonian politician and a member of the European Parliament, where he is a member of the Committee on Foreign Affairs and the Committee on International Trade. He was member and deputy chairman of the Conservative People's Party of Estonia until leaving the party in June 2024 and joining Estonian Centre Party.

Madison was first elected to the Riigikogu in 2015 election with 1,883 votes. In April 2017, he was elected as the deputy chairman of the EKRE party. In 2019 he was elected as a Member of the European Parliament with 22 819 votes. He was reelected on the EKRE list in 2024 with 32,868 votes. Despite promising to stay in the Identity and Democracy group of the European Parliament on 1 July 2024, he left ID and joined European Conservatives and Reformists on 4 July 2024.

Madison has a Bachelor of Laws degree, completed in 2023 at the Faculty of Law at University of Tartu.

== Political positions ==
=== European Union ===
Madison has said that the European Union should return to its original form, that of a union for economic and trade cooperation between sovereign states. He has said that a federalized European Union is the greatest threat to nation states.

Madison has claimed that the European Union is already on its way to becoming a federal state, as member states lack many of the features of an independent state.

Madison has opposed the idea of a European Union Minister for Finance, saying that issues such as the government budget and immigration must be left to the member states. He has argued against qualified majority voting, saying that it deprives smaller countries of decision-making power on issues.

=== Foreign policy and border agreement with Russia ===
Madison has said Estonia must withdraw from the border agreement between Estonia and Russia and start new talks on the basis of the Treaty of Tartu. In 2018, Madison said that if the border treaty is ratified under the current conditions, Russia could claim that the Treaty of Tartu is no longer legally valid.

He has opposed defense cooperation and security policy with France or Germany, and in favour of cooperation with the other Baltic states, Poland, Hungary, the United States and Finland.

In 2018, in the foreign policy magazine Diplomaatia, Madison named supporting and keeping in touch with Estonian communities abroad as a key issue for the survival of Estonia, which should not be compromised for realpolitical reasons. Madison also took this view on the issue of Estonians in Crimea, arguing that the occupation of Crimea by Russia must not mean that Estonia no longer supports Estonians living there. He stated that Estonia must pursue a value-based foreign policy, which means that any Estonian living anywhere in the world is important to Estonia and we should do everything in our power to keep their ties with Estonia.

=== Immigration and citizenship ===
Madison believes that mass immigration does not affect Estonia.

In January 2019, he said that a low immigration quota (up to 1300 people a year) was not a problem because there was free movement of labor in the European Union and an increase in the immigration quota would be only for cheap labor, which would lower local wages. Madison supports not having a quota for highly skilled workers who earn triple the average wage.

In 2018, he expressed the view that those with an Estonian alien's passport who have lived in Estonia since 1991 should be given five years to decide what citizenship they want. Those who do not acquire Estonian citizenship during this period would have their residence permit revoked.

=== Social issues ===
Madison is against the legalization of same-sex cohabitation, the right of same-sex couples to adopt, national facilitation of gender reassignment and abortion outside of certain cases.

He supports the reinstatement of the death penalty for serious crimes and believes surrogacy should be made illegal.

== Controversy ==
=== Blog posts ===
In March 2015, media reported about Madison's blog post which defended the economic aspects of the Nazi regime. He had written: "It is true that there were concentration camps, forced labour camps, games with gas chambers were being played, but at the same time such a 'strict' order brought Germany at the time out of a thorough shithole, because development, that admittedly concentrated primarily on the development of the military industry, brought the country only within a couple of years to one of the most powerful in Europe."

His blog post further claimed that while Madison did not seek to justify Nazi mass murders, he nonetheless felt that the Holocaust had 'positive aspects'. The media also cited his comments from spring 2014 that "It is unfortunately a fact that only now it is being more widely understood and recognized that a national purification is needed, that would create premises that exactly those pro-Estonian ones would gain superiority among the Russians". This was largely condemned by the public and the Reform Party, which left EKRE out of the coalition talks. Estonian prime minister Taavi Rõivas pointed out it was causing him grief that a young politician justified Nazism, which had caused so much suffering to people, and wondered whether sugarcoating fascism and ridiculing crimes against humanity was a general line of Madison's party.

Israel's Foreign Ministry told the European Parliament's Subcommittee on Human Rights that it did not want to meet with them, as the subcommittee's member Jaak Madison shares pro-Nazi views, Postimees reported, citing the Jerusalem Post.

The Israeli Foreign Ministry notified the European Parliament Subcommittee on Human Rights that it would not meet with the group because it includes Estonian lawmaker Jaak Madison, leading to the trip's cancelation.

=== Incidents ===
Madison raised controversy again later in March, when he was fined for retaining a passenger's lost smartphone, which he should have placed in "lost and found" and selling it online while working for ferry company Tallink. In April, some female workers of Tallink also accused Madison of sexual harassment and sexual assault. Tallink launched an internal investigation of the incidents, whilst Madison called the accusations absurd.

In April 2024, a 25-year-old Estonian European Commission intern accused Madison of conduct which frightened and insulted her during a night in March. The offense report includes the words "agression sexuelles" (French for sexual aggression) and reads under other circumstances: "Mental trauma and fear caused by a chance encounter." Madison denies the accusations and has said that he will seek damages in court from a woman who accused him of sexual harassment and from newspaper Eesti Ekspress for running the story.

=== Views ===
Madison holds national-conservative views. He has labelled gay people as deviants. In May 2019, during an interview with The Guardian, he did not disown his earlier views from 2015 about praising the "positive aspects" Nazi Germany, his explanation being that "pushing people to camps was wrong" but the unemployment rate "was low".

In August 2019, Madison used the term "Final Solution" within the context of Syrian refugees, using the German phrase Die endgültige Lösung ist erforderlich. The same phrase was used in Nazi Germany, which caused the action to make headlines. Madison justified the saying, claiming he does not want the Holocaust or concentration camps but an end to the refugee crisis.
