= Irja Lutsar =

Estonian microbiologist, virologist

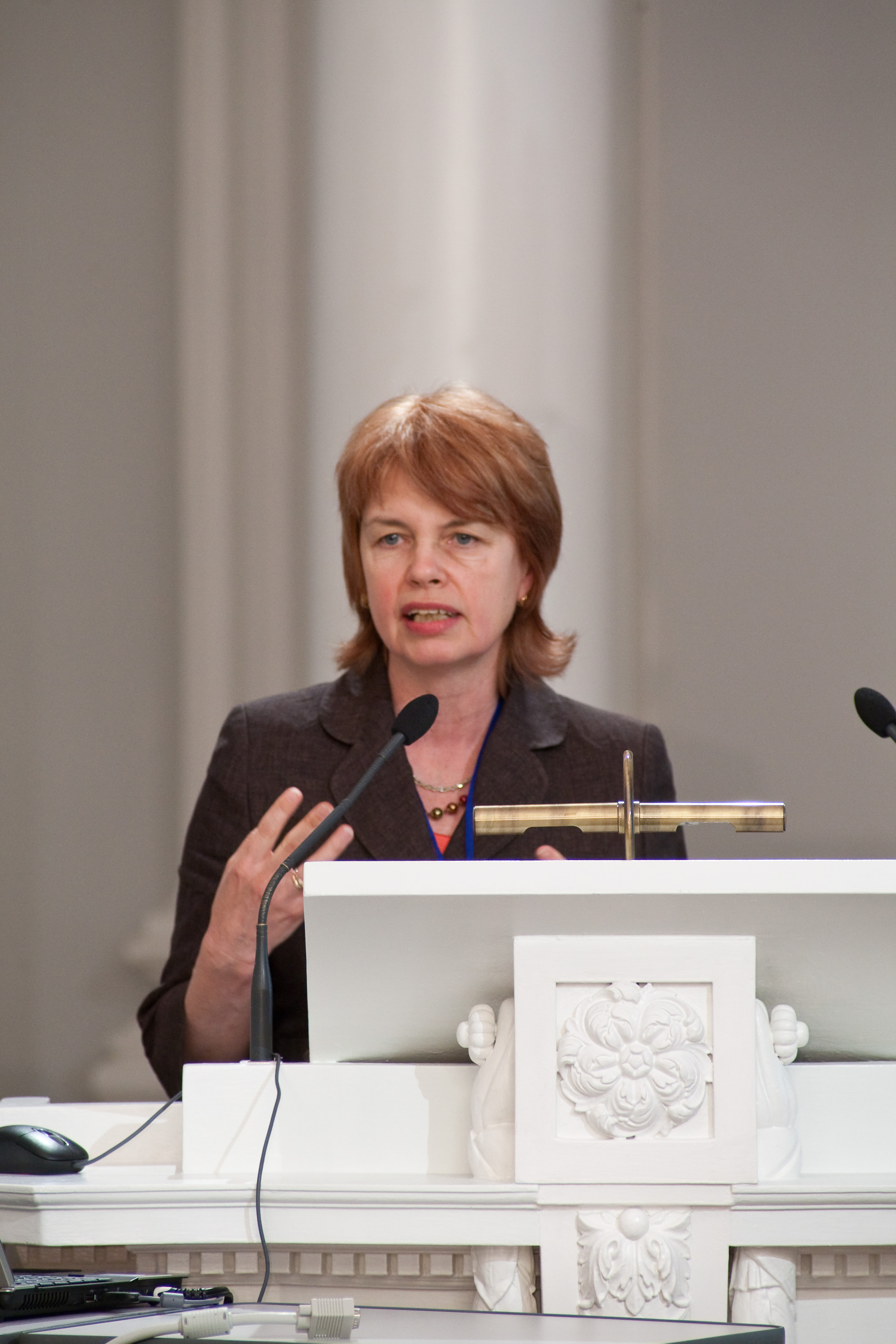
Irja Lutsar

Irja Lutsar (born 20 July 1954 in Räpina) is an Estonian microbiologist, virologist politician, and professor of medical microbiology and virology at the University of Tartu and a member of the XV Riigikogu. Her research is related to the pathogenesis and treatment of infectious diseases in immunocompromised individuals – mainly newborns and HIV-positive individuals.

From 2004 to 2015, she headed the Institute of Microbiology, Faculty of Medicine, University of Tartu. Since 2016, she has been the head of the microbiology department of the Institute of Bio and Transplantation Medicine in the field of medical sciences at the University of Tartu. From 20 March 2020 to 31 December 2021, she was the head of the scientific advisory board of the government commission dealing with the events related to the COVID-19 pandemic, as well as solving public health and economic problems.

In the autumn of 2022, Lutsar joined the Estonia 200 party and ran for election to the Riigikogu during the 2023 Estonian parliamentary election. She collected 3,523 votes in electoral district No. 9 (Jõgeva and Tartu County, excluding the city of Tartu) and was elected.
