= Together (Estonian political party) =

Political party in Estonia

Together Koos Вместе
- Leader: Igor Hopp; Margus Liiva; Eduard Fedotov
- Founder: Aivo Peterson
- Founded: 19 May 2022
- Legalized: 8 May 2023
- Membership (2024): 784
- Ideology: Social conservatism Russian minority politics Russophilia; Non-interventionism
- Riigikogu: 0 / 101
- European Parliament: 0 / 7
- Municipalities: 3 / 1,688

Original logo

Together (Estonian: Koos, Russian: Вместе), officially known as TOGETHER Party (Estonian: KOOS Erakond) and previously known as TOGETHER organization points to sovereignty (Estonian: KOOS organisatsioon osutab suveräänsusele) and Party of Estonian Patriots TOGETHER (Estonian: Eesti Patriootide Erakond KOOS; Russian: Партия патриотов Эстонии ВМЕСТЕ), is a Russian-minority, pro-Russia political party in Estonia. According to the party, its main goal is to ensure peace in Estonia and harmonious relations among peoples. It was led by Aivo Peterson and cryptocurrency businessman Oleg Ivanov, who was on the list of the Estonian United Left Party for the 2023 parliamentary election. On 19 May 2023, Ivanov announced that he was moving to Russia to lead the party from there out of fear of detention by the Estonian Internal Security Service.

== History ==
The non-profit association Koos Rahu Eest in Eesti is registered with the movement. On 24 April 2022, Ivanov posted a video in which he called the Bucha massacre staged. He said, "Estonia is destined to be destroyed in the war with Russia. The allies are fighting Russia with the hands of their vassal states, and not directly. According to the plans of the allies, Estonia will be destroyed. Everything is being done so that the Baltic states become the next hotbed of war. The same criminals who brought the masses to syringes are now pushing countries to go to war with Russia."

Ivanov appeared on a November 2022 program hosted by Russian and pro-Kremlin TV presenter Vladimir Solovyov, where he said that Estonia should be open to negotiations and escalation" did not bode well: "Our main message is peace and inter-ethnic harmony in Estonia." Danish Radio (DR) quoted him as saying, "I know that Putin launched a military operation. But I also know that if Putin had not done it, the Ukrainian army would have attacked Donbas within days".

On 30 November 2022, the Tartu County Court registry department did not register the movement as a political party because its membership was below the required minimum of 500. The movement participated in the 2023 elections as part of the Estonian United Left Party. In January 2023, the movement held a prayer service "for peace" with the Estonian Orthodox Church of the Moscow Patriarchate.

In March 2023, party leader Aivo Peterson was detained by Estonian border police on his return from Russia, where he had gone after traveling to Ukrainian occupied territories to film videos in support of the Russian invasion of Ukraine. Peterson and two others were charged under Section 235(1) of the Estonian penal code, which prohibits associations from pursuing relationships considered harmful to the Estonian state. Together was registered as a political party on 8 May of that year. Ivanov left Estonia for Russia by 19 May, saying that he did so because he could be arrested by Estonian police as Peterson had, and it would be difficult to lead the party and participate in elections from prison.

On 22 May 2023, the daily newspaper Õhtuleht reported that the party might have no members due to the possibility that it registered its members incorrectly. In July, the daily Eesti Ekspress published an article confirming that the party's new leader was Julia Smoli because Peterson was detained and Ivanov was in Russia. On 7 September, the State Prosecutor's Office charged Peterson with treason.

On 11 December 2025, Peterson and Dimitri Roosti were convicted of treason and sentenced to 14 years and 11 years in prison, respectively. Russian citizen Andrei Andronov was convicted of nonviolent activities directed against the Republic of Estonia and was sentenced to 11 years in prison, however, because he committed the offense while on probation, the court added his previous unserved sentence, resulting in a total prison term of 11 years, 5 months and 23 days.

On 17 April 2026, Peterson's sentence was extended by two years, bringing his total sentence to 16 years in prison, while Rootsi's was reduced by one year to a total of 10 years.

On 18 November 2026, the party distanced itself from association with Peterson's positions, claiming "it must be understood that Aivo Peterson's personal statements should not automatically be considered the official position of the Together Party".

== Programme ==
The movement supports Estonian neutrality, the country's non-participation in military alliances such as NATO, granting Estonian citizenship to all who lived there in 1991, and abolishing the "gray passport" for residents with undefined citizenship. It also supports the "preservation and protection of traditional values, family, religion, cultural and historical heritage ... a ban on rewriting history and destroying monuments, and a requirement that defense spending not exceed one percent of gross domestic product."

== Election results ==
=== European Parliament elections ===
Election	List leader	Votes	%	Seats	+/−	EP Group
2024	Aivo Peterson	11,507	3.13 (#7)	0 / 7	New	−
