= Hanah Lahe =

Estonian climate activist and politician

Member of the XV Riigikogu

Personal details
- Born: 8 July 1999 (age 27) Haapsalu, Estonia
- Party: Estonian Reform Party
- Education: Estonian University of Life Sciences (MSc)
- Occupation: Politician, Member of the XV Riigikogu, climate activist

Hanah Lahe (born 8 July 1999) is an Estonian politician, Member of the XV Riigikogu and climate activist.

== Political Activity ==
In the 2023 Riigikogu elections, she received 1050 votes in the electoral district No. 1 (Tallinn's Haabersti, Põhja-Tallinn, and Kristiine districts). Lahe entered the Riigikogu as a substitute for Kristen Michal, who became the Minister of Climate Affairs.

In the 2024 European Parliament elections she received 3330 votes.

In the 2021 local elections, Lahe received 187 votes in constituency 3 (Kristiine).

In Riigikogu, she is a member of the Committee of Environment and until 2025 was also a member of the Committee of European Affairs. She advocates for ambitious climate policy, circular economy, women's rights and youth involvement in politics.

In 2023 she founded the Circular Economy Support Group in Riigikogu and since 2025 is chairing the Youth Participation Support Group and Youth Mental Health Support Group.

She was the chairman of the environment committee of the Kristiine city council, and an expert on the environment and climate committee of the Tallinn City Council. For two years, she chaired the Environmental Committee of the Reform Party's Youth.

== Career ==
In 2018-2021 Lahe worked in banking and real estate. In 2021-2022 she worked in the Reform Party's office as a campaign advisor and as an advisor to the First Vice-President of the Riigikogu Hanno Pevkur, in 2022-2023 she worked as an advisor to the Reform Party Fraction in Riigikogu.

== Education and Civic Activism ==
In 2024, Lahe obtained a Master's degree in Master of Environmental Management and Policy from Estonian University of Life Sciences and wrote her thesis on the planned Climate Act in Estonia.

In 2022, Lahe obtained a Bachelor's degree in Administration and Business Administration from Tallinn University and wrote her thesis on Estonia's climate policy developments from 2010 to 2020. In 2018 she graduated from the Economics Class of Läänemaa Gymnasium.

In 2022, she was Estonia's Youth Climate Delegate for COP27.

In 2025, Lahe was nominated for European of the Year award in Estonia by the European Commission Representation in Estonia.
