= Tanel Talve =

Estonian politician

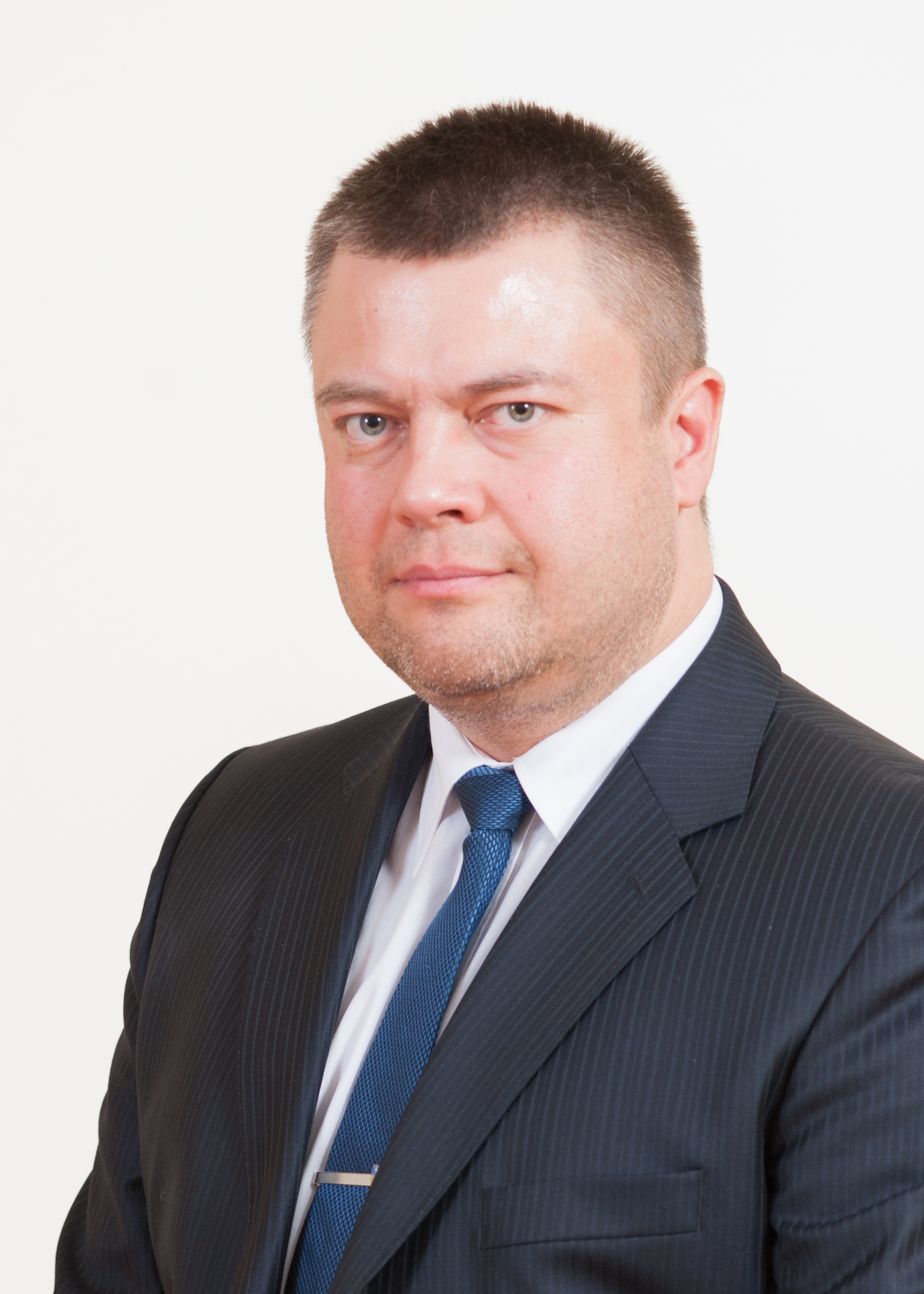

Tanel Talve (born 13 August 1976 in Tallinn) is an Estonian journalist, radio and television presenter and politician. He was a member of the XIII Riigikogu.

In 2016 he graduated from University of Tartu's Pärnu College specializing in tourism and hotel management.

From 1994 to 2004 he worked at Estonian Radio, being editor, presenter and reporter. From 2004 to 2019 he worked at television channel Kanal 2, being a presenter and reporter for the news program Reporter, the presenter of the popular science program Galileo and the producer, cameraman, director and presenter of the travel program Motoreporter.

Since 2015 he has been a member of the Estonian Social Democratic Party.
