= 2019 European Parliament election in Estonia =

← 2014	26 May 2019	2024 →

All 6 Estonian seats to the European Parliament (+1 when the new apportionment was implemented)
- Turnout: 37.6% (▲1.1pp)
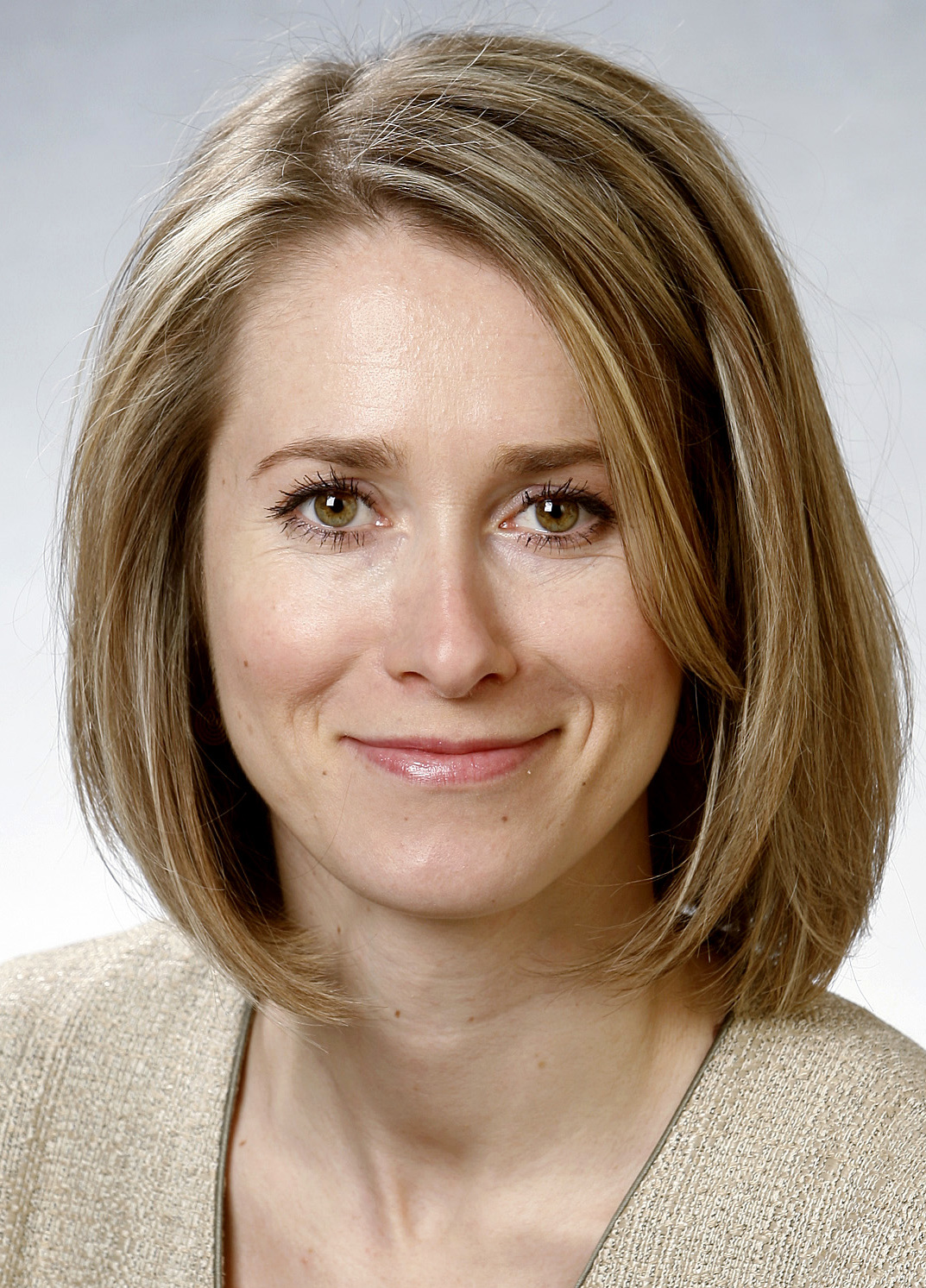

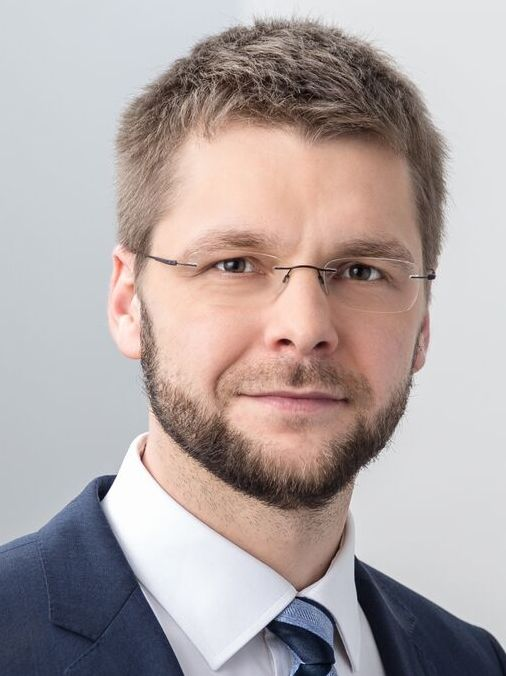

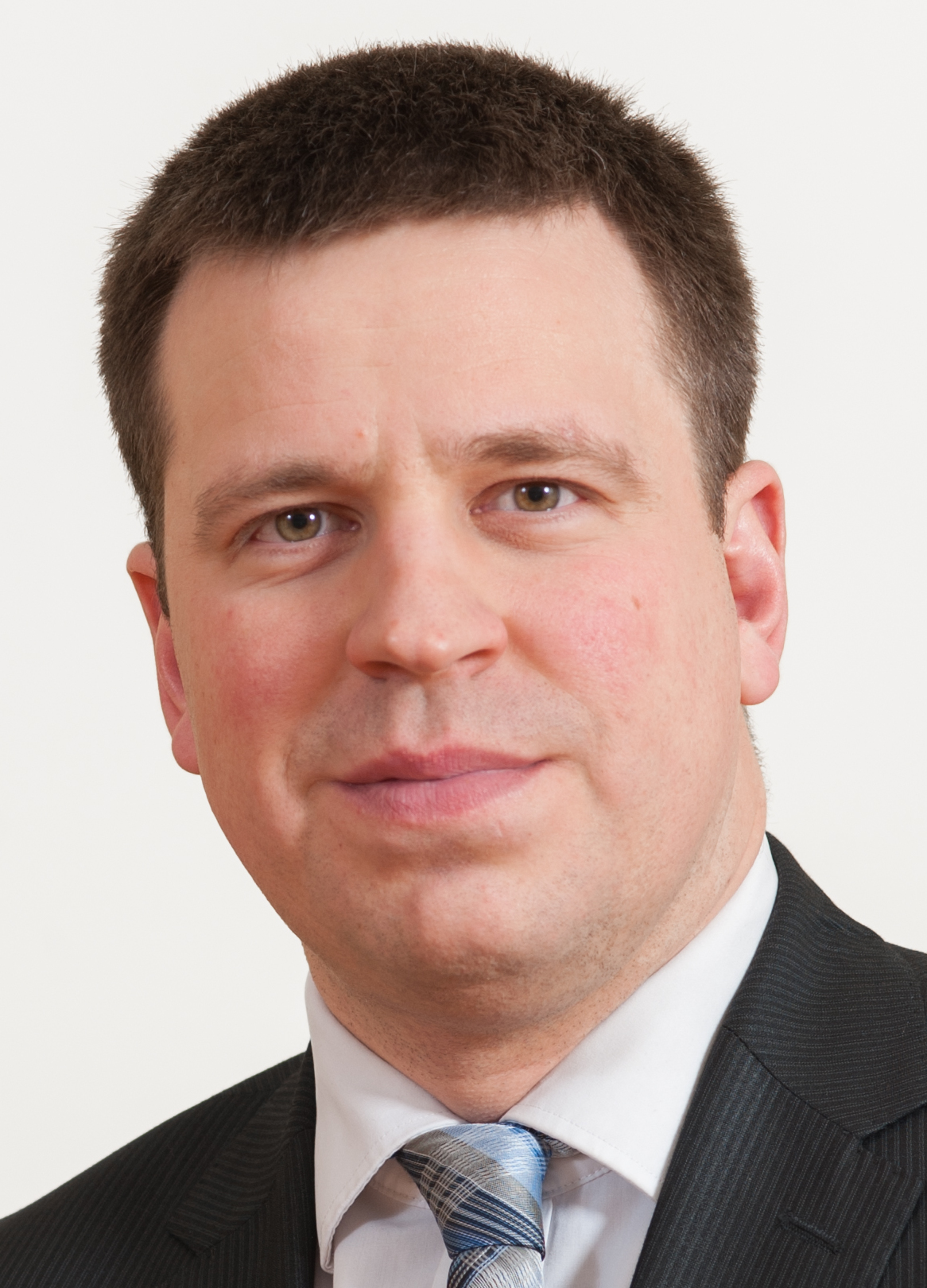

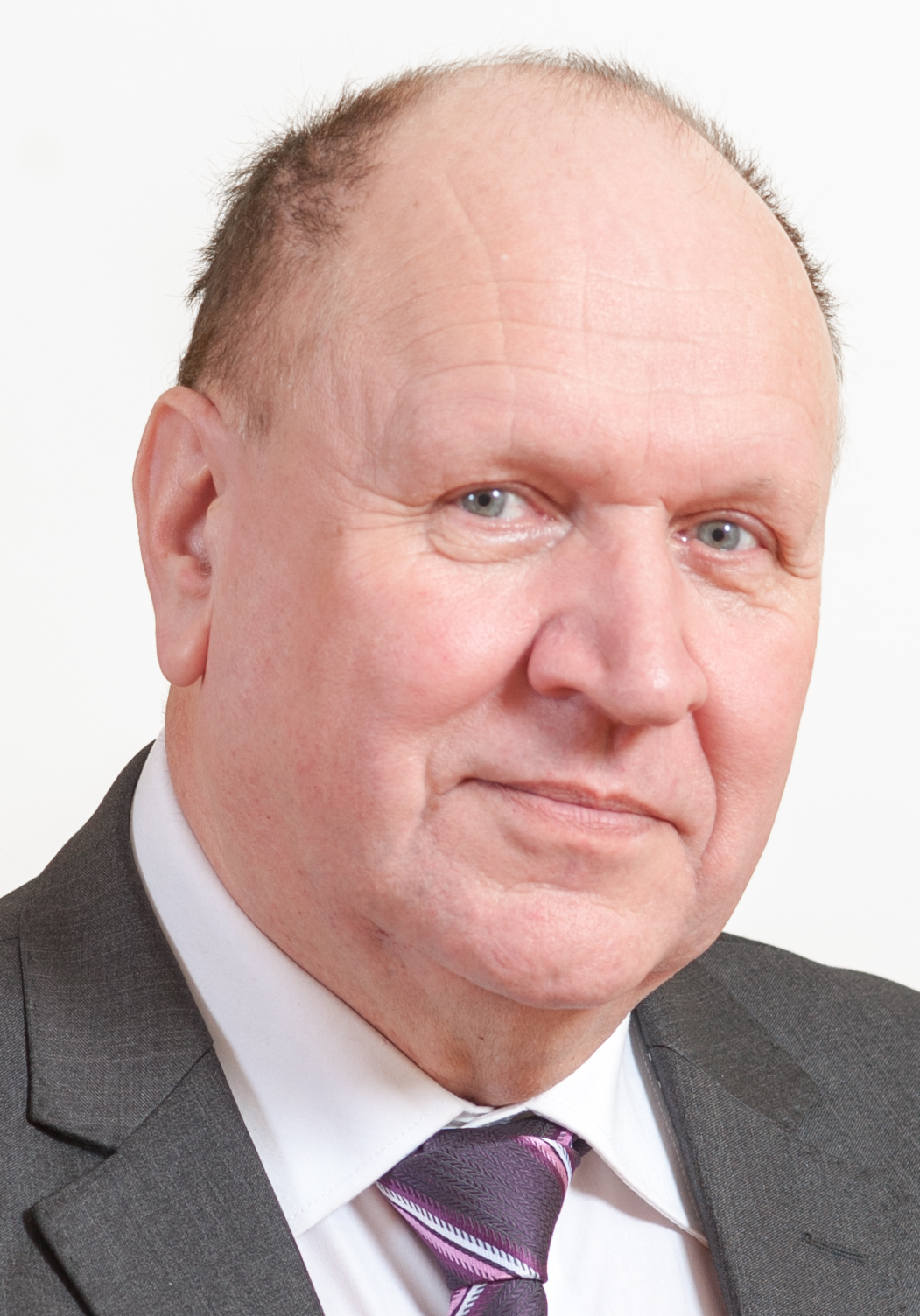

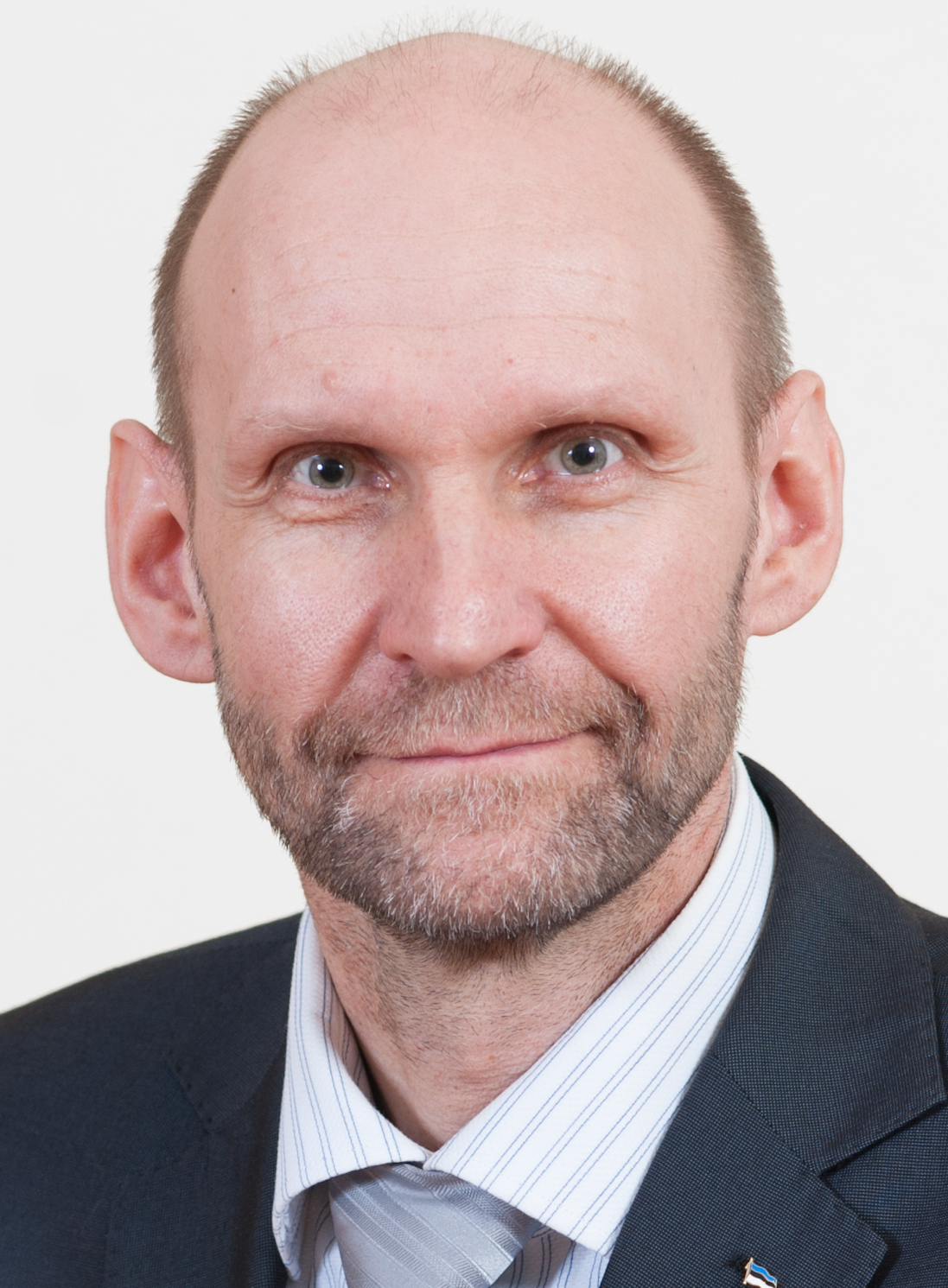
	First party	Second party	Third party
Leader	Kaja Kallas	Jevgeni Ossinovski	Jüri Ratas
Party	Reform	SDE	Centre
Alliance	ALDE	PES	ALDE
Last election	2 seats, 24.3%	1 seat, 13.6%	1 seat, 22.4%
Seats won	2	2	1
Seat change	Steady	▲1	Steady
Popular vote	87,158	77,384	47,819
Percentage	26.2%	23.3%	14.4%
Swing	▲1.9	▲9.7	▼8.0
	Fourth party	Fifth party
Leader	Mart Helme	Helir-Valdor Seeder
Party	EKRE	Isamaa
Alliance	EAPN	EPP
Last election	0 seats, 4.0%	1 seat, 13.9%
Seats won	1	0 (+1 when the new apportionment was implemented)
Seat change	▲1	▼1
Popular vote	42,268	34,189
Percentage	12.7%	10.3%
Swing	▲8.7	▼3.6
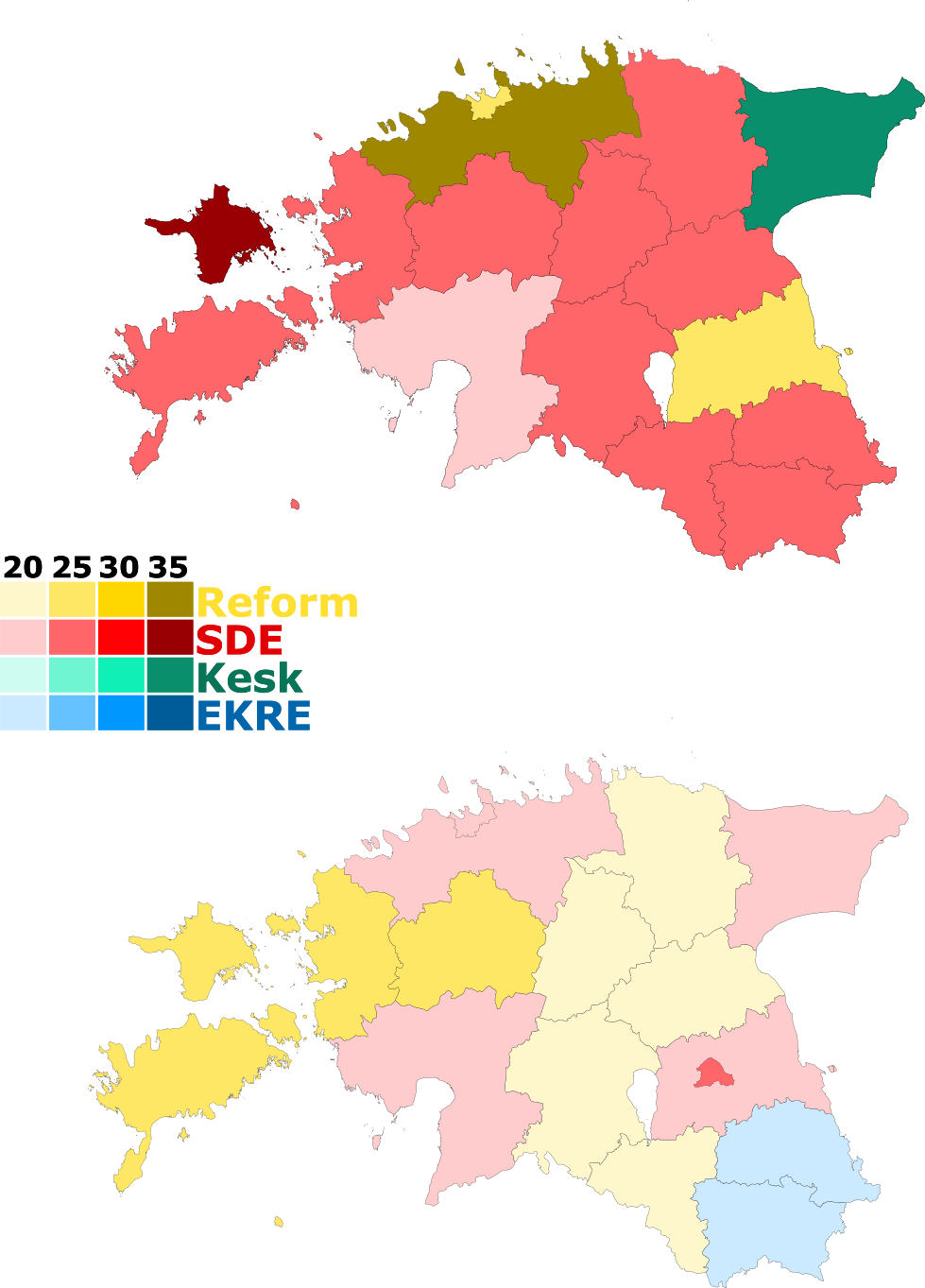
- Vote Share in the 2019 European Parliament election in Estonia by most voted (top) and second most voted (bottom) party per county.

An election for the Members of the European Parliament from Estonia took place on May 26, 2019. Due to the United Kingdom's impending withdrawal from the European Union and the redistribution of its European Parliament seats, the number of elected MEPs from Estonia was increased from six to seven.

== Opinion polls ==
Poll results are listed in the table below in reverse chronological order, showing the most recent first. The highest percentage figure in each poll is displayed in bold, and the background shaded in the leading party's color. In the instance that there is a tie, then no figure is shaded.

Date	Sample size	Polling firm	Ref	Kesk	I	SDE	Ind.	EKRE	Green	E200	Others
5–18 March 2019	1,004	Turu-uuringute AS	**30**	22	11	8	–	18	–	4	7
7–20 Feb 2019	4,716	Turu-uuringute AS	**28**	**28**	7	7	–	15	–	6	9
January 2019	1,000	Turu-uuringute AS	26	**32**	5	6	–	13	–	6	15
November 2018	1,055	Kantar Emor	**25**	22	5	6	11	17	3	9	2
24 May 2014	–	Election Results	**24.3**	22.4	13.9	13.6	13.2	4.0	0.3	–	8.4
24 May 2014	–	Election Results	**2**	1	1	1	1	0	0		

== Results ==
Party	Votes	%	Seats	+/–
Estonian Reform Party	87,160	26.24	2	0
Social Democratic Party	77,375	23.30	2	+1
Estonian Centre Party	47,799	14.39	1	0
Conservative People's Party of Estonia	42,265	12.73	1	+1
Isamaa	34,188	10.29	0	–1
Estonia 200	10,700	3.22	0	New
Estonian Greens	5,824	1.75	0	0
Estonian Biodiversity Party	2,951	0.89	0	New
Estonian United Left Party	221	0.07	0	0
Independents	23,621	7.11	0	–1
**Total**	**332,104**	**100.00**	**6**	**0**
Valid votes	332,104	99.77		
Invalid/blank votes	755	0.23		
Total votes	**332,859**	**100.00**		
Registered voters/turnout	885,417	37.59		
Source: VVK

=== Elected MEPs ===
Party	Name
Ref	Andrus Ansip
Ref	Urmas Paet
SDE	Marina Kaljurand
SDE	Sven Mikser
Kesk	Yana Toom
EKRE	Jaak Madison
I	Riho Terras (after Brexit on 2020-02-01)
