= Lauri Laats =

Estonian politician and entrepreneur

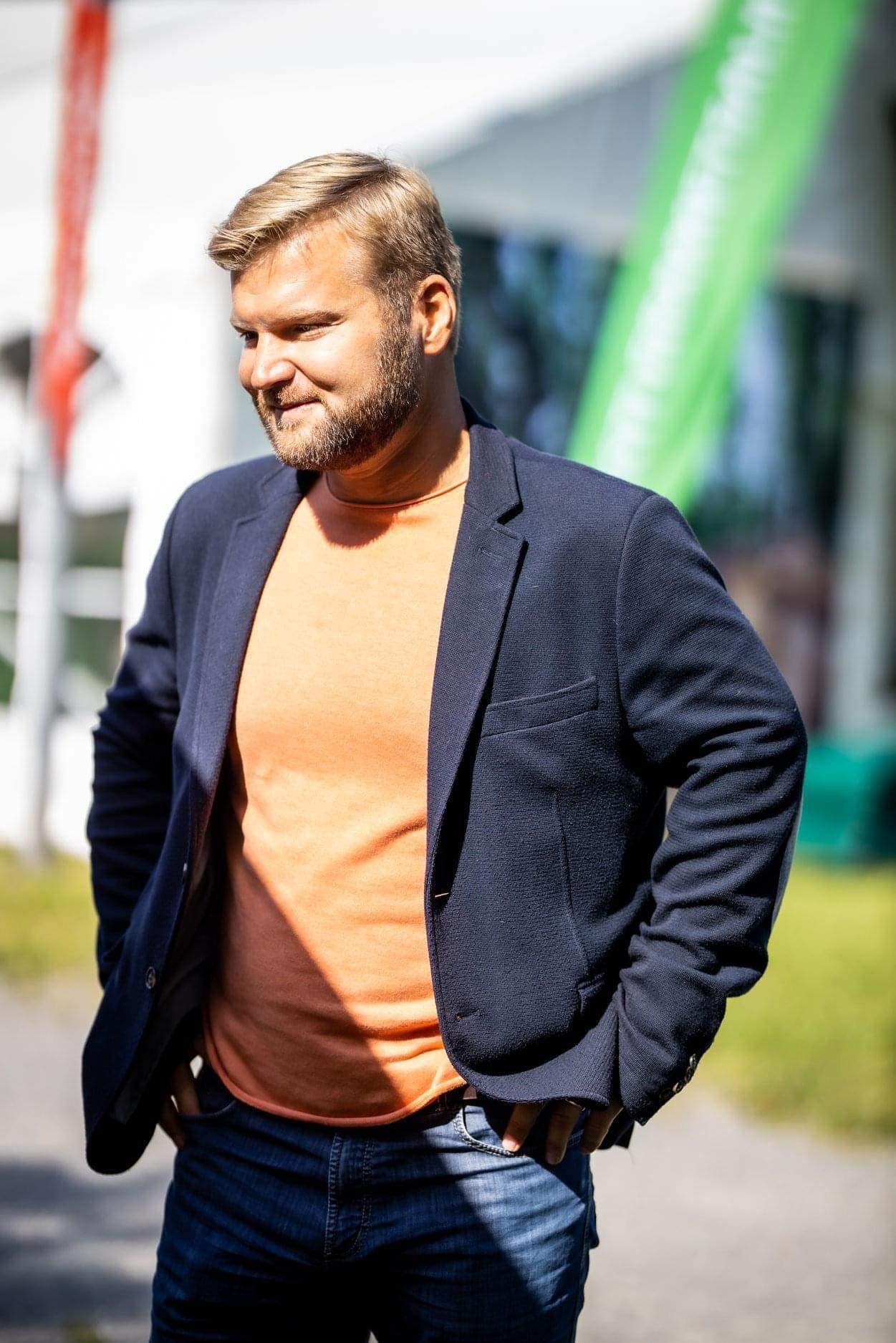
Lauri Laats

Lauri Laats (born 22 April 1981) is an Estonian politician and entrepreneur. In 2023, he was elected to the XV Riigikogu, representing the Estonian Centre Party.
