= Elections in Estonia =

Estonia elects a legislature on the national level. The Riigikogu has 101 members, elected for a four-year term by proportional representation with a 5% electoral threshold. A head of state – the president – is elected for a five-year term by parliament (1st–3rd round) or an electoral college (4th and subsequent rounds). Locally, Estonia elects local government councils, which vary in size. Election law states the minimum size of a council depending on the size of municipality. Local government councils are elected by proportional representation too.

- The minimum number of council members is prescribed to be at least 7 seats
- Over 2,000 inhabitants: at least 13 seats
- Over 5,000 inhabitants: at least 17 seats
- Over 10,000 inhabitants: at least 21 seats
- Over 50,000 inhabitants: at least 31 seats
- Over 300,000 inhabitants: at least 79 seats

Estonia has a multi-party system with numerous parties. Often no one party has the chance to gain power alone and parties must work with each other to form coalition governments.

Direct elections have taken place in the following years:

- Riigikogu (parliament): 1920, 1923, 1926, 1929, 1932, 1936, 1938, 1940, 1992, 1995, 1999, 2003, 2007, 2011, 2015, 2019, 2023
- Local/municipal: 1993, 1996, 1999, 2002, 2005, 2009, 2013, 2017, 2021, 2025
- European parliament: 2004, 2009, 2014, 2019, 2024
- Referendums: 2003 (EU)
- President: 1992 (Presidential elections since 1996 have taken place in Riigikogu or Electoral College)

== Voting ==
Residents without Estonian citizenship may not elect the Riigikogu (the national parliament). Residents without citizenship of any European Union member state may not elect the European Parliament nor municipal councils.

Foreign citizens were eligible to vote in the local (municipal) elections in Estonia up until 2025, last eligible elections being 2021 municipal elections. Stateless residents, or so-called “non-citizens” holding Estonian alien's passport are eligible to vote up until 2025 municipal elections, but not after.

Estonia has a system of online voting, allowing votes to be cast through the Internet; online voting in Estonia is based on the Estonian ID card. Every voter has the right to verify and change their vote electronically. If the voter has also voted with a ballot paper, then only the ballot paper will be taken into account.

== Latest parliamentary election ==
| Party | Votes | % | +/– | Seats | +/– |
|---|---|---|---|---|---|
| Estonian Reform Party | 190,632 | 31.24 | +2.31 | 37 | +3 |
| Conservative People's Party of Estonia | 97,966 | 16.05 | −1.71 | 17 | −2 |
| Estonian Centre Party | 93,254 | 15.28 | −7.82 | 16 | −10 |
| Estonia 200 | 81,329 | 13.33 | +8.97 | 14 | +14 |
| Social Democratic Party | 56,584 | 9.27 | −0.56 | 9 | −1 |
| Isamaa | 50,118 | 8.21 | −3.23 | 8 | −4 |
| Estonian United Left Party | 14,605 | 2.39 | +2.30 | 0 | 0 |
| Parempoolsed | 14,037 | 2.30 | New | 0 | New |
| Estonian Greens | 5,886 | 0.96 | −0.86 | 0 | 0 |
| Independents | 5,888 | 0.96 | +0.68 | 0 | 0 |
| Total | 610,299 | 100.00 | – | 101 | 0 |
| Valid votes | 610,299 | 99.43 | | | |
| Invalid/blank votes | 3,502 | 0.57 | | | |
| Total votes | 613,801 | 100.00 | | | |
| Registered voters/turnout | 966,129 | 63.53 | | | |
Source: National Electoral Committee

== European elections ==
- European Parliament election, 2004
- European Parliament election, 2009
- European Parliament election, 2014
- European Parliament election, 2019
- European Parliament election, 2024

== Referendums ==
The Constitution of Estonia gives the Parliament of Estonia the power to submit a bill or other national issue to a referendum (article 105 of the Constitution). The result of the vote is binding. If a bill which is submitted to a referendum does not receive a majority of votes in favour, the President of the Republic shall declare extraordinary elections to the Parliament.

There are some issues which cannot be submitted to the referendum: issues regarding the budget, taxation, financial obligations of the state, ratification and denunciation of international treaties, the declaration or termination of a state of emergency, or national defence (article 105 of the Constitution).

Some parts of the Constitution (chapters "General Provisions" and "Amendment of the Constitution") can be amended only by a referendum (article 162 of the Constitution). The rest of Constitution can be amended either by

- a referendum;
- two successive memberships of the Parliament;
- the Parliament, as a matter of urgency (article 163 of the Constitution).

A three-fifths majority of the membership of the Parliament is required to submit a bill to amend the Constitution to a referendum (article 164 of the Constitution).

A referendum was called by the Parliament of Estonia on 2 occasions since Estonia regained independence from the USSR.

- a referendum on a new constitution and citizenship in 1992
- Estonian European Union membership referendum in 2003

Also, there was a referendum on the restoration of Estonian independence in 1991 while Estonia was still under Soviet occupation.

== See also ==
- Electoral districts of Estonia
- Electoral calendar
- Electoral system
- Electronic voting in Estonia
