= Politics of Estonia =

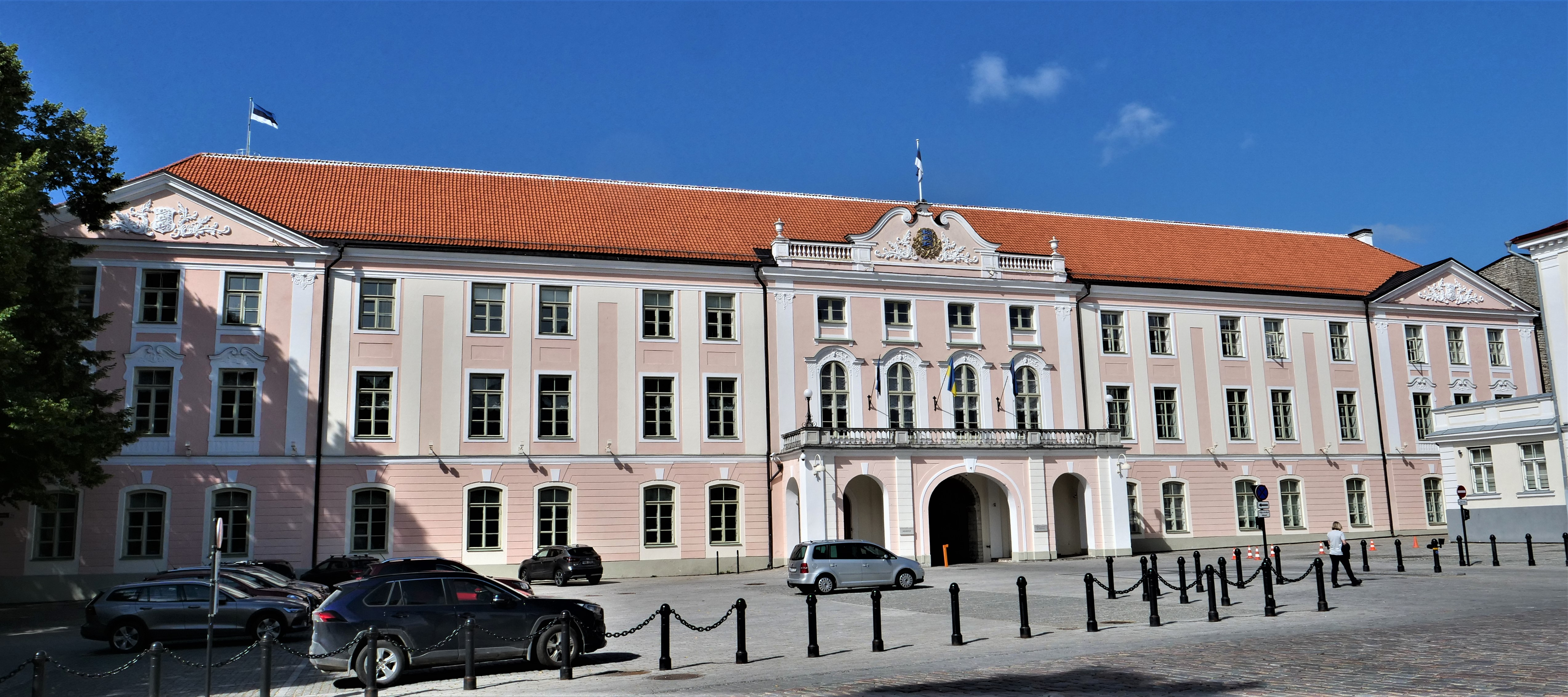
Estnisches Parlament Domberg

Politics in Estonia takes place in a framework of a parliamentary representative democratic republic, whereby the Prime Minister of Estonia is the head of government, and of a multi-party system. Legislative power is vested in the Estonian parliament. Executive power is exercised by the government, which is led by the prime minister. The judiciary is independent of the executive and the legislature. Estonia is a member of the United Nations, the European Union, and NATO.

== History ==
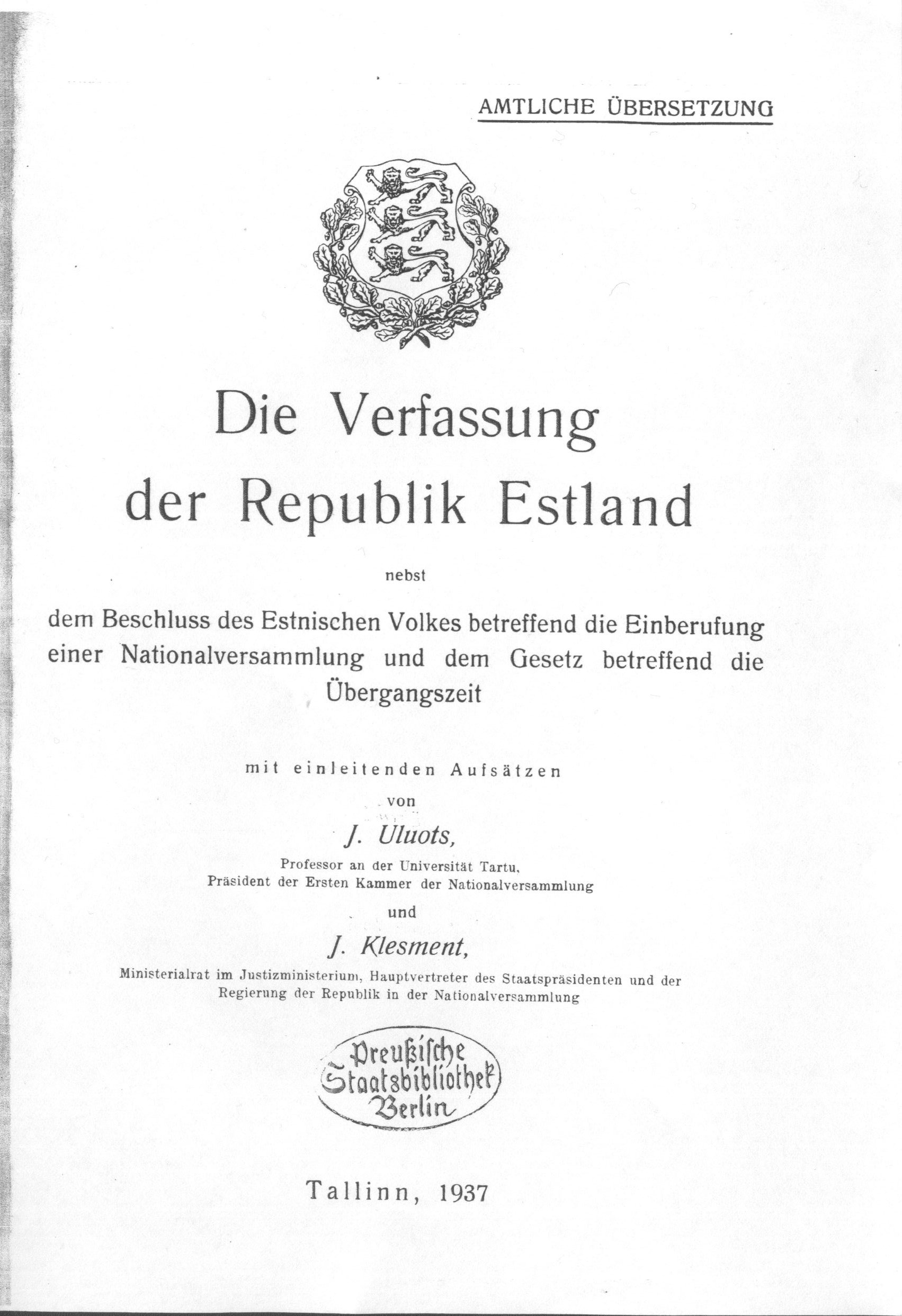
German translation of the Constitution of the Republic of Estonia

The Estonian Declaration of Independence was issued on 21 February 1918. A parliamentary republic was formed by the Estonian Constituent Assembly and the first Constitution of Estonia was adopted on 15 June 1920. The Parliament of Estonia (State Assembly) elected a Riigivanem who acted both as Head of Government and Head of State. During the Era of Silence, political parties were banned and the parliament was not in session between 1934 and 1938 because the country was ruled by decree of Konstantin Päts, who was elected as the first President of Estonia in 1938. In 1938 a new constitution was passed and the Parliament of Estonia was convened once again, this time bicamerally, consisting of Riigivolikogu (lower house) and Riiginõukogu (upper house), both meaning State Council in direct translation. In 1940, Estonia was occupied by the Soviet Union. It was soon followed by the German occupation of 1941–1944. During the course of the two occupations, legal institutions, elected according to the Estonian constitution, were removed from power. In September 1944, after German forces left, legal power was briefly restored, as Otto Tief formed a new government in accordance with the 1938 constitution. The Tief government lasted for only five days, as Estonia was again occupied by the Soviet Union. Estonia declared restoration of independence in 1991 as the Republic of Estonia on the basis of continuity of the constitution prior to 1938, putting into motion the transition from a state socialist economy to a capitalist market economy; in 1992, the public approved a new constitution. On 1 May 2004, Estonia was accepted into the European Union. On 1 January 2011, Estonia joined the eurozone and adopted the EU single currency as the first former Soviet Union state.

=== Recent political developments ===
The leader of the Reform Party Andrus Ansip was the Prime Minister of Estonia from 2005 until 2014. By the end of his nine-year tenure he was the longest-serving prime minister in the European Union. In August 2011, President of Estonia Toomas Hendrik Ilves, in office since 2006, was re-elected. In March 2014, after the resignation of Ansip, Taavi Rõivas of the Reform Party became new prime minister. 34-year-old Rõivas was the youngest prime minister in Europe at that time. In March 2015, the ruling Reform party, led by Prime Minister Taavi Rõivas, won the parliamentary election In October 2016, Estonian parliament elected Kersti Kaljulaid as the new President of Estonia. She was the first female president of Estonia. In November 2016, the new chairman of the Centre Party Jüri Ratas became the new Prime Minister of Estonia. He succeeded prime minister Rõivas whose government lost a parliamentary vote of no-confidence.

In the parliamentary election of 2019, five parties gained seats at Riigikogu. The head of the Centre Party, Jüri Ratas, formed the government together with Conservative People's Party and Isamaa, while Reform Party and Social Democratic Party became the opposition. On January 13, 2021, Ratas resigned as prime minister in the wake of a corruption scandal.

On 26 January 2021, Reform Party leader Kaja Kallas became Estonia's first female prime minister, making Estonia the only country in the world to currently be led by both a female President and Prime Minister. The new government was a two-party coalition between country's two biggest political parties Reform Party and Centre Party. However, Alar Karis was sworn in as Estonia's sixth President on October 11, 2021. In July 2022, Prime Minister Kaja Kallas formed a new three-party coalition by her liberal Reform Party, the Social Democrats and the conservative Isamaa party. Her previous government had lost its parliamentary majority after the center-left Center Party left the coalition.

In March 2023, the Reform party, led by Prime Minister Kaja Kallas, won the parliamentary election, taking 31,4% of the vote. Far-right Conservative People's Party came second with 16,1 % and the third was the Centre Party with 15% of the vote. In April 2023, Kallas formed her third government, which included, in addition to Reform Party, also the liberal Estonia 200 and the Social Democratic (SDE) parties. In July 2024, Kristen Michal became Estonia's new prime minister to succeed Kaja Kallas, who resigned as prime minister on July 15 to become the European Union's new High Representative of the Union for Foreign Affairs and Security Policy.

According to the V-Dem Democracy indices, Estonia was, in 2026, the 4th most electoral democratic country in the world.

== Institutions ==
The framework for the political institutions of Estonia is provided by the Constitution of Estonia (Estonian: Eesti Vabariigi põhiseadus). The constitution follows the principle of separation of powers. Legislative power is wielded by the Parliament, executive power by the Government and judicial power by the courts. Each institution is further defined by their respective legislative acts.

=== Parliament ===
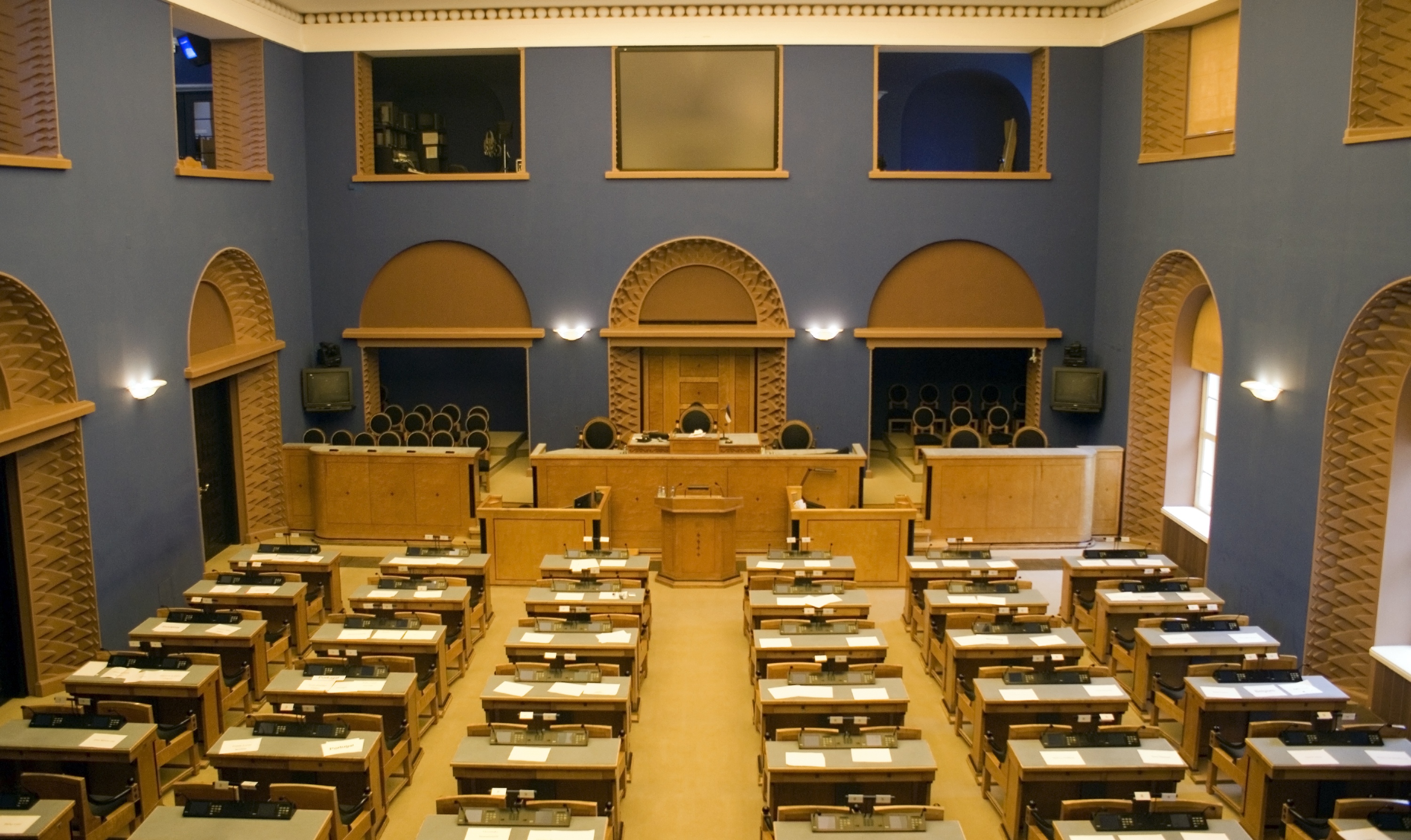
The Riigikogu (Parliament of Estonia) in the Toompea Castle of Tallinn, Estonia.

The Riigikogu is the representative legislative authority of the Republic of Estonia. It comprises 101 members who are elected at free elections for a four-year term according to the principle of proportional representation. The work of the Parliament is coordinated by the Board of the Riigikogu, which is led by the President of the Riigikogu and is elected for a term of one year. There are also factions within the Parliament, which carry out the programmes of their respective political parties. The work of the Parliament is supported by various committees, which are staffed by members of the factions. They prepare draft legislation and exercise parliamentary control over their fields of activity. The Chancellery of the Riigikogu is tasked with servicing the Parliament. It is headed by the Secretary General of the Riigikogu, who is appointed by the Board of the Riigikogu. Legislation is passed by an open majority vote. The quorum for the Parliament is provided in the Riigikogu Rules of Procedure and Internal Rules Act.

Citizens of Estonia who are at least 21 years of age and are eligible to vote may stand to be elected to the Parliament of Estonia. Citizens who are at least 18 years of age and are not convicted of a criminal offence have the right to participate in the voting for the Parliament of Estonia. Elections are called by the President of the Republic. After the election of the Parliament, the first sitting is convened by the President of the Republic, where the members of the Parliament will take an oath of office and then elect the President and Vice Presidents of the Parliament. After the election of the President and Vice Presidents, who are nominated by members of the Parliament, the Prime Minister announces the resignation of the Government so a new one could take its place. The procedure of elections is defined in the Riigikogu Election Act.

=== Head of State ===
The President is the head of state of the Republic of Estonia and serves as the highest representative of the state. Furthermore, the President can have limited participation in legislation by issuing decrees, resolutions and directives. Presidential legislation is administered by the Government of the Republic. In addition, the President can refuse to proclaim a law and return it to the Parliament for review. The President is assisted by the Office of the President, which is managed by the Head of the Office of the President. There are also several institutions under the jurisdiction of the President. These include: President's Academic Advisory Board, Roundtable on Regional Development, Estonian Memory Institute, Cultural Foundation of the President, Estonian Cooperation Assembly and National Defence Council. The mandate of the President is determined by the President of the Republic Work Procedure Act.

The President is elected by the Parliament of Estonia for a five-year term, but no more than two terms. If the Parliament does not secure at least two-thirds of the votes after three rounds of balloting, then an Electoral College (made up of the Parliament and representatives of local authority councils) elects the president, choosing between the two candidates with the largest percentage of votes. The President candidate is nominated with at least one-fifth support by members of the Parliament. Candidates have to be citizens of Estonia by birth and at least 40 years of age. The procedure for election of the President is provided in the President of the Republic Election Act. The President of the Riigikogu can also perform the duties of the President of the Republic in cases outlined in the constitution.

=== Government ===
The Government of the Republic (Estonian: Vabariigi Valitsus) is the executive authority of the Republic of Estonia. Its main task is governing the state and implementing policies. It comprises the Prime Minister of Estonia and ministers, who also serve as representatives in the Council of the European Union. The Prime Minister is the head of Government who represents the institution and directs its activities. Different areas of government are managed by various ministries, each of which is headed by a minister. Ministries are further divided into departments, divisions and bureaus. The work of the ministry is managed by a secretary general, who is recommended by the minister and appointed by the Government. Executive power is also exercised by executive agencies and inspectorates under the authority of a ministry. The Government of the Republic is assisted by the Government Office, which is led by the State Secretary. The State Secretary is appointed by the Prime Minister. The activities and organisation of the Government is regulated in the Government of the Republic Act.

After the appointment of the Parliament, the Prime Minister candidate is nominated by the President. The Parliament then decides whether to authorise the candidate to form the Government. If approved, the candidate presents a list of members of the Government to the President, who appoints the Government within three days. The Government of the Republic assumes office by taking an oath before the Parliament.

=== Central Bank ===
The Bank of Estonia (Estonian: Eesti Pank) is the central bank of the Republic of Estonia. Its mission is to maintain the stability of the Estonian financial system. It administers the circulation of currency, implements monetary policy, advises the Government and reports to the Parliament. However, it operates independently of other national government agencies. It is a member of the European System of Central Banks and may receive instructions from the European Central Bank. It is overseen by the supervisory board, which includes a chairman together with seven members. The chairman of the supervisory board is recommended by the President and appointed by the Parliament for a term of five years. The Bank of Estonia is headed by the Governor of the Bank of Estonia, who is recommended by the supervisory board and appointed by the President for a term of five years, but no more than one consecutive term. The Governor is also the chairman of the executive board, which is responsible for planning and organising the work of the institution. Furthermore, the Governor represents the Republic of Estonia in the Board of Governors of the International Monetary Fund. The Bank of Estonia is governed by strict confidentiality rules regarding banking secrets. The organisation and activities of the Bank of Estonia is regulated by the Bank of Estonia Act.

=== National Audit Office ===
The National Audit Office (Estonian: Riigikontroll) is an independent public body that carries out audits concerning public spending and assets, including the use of European Union funds. It mainly reports to the Parliament, but can and does share information with the Government and the public. It is headed by the Auditor General, who is recommended by the President and appointed by the Parliament for a term of five years. Every year the Auditor General presents reports about public assets to the Parliament, which are also made public. The National Audit Office has two main departments, the Audit Department and Development and Administrative Service. The Audit Department carries out various audits and the Development and Administrative Service supports its function. The National Audit Office also cooperates with the European Court of Auditors. The organisation and activities of the National Audit Office is regulated by the National Audit Office Act.

=== Chancellor of Justice ===
The Chancellor of Justice (Estonian: Õiguskantsler) is a public official who is tasked with supervising the conformity of legislation with the Constitution of Estonia and laws, protecting fundamental rights, performing the functions of the Ombudsman for Children and solving discrimination disputes. Anybody can turn to the Chancellor of Justice with issues of fundamental rights and freedoms or conformance of an act or legislation with the constitution or law. Every year a report is presented to the Parliament about the activities of the Chancellor of Justice. If the Chancellor of Justice finds that some legislation is not in conformance with the constitution or law, then it can be sent back to the body that passed it to be brought into conformity. If the legislation is not brought in conformity within 20 days, then the Chancellor of Justice can make a proposal to the Supreme Court to repeal it. The Chancellor of Justice also regularly inspects places of detention to prevent and protect detainees of ill-treatment. The working body of the Chancellor of Justice is the Office of Chancellor of Justice. The Chancellor of Justice is recommended by the President and appointed to office by the Parliament for a term of seven years. The status and the organisation of the office of the Chancellor of Justice is determined by the Chancellor of Justice Act.

=== Courts ===
Courts form the judiciary of the Republic of Estonia, which consists of three instances. The first instance courts include county and city courts and administrative courts. Circuit courts are the second instance and review the rulings of the courts of first instance on appeal. The Supreme Court (Estonian: Riigikohus) is the highest court instance and reviews rulings of other courts upon request for a motion to quash, but also acts as a constitutional court. The Chief Justice of the Supreme Court is recommended by the President and appointed by the Parliament. Justices of the Supreme Court are recommended by the Chief Justice and appointed by the Parliament. Other judges are recommended by the Supreme Court and appointed to office for life by the President. First and second instance courts are administered by the Ministry of Justice with the support of Council for Administration of Courts. The Supreme Court administers itself with the aid of self-government bodies. These include: Court en banc, Council for Administration of Courts, Disciplinary Chamber, Judge's examination committee and Judicial Training Council. First and second order courts are headed by chairmen, who are elected from among judges for a term of seven years. The organisation of the courts and their rules of procedure are established in the Courts Act.

=== Local government ===
The local self-government (Estonian: Kohalik omavalitsus) is the authority responsible for all local matters. They are based on rural municipalities and cities. The local authority is represented by its council, which is elected for a term of four years on free local elections, in conformance with the Municipal Council Election Act. The council can have no less than seven members. The work of the council is managed by the chairman, who is elected from among the members of the council. The executive body of the local authority is the municipal administration (government). The municipal administration is formed and managed by the mayor, who is appointed by the council. The mayor is also tasked with representing the local authority. The council has the right to impose taxes, duties and regulations according to law. These are only valid within the administrative territory of the local government. The council may also decide to form committees, law enforcement units and other administrative agencies. Residents of the municipality have the right to initiate passage, amendment or repeal of legislation of the local authority. Issues in the domain of the council are decided by an open vote. The functions, responsibility and organisation of local governments is determined by the Local Government Organisation Act.

=== Political parties ===
Estonia has a multi-party system in which parties usually need to form coalition governments. However, some local self-governments have been formed by a single party. Parties gain authority for implementing their policies by participating in local self-government council, state parliament and/or European Parliament elections. The political landscape is relatively stable, though fractured, and polarization on the left-right scale tends to be fairly weak. Most of the polarization is centered on ethnicity, which is infused with conflict over Estonia's history and identity inherited from the Soviet Union.

A party is founded by a memorandum of association as a non-profit association. It needs to have at least 1000 members and a platform approved by the leadership to be registered. Parties receive funding through donations and from state budget if they are either represented in the state parliament or managed to receive at least one percent of the votes in the elections of the parliament. Funding is reviewed by the political party funding supervision committee, which consists of members appointed for a term of five years by the Chancellor of Justice, Auditor General, National Electoral Committee and political parties represented in the parliament. Any Estonian citizen or a citizen of European Union with permanent residence in Estonia who is at least 18 years old can become a member of a political party. The organisation and activities of political parties is regulated by the Political Parties Act and Non-profit Associations Act.

== Policies ==
Mandate to implement policies is attained through elections. Political parties determine their program based on their platform and the input of members. Parties that get elected to a position of authority then have a chance to deliberate with other elected parties to decide which policies to implement and how.

=== Elections ===
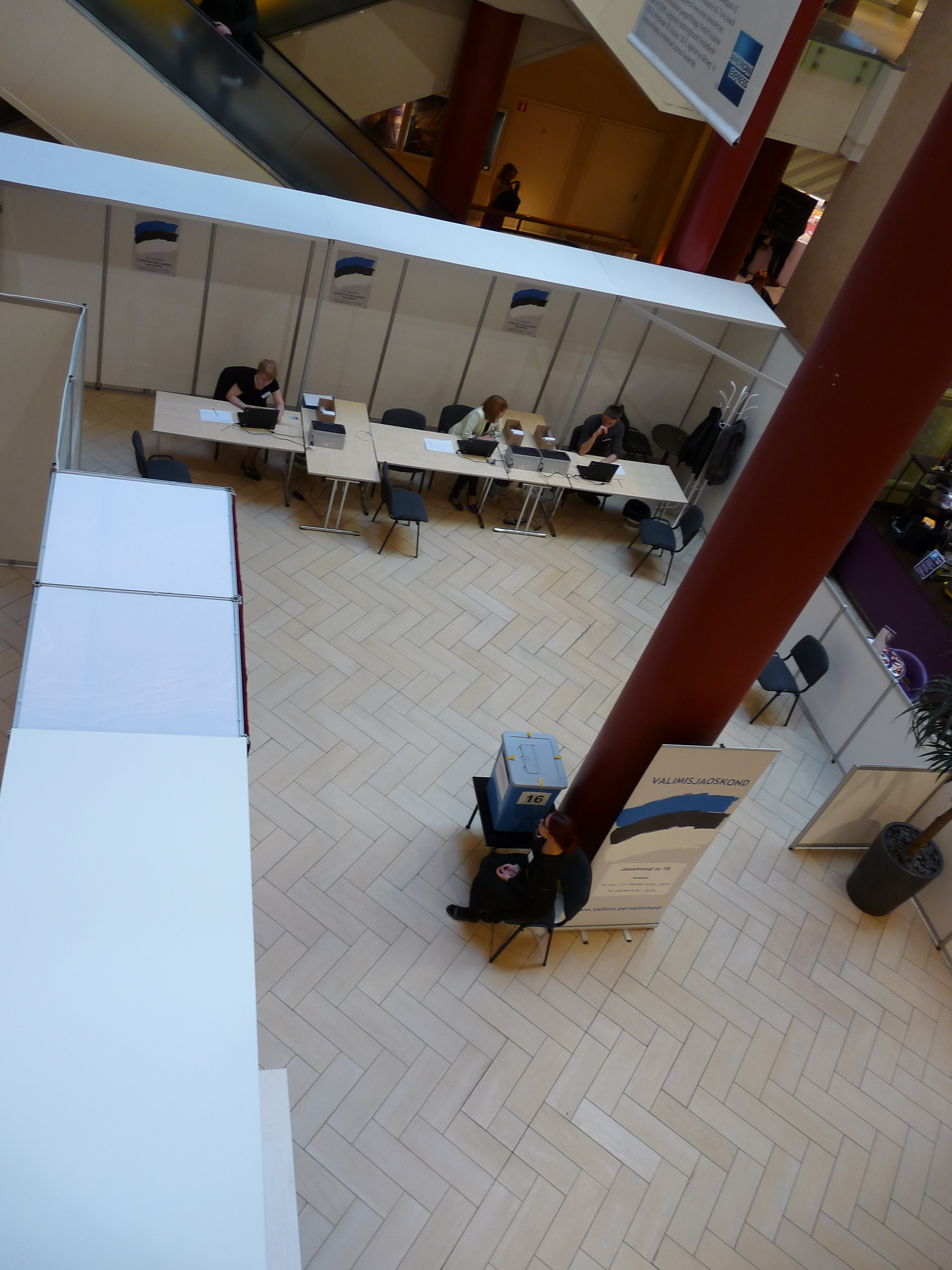
Preliminary elections to European parliament in Tallinn.

There are four types of public elections in Estonia: local government council elections, state parliament elections, European Parliament elections and referendums. Referendums can be initiated by the Parliament. The rules of procedure for elections are established in the Municipal Council Election Act, Riigikogu Election Act, European Parliament Election Act and Referendum Act. Elections are overseen by the National Electoral Committee and managed by the State Electoral Office, county heads of elections and voting district committees. Members of the National Electoral Committee, which is established for a term of four years, are appointed by the Chief Justice of the Supreme Court, Chancellor of Justice, Auditor General, Chief Public Prosecutor, State Secretary and Board of Auditors. The State Electoral Office is part of the Chancellery of the Riigikogu and its members are appointed by the Secretary General of the Parliament. It organises electronic voting and supervises the election managers. County heads of elections manage elections in the county by instructing and supervising voting district committees. They are either the county secretary or someone recommended by the country secretary and appointed by the Head of the State Electoral Office. A voting district committee is formed by the municipal council and comprises at least five members, with half of the members being presented by the municipal secretary and half by participating political parties. The activities of the National Electoral Committee and election managers can be observed by everyone.

Electronic voting was first used in Estonia during the municipal council elections of 2005. Since then the share of people voting electronically has continuously risen. Electronic voting is managed by the State Electoral Office, which establishes the technical requirements and organisation of electronic voting. Voting is based on the Estonian ID card. Every voter has the right to verify and change their vote electronically. If the voter has also voted with a ballot paper, then only the ballot paper will be taken into account.

Residents without Estonian citizenship may not elect the Riigikogu. Residents without citizenship of any European Union member state may not elect the European Parliament. All permanent residents, regardless of citizenship, are eligible to vote in the Estonian municipal elections.

=== Finance and the national budget ===
Estonia operates an advanced free-market economy, which is integrated into the wider European economy by being part of the European Union and the Eurozone. The Estonian monetary system is managed by the Estonian Central Bank, the national budget is drafted by the Government of the Republic and approved by the Parliament. The draft must be presented to the Parliament at least three months before the beginning of the budget year. The rules for drafting and passage of the state budget are described in the State Budget Act. Financial supervision is provided by the Financial Supervision Authority. It supervises securities market, banks, insurance providers, insurance mediators, investment associations and management companies.

Drafting of the national budget is annually co-ordinated by the Ministry of Finance and supported by other ministries. The ministries prepare plans for at least the next three years and then negotiate the draft budget with the Ministry of Finance, while the Government of the Republic acts as a mediator. After the draft has been finalized by the Government of the Republic, it is then presented to the Parliament for approval. The implementation of the budget is then organized by the Ministry of Finance. Rearrangement of the budget, so that the total revenues and expenses don't change, is passed as amendments, but changes to the total revenues and expenses have to be made through an additional budget. Revenues and expenses are accounted by the State Treasury.

Estonia has one of the lowest national debts in Europe. Part of the reason is that the State Budget Act requires the structural budget position to be in balance. There has also traditionally been a general political consensus over keeping the budget in balance and holding a decent reserve. The Estonian economy is frequently rated as one of the freest in the world and maintains a stable international credit rating. High efficiency is provided through an advanced internet banking system and e-governance.

=== Foreign relations and international treaties ===
Foreign relations are managed mainly by the Parliament, the Government of the Republic (including various ministries) and the President of the Republic, who mostly serves a representative role. The government can enter into international agreements and present them to the parliament for ratification. Agreements that are in conflict with the Constitution can not be ratified. One notable example of such a case was when Estonia decided to join the European Union, which required the amendment of the Constitution in order to ratify the Accession Treaty. The mandate for the amendment of the Constitution was gained through a public referendum.

Estonia's main foreign policy goals are to maintain national security and stability of international relations, ensuring the functioning of Estonian economy, protecting citizens abroad, maintaining good influence and reputation, and promoting democracy, human rights, rule of law and economic freedom. To achieve these goals, Estonia has set its priorities on involvement and integration into the European Union and NATO, and forming strong relations with countries that share its values, especially its close Baltic and Nordic neighbours. Baltic and Nordic cooperation is coordinated through such formats as: Baltic Council of Ministers, Baltic Assembly, Nordic-Baltic Eight (NB8), Council of the Baltic Sea States and Nordic Council of Ministers. Estonia is also a member of the UN, OECD, OSCE and WTO, among others.

Treaties can be initiated or concluded by the Ministry of Foreign Affairs. Other ministries and the State Chancellery can make proposals on treaties to the Ministry of Foreign Affairs, which then reviews the proposals. If the submission meets requirements, the ministry can then send it to the Government of the Republic for approval. Ratification of treaties is performed by the parliament. The performance of treaties is guaranteed by the Government of the Republic. The procedures pertaining to foreign relations are described in the Foreign Relations Act. After decades of Soviet occupation, Estonia decided to re-establish its independence in 1991. Because the annexation of Estonia was never recognized, and on the basis of the historical continuity of statehood, the state inherited the full responsibility for the rights and obligations of the Republic of Estonia that existed before the occupation. This means, that multilateral treaties, which were approved before the occupation, were considered to be still in effect. Thus, Estonia has re-assumed its international obligations through the restoration of old treaties.

=== National defence ===
Estonia's national defence is based on initial self-defence capability and membership in NATO. Estonia's security policy utilizes a broad concept of security, similar to the concept of total defence in several Nordic countries, in which all sectors of society are involved. According to the constitution, all citizens of Estonia have a duty to participate in national defence. Male citizens between the ages of 17-27 must partake in 8-12 month military service, though female citizens are also free to serve. Peace-time and war-time organisation of national defence is determined by the National Defence Act.

The supreme commander of national defence is the President of the Republic. The president is advised by the National Defence Council, which consists of the President of the Parliament, Chairman of the National Defence Committee, Chairman of the Foreign Affairs Committee, the Prime Minister with other ministers and the Commander of the Defence Forces. Planning, development and organisation of national defence is coordinated by the Security Committee of the Government of the Republic. Management of defence readiness, state of emergency and state of war are directed by the Prime Minister. Increase of defence readiness needs to be approved by the parliament. Beginning and end of state of war and mobilisation is proposed by the president and declared by the parliament. In case of aggression against the Republic of Estonia, state of war can be declared by the president without a corresponding resolution from the parliament. Use of the Defence forces in international cooperation is decided by the parliament. The activities of the Defence Forces are directed and organised by the Commander of the Estonian Defence Forces.
