= Kalev Stoicescu =

Estonian diplomat

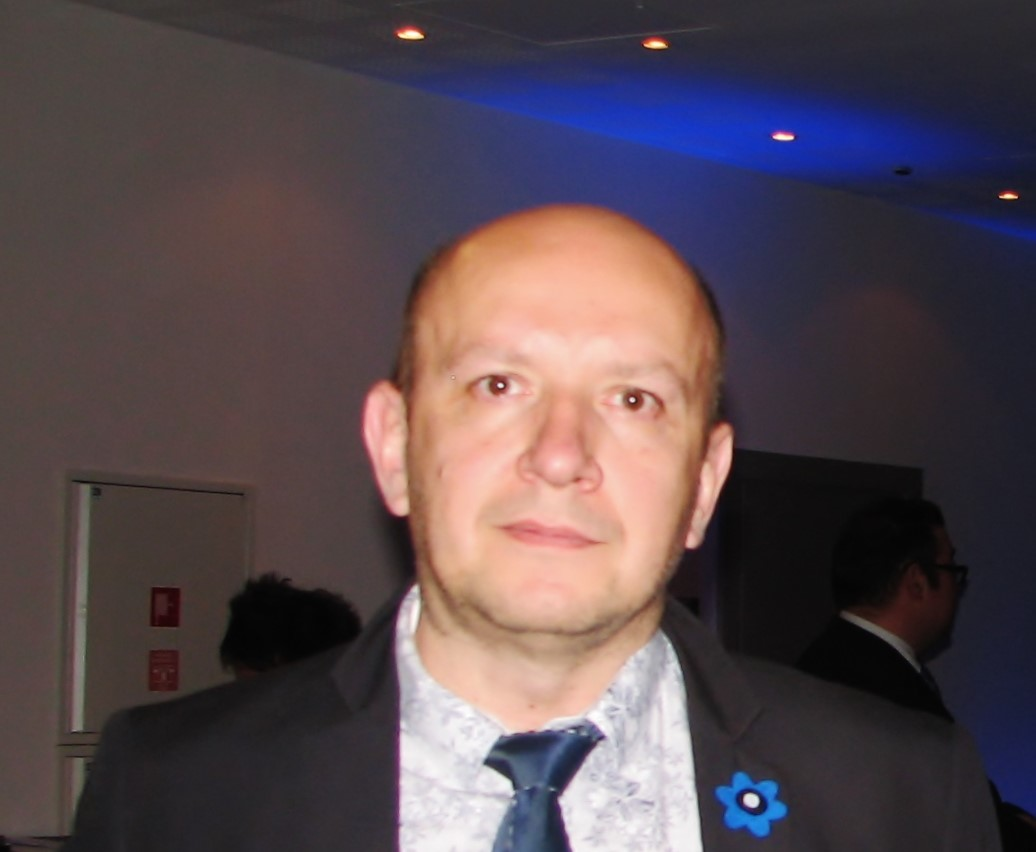

Member of the Riigikogu
- Incumbent
- Assumed office 10 April 2023

Ambassador of Estonia to the United States, Canada and Mexico
- In office 14 May 1997 – 12 January 2000
- Preceded by: Toomas Hendrik Ilves
- Succeeded by: Sven Jürgenson

Permanent Representative of Estonia to the OSCE
- In office 5 May 1993 – 1995
- Preceded by: Office established
- Succeeded by: Väino Reinart

Personal details
- Born: September 2, 1965 (age 61) Constanța, Romania
- Party: Parempoolsed (since 2026)
- Other political affiliations: Estonia 200 (2019–2026)
- Education: University of Tartu

Grigore-Kalev Stoicescu (born 2 September 1965) is an Estonian diplomat and politician representing the Estonia 200 party. He is a member of the XV Riigikogu. He is the Chairman of the National Defence Committee.

He was born in Romania to a Romanian father and an Estonian mother. He attended the Estonian School of Diplomacy in Tallinn.

From 1997 to 2000, he was Ambassador of Estonia to the United States and Canada, and later to Mexico.

He stood for the Riigikogu in the 2023 elections, received 3663 votes in constituency No 5 (Hiiu, Lääne and Saare) and was elected.
