= Lavly Perling =

Estonian lawyer and politician

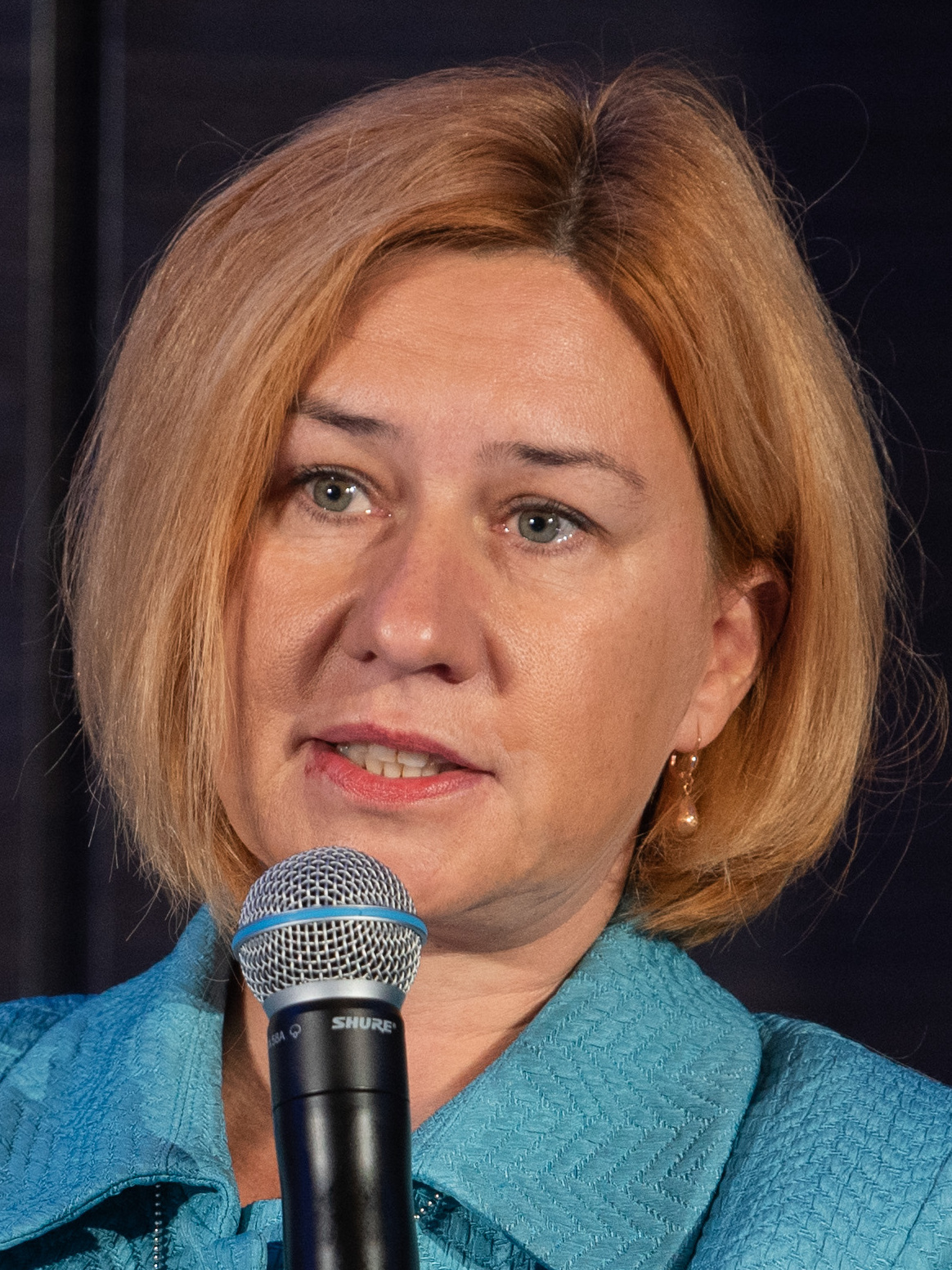
- Lavly Perling in 2021

Prosecutor General of Estonia
- In office 31 October 2014 – 30 October 2019
- Preceded by: Norman Aas
- Succeeded by: Andres Parmas

Leader of Parempoolsed
- Incumbent
- Assumed office 18 August 2022
- Preceded by: Office established

Personal details
- Born: Lavly Lepp; 26 September 1975 (age 51)
- Party: Parempoolsed (2022-)
- Other political affiliations: Isamaa (2021-2022)
- Education: University of Tartu, Law (BA), 1997

Lavly Perling (born 26 September 1975) is an Estonian lawyer and politician. Since 2022, she has been the head of the Parempoolsed party.

She graduated from Hugo Treffner Gymnasium. In 1997, she graduated from the University of Tartu.

== Career ==
Since 1996, she has worked in different judicial positions. On 31 October 2014, she was made Prosecutor General of Estonia and she served for one term until 2019. In 2021, she left the Prosecutor's Office, claiming that this way her speech was free.

In 2021, she joined Isamaa. With 579 votes, she was elected to the Saue municipal council in the 2021 Estonian municipal elections on the list of Isamaa. She was elected the vice chair of the Saue municipal council. After being kicked out of Isamaa in 2022, she founded the Parempoolsed party.

In the 2023 Estonian parliamentary election, she won 2,443 votes in the Riigikogu electoral district no. 4 but failed to be elected. Her party got 2.3% of the vote in the election, making it eligible for state funding.

In the 2025 Estonian municipal elections, she won 3,155 votes in the Kesklinn district of the Tallinn City Council and was elected as a councillor. Her party got 7.6% of the vote in Tallinn and 4.7% nationwide.

== Personal life ==
She has three children and was married to Jüri Pihl from 2008 to 2010. She is currently married to Martin Perling, an Internal Security Service officer.
