= Liberalism and centrism in Estonia =

This article gives an overview of liberalism and centrism in Estonia. It is limited to liberal and centrist parties with substantial support, mainly proved by having had a representation in parliament. The sign ⇒ denotes another party in that scheme. For inclusion in this scheme it is not necessary that the party has labeled itself as a liberal party.

== History ==
At the beginning of the twentieth century liberal parties emerged and played an important role in Estonia. They lost influence in the 1930s.

After the restoration of independence in 1990, both pragmatic centrist and liberal forces arose. The Estonian Reform Party (Eesti Reformierakond) is a free market liberal party. Despite its liberal international affiliations the Estonian Centre Party (Eesti Keskerakond) is generally not considered a liberal party, so therefore it is not included.

=== From Estonian Progressive People's Party to National Centre Party ===
- 1905: Jaan Tõnisson founded the Estonian Progressive People's Party (Eesti Rahvameelne Eduerakond)
- 1917: The party is renamed Democratic Party (Demokraatlik Erakond)
- 1919: The Democratic Party merged with the ⇒ Radical Democratic Party into the Estonian People's Party (Eesti Rahvaerakond)
- 1931: The Estonian People's Party merged with the Christian People's Party (Kristlik Rahvaerakond) into the United People's Party (Ühendatud Rahvaerakonnad)
- 1932: This is followed by the merger with the ⇒ Estonian Labour Party (Tööerakond) and the Union of Landlords (Üleriikline Majaomanikkude Seltside Liit) into the National Centre Party
- 1934: The party is banned

=== Radical Democratic Party ===
- 1917: Konstantin Päts, the later conservative leader, founded the Radical Democratic Party (Radikaal-Demokraatlik Erakond).
- 1919: The party merged with the ⇒ Democratic Party into the ⇒ Estonian People's Party

=== Radical Socialist Party / Estonian Labour Party ===
- 1917: Inspired by the French Radical Socialist and the Russian Trudoviki the Radical Socialist Party (Radikaalsotsialistlik Erakond) is founded.
- 1919: The party merged with the Social Travaillist Party into the Estonian Labour Party (Eesti Tööerakond)
- 1931: The Estonian Labour Party merged into the ⇒ National Centre Party.

=== From Popular Front to Estonian Centre Party ===
- 1988: Edgar Savisaar and Marju Lauristin founded the Popular Front (Rahvarinne) officially aiming at consolidating reform-minded people.
- 1992: The Popular Front fell apart and Savisaar founded the Estonian People's Centre Party (Eesti Rahva-Keskerakond), which was later renamed the Estonian Centre Party (Eesti Keskerakond).
- 1996: A faction formed the ⇒ Progressive Party
- 2004: A faction leaves and joins various parties (see Social Liberals). The liberal and centrist character of the party is often disputed, whereby the party is usually considered a left of centre populist/personalist party.

=== Estonian Liberal Democratic Party / Estonian Reform Party ===
- 1990: Liberals formed the Estonian Liberal Democratic Party (Eesti Liberaal-Demokraatlik Erakond)
- 1994: The party is the basis for the new Estonian Reform Party (Eesti Reformierakond)

=== Estonian Coalition Party ===
- 1991: Dissident members of Savisaar cabinet (Jaak Tamm), and centrists found the Estonian Coalition Party (Eesti Koonderakond), led by Tiit Vähi.
- 2000s: The party was disbanded

=== Progressive Party ===
- 1996: A faction of the Estonian Centre Party formed the Progressive Party (Arengupartei)
- 1999: The party disappeared

=== Estonia 200 ===
- 2018: Estonia 200 (Erakond Eesti 200) has been founded.

== Liberal leaders ==
- Jaan Tõnisson

== See also ==
- History of Estonia
- Politics of Estonia
- List of political parties in Estonia
