= 2025 Estonian municipal elections =

Local elections in Estonia

Municipal elections in Estonia were held on 19 October 2025. These were the first municipal elections since the restoration of independence in 1991 where citizens of non-EU countries (including citizens of Russia, Belarus, Ukraine, the United States, etc) could not vote, unless they held dual citizenship of Estonia or another EU country. These were also the last municipal elections since the restoration of independence where non-citizens could vote.

== Party manifestos and slogans ==
Party	Slogan and manifesto (external link)	Other slogan(s)
Centre Party	Out of the gridlock! (Estonian: Ummikust välja!)	
Reform Party	For a better Estonia! (Estonian: Parema Eesti eest!)	A better plan for Estonia (Estonian: Parem plaan Eestile)
Conservative People's Party	Of course EKRE! (Estonian: Muidugi EKRE!)	
Isamaa	Estonia needs change! (Estonian: Eesti vajab muutust!)	
Estonia 200	Estonia of a new generation! (Estonian: Uue põlvkonna Eesti!)	
Social Democratic Party	Everyone counts! (Estonian: Igaüks loeb!)	
Greens	For a humane Tallinn! (Note: Tallinn-exclusive slogan.) (Estonian: Inimliku Tallinna eest!)	
Free Party	It is better to be free (Estonian: Vaba on olla parem)	
Parempoolsed	Confidently right! (Note: More literally "Confidently for the better!" or "Firmly for the better!" as parem could be translated as both "better" and "right".) (Estonian: Kindlalt paremaks!)	Less taxes, more freedom! (Estonian: Vähem makse, rohkem vabadust!)
Together	TOGETHER we'll clean up the city! (Note: Tallinn-exclusive slogan.) (Estonian: KOOS teeme linna korda!)	
Estonian Nationalists and Conservatives	Facing Estonia! (Estonian: Näoga Eesti poole!)	

== Polling and projections ==
Polling and seat projection numbers presented for dates following 26 March 2025 account for only the voting eligibility of citizens of Estonia, the EU and non-citizens. Numbers presented before account for the voting rights of all eligible permanent residents, including the citizens of Russia and Belarus without the citizenship of Estonia.

=== Tallinn ===
==== Seat projections ====
Polling firm	Fieldwork Date	Kesk	Ref	EKRE	E200	SDE	Isamaa	Parem	Others	Lead	Gov. (Note: Includes support)	Opp.
Norstat/ÜI MRP (Note: The MRP projection page states that "while both our poll weighting methodology (verified in EP elections) and MRP (validated by international pollsters) have a strong track record individually, their combination for Estonian local elections is still experimental. The ratings contain uncertainty ranges and the results should be interpreted as informed estimates, not precise predictions.")	7-17 October 2025	36	8	6	0	13	11	5	0	23	32	47
Norstat/ÜI MRP	29 September-13 October 2025	39	9	6	0	13	12	0	0	26	34	45
Kantar Emor	25 September-13 October 2025	39	8	4	0	14	10	4	0	25	32	47
Kantar Emor	25 September-13 October 2025	41	9	4	0	15	10	0	0	26	34	45
Kantar Emor	25 September-13 October 2025	37	8	4	4	13	9	4	0	24	34	45
Turu-uuringute AS/Norstat/SALK	10 March-6 October 2025	35	9	5	0	12	13	5	0	22	34	45
Norstat/ÜI MRP	22 September-6 October 2025	38	10	6	0	12	13	0	0	25	35	44
Norstat/ÜI MRP	15-29 September 2025	38	8	6	0	13	14	0	0	24	35	44
Norstat/ÜI MRP	8-22 September 2025	38	9	6	0	13	13	0	0	25	35	44
Norstat/ÜI	10-21 September 2025	43	11	0	0	14	11	0	0	29	36	43
Norstat/ÜI MRP	1-15 September 2025	38	9	5	0	11	12	4	0	26	32	47
Norstat/ÜI MRP	25 August-8 September 2025	38	9	4	0	11	12	5	0	26	32	47
Norstat/ÜI MRP	18 August-1 September 2025	37	9	5	0	10	12	6	0	25	31	48
Norstat/ÜI MRP	11-25 August 2025	35	9	5	0	13	12	5	0	22	34	45
Norstat/ÜI MRP	4-18 August 2025	34	8	6	0	15	12	4	0	19	35	44
Norstat/ÜI MRP	21 July-4 August 2025	32	9	6	0	15	11	6	0	17	35	44
Turu-uuringute AS/SALK	10 March-4 August 2025	30	9	6	0	13	14	7	0	16	36	43
	22 Jul 2024	Ref leaves the coalition but continues to provide confidence support										
Norstat/ÜI MRP	30 June-14 July 2025	34	10	7	0	13	15	0	0	19	38	41
	7 Jul 2024	Ref rejoins the coalition										
	27 Jun 2024	Ref is expelled from the coalition										
Turu-uuringute AS/SALK	10 March-14 June 2025	29	13	7	4	11	15	0	0	16	43	36
Norstat/ÜI MRP	19 May-2 June 2025	31	13	6	0	12	13	4	0	18	38	41
Norstat/ÜI MRP	21 Apr-5 May 2025	33	13	6	0	14	13	0	0	19	40	39
Norstat/ÜI MRP	24 Mar-7 Apr 2025	32	15	6	0	12	14	0	0	17	41	38
	26 Mar 2025	Riigikogu votes to amend the Constitution to restrict municipal voting rights to just citizens of Estonia, the EU and non-citizens.										
Norstat/ÜI MRP	17 Feb-3 Mar 2025	34	11	8	0	11	15	0	0	19	37	42
Norstat/ÜI MRP	3-17 Feb 2025	31	14	8	0	12	14	0	0	17	40	39
	14 Apr 2024	Coalition government is formed by Ref, E200, SDE, and Isamaa with Jevgeni Ossinovski as Mayor										
	9 Nov 2021	Coalition government is formed by Kesk and SDE with Mihhail Kõlvart as Mayor										
Election Results	17 Oct 2021	38	15	8	7	6	5		0	23	38	41

== Results ==
2025 Tallinn City Council election
- 19 October 2025
- All 79 seats to Tallinn City Council; 40 seats needed for a majority
Party	Leader	Vote %	Seats	+/–
Centre	Mihhail Kõlvart	41.7	37	−1
SDE	Jevgeni Ossinovski	18.8	17	+11
Isamaa	Urmas Reinsalu	12.8	11	+6
Reform	Maris Lauri	9.5	8	−7
Parempoolsed	Lavly Perling	7.6	6	+6
EKRE	Martin Helme	4.5	0	−8
E200	Aleksei Jašin	2.8	0	−7
This lists parties that won seats. See the complete results below.
Mayor before	Mayor after
Jevgeni Ossinovski	Peeter Raudsepp

=== Nationwide ===
Party	Votes	%
Electoral coalitions	141,126	23.87
Centre Party	124,840	21.11
Isamaa	109,749	18.56
Reform Party	58,982	9.97
Social Democratic Party	58,484	9.89
Conservative People's Party of Estonia	48,478	8.20
Parempoolsed	27,686	4.68
Estonia 200	9,819	1.66
Together	4,459	0.75
Independents	3,118	0.53
Estonian Nationalists and Conservatives	2,491	0.42
Estonian Greens	1,228	0.21
Free Party	859	0.15
Total	591,319	100.00
Valid votes	591,319	99.57
Invalid/blank votes	2,543	0.43
Total votes	593,862	100.00
Registered voters/turnout	1,003,829	59.16
Source: Valimised

=== By municipality ===
Municipalities	Centre	Isamaa	Reform	SDE	EKRE	Parempoolsed	E200	Koos	Local Coalitions/Ind.	Total
Alutaguse Parish	–	1 (+1)	–	–	2	0	–	–	12 (+2)	15
Anija Parish	4	0	–	–	2 (-1)	–	–	–	13 (+5)	19
Antsla Parish	–	5 (+5)	–	–	3 (+1)	–	–	–	9 (-4)	17
Elva Parish	0 (-2)	12 (+4)	3 (-3)	–	3 (-4)	0	–	–	7 (+1)	25
Häädemeeste Parish	0	2 (-1)	–	–	2 (+2)	0	–	–	15 (-1)	19
Haapsalu	2 (-3)	11 (+11)	–	–	2 (-1)	0	-	-	8 (-7)	25
Haljala Parish	1 (+1)	2 (+2)	-	-	1 (-1)	–	–	-	13 (+1)	17
Harku Parish	2 (+1)	7 (+3)	5 (-2)	2 (+1)	1 (-2)	0	0 (-1)	-	4	21
Hiiumaa Parish	0 (-4)	5 (+3)	3	7	3 (+1)	0	0	–	5	23
Järva Parish	6 (+1)	6 (+3)	–	0	4 (-1)	0	–	–	5 (+1)	21
Jõelähtme Parish	2 (+2)	4 (+4)	8 (-3)	2	3	0	0	–	–	19
Jõgeva Parish	5 (-1)	8	0 (-5)	–	2 (-1)	0	–	–	12 (+7)	27
Jõhvi Parish (merged with Toila Parish)	5	1 (+1)	2 (-1)	–	1 (-1)	0	–	0	12 (+1)	21
Kadrina Parish	–	4 (+4)	–	–	1 (-1)	–	–	–	14 (-3)	19
Kambja Parish	0	4 (+2)	3 (-3)	–	1 (-2)	2 (+2)	–	–	11 (+1)	21
Kanepi Parish	2 (-2)	5 (+4)	5 (-3)	4 (+4)	1 (-3)	–	–	–	–	17
Kastre Parish	–	2 (+2)	–	–	2	0	–	–	13 (-2)	17
Kehtna Parish	0	3 (+3)	–	–	4 (+1)	–	–	–	14 (-4)	21
Keila	1	3 (+1)	4 (-7)	4 (+1)	1 (-1)	0	–	–	8 (+6)	21
Kihnu Parish	–	4 (+4)	–	–	0	–	–	–	5 (-4)	9
Kiili Parish	–	2 (+1)	1	–	0	0	–	–	14 (-1)	17
Kohila Parish	0	5 (-5)	0 (-1)	–	2 (-2)	–	–	–	14 (+8)	21
Kohtla-Järve	14 (+2)	0	–	1 (-4)	0	–	–	3 (+3)	7 (+1)	25
Kose Parish	–	6 (+6)	–	–	5	0	–	–	10 (-4)	21
Kuusalu Parish	1	3 (+3)	1	–	1 (-1)	1 (+1)	–	–	12 (-3)	19
Lääne-Harju Parish	–	1 (+1)	–	–	2	1 (+1)	–	–	17	21
Lääne-Nigula Parish	–	12 (+12)	–	4 (+4)	2 (-3)	0	–	–	7 (-4)	25
Lääneranna Parish	–	2 (+1)	–	–	2 (-1)	1 (+1)	–	–	12 (-1)	21
Loksa	8	–	–	–	–	–	–	–	7	15
Lüganuse Parish	10 (+4)	1 (-1)	–	0	0	–	–	–	8	19
Luunja Parish	–	5 (+5)	–	–	1 (-1)	–	–	–	11 (-4)	17
Maardu	20 (+4)	0	0	1	0	–	–	0	0 (-4)	21
Märjamaa Parish	0	7 (+7)	–	–	5	0	–	–	9 (-7)	21
Muhu Parish	–	0 (-13)	–	0	1	–	–	–	14 (+14)	15
Mulgi Parish	–	7 (+1)	–	–	2 (-1)	0	–	–	12 (+8)	21
Mustvee Parish	3 (-3)	2 (+1)	–	–	2 (-3)	0	–	–	10 (+1)	17
Narva	10	–	0	–	0	–	–	0	21 (+2)	31
Narva-Jõesuu	2 (-3)	0	–	–	–	1 (+1)	–	0	12	15
Nõo Parish	–	5 (+5)	–	–	1	0	–	–	9 (-5)	15
Otepää Parish	–	7 (+6)	3 (+1)	–	1 (-2)	1 (+1)	–	–	5 (-5)	17
Paide	1 (-2)	10 (+7)	2 (-1)	4 (+4)	3 (-1)	–	–	–	3 (-7)	23
Pärnu	5	10 (+4)	7 (-2)	–	7 (-3)	2 (+2)	0	–	8 (-1)	39
Peipsiääre Parish	–	2 (+2)	–	–	1 (+1)	–	–	–	18 (-3)	21
Põhja-Pärnumaa Parish	–	5 (+5)	–	–	3	–	–	–	13 (-5)	21
Põhja-Sakala Parish	–	6 (+4)	–	–	1 (-2)	–	–	–	12	19
Põltsamaa Parish	1 (-2)	7 (+7)	1 (-2)	–	1 (-3)	0	–	–	11	21
Põlva Parish	3 (-3)	5 (+2)	–	4 (+4)	5 (-1)	–	0 (-3)	–	10 (+7)	27
Raasiku Parish	–	–	–	–	1 (-1)	–	–	–	16 (+1)	17
Rae Parish	4 (+4)	9 (+6)	6 (-8)	2 (+1)	0 (-3)	4 (+4)	0 (-4)	–	–	25
Rakvere	1 (-3)	11 (+3)	1	2	4	2 (+2)	–	–	0 (-1)	21
Rakvere Parish	0	4 (+2)	–	–	3 (-1)	–	–	–	12 (-1)	19
Räpina Parish	3 (-1)	–	3 (-2)	3 (+3)	7 (+1)	–	–	–	5 (-1)	21
Rapla Parish	–	1 (+1)	3 (-2)	–	7 (-2)	0	–	–	16 (+3)	27
Rõuge Parish	0 (-1)	4 (+4)	–	4 (+4)	3	0	–	–	8 (-7)	19
Ruhnu Parish	–	–	–	–	–	–	–	–	7	7
Saarde Parish	–	1 (+1)	–	–	2 (-1)	–	–	–	12	15
Saaremaa Parish	3 (-1)	11 (+6)	4 (-2)	–	4 (-2)	0	–	–	9 (+1)	31
Saku Parish	–	0	1 (-2)	0	1 (-1)	0	–	0	19 (+3)	21
Saue Parish	0	4	3 (-2)	–	2 (-1)	4 (+4)	–	0	14 (+3)	27
Setomaa Parish	2 (+2)	0	–	–	2 (-3)	–	–	–	11 (+1)	15
Sillamäe	18 (+1)	–	–	–	0	–	–	–	3 (+3)	21
Tallinn	37 (-1)	11 (+6)	8 (-7)	17 (+11)	0 (-8)	6 (+6)	0 (-7)	0	0	79
Tapa Parish	3 (-1)	2 (+2)	3 (-1)	–	2 (-1)	–	–	–	11 (+1)	21
Tartu	4	16 (+11)	15 (-4)	8 (+3)	3 (-5)	0	3 (-5)	0	0	49
Tartu Parish	–	3 (+3)	–	–	2 (-2)	0	–	–	20 (-1)	25
Tori Parish	0 (-3)	7 (+7)	0 (-1)	–	3 (-2)	0	–	0	13 (-1)	23
Tõrva Parish	–	4 (+2)	6 (-5)	–	3	–	–	–	8 (+5)	21
Türi Parish	–	–	2	5 (+5)	4 (+1)	0	–	–	12 (-6)	23
Väike-Maarja Parish	1 (-3)	2 (+1)	3 (-4)	–	3	–	–	–	8 (+4)	17
Valga Parish	4 (-4)	5 (+5)	3 (-3)	5 (+5)	3	–	–	–	5 (-3)	25
Viimsi Parish	4 (+1)	5 (+3)	7 (+1)	0	0 (-2)	0	0 (-3)	–	5	21
Viljandi	0 (-2)	11 (+7)	4 (-3)	–	3 (-1)	–	0 (-2)	–	9 (+1)	27
Viljandi Parish	–	16 (+3)	3 (-3)	–	4 (-4)	0	0	–	4 (+4)	27
Vinni Parish	2 (-3)	4 (+1)	–	–	3 (-1)	–	–	–	8 (+3)	17
Viru-Nigula Parish	0 (-1)	9 (+9)	–	–	1	–	–	0	9 (-10)	19
Vormsi Parish	–	4 (+4)	–	–	–	–	–	–	3 (-2)	7
Võru	2 (+1)	6 (+4)	1 (-2)	9 (-1)	3 (-2)	–	–	–	0	21
Võru Parish	1 (-1)	3 (+3)	1 (-2)	3 (+3)	4	–	–	–	9 (-3)	21
Total	197 (-50)	352 (+212)	125 (-119)	91 (+51)	164 (-81)	25 (NEW)	3 (-37)	3 (NEW)	728 (-26)	1688 (-29)

Leading party by municipalities: Centre Reform EKRE Isamaa Social Democratic Electoral coalitions
