= Lauri Hussar =

Estonian journalist

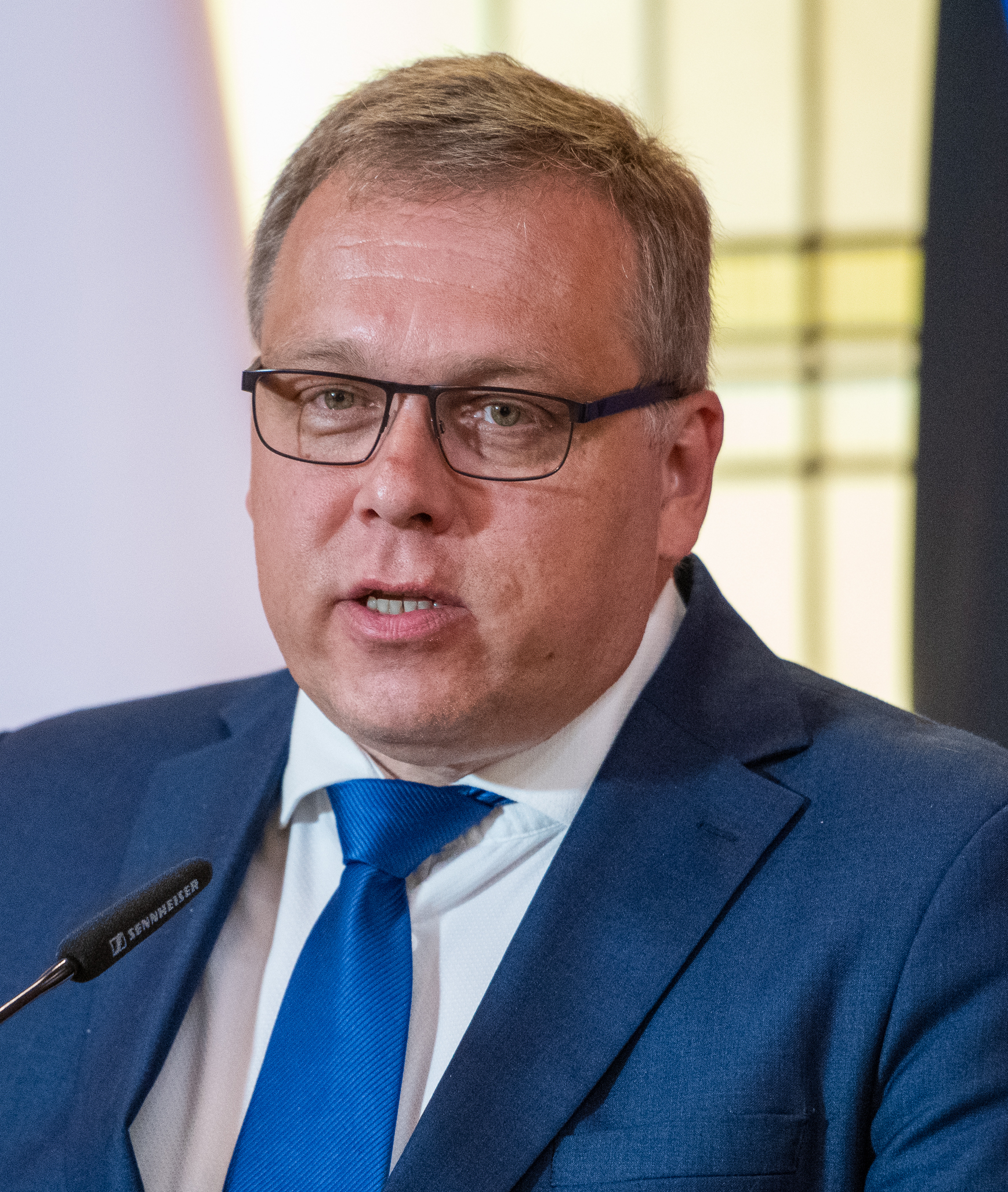
- Hussar in 2023

President of the Riigikogu
- Incumbent
- Assumed office 10 April 2023
- Preceded by: Jüri Ratas

Member of the Riigikogu
- Incumbent
- Assumed office 10 April 2023

Leader of the Eesti 200
- In office 15 October 2022 – 19 November 2023
- Preceded by: Kristina Kallas
- Succeeded by: Margus Tsahkna

Personal details
- Born: 4 September 1973 (age 52) Võru, then part of Estonian SSR, Soviet Union
- Party: Estonia 200
- Education: University of Tartu

Lauri Hussar (born 4 September 1973) is an Estonian journalist and politician who has served as President of the Estonian parliament (Riigikogu) since 2023. He is a member of the Estonia 200 political party. Prior to his career in politics, he was a journalist and television host, including being the editor-in-chief of the Postimees daily newspaper.

== Early life and education ==
Lauri Hussar was born in Võru, Estonian Soviet Socialist Republic, on 4 September 1973. He graduated from the Friedrich Reinhold Kreutzwald Võru Secondary School No. 1 in 1991, and graduated with a master's degree in theology from the University of Tartu in 1997. The Student Corporation Arminia Doapatensis was refounded by Hussar in 1994.

== Career ==
=== Journalism ===
At TV3, he was a reporter, editor, and news programme host from 1998 to 2006, and head of news from 2004 to 2006. He was a host at Eesti Rahvusringhääling, Vikerraadio, and Eesti Televisioon from 2006 to 2016. Postimees hired him as deputy editor-in-chief on 14 March 2016, and then promoted him to editor-in-chief, which he held from 2016 to 2019.

=== Politics ===
Hussar joined Estonia 200 in 2019. In the 2022 Estonia 200 leadership election, Hussar defeated Kristina Kallas, the incumbent leader and co-founder, by a vote of 101 to 94. He was a member of the Viimsi Rural Municipality Council and served as its chair from 2021 to 2023.

Marek Reinaas nominated Hussar for speaker, and he defeated Martin Helme, leader of the Conservative People's Party of Estonia, to become speaker by a vote of 59 to 20 on 10 April 2023. He was reelected as president in 2025, with 51 votes against Helir-Valdor Seeder's 42.

== Personal life ==
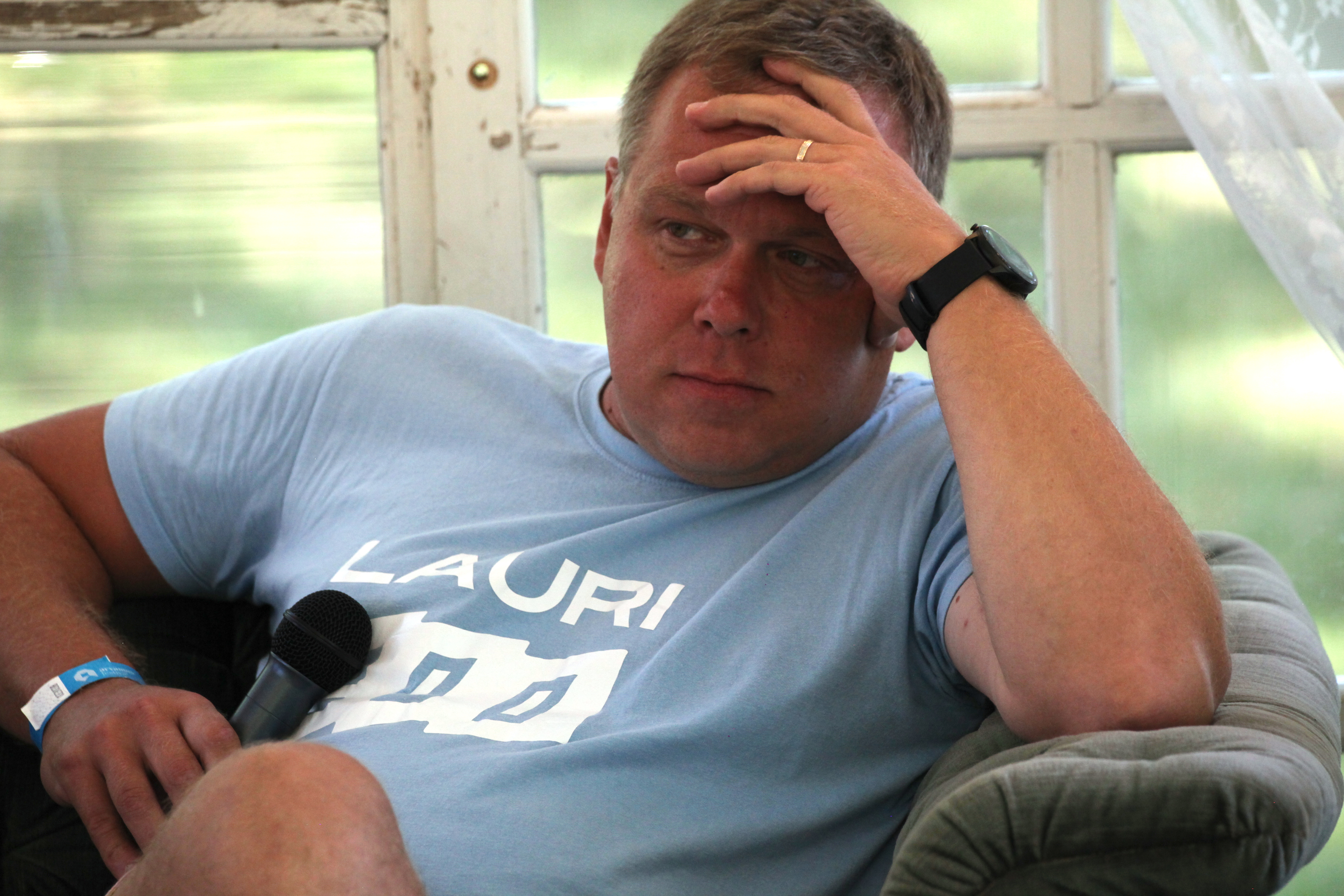
Hussar at Arvamusfestival in Paide in 2022

Hussar married Triin Aasa, with whom he had three children, on 31 July 2008.

== Honours ==
The Order of the Polar Star, Order of the White Rose of Finland, and Order of Prince Yaroslav the Wise have been awarded to Hussar.

== Political positions ==
In 2025, Hussar stated that the meeting between U.S. President Donald Trump and Ukrainian President Volodymyr Zelenskyy was a "loud wake-up call for Europe" and that Europe should increase its defence spending. He has been critical of Russian President Vladimir Putin and stated that he cannot be trusted.

== Works cited ==
=== News ===
- "A Conversation with Lauri Hussar, President of the Estonian Parliament". Groupe d'études géopolitiques. 7 March 2025. Archived from the original on 23 June 2025.
- "Eesti 200 leader Lauri Hussar elected Riigikogu speaker". Eesti Rahvusringhääling. 10 April 2023. Archived from the original on 23 June 2025.
- "Gallery: Lauri Hussar elected Eesti 200 chair". Eesti Rahvusringhääling. 15 October 2022. Archived from the original on 23 June 2025.
- "Lauri Hussar asub tööle Postimehes". Postimees. 22 January 2016. Archived from the original on 23 June 2025.
- "Lauri Hussar to continue as president of Estonian parlt". The Baltic Times. 27 March 2025. Archived from the original on 23 June 2025.
- Kaukvere, Tiina (9 June 2016). "Postimehe uueks peatoimetajaks saab Lauri Hussar (10)". Postimees. Archived from the original on 23 June 2025.
- Koppel, Nataly (7 August 2008). "Radio personality Lauri Hussar married a stewardess". Õhtuleht. Archived from the original on 23 June 2025.

=== Web ===
- "Lauri Hussar". Riigikogu. Archived from the original on 23 June 2025.
