= Kristina Kallas =

Estonian politician

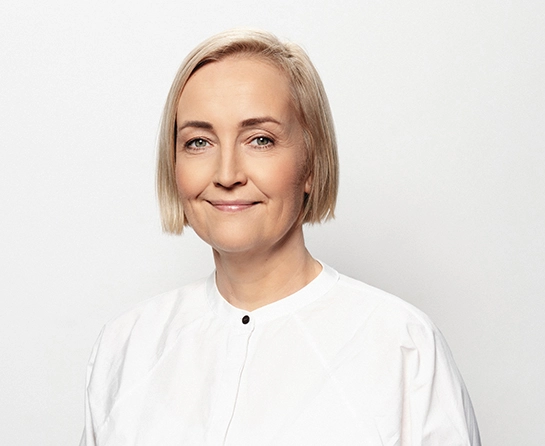
- Official portrait, 2023

Minister of Education and Research
- Incumbent
- Assumed office 17 April 2023
- Prime Minister: Kaja Kallas; Kristen Michal
- Preceded by: Tõnis Lukas

Leader of the Eesti 200
- Incumbent
- Assumed office 31 August 2024
- Preceded by: Margus Tsahkna
- In office 3 November 2018 – 15 October 2022
- Preceded by: Position established
- Succeeded by: Lauri Hussar

Personal details
- Born: 29 January 1976 (age 50) Kiviõli, then part of Estonian SSR, Soviet Union
- Party: Eesti 200
- Children: 3
- Education: University of Tartu; Central European University

Kristina Kallas (born 29 January 1976) is an Estonian politician who is the leader of the Eesti 200 party. She is not related to former Prime Ministers Kaja and Siim Kallas.

Kallas has served as Minister of Education and Research since 17 April 2023, in the third cabinet of Kaja Kallas and in the cabinet of Kristen Michal.
