= 2021 Estonian municipal elections =

Local elections in Estonia

Municipal elections in Estonia were held in October 2021, with advance voting starting on 11 October, and election day on 17 October.

Leading party by municipalities: Centre Reform EKRE Isamaa Social Democratic Electoral coalitions

== Polling ==
=== Tallinn ===
Polling firm	Fieldwork Date	Sample size	Ref	Kesk	EKRE	I	SDE	E200	Green	Others	Lead	Gov.	Opp.
Norstat	24 Sep–13 Oct 2021	≥1,000	17.6	42.3	13.1	6.2	8.8	9.3	2	2.4	24.7	39.5	58.1
Norstat	24 Sep–3 Oct 2021	≥1,000	19.0	39.6	13.2	5.0	8.4	10.9	2	2.4	20.6	39.5	58.1
Kantar Emor	15–29 Sep 2021	≥1,000	20.6	39.2	10.7	5.5	11.3	8.2	2.2	0.9	18.6	46.9	52.2

== Results ==
2021 Tallinn City Council election
← 2017	17 October 2021	2025 →
- All 79 seats to Tallinn City Council; 40 seats needed for a majority
- Turnout: 54.5%
Party	Leader	Vote %	Seats	+/–
Centre	Mihhail Kõlvart	45.4	38	−2
Reform	Kristen Michal	17.8	15	−3
EKRE	Martin Helme	9.6	8	+2
E200	Marek Reinaas	9.5	7	New
SDE	Raimond Kaljulaid	7.5	6	−3
Isamaa	Urmas Reinsalu	7.1	5	0
Electoral coalitions		0.7	0	−1
This lists parties that won seats. See the complete results below.
Mayor of Tallinn before	Mayor of Tallinn after
Mihhail Kõlvart	Mihhail Kõlvart

=== Nationwide ===
Party	Votes	%
Estonian Centre Party	142,596	24.39
Electoral coalitions	141,861	24.27
Estonian Reform Party	101,295	17.33
Conservative People's Party of Estonia	77,236	13.21
Isamaa	48,848	8.36
Estonia 200	35,317	6.04
Social Democratic Party	29,082	4.97
Estonian Greens	6,307	1.08
Independents	1,770	0.30
TULE	281	0.05
Total	584,593	100.00
Registered voters/turnout	1,100,647	54.7
Source: Valimised

=== By municipality ===
Municipalities	Centre	Reform	EKRE	Isamaa	E200	SDE	Green	Ind.	Total
Alutaguse Parish	1 (-1)	2 (-2)	2	0	–	–	–	10	15
Anija Parish	4 (-1)	4 (+1)	3	0	–	–	–	8	19
Antsla Parish	0 (-1)	–	2	–	–	–	2	13	17
Elva Parish	2	6 (-4)	7	8	–	–	–	6	29
Häädemeeste Parish	–	0	–	3 (+2)	–	–	–	16	19
Haapsalu	5	2	3 (+2)	–	0	–	–	15	25
Haljala Parish	0 (-2)	3 (-1)	2 (+1)	0	–	–	–	12 (+1)	17
Harku Parish	1	7 (+1)	3 (+1)	4	1	1	0	4	21
Hiiumaa Parish	4 (+3)	3 (+1)	2 (+2)	2	0	7	–	5 (-1)	23
Järva Parish	5 (+4)	4 (-1)	5 (+2)	3	–	–	–	4	21
Jõelähtme Parish	0 (-1)	11 (+1)	3 (+1)	0	1	2 (-1)	0	0	17
Jõgeva Parish	6 (-2)	5 (-1)	3 (+1)	8	–	–	0	5	27
Jõhvi Parish	5 (+2)	3 (+1)	2	0	–	–	–	11	21
Kadrina Parish	–	–	2	–	–	–	–	17 (-6)	19
Kambja Parish	0	6 (-6)	3 (+2)	2	–	–	–	10	21
Kanepi Parish	4 (-2)	8 (-5)	4 (+4)	1	–	–	–	–	17
Kastre Parish	–	–	2	0	0	–	0	15 (+2)	17
Kehtna Parish	–	–	3	0	–	–	–	18	21
Keila	1	11 (-1)	2	2	–	3 (+1)	–	2	21
Kihnu Parish	–	–	–	–	–	–	–	9	9
Kiili Parish	0	1	1	–	–	–	–	15	17
Kohila Parish	0	1	4 (+2)	10	–	–	–	6	21
Kohtla-Järve	12 (-6)	2	0	0	–	5	–	6	25
Kose Parish	–	–	5	–	–	–	–	14 (-4)	19
Kuusalu Parish	1	1	2	–	–	–	–	15	19
Lääne-Harju Parish	–	2 (-2)	2 (+2)	0	–	–	–	17	21
Lääne-Nigula Parish	5 (+5)	4 (+2)	5 (+2)	–	–	–	–	11	25
Lääneranna Parish	4 (+4)	–	3 (+1)	1	–	–	–	13 (-3)	21
Loksa	8 (-5)	–	–	–	–	–	–	7	15
Lüganuse Parish	6	3	–	2	–	–	–	8	19
Luunja Parish	–	–	2	–	–	–	–	15 (-2)	17
Maardu	16 (+1)	0	0	–	–	1	–	4	21
Märjamaa Parish	–	–	5	–	–	–	–	16	21
Muhu Parish	–	1 (-1)	1	13	–	–	–	–	15
Mulgi Parish	7 (-1)	1 (-2)	3 (+3)	6	–	–	–	4	21
Mustvee Parish	6 (+2)	–	5	1	–	–	–	9	21
Narva	10 (-13)	–	0	–	2	–	–	19	31
Narva-Jõesuu	5 (-2)	–	–	–	–	–	–	12	17
Nõo Parish	–	0	1	–	0	–	–	14	15
Otepää Parish	0 (-3)	2 (-3)	3 (+3)	1	1	–	–	10	17
Paide	3 (-2)	3	4 (+2)	3	–	–	–	10	23
Pärnu	5 (-2)	9	10 (+4)	6	0	0 (-1)	0	9 (+2)	39
Peipsiääre Parish	0	–	0	–	–	–	–	21 (+4)	21
Põhja-Pärnumaa Parish	–	–	3 (+3)	–	–	–	–	18 (-3)	21
Põhja-Sakala Parish	3 (+3)	0 (-3)	3 (+3)	2	1	–	–	12 (+3)	21
Põltsamaa Parish	3	3 (+1)	3 (+1)	–	–	1 (-6)	–	11	21
Põlva Parish	6 (-1)	6 (-2)	6 (+4)	3	3	–	–	3 (+1)	27
Raasiku Parish	0	–	2	–	–	–	–	15	17
Rae Parish	0 (-2)	14	3 (+1)	3	4	1 (-3)	–	0	25
Rakvere	4 (+1)	1 (-6)	4 (+2)	8	1	2	0	1 (-1)	21
Rakvere Parish	0 (-1)	–	4 (+3)	2	–	–	–	13	19
Räpina Parish	4 (+1)	5 (-2)	6 (+3)	–	–	0 (-3)	–	6	21
Rapla Parish	–	5	9 (+4)	0	0	–	–	13	27
Rõuge Parish	1 (+1)	–	3 (+2)	–	–	–	–	15	19
Ruhnu Parish	–	–	–	–	–	–	–	7	7
Saarde Parish	0	–	3 (+2)	0	–	–	–	12	15
Saaremaa Parish	4 (+1)	6 (-2)	6 (+4)	5	2	–	0	8	31
Saku Parish	0	3	2	0	0	–	–	16	21
Saue Parish	0	5	3	4	4	0	–	11	27
Setomaa Parish	0 (-1)	–	5	–	–	–	–	10 (-2)	15
Sillamäe	17 (+2)	–	0	–	–	4	–	0	21
Tallinn	38 (-2)	15 (-3)	8 (+2)	5	7	6 (-3)	0	0	79
Tapa Parish	4 (-1)	4	3 (+3)	0	–	–	0	10	21
Tartu	4 (-3)	19 (-1)	8 (+2)	5	8	5 (-3)	0	0	49
Tartu Parish	0	–	4	–	–	–	–	21 (-13)	25
Toila Parish	–	1	–	–	0	–	–	16	17
Tori Parish	3 (-2)	1	5 (+4)	–	–	–	–	14	23
Tõrva Parish	2	11	3 (+3)	2	–	–	–	3	21
Türi Parish	0 (-1)	2 (-1)	3 (+1)	–	–	–	–	18	23
Väike-Maarja Parish	4 (+1)	7	3 (+3)	1	–	–	0	4	19
Valga Parish	8 (-4)	6 (-1)	3 (+2)	–	–	–	0	8	25
Viimsi Parish	3 (+1)	6 (-3)	2	2	3	–	0	5 (+1)	21
Viljandi	2	7 (-1)	4 (+2)	4	2	–	–	8	27
Viljandi Parish	0	6 (+2)	8 (+6)	13	0	–	0	0	27
Vinni Parish	5 (-3)	–	4 (+2)	3	–	–	–	5	17
Viru-Nigula Parish	1 (-4)	–	1	–	–	–	–	19 (+3)	21
Vormsi Parish	2 (+2)	–	–	–	–	–	–	5	7
Võru	1 (-2)	3	5 (+4)	2	–	10 (-1)	–	0	21
Võru Parish	2 (+1)	3 (+1)	4	0	–	–	–	12 (-5)	21
Total	247 (-50)	244 (-47)	245 (+158)	140 (-12)	40	48 (-103)	2 (+2)	754 (+4)	1717 (-12)
