= 2003 Estonian European Union membership referendum =

- 14 September 2003
- Are you in favour of joining the European Union and adopting amendments to the Constitution of the Republic of Estonia?

Results
Choice	Votes	%
Yes	369,657	66.83%
No	183,454	33.17%
Valid votes	553,111	99.51%
Invalid or blank votes	2,724	0.49%
Total votes	555,835	100.00%
Registered voters/turnout	867,714	64.06%

For
50%–60%
60%–70%
70%–80%
Against
50%–60%
60%–70%
70%–80%

A referendum took place on 14 September 2003 to decide whether Estonia should join the European Union (EU). Just over two-thirds of voters voted Yes and Estonia joined the EU on 1 May 2004.

As of 2025, this was the most recent referendum in Estonia.

== Background ==
Membership of the European Union was one of the main objectives of Estonian foreign policy since independence in 1991. Estonia was invited to begin negotiations to join the EU in 1997 and was formally invited to join at a summit in Copenhagen in December 2002. The Parliament of Estonia then announced that a referendum on membership of the EU would be held in mid September 2003.

== Referendum question ==
The question to be voted on in the referendum was agreed by the Government of Estonia in December 2002. It was:

Are you in favour of the accession to the European Union and passage of the Act on Amendments to the Constitution of the Republic of Estonia?

== Campaign ==
Opinion polls in the first half of 2003 showed only lukewarm support for membership. This persuaded leading politicians including President Arnold Rüütel, Prime Minister Juhan Parts and the Speaker of Parliament Ene Ergma to start campaigning hard for a Yes vote.

The economy was one of the main issues used by both sides in the referendum campaign. Supporters of joining the EU said that it would fuel growth and create more jobs, while opponents said that EU entry would slow the growth of the Estonian economy. Opponents also argued that Estonia should not go straight from one union, the Soviet Union, into the EU.

The Yes campaign had strong media, political and financial backing with the Estonian Centre Party being the only leading party against entry into the EU. Posters for the Yes campaign predominated, with one poster handed out by the Res Publica Party calling for Estonians to vote Yes 'for access to millions of sexier men'. As the vote neared, polls showed increasing support for the Yes camp with one poll showing 70% support for EU entry.

== Results ==
Choice	Votes	%
For	369,657	66.83
Against	183,454	33.17
Total	553,111	100.00
Valid votes	553,111	99.51
Invalid/blank votes	2,724	0.49
Total votes	555,835	100.00
Registered voters/turnout	867,714	64.06
Source: EU Referendum 2003
