= 1992 Estonian referendum =

Estonian referendum on a new constitution and citizenship

A referendum on a new constitution and citizenship was held in Estonia on 28 June 1992. Voters were asked whether they approved of the new constitution drawn up by the Constitutional Assembly and extending suffrage to people who had applied for citizenship by 5 June. The new constitution was approved by 92% of voters, whilst the suffrage extension was rejected by 53%. Voter turnout was 67%.

== Results ==
=== New constitution ===
| Choice | Votes | % |
|---|---|---|
| For | 407,867 | 91.86 |
| Against | 36,147 | 8.14 |
| Total | 444,014 | 100.00 |
| Valid votes | 444,014 | 99.40 |
| Invalid/blank votes | 2,694 | 0.60 |
| Total votes | 446,708 | 100.00 |
| Registered voters/turnout | 669,080 | 66.76 |
Source: Nohlen & Stöver

=== Suffrage extension ===
| Choice | Votes | % |
|---|---|---|
| For | 205,980 | 46.52 |
| Against | 236,819 | 53.48 |
| Total | 442,799 | 100.00 |
| Valid votes | 442,799 | 99.18 |
| Invalid/blank votes | 3,679 | 0.82 |
| Total votes | 446,478 | 100.00 |
| Registered voters/turnout | 669,080 | 66.73 |
Source: Nohlen & Stöver
