= 2009 European Parliament election in Estonia =

- 7 June 2009

6 seats to the European Parliament

An election for Members of the European Parliament from Estonia to the European Parliament was held on 7 June 2009.

Turnout was 43.9% – about 17.1% higher than during the previous election five years before. The turnout was also slightly above the European average of 42.94%.

Six seats were up for taking in this election: two of them were won by the Estonian Centre Party. Estonian Reform Party, Union of Pro Patria and Res Publica, Social Democratic Party and an independent candidate Indrek Tarand all won one seat each.

The election result was remarkable in that the independent candidate Indrek Tarand gathered the support of 102,460 voters, only 1,046 votes less than the winner of the election, Estonian Centre Party, surpassing the results of all other major and minor parties.

Another independent candidate, eurosceptical Martin Helme, surprised also in gaining 9,832 votes and thus surpassing one parliament party - People's Union of Estonia - and gaining only 1,019 less than the next best on the list, Estonian Greens.

The election was conducted using the D'Hondt method with closed lists. The success of independent candidates in this election has been attributed both to general disillusionment with major parties and use of closed lists which rendered voters unable to cast a vote for specific candidates in party lists.

== Results ==
Party	Votes	%	Seats	+/–
Estonian Centre Party	103,506	26.07	2	+1
Estonian Reform Party	60,877	15.33	1	0
Pro Patria and Res Publica Union	48,492	12.22	1	0
Social Democratic Party	34,508	8.69	1	–2
Estonian Greens	10,851	2.73	0	New
People's Union of Estonia	8,860	2.23	0	0
Estonian United Left Party	3,519	0.89	0	0
Libertas Estonia	2,206	0.56	0	0
Party of Estonian Christian Democrats	1,715	0.43	0	New
Russian Party in Estonia	1,267	0.32	0	0
Farmers' Assembly	612	0.15	0	New
Independents	120,569	30.37	1	+1
Total	396,982	100.00	6	0
Valid votes	396,982	99.45		
Invalid/blank votes	2,199	0.55		
Total votes	399,181	100.00		
Registered voters/turnout	909,628	43.88		
Source: VVK

== Elected Members of the European Parliament ==
- Edgar Savisaar (Estonian Centre Party)
- Siiri Oviir (Estonian Centre Party)
- Indrek Tarand (independent)
- Kristiina Ojuland (Estonian Reform Party)
- Tunne Kelam (Union of Pro Patria and Res Publica)
- Ivari Padar (Social Democratic Party)

Edgar Savisaar renounced his mandate, leaving his seat to the third candidate in the party's list – his wife Vilja Savisaar. She was confirmed as a Member of the European Parliament on 7 July 2009.
