= Parempoolsed =

Political party in Estonia

The Right Parempoolsed
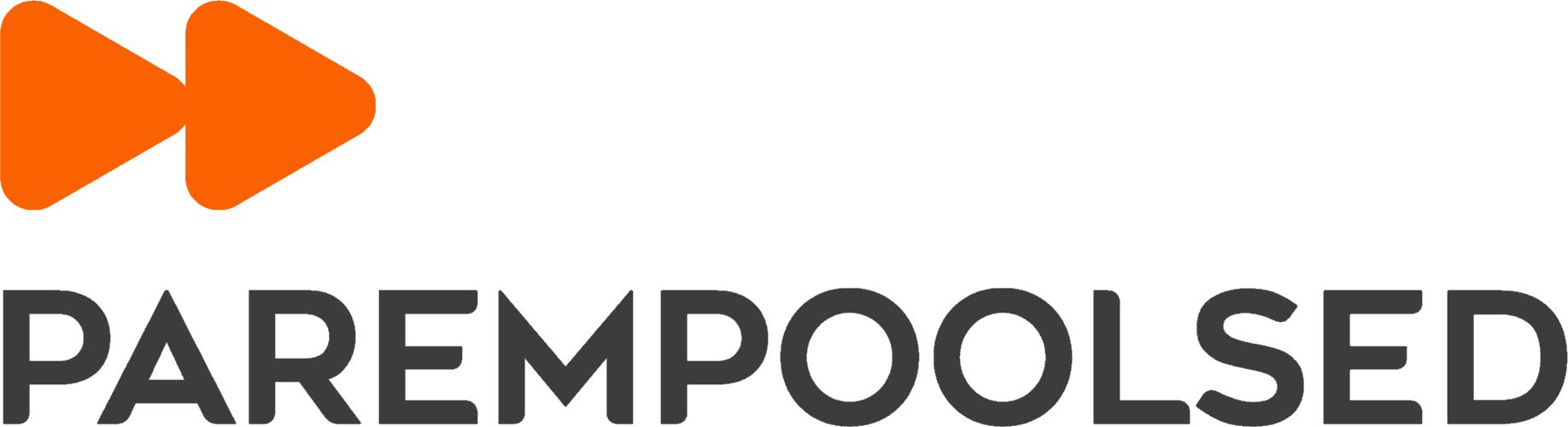
- Abbreviation: PP
- Leader: Lavly Perling
- Founded: 18 August 2022
- Split from: Isamaa
- Youth wing: Parempoolsed Noored
- Membership (2025): ▲732
- Ideology: Economic liberalism; Right-libertarianism; Pro-Europeanism
- Political position: Centre-right to right-wing
- Colours: Orange
- Riigikogu: 1 / 101
- European Parliament: 0 / 7
- Municipalities: 25 / 1,688

Website
- parempoolsed.ee

Erakond Parempoolsed (PP, lit. 'the Party of the Right-wingers') is a self-declared economically liberal political party in Estonia.

The party is reprented in the parliament by Kalev Stoicescu.

== History ==
The party was formed in August 2022, mostly by a group of former members of the Isamaa party.

The party gained its first member in the Riigikogu, Siim Valmar Kiisler, when he joined in September 2022.

In the 2023 elections Kiisler was not re-elected and the party lost its seat in the parliament.

The party gained another member in the Riigikogu, Kalev Stoicescu, when he joined in August 2026. He had previously left Estonia 200.

== Ideology ==
Parempoolsed is a centre-right party, and has been described as economically liberal. It also claims to oppose "bureaucracy", "populism", and what it views as a recent "left turn" in Estonian politics. It has also claimed that "freedom is the antidote to socialism".

It has called for more privatisation and competition in health care and some other state companies, as well as fiscal responsibility, lowering taxation in general, continuation of a simple tax system and an e-government. The party wants to lower the VAT rate from 24% to 20% and the income tax rate from 22% to 18%. The party backs free trade, flexibilization of the work laws, more responsibility to people, families and private initiative and deregulation and debureaucratization of the Estonian economy. It supports immigration, stating that "conservative policy does not consist in denying immigration", while saying this should be managed "based on the interests of Estonia's economy and security". The party supports the decentralization of power in the counties. The party wants to abolish the national minimum wage.

Parempoolsed self-identifies as a classical liberal and pro-individual party and advocates the power of the individual in building a prosperous and rich Estonia, claiming that the state must interfere as little as possible in people's lives. It also intends to limit "the state's collection of data concerning people's private lives". According to Postimees' 2025 electoral compass, the party's leader Lavly Perling, has no opinion on marriage equality but supports same-sex adoption rights. She opposes restrictions on hate speech.

Its leaders have repeatedly declared support for Estonia's continued membership of the European Union and its common market, as well as NATO. The party supports Ukraine and boosting Estonia's defence spending in light of the 2022 Russian invasion of Ukraine.

== Election results ==
=== Parliamentary elections ===
Election	Leader	Votes	%	Seats	+/−	Government
2023	Lavly Perling	14,037	2.3 (#8)	0 / 101	New	Extra-parliamentary

=== European Parliament elections ===
Election	List leader	Votes	%	Seats	+/−	EP Group
2024	Lavly Perling	25,189	6.84 (#6)	0 / 7	New	−
