= 2004 European Parliament election in Estonia =

13 June 2004	2009 →

All 6 Estonian seats to the European Parliament
- Turnout: 26.8%
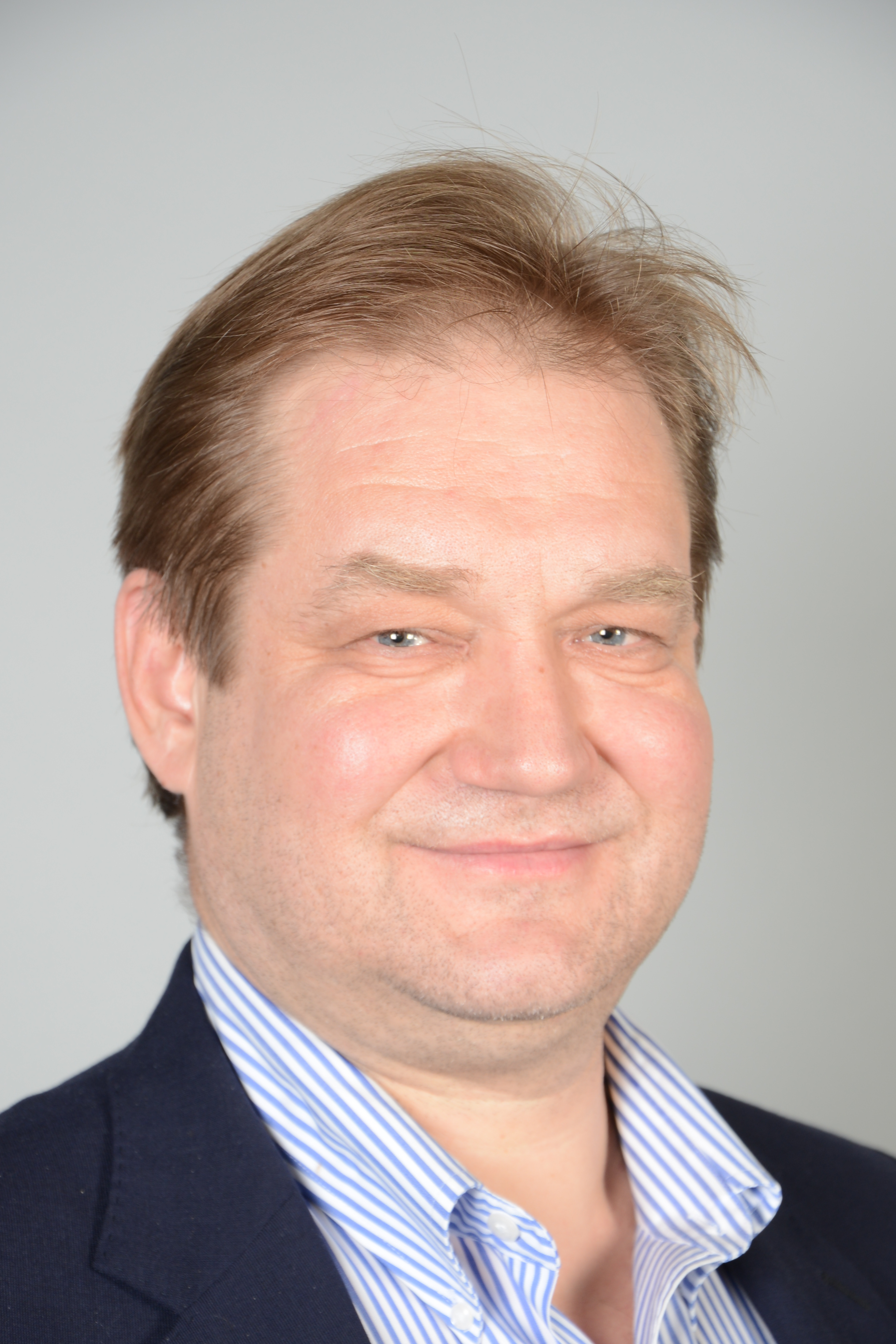

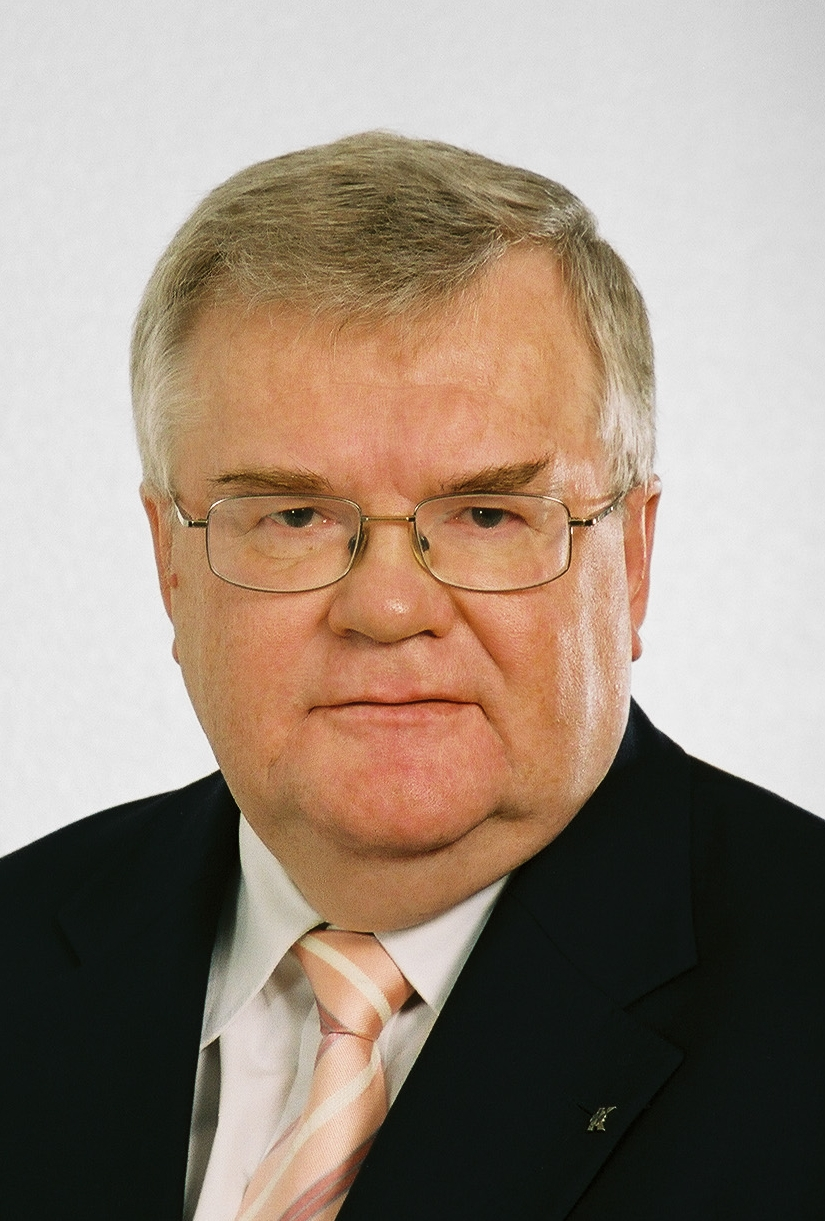

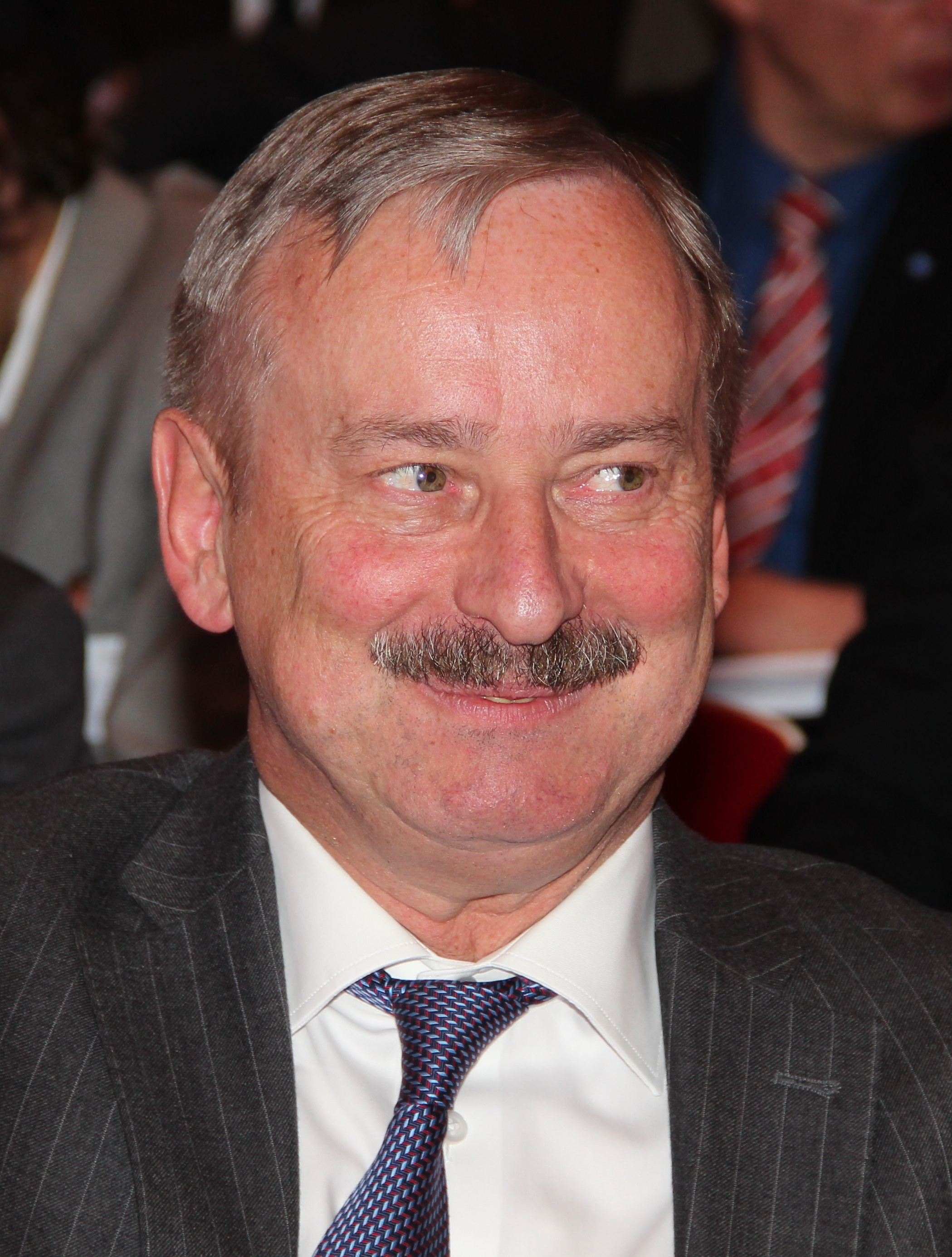

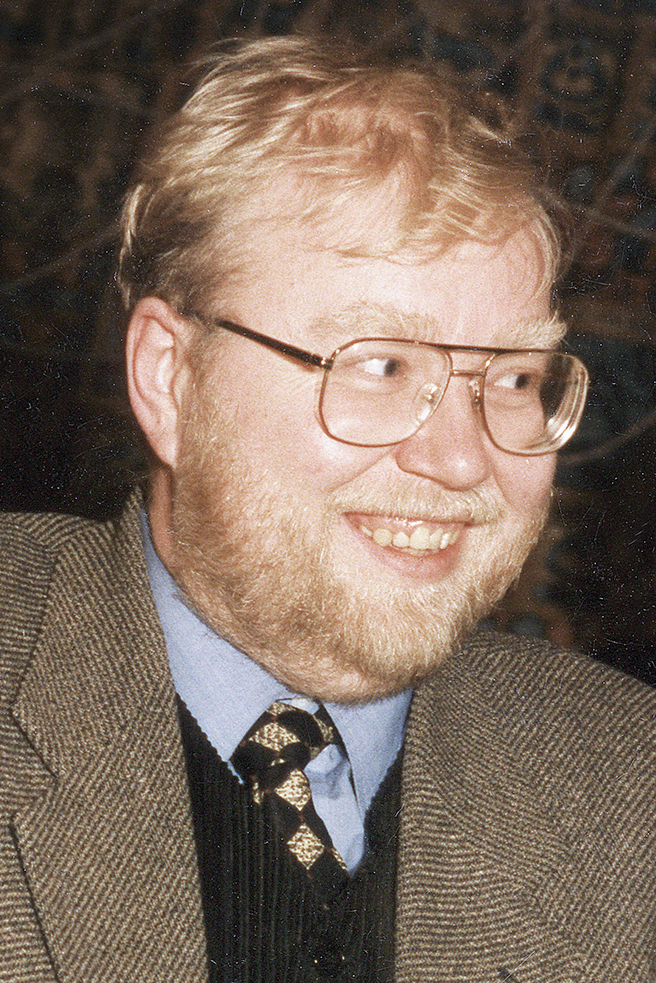
	First party	Second party	Third party
Leader	Ivari Padar	Edgar Savisaar	Siim Kallas
Party	SDE	Estonian Centre Party	Reform
Alliance	PES	ALDE	ALDE
Seats won	3	1	1
Popular vote	85,433	40,704	28,377
Percentage	36.8%	17.5%	12.2%
	Fourth party
Leader	Mart Laar
Party	Pro Patria Union
Alliance	EPP-ED
Seats won	1
Popular vote	24,375
Percentage	10.5%
- Results by county

An election for Members of the European Parliament representing Estonia constituency for the 2004–2009 term of the European Parliament was held on 13 June 2004. It was the first European Parliament election in Estonia following its admission to the European Union in May 2004. It was part of the wider 2004 European election.

The election was conducted using the D'Hondt method with open list. The voter turnout in Estonia was one of the lowest of all member countries at only 26.8%. A similar trend was visible in most of the new member states that joined the EU in 2004.

The biggest winner was the Social Democratic Party, due to the popularity of their leading candidate Toomas Hendrik Ilves, who received the vast majority of the party's votes. The governing Res Publica Party and People's Union polled poorly. Ilves went on to become President of Estonia in October 2006, leaving his MEP seat to Katrin Saks.

== Results ==
Party	Votes	%	Seats
Social Democratic Party	85,433	36.79	3
Estonian Centre Party	40,704	17.53	1
Estonian Reform Party	28,377	12.22	1
Pro Patria Union	24,375	10.50	1
People's Union of Estonia	18,692	8.05	0
Res Publica Party	15,458	6.66	0
Estonian Democratic Party	2,849	1.23	0
Estonian Pensioners' Party	1,329	0.57	0
Social Democratic Labour Party	1,057	0.46	0
Russian Party in Estonia	805	0.35	0
Independents	13,162	5.67	0
Total	232,241	100.00	6
Valid votes	232,241	99.04	
Invalid/blank votes	2,244	0.96	
Total votes	234,485	100.00	
Registered voters/turnout	873,809	26.83	
Source: VVK
