= Constitution of Estonia =

Fundamental law of Estonia

The Constitution of Estonia (Estonian: Eesti Vabariigi põhiseadus) is the fundamental law of the Republic of Estonia and establishes the state order as that of a democratic republic where the supreme power is vested in its citizens. The first Constitution was adopted by the freely elected Estonian Constituent Assembly on 15 June 1920 and came into force on 21 December 1920. Heavily amended on 24 January 1934, following a referendum in 1933, it was in force until the second Constitution was enacted on 1 January 1938. It remained in force, de facto, until 16 June 1940, when the Soviet Union occupied Estonia and, de jure, until 28 June 1992, when the third and current Constitution of the Republic of Estonia was adopted by referendum.

== History ==
=== First Constitution (1920–1933/38) ===
The first Constitution reflected Jean-Jacques Rousseau's idea of national sovereignty. Power was split between the judiciary, the executive and the legislature according to the principles of Montesquieu. The Constitution provided for a high degree of public initiative and referendums, and made provisions for cultural autonomy. Despite the Constitution being modelled upon Montesquieu's ideas, there was an imbalance in the distribution of power. The document was radically parliamentarian, vesting the single-chamber Riigikogu with extensive power over the executive and the judiciary, leading to instability and frequent changes of government. A State Elder served as both head of state and head of government.

Due to chronic government instability (18 governments headed by 10 men from 1920 to 1934), attempts were made to redraft the Constitution. In a referendum held in 1932, voters rejected two proposed drafts of a new Constitution. Still, a constitutional amendment, proposed by the populist Estonian War of Independence Veterans' League (Vaps movement) was adopted in a referendum in 1933 and came into force on 24 January 1934. This amendment, which turned the State Elder into a directly elected Head of State vested with broad powers, while separating the role of Prime Minister from the State Elder and reducing the size and power of the Riigikogu, had such a vast impact on the governing system that it is frequently mistaken for a new constitution ("the 1934 Constitution") in its own right. The State Elder had the power to issue decrees with the force of law. In order to prevent the Vaps movement from coming to power under this new Constitution, Konstantin Päts, who was serving as "Prime Minister in Duties of the State Elder" pending elections, retained power in a bloodless self-coup on 12 March 1934. Believing that the amended constitution was too authoritarian, Päts pressed for the adoption of a new Constitution.

=== Second Constitution (1938–1940/92) ===
In 1936, a referendum approved the formation of a National Assembly to draft a replacement document. This Constitution, which came into force on 1 January 1938, created a bicameral National Assembly, consisting of the Chamber of Deputies and the National Council. The National Council, which was to review and ratify legislation from the Chamber of Deputies, consisted of representatives from local government, professional and vocational bodies, and high officials. At the same time, the Chamber of Deputies was directly elected by the people. The head of state was given the title of "President"; he was no longer directly elected by the people, but instead was chosen by an electoral college consisting of both chambers of the National Assembly and additional representatives of local government. The President was vested with fairly broad powers (including the power to veto legislation passed by parliament), but was somewhat less powerful than the State Elder under the 1934 amendments.

A Stalinist-style "constitution" was introduced illegally, not having been subjected to referendum as required by the 1938 Constitution, by a Soviet-backed puppet government on 25 August 1940, a few weeks after Estonia had been invaded and occupied by, and annexed into, the Soviet Union. It was based on the 1936 Soviet constitution. The Soviet Estonian 1940 constitution was replaced by another constitution in 1978, based on the 1977 Soviet constitution.

In 1990, the Supreme Soviet of Estonia declared the 1940 takeover illegal and partly restored the 1938 Constitution as part of a transition to de facto independence.

=== Third Constitution (1992–present) ===
The present Constitution was enacted after a referendum on 28 June 1992. It incorporates elements of the Constitutions of 1920 and 1938. While retaining the presidency created in 1938, it restores the unicameral legislature established in 1920. It explicitly asserts the continuity of the current state with the Estonian state as it existed between 1918 and 1940. Indeed, it was adopted by a referendum, in accordance with the 1938 document. Like the 1920 Constitution, the head of state—titled President after some debate about restoring the old title of State Elder—is a largely ceremonial post. However, like the 1938 Constitution, the government is headed by a separate Prime Minister.

==== Accession to the European Union ====
The Constitution of the Republic of Estonia Amendment Act, passed by the 2003 Estonian European Union membership referendum under section 162 of the 1992 Constitution, enabled Estonia to join the European Union.

== Preamble and provisions ==
The current Constitution contains a preamble and 15 chapters of provisions. The preamble reads:

With unwavering faith and a steadfast will to strengthen and develop the state,

which is established on the inextinguishable right of the people of Estonia to national self-determination and which was proclaimed on 24 February 1918,

which is founded on liberty, justice and law,

which shall protect internal and external peace, and is a pledge to present and future generations for their social progress and welfare,

which shall guarantee the preservation of the Estonian nation, language and culture through the ages,

the people of Estonia, on the basis of § 1 of the Constitution which entered into force in 1938, and by a referendum held on 28 June 1992, adopted the following Constitution.

— Preamble of the Constitution of Estonia (1992)

=== Provisions ===
The current Constitution contains 15 chapters.

- The first chapter makes general provision for the nature of the state. It contains seven articles.
- The second chapter sets out the people's rights, liberties and duties.
- Chapter 3 defines the people and citizenship of Estonia.
- Chapter 4 deals with the Estonian Parliament (Riigikogu).
- Chapter 5 pertains to the President of Estonia, and his or her duties, responsibilities and rights.
- Chapter 6 addresses the Government of Estonia.
- Chapter 7 addresses the process of legislation.
- Chapter 8 addresses financial issues and the budget.
- Chapter 9 addresses international relations and treaties.
- Chapter 10 addresses military affairs.
- Chapter 11 pertains to the function and the role of National Audit Office, and the Auditor General.
- Chapter 12 pertains to the rights, functions and appointment of the Chancellor of Justice.
- Chapter 13 pertains to the structure and operation of the judicial system and the courts.
- Chapter 14 pertains to the jurisdictional, administrative and budgetary aspects of local government in Estonia.
- Chapter 15 pertains to mechanisms and procedures related to amending the Constitution.

== Fifteenth anniversary of the 1992 Constitution ==
For the celebrations of the fifteenth anniversary of the current Constitution in 2007, A. Le Coq produced a new brand of beer, the Constitutional Pilsener (Estonian: Põhiseaduse Pilsner) in cooperation with the Estonian Ministry of Justice.

== See also ==
- Constitutional law
- Constitutionalism
- Constituent assembly
- Estonian Declaration of Independence
