= Riigikogu =

Unicameral legislature of Estonia

Coordinates: 59°26′09″N 24°44′14″E

Parliament of Estonia Riigikogu
- 15th Riigikogu

Type
- Type: Unicameral

History
- Founded: 23 April 1919; 107 years ago 21 October 1992; 34 years ago (re-established)
- Disbanded: 1940–1991

Leadership
- Chairman: Lauri Hussar, Estonia 200 since 10 April 2023
- First Vice-Chairman: Toomas Kivimägi, Reform since 10 April 2023
- Second Vice-Chairman: Arvo Aller, EKRE since 15 July 2024

Structure
- Seats: 101
- Political groups: (Note: Members of the Riigikogu are formally not allowed to change their group membership to a parliamentary group of another party in the middle of the term. Therefore, party-switching MPs often end up labelled as "Non-affiliated members" despite being so in name only. For that reason, this list of political group membership is based on both formal party membership, verifiable in the Business Register, and formal and informal caucusing in the Riigikogu.) Government (50) Reform (38) E200 (12) Opposition (51) SDE (14) Isamaa (12) Centre (10) EKRE (9) PP (1) ERK (1) Independents (4)
- Committees: 11 Committees: Constitutional; Cultural Affairs; Economic Affairs; Environment; European Union Affairs; Finance; Foreign Affairs; Legal Affairs; National Defence; Rural Affairs; Social Affairs

Elections
- Voting system: Party-list proportional representation Modified D'Hondt method
- First election: 27–29 November 1920 20 September 1992
- Last election: 5 March 2023
- Next election: By 7 March 2027

Meeting place
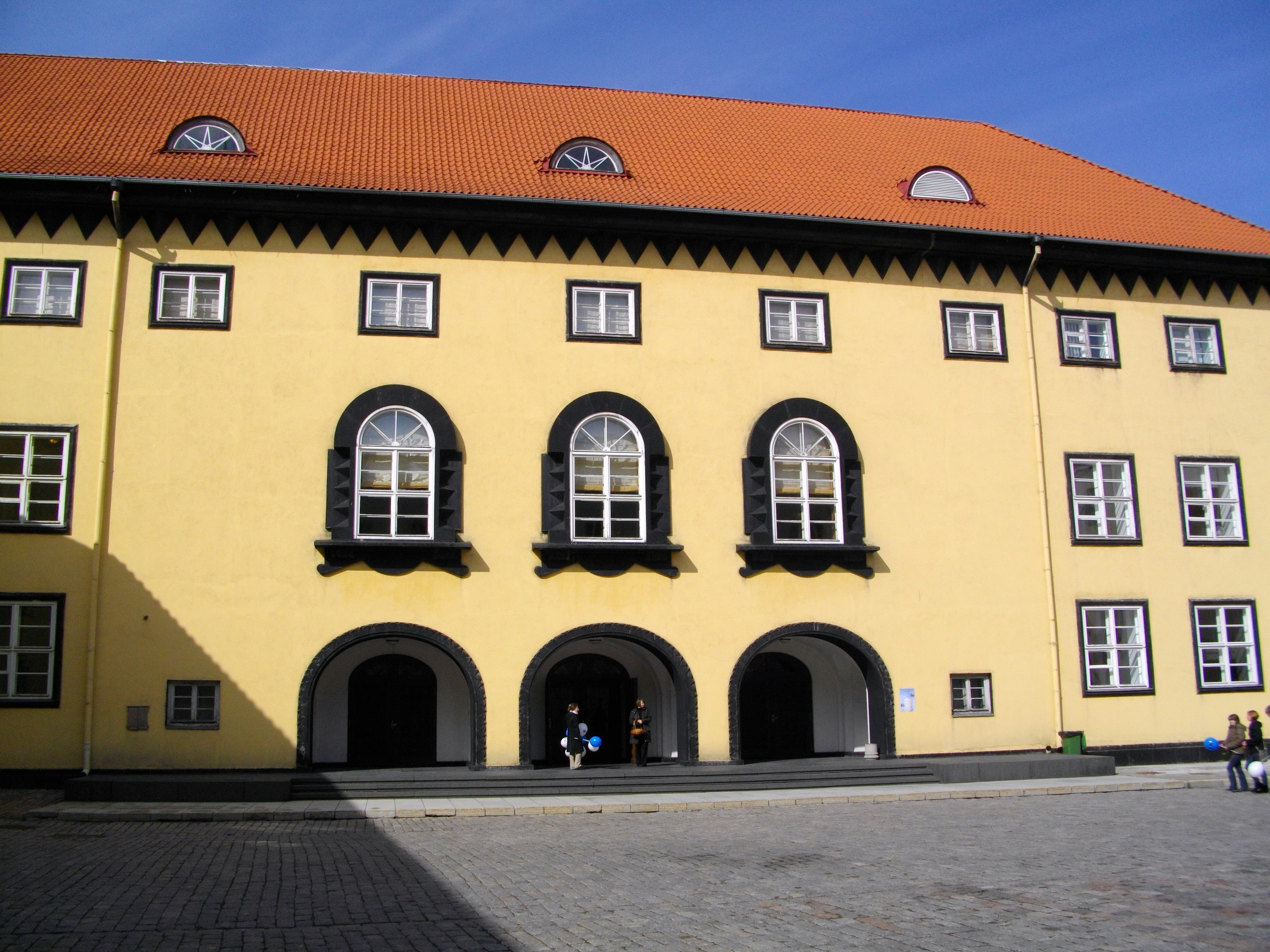
- Parliament building in Toompea Castle, Tallinn

Website
- www.riigikogu.ee

The Riigikogu (Estonian: [ˈriːkiˈkoku], from Estonian riigi-, "of the state", and kogu, "assembly") is the unicameral parliament of Estonia. In addition to approving legislation, the Parliament appoints high officials, including the prime minister and chief justice of the Supreme Court, and elects (either alone or, if necessary, together with representatives of local government within a broader electoral college) the president. Among its other tasks, the Riigikogu also ratifies significant foreign treaties that impose military and proprietary obligations and bring about changes in law, as well as approves the budget presented by the government as law, and monitors the executive power.

== History ==
=== History ===
23 April 1919, the opening session of the Estonian Constituent Assembly, is considered the founding date of the Parliament of Estonia. Established under the 1920 constitution, the Riigikogu had 100 members elected for a three-year term on the basis of proportional representation. Elections were fixed for the first Sunday in May of the third year of parliament. The first elections to the Riigikogu took place in 1920. From 1923 to 1932, there were four more elections to the Riigikogu. The elections were on a regional basis, without any threshold in the first two elections, but from 1926 a moderate threshold (2%) was used. The sessions of the Riigikogu take place in the Toompea Castle, where a new building in an unusual Expressionist style was erected in the former courtyard of the medieval castle in 1920–1922.

In 1933, amendments to the first Constitution were approved by referendum, where more power was given to an executive President. The following year, the President used these new powers to adjourn parliament and declared martial law to avert an alleged coup. In 1937, a second constitution was approved by referendum which saw the introduction of a two chambered legislature, the Chamber of Deputies (Riigivolikogu) and the State Council (Riiginõukogu). Elections were subsequently held in 1938 where only individual candidates were allowed to run.

During the subsequent periods of Soviet occupation (1940–41), German occupation (1941–44), and the second Soviet occupation (1944–1991) the Parliament was disbanded. The premises of the Riigikogu were used by the Supreme Soviet of the Estonian SSR during the second Soviet occupation.

=== Restitution of independence ===
In September 1992, a year after Estonia had regained its independence from the Soviet Union, elections to the Parliament took place on the basis of the third Constitution of Estonia adopted in a referendum in the summer of the same year. The 1992 constitution, which incorporates elements of the 1920 and 1938 Constitutions and explicitly asserts its continuity with the Estonian state as it existed between 1918 and 1940, sees the return of a unicameral parliament with 101 members. Under the 1992 constitution (§59), the Riigikogu holds the legislative power in parliament.

The most recent parliamentary elections were held on 5 March 2023. The main differences between the current system and a pure political representation, or proportional representation, system are the established 5% national threshold, and the use of a modified D'Hondt formula (the divisor is raised to the power 0.9). This modification makes for more disproportionality than does the usual form of the formula.

== Election process ==
All Estonian citizens who are over the age of 18 have the active legal capacity and active legal right to vote. The passive right to vote, or the ability for a person to be elected into the Riigikogu, is held by all Estonian citizens over the age of 21 who have the active right to vote. Each Riigikogu is elected for a term of 4 years. If no party gains the majority, or 51 seats, parliamentary groups will unite in a coalition to form government. The remaining groups would then present as the opposition. The Riigikogu has 101 members, which is approximately the cube root of the total population in Estonia who have the right to vote.

Each of the 101 members of the Riigikogu are decided by an election which takes place on the first Sunday of March every 4 years. The voting process is conducted via a secret ballot, and the people of Estonia can vote in 14 different ways including electronic voting. The specific 14 number of voting types comes from the mathematical combinations that are possible as dictated by the Riigikogu election act.

== Latest election ==
Party	Votes	%	+/–	Seats	+/–
Estonian Reform Party	190,632	31.24	+2.31	37	+3
Conservative People's Party of Estonia	97,966	16.05	−1.71	17	−2
Estonian Centre Party	93,254	15.28	−7.82	16	−10
Estonia 200	81,329	13.33	+8.97	14	+14
Social Democratic Party	56,584	9.27	−0.56	9	−1
Isamaa	50,118	8.21	−3.23	8	−4
Estonian United Left Party	14,605	2.39	+2.30	0	0
Parempoolsed	14,037	2.30	New	0	New
Estonian Greens	5,886	0.96	−0.86	0	0
Independents	5,888	0.96	+0.68	0	0
Total	610,299	100.00	–	101	0
Valid votes	610,299	99.43			
Invalid/blank votes	3,502	0.57			
Total votes	613,801	100.00			
Registered voters/turnout	966,129	63.53			
Source: National Electoral Committee

== Current seat allocation ==
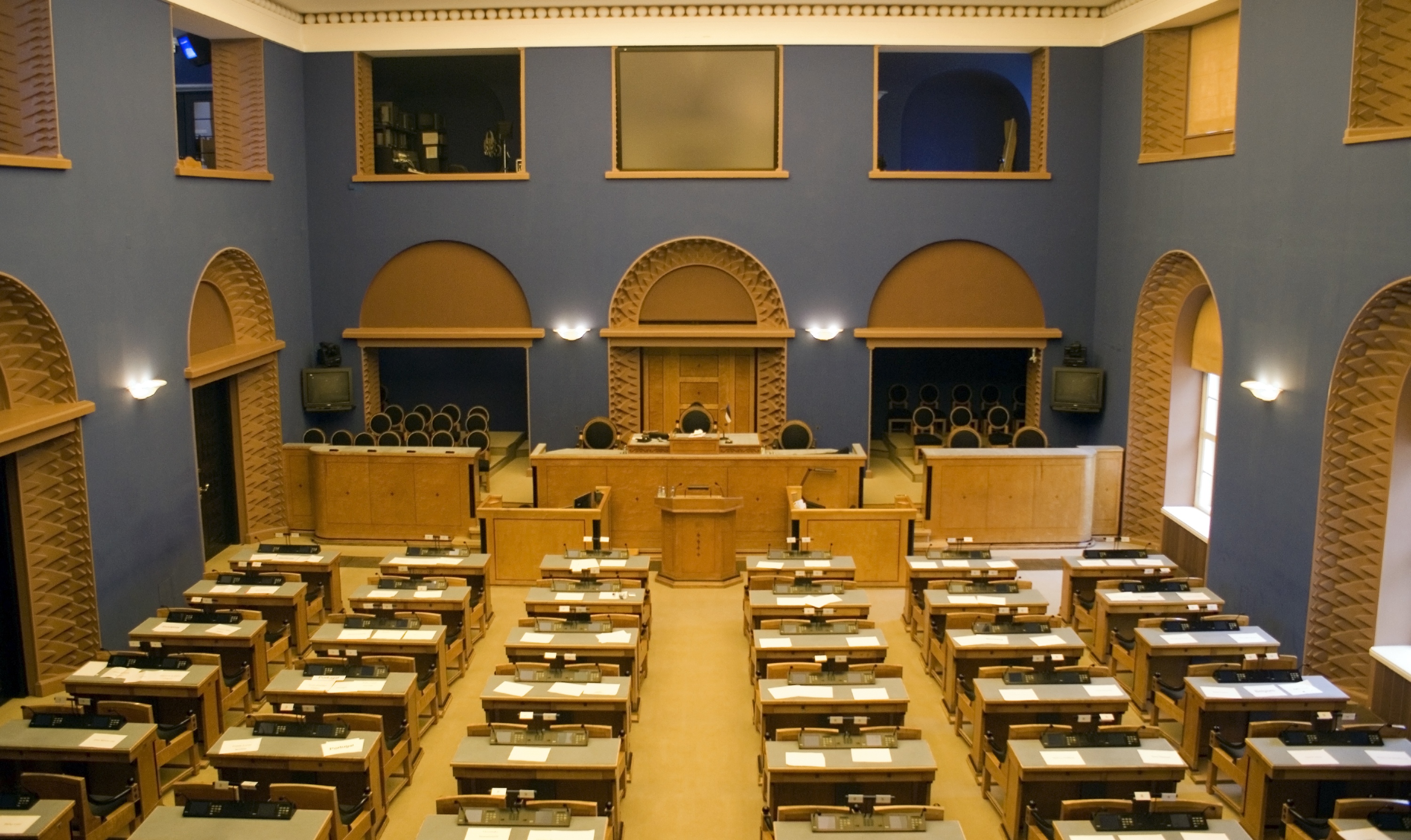
Session hall.

The seat allocation refers to de facto allocation, as defectors from fractions are not allowed to join other ones between elections.

- Reform Party 38
  - party leader: Kristen Michal
- Social Democratic Party of Estonia 14
  - party leader: Lauri Läänemets
- Estonia 200 12
  - party leader: Kristina Kallas
- Isamaa 11
  - party leader: Urmas Reinsalu
- Conservative People's Party of Estonia 9
  - party leader: Martin Helme
- Centre Party 8
  - party leader: Mihhail Kõlvart
- Independents 8

== Structure of former legislatures ==
Estonian Parliament after 1992 election

29	17	15	12	10	8	8	1	1
Isamaa	Safe Home	Popular Front	Moderates	Independence	ERP	Citizen	Greens	EEE

Estonian Parliament after 1995 election

41	19	16	8	6	6	5
Coalition/Country	Reform	Centre	RKEI and ERSP	Moderates	Home	Right

Estonian Parliament after 1999 election

28	18	18	17	7	7	6
Centre	Pro Patria	Reform	Moderates	Coalition	Country	United

Estonian Parliament after 2003 election

28	28	19	13	7	6
Centre	Res Publica	Reform	People's Union	Pro Patria	Moderates

Estonian Parliament after 2007 election

31	29	19	10	6	6
Reform	Centre	IRL	SDE	Greens	People's Union

Estonian Parliament after 2011 election

33	26	23	19
Reform	Centre	IRL	SDE

Estonian Parliament after 2015 election

30	27	15	14	8	7
Reform	Centre	SDE	IRL	EVA	EKRE

Estonian Parliament after 2019 election

34	26	19	12	10
Reform	Centre	EKRE	Isamaa	SDE

Estonian Parliament after 2023 election

37	17	16	14	9	8
Reform	EKRE	Centre	E200	SDE	Isamaa

== Speakers of the Riigikogu ==
The salary of the speaker is €8318.19 per month.

=== 1921–1937 ===
Name	Period	Legislature
Otto Strandman	4 January 1921 – 18 November 1921	I Riigikogu
Juhan Kukk	18 November 1921 – 20 November 1922	I Riigikogu
Konstantin Päts	20 November 1922 – 7 June 1923	I Riigikogu
Jaan Tõnisson	7 June 1923 – 27 May 1925	II Riigikogu
August Rei	9 June 1925 – 22 June 1926	II Riigikogu
Karl Einbund	22 June 1926 – 19 July 1932	III Riigikogu, IV Riigikogu, V Riigikogu
Jaan Tõnisson	19 July 1932 – 18 May 1933	V Riigikogu
Karl Einbund	18 May 1933 – 29 August 1934	V Riigikogu
Rudolf Penno	28 September 1934 – 31 December 1937	V Riigikogu

=== Speakers of the Riigivolikogu (lower chamber) ===
Name	Period	Legislature
Jüri Uluots	21 April 1938 – 12 October 1939	VI Riigikogu
Otto Pukk	17 October 1939 – 5 July 1940	VI Riigikogu
Arnold Veimer	21 July 1940 – 25 August 1940	

=== Speaker of the Riiginõukogu (upper chamber) ===
Name	Period	Legislature
Mihkel Pung	21 April 1938 – 5 July 1940	VI Riigikogu

=== Chairman of the Supreme Council (1990–1992) ===
Name	Period
Arnold Rüütel	29 March 1990 – 5 October 1992

=== Speaker of the Supreme Council (1990–1992) ===
Name	Period
Ülo Nugis	29 March 1990 – 5 October 1992

=== Since 1992 ===
Name	Period	Legislature
Ülo Nugis	21 October 1992 – 21 March 1995	VII Riigikogu
Toomas Savi	21 March 1995 – 31 March 2003	VIII Riigikogu, IX Riigikogu
Ene Ergma	31 March 2003 – 23 March 2006	X Riigikogu
Toomas Varek	23 March 2006 – 2 April 2007	X Riigikogu
Ene Ergma	2 April 2007 – 20 March 2014	XI Riigikogu, XII Riigikogu
Eiki Nestor	20 March 2014 – 4 April 2019	XII Riigikogu, XIII Riigikogu
Henn Põlluaas	4 April 2019 – 18 March 2021	XIV Riigikogu
Jüri Ratas	18 March 2021 – 10 April 2023	XIV Riigikogu
Lauri Hussar	10 April 2023 – present	XV Riigikogu

== Chancellery ==
Established on October 5 of 1992, the Chancellery of the Riigikogu (Estonian: Riigikogu Kantselei) is the administration supporting the Riigikogu in the performance of its constitutional functions. The departments of the Chancellery perform the daily functions.

According to the Routledge Handbook for Parliamentary Administration, the main functions of the chancellery are:

1. Advising members of the Riigikogu on legislative matters including researching and proposing new systems and practices of parliamentary democracy.
2. Provides administrative services to the Riigikogu
3. Assists the Riigikogu in communicating with the public, including other Estonian government bodies and similar bodies in other nations.
4. Prepares and implements budgets for the Riigikogu, administers its state assets as set out in the State Assets Act, represents the Riigikogu during legal proceedings and in interactions with other institutions of the government.
5. Provides services for the National Electoral Committee as well as the Political Parties Financing Surveillance Committee

== See also ==
- List of members of the Parliament of Estonia
- Chairman of the Supreme Soviet of the Estonian Soviet Socialist Republic

== Notes ==
=== Cited sources ===
- Miljan, Toivo (2004). Historical Dictionary of Estonia. Maryland, US: Scarecrow Press. ISBN 0-8108-4904-6.
