= Estonia 200 =

Political party in Estonia

Estonia 200 Eesti 200
- Abbreviation: E200
- Leader: Kristina Kallas
- Founder: Kristina Kallas
- Founded: 3 November 2018; 8 years ago
- Membership (2025): ▼731
- Ideology: Liberalism (Estonian); Pro-Europeanism
- Political position: Centre to centre-right
- Colours: Indigo
- Slogan: Pikk plaan Eestile ('A Long-term Plan for Estonia')
- Riigikogu: 13 / 101
- European Parliament: 0 / 7
- Municipalities: 3 / 1,688

Party flag

Website
- eesti200.ee

Estonia 200 (Estonian: Eesti 200, E200) is a liberal political party in Estonia. Since 2024, the party has been a junior partner in the Michal cabinet.

== History ==
=== Formation and 2019 elections ===
In 2017, the initiators of the movement began discussing Estonia's future. The movement's formal foundation arguably took place on 2 May 2018, when their manifesto was first published. According to a mid-June 2018 poll conducted by Turu-uuringute AS, 15% of voters were ready to vote for the movement in the 2019 parliamentary elections.

On 30 May 2018, former Põlva County governor Igor Taro was appointed rural area coordinator of the movement. On 7 June, the initiators announced that Henrik Raave would lead Eesti 200, and the following day, the manifesto authors registered it as a nonprofit organisation. Its founders were Raave, Taro, as well as Priit Alamäe, Kristiina Tõnnisson, Indrek Nuume and Kristina Kallas, who was elected council head. On 7 August, news broke that Margus Tsahkna, former leader of the Pro Patria party, was set to join Eesti 200.

On 21 August 2018, the Estonia 200 movement decided to form a party later that fall and participate in the March 2019 parliamentary elections. On 3 November, the day the movement became a party, Kristina Kallas was elected as its first chairperson.

Despite initial optimism, in the 2019 parliamentary election the party managed to garner a mere 4.36% of the vote, falling short of the 5% threshold and therefore failing to get any seats in parliament.

In the 2019 European Parliament election, the party earned 3.66% of the vote, failing to secure any of the Estonian seats in the European parliament.

=== Rise in popularity and entering government ===
In the 2021 municipal elections, the party garnered over 6% of the vote nationwide and significant representation in councils of major Estonian cities such as Tallinn, Tartu and Narva.

On 15 October 2022, Lauri Hussar defeated Kristina Kallas in the party's leadership election and became chair.

In the 2023 parliamentary election, Estonia 200 received 13.3% of the vote and 14 seats in the Riigikogu. Following the election on 7 March, Prime Minister and Reform Party leader Kaja Kallas invited Estonia 200 and the Social Democratic Party for preliminary talks aimed at forming a new coalition government. A coalition agreement between the three parties was reached by 7 April, giving E200 three ministerial seats, and was officially signed on 10 April. On 17 April, the third Kallas government was formally sworn into office.

=== Time in government and decline in popularity ===
During the European Parliament elections in 2024 the party suffered a crushing defeat, gaining only 2.6% of the popular vote and zero seats.

Subsequently, Margus Tsahkna announced he would be stepping down from party leadership. In August 2024, the party re-elected Kristina Kallas as party leader.

In November 2024, Margus Tsahkna stated that the party should be "ready to join another party".

The party suffered another significant defeat at the 2025 municipal elections, with its share of the national vote dropping to 1.7%. Yet, despite losing representation in all municipal councils except Tartu city council, party leader Kristina Kallas described the result as "better than expected."

== Ideology and platform ==
Estonia 200 describes itself as a liberal and progressive party, and has been described as centrist and adhering to both social and economic liberalism. It is pro-NATO and pro-European, supports same-sex marriage, and considers internet access a human right. The party supports community-based investments in renewable energy sources and creating a bond for green funding. It advocates the inclusion of mental health lessons in school curricula, as well as reserving 1% of local budgets for investment projects chosen by residents. Estonia 200 also calls for local government bodies to comprise a mixture of politicians, experts and representatives of interest groups. In addition, it intends to decrease public funding for all political parties.

== Election results ==
=== Parliamentary elections ===
Election	Leader	Votes	%	Seats	+/−	Status
2019	Kristina Kallas	24,447	4.4 (#6)	0 / 101	New	No seats
2023	Lauri Hussar	81,329	13.3 (#4)	14 / 101	▲14	Coalition

=== European Parliament elections ===
Election	List leader	Votes	%	Seats	+/−	EP Group
2019	Lauri Hussar	10,700	3.22 (#6)	0 / 7	New	−
2024	Margus Tsahkna	9,584	2.60 (#8)	0 / 7	Steady	−
