= Opinion polling for the 2023 Estonian parliamentary election =

In the run up to the 2023 Estonian parliamentary election, various organisations carried out opinion polling to gauge voting intention in Estonia. The date range for these opinion polls are from the 2019 Estonian parliamentary election held on 3 March. Poll results are listed in the table below in reverse chronological order, showing the most recent first. The highest percentage figure in each poll is displayed in bold, and the background shaded in the leading party's colour. In the instance that there is a tie, then no figure is shaded.

== Poll trackers ==
Trackers of voting intentions and other election-related polling:

- Europe Elects
- Politico
- Politpro
- ERR (in Estonian)
- Reitingud (in Estonian)

== Graphical summary ==
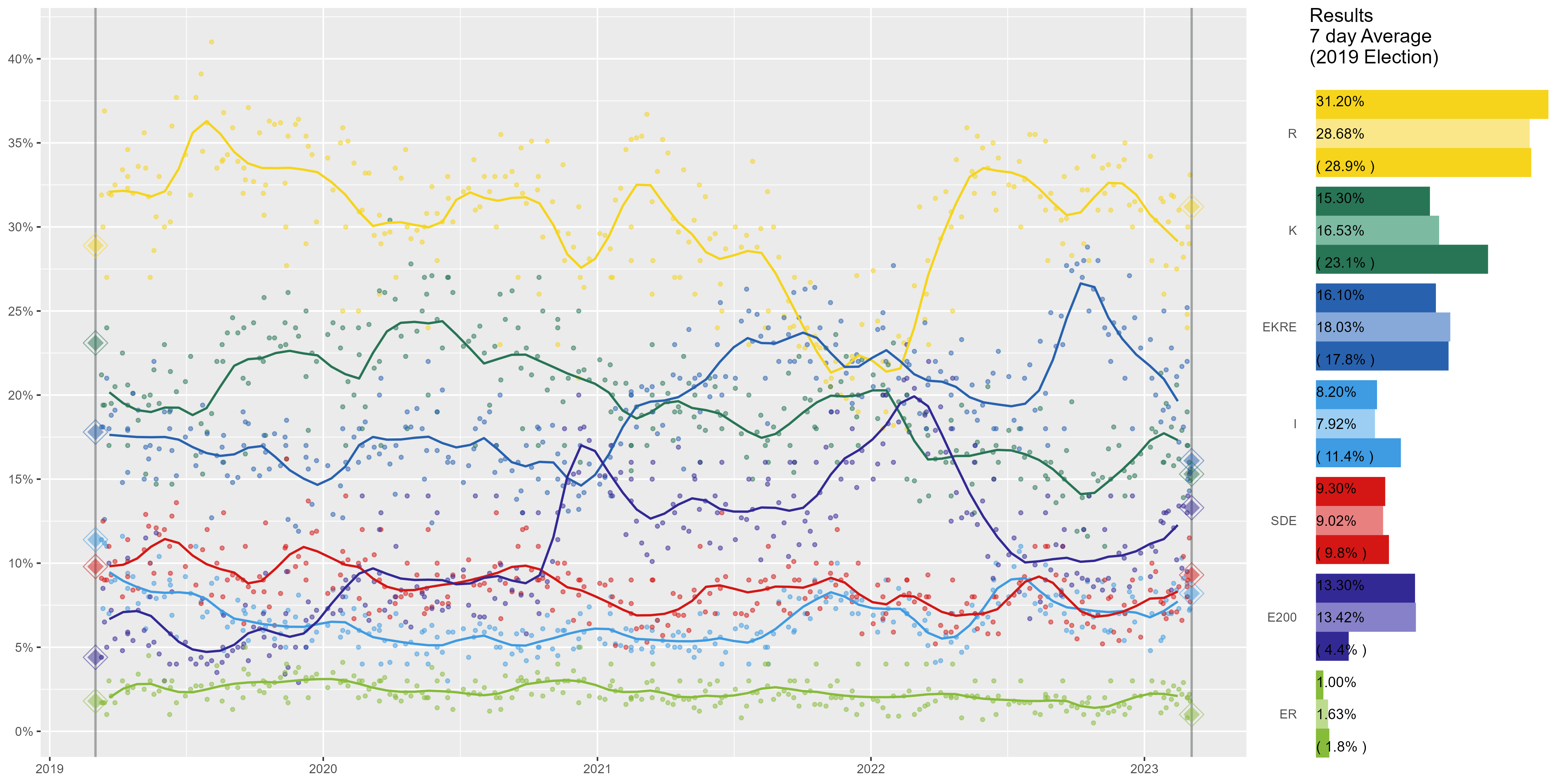

== Polling results ==
=== 2023 ===
Polling firm	Fieldwork Date	Sample size	Ref	Kesk	EKRE	Isamaa	SDE	E200	EER	Parem	Others	Lead	Gov.	Opp.
**Election Results**	**5 Mar**	**N/A**	**31.2**	**15.3**	**16.1**	**8.2**	**9.3**	**13.3**	**1.0**	**2.3**	**3.3**	**15.1**	**48.7**	**51.3**
**Election Results**	**5 Mar**	**N/A**	**37**	**16**	**17**	**8**	**9**	**14**	**0**	**0**		**8.0**	**54**	**47**
Norstat (Note: calculated numbers)	28 Feb-3 Mar	1,000	**33.1**	14.9	15.6	7.3	7.7	15.4	1.8	2.9	0.7	17.5	48.1	52.9
Kantar Emor	28 Feb-2 Mar	1,613	**29.0**	16.0	14.3	7.2	11.5	15.3	2.2	2.4	2.2	13.0	47.7	52.3
Turu-uuringute AS	20-28 Feb	600–700	**30**	17	15	8	9	14	2	3	2	13	47	51
Norstat	21-27 Feb	1,000	24.8	19.0	**25.2**	8.8	8.6	9.5	0.8	1.7	1.4	0.4	42.2	57.8
Faktum & Ariko	20-27 Feb	959	**24**	17	22	8	8	13	2	1	3 (Note: Independents 2%, Others (only EÜVP) 1%)	2	40	60
Kantar Emor	20-22 Feb	1,577	**28.2**	13.9	18.1	9.1	10.4	13.4	2.9	2.2	0.8	10.1	48.7	50.5
Norstat	14-20 Feb	1,000	**29.0**	17.9	21.7	10.3	6.6	9.7	2.2	1.3	1.3	7.3	45.9	52.8
Kantar Emor	13-16 Feb	1,595	**31.0**	16.2	17.2	7.3	8.6	13.4	2.5	2.1	1.8	13.8	46.9	51.4
Norstat	7-13 Feb	1,000	**27.5**	20.6	21.1	8.4	7.1	10.2	1.6	1.7	1.8	6.4	43	55.2
Kantar Emor	6-9 Feb	1,493	**31.8**	15.8	18.6	8.8	8.0	12.1	2.7	1.8	0.4	13.2	48.6	51.0
Norstat	31 Jan - 6 Feb	1,000	**31.9**	18.1	22.8	7.0	7.1	8.4	1.9	1.8	1.0	9.1	46	53
Kantar Emor	30 Jan - 2 Feb	1,554	**30.3**	16.4	19.3	7.0	8.3	13.1	2.4	1.6	1.7	11.0	45.6	52.8
Norstat	24-30 Jan	1,000	**27.7**	19.5	21.5	7.8	6.7	13.0	1.4	1.3	1.0	6.2	42.2	56.8
Turu-uuringute AS	27 Jan (Note: Publication date)	600–700	**26**	16	25	7	7	13	2	1	3	1	40	57
Kantar Emor	19-26 Jan	1,639	**31.5**	16.0	19.1	5.6	7.6	12.4	2.9	2.0	2.9	12.4	44.7	52.4
Norstat	17-23 Jan	1,000	**31.7**	21.3	18.4	5.4	7.7	12.5	1.1	1.4	0.5	10.4	44.8	54.7
Norstat	10-16 Jan	1,000	**30.4**	17.8	20.0	8.3	9.5	10.7	2.3	0.7	0.4	10.4	48.2	51.4
Kantar Emor	5-11 Jan	1,639	**28**	18	21	7	10	11	3	1	0	7	45	55
Norstat	2-9 Jan	1,000	**34.2**	16.9	23.3	4.8	8.4	9.2	2.2	0.6	0.5	8.9	47.4	52.1

=== 2022 ===
Polling firm	Fieldwork Date	Sample size	Ref	Kesk	EKRE	Isamaa	SDE	E200	EER	Parem	Others	Lead	Gov.	Opp.
Norstat	20-27 Dec	1,000	31.0	16.5	22.8	9.1	5.6	10.6	2.1	1.2	1.1	8.2	45.7	54.3
Norstat	13-19 Dec	1,000	31.5	15.2	24.6	6.5	7.7	9.6	2.1	0.4	1.6	6.9	45.7	54.3
Kantar Emor	8-16 Dec	1,510	30	16	18	8	9	14	3	1	0	12	47	52
Norstat	6-12 Dec	1,000	31.3	15.1	27.1	8.3	6.0	8.6	1.4	0.8	1.4	4.2	45.6	54.4
Turu-uuringute AS	6 Dec (Note: Publication date)	600–700	35	14	21	7	7	11	1	1	3	14	49	51
Norstat	29 Nov-5 Dec	1,000	34.0	15.5	24.0	5.4	7.5	10.3	1.6	1.1	0.6	10.0	46.9	53.1
Norstat	22-28 Nov	1,000	33.6	17.0	23.7	7.0	5.4	10.6	1.5	0.9	0.3	9.9	46.0	54.0
Norstat	15-21 Nov	1,000	32.5	18.1	24.3	8.7	5.9	8.4	1.2	0.3	0.6	8.2	47.1	52.9
Kantar Emor	10-17 Nov	1,512	31	15	22	6	8	14	3	1	0	9	45	55
Norstat	8-14 Nov	1,000	33.7	16.8	23.6	5.9	7.9	9.1	1.1	0.7	1.2	10.1	47.5	52.5
Turu-uuringute AS	9 Nov (Note: Publication date)	600–700	32	11	24	6	9	12	2	1	3	8	47	53
Norstat	1-6 Nov	1,000	33.5	15.1	25.7	8.9	5.2	8.4	1.3	1.1	0.8	7.8	47.6	52.4
Norstat	26-31 Oct	1,000	31.0	14.9	28.0	7.0	6.9	9.0	1.0	1.0	1.2	3.0	44.9	55.1
Norstat	18-25 Oct	1,000	34.2	15.3	26.3	6.8	6.2	8.6	0.5	0.8	1.3	7.9	47.2	52.8
Kantar Emor	13-19 Oct	1,469	28	14	25	7	8	14	2	1	1	3	43	56
Norstat	11-17 Oct	1,000	32.2	11.6	28.8	8.9	6.4	9.0	1.7	0.3	1.1	3.4	47.5	52.5
Turu-uuringute AS	12 Oct (Note: Publication date)	600–700	29	12	28	8	7	12	1	0	3	1	44	56
Norstat	4-10 Oct	1,000	32.2	13.9	27.0	6.2	7.7	9.1	1.7	0.8	2.2	5.2	46.1	51.7
Norstat	27 Sep-3 Oct	1,000	33.5	11.9	27.8	8.3	5.5	9.4	1.4	0.7	1.5	5.7	47.3	51.2
Norstat	20–26 Sep	1,000	28.3	19.6	27.4	5.9	6.3	8.7	1.5	0.6	1.7	0.9	40.5	57.8
Norstat	13–19 Sep	1,000	30.5	16.7	27.7	6.0	6.5	9.3	1.2	1.3	0.8	2.8	43.0	56.2
Turu-uuringute AS	16 Sep (Note: Publication date)	500–700	33	15	18	7	9	12	2	0.8	3.2	15	49	47.8
Kantar Emor	8-14 Sep	1,431	29	14	23	8	11	11	3	1	1	6	48	52
Norstat	6-12 Sep	1,000	30.4	15.4	24.7	8.4	8.3	8.1	1.7	—	3.1	5.7	47.1	40.1
Norstat	27 Aug-5 Sep	1,000	31.1	13.6	22.9	8.1	9.3	11.1	2.1	—	1.8	8.2	48.5	36.5
Norstat	23-29 Aug	1,000	32.0	16.0	24.9	7.5	6.5	9.6	1.5	0.9	1.1	7.1	46	54
Turu-uuringute AS	25 Aug (Note: Publication date)	600–700	28	15	17	8	11	14	2	—	5	11	47	46
Norstat	16-22 Aug	1,000	35.1	15.2	20.1	9.9	7.4	9.0	2.2	—	1.1	8.6	52.4	47.6
Kantar Emor	11-22 Aug	1,514	31	16	18	7	11	13	2	—	1 (Note: TULE)	12	49	51
	18 Aug		Dissidents split from Isamaa to form Parempoolsed											

Polling firm	Fieldwork Date	Sample size	Ref	Kesk	EKRE	Isamaa	SDE	E200	EER	Others	Lead	Gov.	Opp.
Norstat	9-15 Aug	1,000	**31.8**	19.2	23.2	7.2	8.0	7.7	1.0	1.9	8.6	47	53
Norstat	2-8 Aug	1,000	**35.5**	14.5	19.1	7.6	11	9.9	1.1	1.3	16.4	54.1	45.9
Norstat	25 Jul-1 Aug	1,000	**35.5**	16.6	21.8	9.0	8.5	6.7	1.7	0.2	13.7	53	47
Norstat	19-25 Jul	1,000	**32.8**	16.3	21.0	8.1	9.2	10.4	1.7	0.5	11.8	50.1	49.9
Kantar Emor	14–20 Jul	1,501	**30**	15	18	11	9	13	3	1	12	50	49
	18 Jul		**Kaja Kallas' second cabinet is formed by Reform, Isamaa and SDE**										
Norstat	12–18 Jul	1,000	**33.9**	18.0	16.8	10.7	8.8	8.3	1.7	1.8	15.9	33.9	66.1
Norstat	5–11 Jul	1,000	**32.4**	16.9	18.5	9.8	8.1	11.5	1.8	1.0	13.9	32.4	67.6
Norstat	27 Jun – 4 Jul	1,000	**32.5**	17.9	21.1	8.0	7.6	10.5	1.6	0.8	11.4	32.5	67.5
Norstat	14–20 Jun	1,000	**34.1**	16.0	22.6	7.6	5.8	9.9	2.1	1.9	11.5	34.1	65.9
Turu-uuringute AS	17 Jun (Note: Publication date)	600–700	**31**	17	18	10	8	12	1	3	13	31	55
Kantar Emor	9–14 Jun	1,537	**32**	15	18	9	8	15	3	0	14	32	68
Norstat	7–13 Jun	1,000	**35.0**	16.6	21.3	8.4	6.5	9.1	1.8	0.8	13.7	35.0	65.0
Norstat	1–6 Jun	1,000	**33.5**	20.5	20.8	6.8	5.8	10.4	2.0	0.2	12.7	33.5	66.5
	2 Jun		**The ministers of Kesk were dismissed**										
Norstat	24–30 May	1,000	**34.7**	16.7	19.4	6.4	7.0	13.7	0.7	1.4	15.3	52.4	47.6
Norstat	16–23 May	1,000	**35.4**	17.2	18.5	6.8	6.1	12.3	2.1	1.6	16.9	52.6	47.4
Kantar Emor	12–20 May	1,461	**33**	16	17	7	7	17	3	0	16	49	51
Turu-uuringute AS	19 May (Note: Publication date)	600–700	**32**	13	19	6	8	16	2	4	13	45	55
Norstat	10–16 May	1,000	**33.3**	14.7	20.6	7.5	8.0	12.9	2.1	0.9	12.7	48.0	52.0
Norstat	4–9 May	1,000	**35.9**	16.5	19.0	5.0	7.6	13.0	2.1	0.9	16.9	52.4	47.6
Norstat	26 Apr – 2 May	1,000	**30.6**	19.4	23.3	4.7	7.1	12.7	0.8	1.4	7.7	50.0	50.0
Norstat	19–25 Apr	1,000	**34.0**	16.7	21.0	5.6	6.2	14.2	2.0	0.3	13.0	50.7	49.3
Kantar Emor	14–20 Apr	1,495	**25**	16	18	7	9	21	4	0	4	41	59
Norstat	12–18 Apr	1,000	**30.9**	18.5	22.5	5.3	5.9	12.5	2.1	2.3	8.4	49.4	50.6
Turu-uuringute AS	18 Apr (Note: Publication date)	600–700	**30**	14	20	7	7	18	2	2	10	44	56
Norstat	6–11 Apr	1,000	**32.1**	16.0	20.8	5.7	5.9	16.6	2.1	0.8	11.3	48.1	51.9
Norstat	28 Mar – 4 Apr	1,000	**29.3**	16.6	21.4	4.2	6.3	19.3	2.3	0.6	7.9	45.9	54.1
Norstat	21–28 Mar	1,000	**31.7**	16.2	22.0	4.1	5.2	17.9	1.8	1.1	9.7	47.9	52.1
Turu-uuringute AS	19 Mar (Note: Publication date)	600–700	**23**	14	21	7	8	22	2.5	2.5	1	37	63
Norstat	14–18 Mar	≥1,000	**28.0**	17.6	20.6	5.1	9.3	16.5	1.6	1.3	7.4	45.6	54.4
Kantar Emor	10–16 Mar	1274	**26**	18	18	6	8	19	4	0	7	44	56
Norstat	8–14 Mar	≥1,000	**24.5**	18.9	24.3	6.6	7.3	18.8	1.5	0.8	0.2	43.4	56.6
Norstat	1–7 Mar	≥1,000	**31.2**	13.7	18.9	5.8	8.1	19.7	1.3	1.3	11.5	44.9	55.1
	24 Feb 2022		**Beginning of Russian invasion of Ukraine**										
Norstat	22–28 Feb	≥1,000	**26.5**	14.9	22.6	6.3	7.7	20.4	1.0	0.6	2.9	41.4	58.6
Norstat	15–21 Feb	≥1,000	**23.3**	18.2	21.8	7.9	8.2	17.8	2.4	0.4	1.5	41.5	58.5
Kantar Emor	10–18 Feb	1503	20	20	20	7	9	**21**	4	0	1	40	61
Turu-uuringute AS	18 Feb (Note: Publication date)	600–700	18	15	22	7	9	**23**	–	6	1	33	67
Norstat	8–14 Feb	≥1,000	**23.1**	18.6	19.5	7.2	8.1	20.9	2.1	0.5	1.2	41.7	58.3
Norstat	1–7 Feb	≥1,000	**23.5**	19.6	21.0	8.5	7.6	18.4	0.9	0.5	2.5	43.1	56.9
Norstat	25–31 Jan	≥1,000	18.2	23.1	**27.7**	6.5	5.9	16.0	2.1	0.5	4.6	41.3	58.7
Norstat	18–24 Jan	≥1,000	**21.9**	21.8	20.3	7.3	9.0	18.3	0.9	0.5	0.1	43.7	56.7
Kantar Emor	13–21 Jan	1220	19	20	**22**	9	7	20	4	1	2	39	61
Turu-uuringute AS	12–17 Jan	873	18	20	**24**	7	8	20	–	3	4	38	62
Norstat	11–17 Jan	≥1,000	22.0	20.6	**24.9**	6.6	6.7	17.1	1.4	0.7	2.9	42.6	57.4
Norstat	5–10 Jan	≥1,000	**24.4**	18.6	23.9	5.9	8.7	15.9	1.8	0.8	0.5	43.0	57.0
Norstat	27 Dec – 4 Jan	≥1,000	**27.4**	21.2	20.5	6.9	6.4	15.0	1.9	0.7	6.2	48.6	51.4

=== 2021 ===
Polling firm	Fieldwork Date	Sample size	Ref	Kesk	EKRE	Isamaa	SDE	E200	EER	Others	Lead	Gov.	Opp.
Norstat	14-20 Dec	≥1,000	**24.2**	22.1	19.9	7.8	5.8	16.7	1.6	1.9	2.1	46.3	53.7
Kantar Emor	9-15 Dec	1220	19	17	**22**	7	10	20	4	1	2	36	64
Norstat	7–13 Dec	≥1,000	**27.1**	18.7	22.4	7.8	8.0	14.5	1.0	0.5	4.7	45.8	54.2
Norstat	1–7 Dec	≥1,000	**22.3**	19.2	19.5	8.3	7.7	16.0	2.4	1.1	2.8	41.5	57.4
Turu-uuringute AS	30 Nov-7 Dec	1,009	21	20	**22**	7	8	18	2	1	1	41	59
Norstat	23–29 Nov	≥1,000	19.8	**22.3**	21.3	8.2	9.3	16.0	1.3	1.8	1.0	42.1	56.1
Norstat	16–22 Nov	≥1,000	20.0	20.8	**24.4**	7.8	9.0	15.0	2.0	1.0	2.3	40.8	58.2
Kantar Emor	11–17 Nov	1,045	**20**	16	**20**	10	12	19	3	1	Tie	36	63
Norstat	9–15 Nov	≥1,000	22.0	**23.6**	23.0	7.3	8.7	12.8	2.0	0.6	0.6	45.6	54.8
Turu-uuringute AS	4–9 Nov	1,000	**21**	17	19	9	10	19	2	3	2	38	59
Norstat	2–8 Nov	≥1,000	20.5	20.5	**25.5**	8.0	9.4	12.7	2.7	0.8	5.0	41.0	58.2
Norstat	26 Oct–2 Nov	≥1,000	20.8	**22.8**	21.9	7.7	8.0	16.9	1.5	0.4	0.9	43.6	56.0
Norstat	20–25 Oct	≥1,000	22.8	20.3	**24.0**	8.3	7.3	14.2	1.6	1.5	1.2	43.1	55.4
Kantar Emor	14–20 Oct	1,218	**23**	18	21	8	10	16	4	1	2	41	58
Norstat	13–18 Oct	≥1,000	23.5	18.1	**26.4**	9.0	8.9	11.1	1.6	1.4	2.9	41.6	57.0
Norstat	5–12 Oct	≥1,000	**26.7**	19.7	22.0	6.7	8.3	11.9	2.4	2.3	4.7	46.4	51.3
Turu-uuringute AS	4–8 Oct	1,000	**24**	19	23	7	7	13	3	4	1	43	53
Norstat	28 Sep–5 Oct	≥1,000	22.8	19.8	**26.3**	7.0	7.9	12.5	2.3	1.4	3.5	42.6	56.0
Norstat	22–27 Sep	≥1,000	22.9	22.3	**24.6**	7.9	9.0	11.1	1.5	0.7	1.7	45.2	54.1
Kantar Emor	16–21 Sep	1,060	**27**	16	22	6	9	16	3	1	5	43	56
Norstat	14–20 Sep	≥1,000	24.1	15.4	**26.1**	5.9	10.1	14.0	2.0	2.4	2.0	39.5	58.1
Norstat	8–13 Sep	≥1,000	**25.6**	21.3	23.6	6.2	9.8	10.4	2.2	0.9	2.0	46.9	52.2
Turu-uuringute AS	6–15 Sep	1,003	**24**	17	22	8	7	16	3	3	2	41	56
Norstat	1–7 Sep	≥1,000	**24.7**	19.2	24.6	8.4	7.2	12.4	2.4	1.1	0.1	43.9	55.0
Norstat	25–31 Aug	≥1,000	**28.2**	17.7	22.0	7.7	7.6	13.6	2.2	1.0	6.2	45.9	53.1
Norstat	17–24 Aug	≥1,000	**30.0**	18.1	23.1	5.8	9.2	11.6	1.9	0.3	6.9	48.1	51.6
Kantar Emor	12–17 Aug	1,058	**25**	16	24	4	11	15	4	1	1	41	58
Norstat	9–16 Aug	≥1,000	**32.1**	17.3	18.3	5.0	8.5	14.7	2.7	1.4	13.8	49.4	49.2
Turu-uuringute AS	5–13 Aug	1,000	**24**	17	21	5	9	16	4	4	3	41	55
Norstat	3–7 Aug	≥1,000	**29.9**	18.8	23.5	5.9	8.9	10.2	1.8	1.0	6.4	48.7	50.3
Norstat	27 Jul–2 Aug	≥1,000	**28.8**	17.8	24.8	5.8	7.6	12.1	2.3	0.8	4.0	46.6	52.6
Norstat	20–27 Jul	≥1,000	**33.9**	15.0	23.2	5.4	7.2	13.2	2.3	0.7	10.7	48.9	51.3
Kantar Emor	14–22 Jul	1,001	23	20	**25**	4	9	15	3	1	2	43	56
Norstat	13–19 Jul	≥1,000	**29.5**	16.3	26.3	6.2	6.9	12.6	1.5	0.7	3.2	45.8	53.5
Norstat	6–12 Jul	≥1,000	**28.8**	17.7	24.4	6.3	7.0	12.7	0.8	2.3	4.4	46.5	51.2
Norstat	28 Jun–4 Jul	≥1,000	**30.0**	20.4	21.0	6.1	7.0	11.4	2.5	1.6	9.0	50.4	48.0
Norstat	15–21 Jun	≥1,000	**28.7**	18.9	21.1	4.7	9.2	13.5	2.1	1.8	7.6	47.6	50.6
Kantar Emor	10–16 Jun	997	**25**	18	20	4	13	16	2	2 (Note: TULE 1%)	5.0	43	55
Norstat	8–14 Jun	≥1,000	**26.6**	18.8	25.5	5.6	8.5	10.9	1.7	2.4	1.1	45.4	52.2
Turu-uuringute AS	3–10 Jun	1,000	**24**	19	23	7	9	13	3	2	1	43	55
Norstat	1–7 Jun	≥1,000	**29.6**	20.5	21.1	5.2	7.0	14.0	1.5	1.1	8.5	50.1	48.8
Norstat	26–31 May	≥1,000	**29.3**	21.0	19.9	5.9	8.2	11.2	2.8	1.8	8.3	50.3	48.0
Norstat	19–25 May	≥1,000	**31.8**	17.9	20.6	5.5	7.1	13.7	2.4	1.0	11.2	49.7	49.3
Kantar Emor	12–18 May	1,050	**28**	16	19	7	11	16	3	2	9	44	56
Norstat	12–17 May	≥1,000	**32.5**	18.1	21.2	4.8	7.7	13.2	1.2	1.3	11.3	50.6	48.1
Turu-uuringute AS	6–11 May	1,002	**26**	20	21	5	8	15	2	3	5	46	51
Norstat	4–10 May	≥1,000	**30.4**	18.7	20.5	4.4	8.4	15.2	1.4	1.0	9.9	49.1	49.9
Norstat	27 Apr–3 May	≥1,000	**29.1**	20.7	23.9	4.8	6.0	11.9	1.9	1.7	5.2	49.8	48.5
Norstat	20–26 Apr	≥1,000	**33.4**	22.3	15.6	5.7	6.9	12.1	1.9	2.1	11.1	55.7	42.2
Kantar Emor	15–21 Apr	1,110	**27**	19	21	5	8	14	3	3 (Note: TULE 2%)	8	46	51
Norstat	13–19 Apr	≥1,000	**29.7**	19.3	17.4	5.9	6.9	16.9	2.1	1.8	10.4	49.0	49.2
Turu-uuringute AS	8–14 Apr	1,010	**27**	19	23	5	7	13	2	3	4	46	51
Norstat	7–12 Apr	≥1,000	**30.5**	17.3	21.2	5.7	8.2	13.5	1.6	2.0	9.3	47.8	50.2
Norstat	30 Mar–5 Apr	≥1,000	**34.4**	20.1	19.6	5.1	6.3	10.9	1.7	1.9	14.3	54.5	43.6
Norstat	23–29 Mar	≥1,000	**35.2**	20.7	18.2	5.4	5.7	12.4	1.9	0.5	14.5	55.9	43.6
Norstat	17–22 Mar	≥1,000	**33.3**	19.4	17.7	6.6	6.6	12.2	2.5	1.7	13.9	52.7	45.6
Turu-uuringute AS	9–15 Mar	1,005	**26**	20	19	6	9	15	3	2	6	46	52
Norstat	10–15 Mar	≥1,000	**31.5**	23	20.5	4.7	6.2	10.1	2	1.6	8.5	54.5	43.5
Kantar Emor	11–16 Mar	1,114	**28**	18	19	5	9	16	4	1	9	46	53
Norstat	2–8 Mar	≥1,000	**36.7**	17	20.3	6.2	5.3	10.5	2.9	1.1	16.4	53.7	45.2
Norstat	23 Feb–1 Mar	≥1,000	**35.4**	18.8	20.5	4.9	6.2	11.2	1.9	1.1	14.9	54.2	44.7
Norstat	16–22 Feb	≥1,000	**35.3**	19.3	18.1	5.4	6.1	12.5	2.1	1.2	16	54.6	44.2
Turu-uuringute AS	10–15 Feb	1,005	**28**	17	20	6	7	16	2	4	8	45	51
Kantar Emor	11–15 Feb	1,124	**30**	17	20	5	9	15	2	2 (Note: TULE 1%)	10	47	51
Norstat	9–15 Feb	≥1,000	**35.2**	15.5	20.2	4.8	7.6	13.7	1.9	1.1	15	50.7	48.2
Norstat	2–8 Feb	≥1,000	**34.6**	20.7	19.1	6.1	5	11.7	1.6	1.2	13.9	55.3	41.9
Norstat	26 Jan–1 Feb	≥1,000	**32.3**	18.6	17.1	5.1	7.7	15.4	2.5	1.3	13.7	50.9	47.8
	26 Jan		**Kaja Kallas' first cabinet is formed by Reform and Kesk**										
Norstat	18–25 Jan	≥1,000	**31.6**	20.7	19.2	5.2	5.1	15.0	2.4	0.8	10.9	45.1	54.1
Turu-uuringute AS	12–21 Jan	1008	**27**	20	17	6	8	14	3	5	7	43	57
Norstat	12–18 Jan	≥1,000	**28.7**	21.8	16.3	7.0	7.5	14.2	2.7	1.8	6.9	45.1	53.1
Kantar Emor	14–19 Jan	1,219	**27**	19	14	8	9	17	4	1	8	41	58
	14 Jan		**Jüri Ratas' second cabinet is dissolved**										
Norstat	5–11 Jan	≥1,000	**29.5**	20.9	15.1	5.2	8.7	15.2	1.9	3.5	8.6	41.2	55.3
Norstat	29 Dec–4 Jan	≥1,000	**29.6**	22.1	14.7	5.5	8.8	15.2	2.0	2.1	7.5	42.3	55.6

=== 2020 ===
Polling firm	Fieldwork Date	Sample size	Ref	Kesk	EKRE	I	SDE	E200	Green	TULE	Others	Lead	Gov.	Opp.
Norstat	16–21 Dec	≥1,000	**28.1**	20.9	15.9	7.4	6.4	17.3	2.1	—	1.9	7.2	44.2	53.9
Norstat	9–14 Dec	≥1,000	**26.4**	21.5	14.2	5.9	8.6	18.1	3.1	—	2.2	4.9	41.6	56.2
Kantar Emor	3–9 Dec	1,151	**27**	16	17	7	9	18	5	1	—	9	40	60
Norstat	1–7 Dec	≥1,000	**31.2**	21.4	13.2	5.5	8.1	15.4	1.7	—	3.5	9.8	40.1	59.9
Turu-uuringute AS	27 Nov–7 Dec	881	21	**25**	14	5	9	20	3	1	2	4	44	54
Norstat	24–30 Nov	≥1,000	**28.8**	22.8	14.7	4.9	6.6	15.3	3.6	1.1	2.2	6.0	42.4	55.4
Norstat	17–23 Nov	≥1,000	**29.6**	21.0	13.1	6.5	9.4	14.8	3.0	0.4	2.2	8.6	40.6	57.2
Kantar Emor	13–18 Nov	1,281	**28**	17	16	6	10	18	3	2	—	10	39	61
Norstat	11–16 Nov	≥1,000	**33.7**	19.6	14.6	6.0	8.3	13.4	2.3	0.6	1.5	14.1	40.2	58.3
Norstat	3–9 Nov	≥1,000	**29.7**	24.5	16.5	4.5	9.1	11.4	2.9	0.4	1.0	5.2	45.5	53.5
Turu-uuringute AS	30 Oct–9 Nov	854	23	**24**	15	6	10	13	4	1	4	1	45	51
Norstat	27 Oct–2 Nov	≥1,000	**31.5**	21.0	18.2	4.9	7.2	10.1	2.5	0.3	4.3	10.5	44.1	51.6
Norstat	22–26 Oct	≥1,000	**35.1**	20.3	14.2	6.9	8.6	8.9	3.1	0.6	2.3	14.8	41.4	56.3
Norstat	14–20 Oct	≥1,000	**29.4**	25.0	17.2	6.1	9.1	9.3	2.1	0.6	1.2	4.4	48.3	50.5
Turu-uuringute AS	1–15 Oct	873	26	**27**	18	5	9	7	3	1	4	1	**50**	45
Kantar Emor	8–14 Oct	1,268	**33**	17	15	5	11	13	3	2	1	16	37	62
Norstat	6–13 Oct	≥1,000	**32.2**	22.3	18.1	4.4	9.0	7.7	3.5	0.6	2.2	9.9	44.8	53.0
Norstat	28 Sep–5 Oct	≥1,000	**35.1**	21.2	15.7	5.7	9.6	8.1	2.2	1.4	1.0	13.9	42.6	56.4
Norstat	23–28 Sep	≥1,000	**31.4**	22.8	17.0	4.2	12.1	5.8	3.0	0.5	3.3	8.6	44	52.7
Kantar Emor	17–23 Sep	1,089	**32**	18	13	6	12	13	3	2	1	14	37	62
Norstat	15–21 Sep	≥1,000	**34.7**	21.6	14.3	4.8	8.2	8.1	3.2	1.4	3.7	13.1	40.7	55.6
Turu-uuringute AS	07–17 Sep	1,010	**27**	24	16	5	11	9	3	3	—	3	45	55
Norstat	9–15 Sep	≥1,000	**32.5**	22.5	13.8	5.8	9.1	9.7	2.5	1.4	2.7	10.0	42.1	55.2
Norstat	2–9 Sep	≥1,000	**33.3**	26.2	15.5	4.6	8.3	8.4	2.0	0.8	0.9	7.1	46.3	52.8
Norstat	25–31 Aug	≥1,000	**33.0**	24.5	16.2	4.0	8.8	7.6	3.3	1.2	1.4	8.5	44.7	53.9
	20 Aug		**The Biodiversity Party and the Estonian Free Party merge to form the Estonian Party of the Future**											

Polling firm	Fieldwork Date	Sample size	Ref	Kesk	EKRE	I	SDE	E200	Green	EVA	Others	Lead	Gov.	Opp.
Norstat	17–25 Aug	≥1,000	**35.5**	20.9	16.1	5.8	6.7	9.9	1.3	0.7	3.1	14.6	42.8	54.1
Turu-uuringute AS	12–24 Aug	1,003	23	**26**	20	5	10	9	2	0	1	3	51	48
Kantar Emor	13–19 Aug	1,268	**30**	17	17	5	13	14	2	1	3	13	39	58
Norstat	10–17 Aug	≥1,000	**33.0**	22.9	15.4	6.1	9.8	7.9	2.3	0.6	2.0	7.1	44.4	53.6
Norstat	4–10 Aug	≥1,000	**32.1**	19.4	19.0	6.2	8.4	9.4	1.2	1.1	3.2	12.7	44.6	52.2
Norstat	27 Jul–3 Aug	≥1,000	**33.0**	22.5	18.4	5.9	8.8	6.8	2.6	0.9	1.1	10.5	46.8	52.1
Norstat	21–28 Jul	≥1,000	**31.2**	24.1	18.6	6.4	8.7	6.8	2.2	0.6	1.4	7.1	49.1	49.5
Kantar Emor	16–22 Jul	1,125	**31**	17	18	6	9	14	3	0	2	13	41	57
Norstat	14–20 Jul	≥1,000	**34.0**	23.5	16.8	5.6	8.7	6.9	2.3	0.3	1.9	10.5	45.9	52.2
Norstat	7–13 Jul	≥1,000	**32.3**	23.2	15.8	4.4	10.2	7.5	2.2	0.4	4.0	9.1	43.4	52.6
Norstat	29 Jun–6 Jul	≥1,000	**32.1**	22.9	14.8	6.1	9.2	9.6	2.5	0.6	2.2	9.2	43.8	54
Norstat	16–22 Jun	≥1,000	**30.3**	26.1	16.0	5.9	9.3	9.2	1.3	0.9	1.2	4.2	48	51
Norstat	9–16 Jun	≥1,000	**31.7**	27.0	16.3	5.9	7.6	7.4	2.4	0.4	1.3	4.7	49.2	49.5
Turu-uuringute AS	9–15 Jun	1,004	**33**	27	16	3	8	9	2	0	1	6	46	55
Kantar Emor	Jun	1,268	**28**	19	19	5	10	13	3	0	3	9	43	54
Norstat	1–8 Jun	≥1,000	**30.3**	22.8	20.3	4.7	7.6	7.2	3.4	0.4	3.3	7.5	47.8	48.9
Norstat	25 May–1 Jun	≥1,000	**30.8**	24.5	16.7	5.6	9.3	7.7	1.4	0.3	3.7	6.3	46.8	49.5
Norstat	18–25 May	≥1,000	**32.4**	27.1	12.4	6.3	7.4	7.3	3.8	0.4	2.9	5.3	45.8	51.3
Kantar Emor	14–20 May	1,268	**24**	20	22	4	12	14	2	0	2	2	46	52
Norstat	12–18 May	≥1,000	**30.8**	26.0	16.7	4.6	7.3	8.5	2.0	1.1	3.0	4.8	47.3	49.7
Turu-uuringute AS	7–15 May	1,004	**30**	27	15	6	7	8	2	0	1	3	48	51
Norstat	06–12 May	≥1,000	**29.1**	25.0	18.0	5.9	8.3	8.2	2.3	0.2	3.8	4.1	48.9	48.3
Norstat	24 Apr–5 May	≥1,000	**29.8**	23.8	19.2	4.6	9.3	8.6	2.7	0.8	1.2	6.0	47.6	51.2
Norstat	21–27 Apr	≥1,000	**29.3**	27.8	18.1	5.3	8.1	6.2	2.1	0.7	3.0	1.5	51.2	45.8
Kantar Emor	20–22 Apr	1,280	**30**	18	19	4	10	14	3	2	3	12	42	55
Norstat	15–20 Apr	≥1,000	**34.6**	22.3	18.1	5.2	8.2	6.5	2.3	0.2	2.4	12.3	45.6	52.0
Norstat	7–14 Apr	≥1,000	**32.9**	23.5	16.3	6.3	8.0	8.4	1.8	0.4	2.4	9.4	46.1	51.5
Turu-uuringute AS	6–7 Apr	1,000	**27**	24	17	7	8	11	2	1	3	3	48	49
Norstat	31 Mar–6 Apr	≥1,000	**33.5**	25.7	14.1	5.1	7.6	8.0	2.1	0.7	3.2	7.8	44.9	51.9
Norstat	24–30 Mar	≥1,000	29.7	**30.4**	15.9	4.1	6.8	7.7	2.2	0.5	2.7	0.7	50.4	46.9
Norstat	18–23 Mar	≥1,000	**29.6**	26.1	16.9	5.4	8.6	7.2	3.2	0.3	2.7	3.5	48.4	48.9
Kantar Emor	12–18 Mar	1,118	**29**	17	21	4	12	13	3	−	2	8	42	56
Norstat	10–16 Mar	≥1,000	**30.7**	26.2	16.5	6.3	7.2	9.4	1.8	0.2	1.7	4.5	49.0	49.7
Turu-uuringute AS	6–16 Mar	1,056	**26**	22	20	6	9	12	3	1	1	4	48	51
Norstat	04–9 Mar	≥1,000	**29.5**	21.6	16.9	6.1	10.5	8.9	2.8	0.5	3.2	7.9	44.6	52.2
Norstat	26 Feb–2 Mar	≥1,000	**33.2**	24.2	16.3	5.8	7.0	6.6	2.5	0.7	3.3	9.0	46.3	50.4
Norstat	19–26 Feb	≥1,000	**33.2**	19.3	18.4	6.9	10.2	7.5	2.1	0.5	1.9	13.9	44.6	53.5
Kantar Emor	1–22 Feb	—	**31**	18	17	4	12	14	3	−	1	13	39	60
Norstat	13–18 Feb	≥1,000	**30.9**	22.4	18.0	6.0	7.9	9.8	3.0	0.7	1.3	8.5	46.4	52.3
Turu-uuringute AS	6–17 Feb	808	**25**	24	16	5	10	9	2	−	1	1	45	54
Norstat	04–11 Feb	≥1,000	**33.8**	20.0	17.5	7.3	6.7	9.2	3.3	0.5	1.8	13.8	44.8	53.4
Norstat	28 Jan–3 Feb	≥1,000	**35.1**	20.8	15.6	5.9	10.2	8.5	2.7	0.3	1.0	14.3	42.3	56.7
Norstat	23–27 Jan	≥1,000	**35.9**	19.3	12.7	6.0	10.7	8.5	4.1	0.4	2.4	16.6	38.0	59.6
Kantar Emor	1–31 Jan	—	**30**	17	16	8	14	9	3	1	2	13	41	57
Turu-uuringute AS	17–27 Jan	808	**25**	24	18	7	10	8	3	1	1	1	49	50
Norstat	16–24 Jan	≥1,000	**35.0**	22.8	14.6	5.6	9.3	7.2	2.9	1.1	1.4	12.2	43.0	55.6
Norstat	8–14 Jan	≥1,000	**32.2**	24.3	12.9	8.4	8.5	7.0	3.5	0.6	2.2	7.9	45.6	52.2
Norstat	3–7 Jan	≥1,000	**34.1**	23.6	15.8	6.3	8.2	7.3	2.6	0.6	1.5	10.5	45.7	52.8

=== 2019 ===
Polling firm	Fieldwork Date	Sample size	Ref	Kesk	EKRE	I	SDE	E200	Green	EVA	Others	Lead	Gov.	Opp.
Norstat	18–23 Dec	≥1,000	30.3	22.0	16.1	5.9	11.9	7.2	3.4	0.9	2.4	8.3	44.0	53.6
Norstat	11–17 Dec	≥1,000	34.3	22.5	13.5	5.4	11.8	6.8	3.2	0.1	2.4	11.8	41.4	56.2
Kantar Emor	5–12 Dec	1,407	34.8	17.9	15.6	6.3	13.7	7.7	2	—	2	9.2	39.8	58.2
Norstat	2–9 Dec	≥1,000	35.4	21.1	16.3	6.0	9.0	6.6	3.2	0.4	1.9	14.3	43.4	54.7
Turu-uuringute AS	28 Nov–9 Dec	1,014	29	25	17	5	10	5	3	1	5	4	47	48
Norstat	25–29 Nov	≥1,000	36.4	23.5	11.9	8.1	10.4	2.9	3.8	0.5	2.3	12.9	43.5	53.6
Norstat	18–25 Nov	≥1,000	36.1	24.0	12.2	6.8	9.8	5.0	3.5	0.5	2.1	12.1	43.0	54.9
Norstat	11–15 Nov	≥1,000	35.4	26.1	12.6	7.2	9.5	3.8	1.7	0.1	3.8	9.3	45.9	50.3
Kantar Emor	7–13 Nov	1,407	27.7	16.2	18.5	6.2	16.2	9.5	4	1	1.7	9.2	40.9	57.4
Turu-uuringute AS	31 Oct–12 Nov	1,019	30	23	17	5	11	7	2	1	1	7	45.0	54
Norstat	5–11 Nov	≥1,000	32.6	24.3	17.5	6.5	10.9	3.4	3.5	0.2	1.0	8.3	48.3	50.7
Norstat	28 Oct–5 Nov	≥1,000	36.2	22.9	15.8	5.8	8.2	5.0	3.2	0.8	1.8	13.3	44.5	53.7
Norstat	22–28 Oct	≥1,000	36.1	23.4	17.7	5.5	6.3	5.1	2.9	0.6	2.0	12.7	46.6	51.4
Norstat	15–21 Oct	≥1,000	36.3	23.4	15.6	6.6	7.4	4.5	2.7	0.3	2.9	14.9	45.6	51.5
Kantar Emor	10–16 Oct	1,182	32.5	17.6	16.6	6.2	12.4	9.4	2.9	—	1.7	14.9	40.4	57.9
Norstat	9–14 Oct	≥1,000	30.7	25.8	17.6	7.1	8.3	5.6	2.3	0.4	1.4	4.9	50.5	48.1
Turu-uuringute AS	3–13 Oct	1,040	32	22	17	6	9	7	3	1	—	10	45.0	54.0
Norstat	1–8 Oct	≥1,000	35.6	22.2	15.2	6.5	9.2	6.1	2.4	0.6	2.1	13.4	43.9	54.0
Norstat	25–30 Sep	≥1,000	32.7	24.3	15.6	7.4	8.3	6.2	2.8	0.6	2.1	8.4	47.3	50.6
Norstat	18–23 Sep	≥1,000	37.1	20.7	18.3	5.4	8.6	4.2	3.4	0.6	1.8	17.0	44.4	53.8
Kantar Emor	11–19 Sep	1,161	32.8	16.5	18.4	7.0	11.0	7.5	5	—	1	14.4	41.9	57.5
Norstat	10–17 Sep	≥1,000	33.5	24.0	17.0	7.2	6.4	5.2	3.7	0.1	2.3	13.5	48.2	49.5
Turu-uuringute AS	5–16 Sep	1,040	32	21	19	6	9	5	2	1	1	11	45.0	53.0
Norstat	3–9 Sep	≥1,000	33.9	23.7	15.1	7.8	9.1	5.0	2.6	0.6	2.1	10.2	46.6	50.8
Norstat	27 Aug–2 Sep	≥1,000	35.9	24.6	14.8	6.5	9.3	4.8	1.3	0.2	2.6	11.3	45.9	51.5
Norstat	21–26 Aug	≥1,000	34.3	23.7	15.2	6.2	9.0	4.5	2.6	0.8	3.6	10.6	45.1	51.3
Kantar Emor	15–21 Aug	1,161	36.8	16.0	17.6	4.8	13.0	6.9	—	—	—	19.2	43.3	56.7
Turu-uuringute AS	9–20 Aug	1,000	34	22	16	7	8	5	3	1	1	12	45.0	54.0
Norstat	13–19 Aug	≥1,000	33.9	23.0	16.9	7.1	10.9	4.1	1.8	0.7	1.7	10.9	47.0	51.7
Norstat	5–12 Aug	≥1,000	33.5	22.0	16.4	9.1	10.0	3.5	3.9	0.3	1.1	11.5	47.5	51.2
Norstat	30 Jul–5 Aug	≥1,000	41.0	18.9	12.7	8.8	8.1	4.2	2.8	0.8	3.0	22.1	40.1	56.9
Norstat	22–30 Jul	≥1,000	36.2	17.8	17.7	7.1	12.0	4.0	1.9	0.6	2.6	18.4	42.6	54.8
Kantar Emor	18–24 Jul	1,305	34.5	15.3	19.4	6.8	10.8	7.9	—	—	—	15.1	41.5	53.2
Norstat	15–22 Jul	≥1,000	39.1	18.3	16.6	7.7	7.6	4.4	2.7	0.2	3.6	20.8	42.6	54.0
Norstat	8–15 Jul	≥1,000	37.7	16.4	15.8	11.0	8.7	4.0	2.7	1.1	2.7	21.3	43.2	54.2
Norstat	2–8 Jul	≥1,000	31.9	22.3	18.0	8.2	11.0	4.3	2.5	0.9	1.0	9.6	48.5	50.6
Norstat	26 Jun–1 Jul	≥1,000	34.3	20.8	17.5	9.2	9.8	5.3	2.1	0.2	0.7	13.5	47.5	51.7
Norstat	11–19 Jun	≥1,000	37.7	20.2	15.2	5.6	13.6	4.0	1.7	0.3	1.6	17.5	41.0	57.3
Kantar Emor	6–13 Jun	1,129	36.0	14.7	16.7	6.9	12.8	8.3	3.0	0	1.0	19.3	38.3	60.1
Norstat	4–11 Jun	≥1,000	30.3	21.4	19.1	8.7	9.4	5.8	2.6	1.4	1.0	8.9	49.2	49.5
Turu-uuringute AS	28 May–10 Jun	1,000	32	19	18	9	11	4	1	1	1	13	46	49
Norstat	27 May–3 Jun	≥1,000	30	23	19	8	12	3	3	0	1	7	50	48
Norstat	20–27 May	≥1,000	33.0	19.5	16.8	10.4	11.7	4.6	2.4	0.4	1.1	13.5	46.7	52.1
	26 May		2019 European Parliament election in Estonia											
Kantar Emor	20–23 May	1,390	30.6	14.7	15.0	7.9	12.1	11.8	—	—	—	15.6	37.6	54.4
Norstat	14–20 May	≥1,000	28.6	21.5	22.0	8.8	9.4	5.3	2.2	0.7	1.5	6.6	52.3	46.2
Turu-uuringute AS	2–15 May	2,037	27	20	17	10	10	8	3	1	1	7	47	49
Norstat	6–13 May	≥1,000	31.8	19.4	16.2	8.0	12.2	5.1	4.5	0.3	2.0	12.4	43.6	53.9
Kantar Emor	7–9 May	1,271	33.5	15.3	16.9	6.1	12.9	11.5	-		3.8	16.6	38.3	57.9
Norstat	29 Apr–7 May	≥1,000	35.6	19.9	15.0	8.3	10.8	6.0	2.5	0.5	1.6	15.7	43.2	55.4
Norstat	22–29 Apr	≥1,000	33.6	18.5	19.1	7.6	8.5	7.2	3.4	0.3	1.9	14.5	45.2	53.0
	24 Apr		Jüri Ratas' second cabinet is formed by Kesk, EKRE and Isamaa.											
Norstat	15–22 Apr	≥1,000	32	20.1	20.1	9.2	8.4	5.4	2.6	0.7	0.7	11.9	49.4	49.1
Kantar Emor	10–15 Apr	1,000	32.3	17	15.4	8.5	11.4	10.3	2.7	1.1	-	15.3	40.9	57.8
Norstat	8–15 Apr	1,000	34.6	19.4	18	7.3	10.1	5.9	2.5	0.3	1.6	16	44.7	53.4
Norstat	18 Mar–15 Apr	4,014	33.0	20.6	17.9	9.4	9.2	5.8	2.3	–	1.8	12.4	47.9	50.3
Norstat	1–8 Apr	1,000	33.4	22.5	14.8	11.6	8.0	4.8	3.0	0.5	1.3	10.9	48.9	49.7
Norstat	25–29 Mar	1,000	32.5	20.5	19.1	9.0	10.1	5.5	1.7	0.6	1.0	12.0	48.6	50.4
Norstat	18–24 Mar	1,000	31.9	19.5	18.8	8.9	9.3	7.2	2.1	0.9	1.5	12.4	47.2	51.4
Kantar Emor	14–21 Mar	1,214	32	17	18	7	11	10	3	0.3	1.7	14.0	42.0	56.3
Turu-uuringute AS	5–18 Mar	1,004	27	24	21	11	9	5	1	1	1	3.0	**56.0**	43.0
Norstat	11–15 Mar	1,000	36.9	19.4	12.6	11.2	9.0	6.5	1.7	0.6	2.1	17.5	43.2	54.7
Kantar Emor	12–13 Mar	752	30	19.4	18.1	7.3	12.5	8.5	1.7	0.6	2.2	10.6	44.8	53.3
Norstat	5–11 Mar	1,000	31.9	21.2	18.1	11.4	9.1	4.4	1.7	1.1	1.2	10.7	**50.7**	48.2
**Election Results**	**3 Mar**	**N/A**	28.9	**23.1**	**17.8**	**11.4**	**9.8**	**4.4**	**1.8**	**1.2**	**1.6**	**5.7**	**52.3**	**46.1**
**Election Results**	**3 Mar**	**N/A**	34	**26**	**19**	**12**	**10**	**0**	**0**	**0**		**8.0**	**57**	**44**

== Demographics ==
=== Estonians ===
Fieldwork date	Polling firm	Sample size	Ref	EKRE	Kesk	E200	SDE	Isamaa	Others	Lead	Gov.	Opp.
20-22 Feb 2023	Emor		33	22		16		—	—	11		
13-16 Feb 2023	Emor		36	19	9	15	8	9	5	17		
6-9 Feb 2023	Emor		37	21	8	12	7	10	5	16		
30 Jan - 2 Feb 2023	Emor		35	22	8	13	9	8		13		
19-26 Jan 2023	Emor		38	21	6	13	8	7	6	8		
5-11 Jan 2023	Emor		33	24	9	11	9	8		9		
10-17 Nov 2022	Emor		37	22	8	13	8	7		15		
13-19 Oct 2022	Emor		33	26	8	14	8			7		
11-22 Aug 2022	Emor		38	19	8	13	11	9		19		
12–20 May 2022	Emor		39	19	8	16	6	9		20		
14–20 Apr 2022	Emor		29	20	8	21	9	9		8		

=== Other nationalities ===
Fieldwork date	Polling firm	Sample size	Ref	EKRE	Kesk	E200	SDE	Isamaa	Others	Lead	Gov.	Opp.
20-22 Feb 2023	Emor			12	42		12		—	30		
13-16 Feb 2023	Emor		14	12	45	9	10		—	31		
6-9 Feb 2023	Emor		12	11	45	14	11		—	31		
30 Jan - 2 Feb 2023	Emor		11	10	48	12	6		—	36		
19-26 Jan 2023	Emor		9	12	53	11	6		—	41		
5-11 Jan 2023	Emor		11	11	51	11	8		—	40		
10-17 Nov 2022	Emor		8	24	40	16		2	—	16		
13-19 Oct 2022	Emor		11	21	39	13	8	2	—	18		
11-22 Aug 2022	Emor		8	14	46	12	12	2	—	32		
12–20 May 2022	Emor		10	8	46	19	10	1	—	27		
14–20 Apr 2022	Emor		9	12	43	22			—	21		
