= List of political parties in Estonia =

This article lists political parties in Estonia. Estonia has a multi-party system with numerous parties, in which no one party is likely to gain power alone, and parties must work with each other to form coalition governments.

== Major parties ==
Parties represented in the Riigikogu or the European Parliament.

Party		Leader	Ideology	Political position	MPs (Note: Members of the Riigikogu are formally not allowed to change their group membership to a parliamentary group of another party in the middle of the term. Therefore, party-switching MPs often end up labelled as "Non-affiliated members" despite being so in name only. For that reason, this list of MPs is based on formal party membership, verifiable in the Business Register.)	MEPs	EU party
Estonian Reform Party; Eesti Reformierakond	RE	Kristen Michal	Conservative liberalism; Pro-Europeanism	Centre-right	38 / 101	1 / 7	Renew
Social Democratic Party; Sotsiaaldemokraatlik Erakond	SDE	Lauri Läänemets	Social democracy; Pro-Europeanism	Centre-left	14 / 101	2 / 7	PES
Estonia 200; Erakond Eesti 200	E200	Kristina Kallas	Liberalism; Pro-Europeanism	Centre	12 / 101	0 / 7	—N/a
Fatherland; Isamaa	I	Urmas Reinsalu	National conservatism; Christian democracy	Centre-right to right-wing	11 / 101	2 / 7	EPP
EKRE - Conservative People's Party of Estonia; EKRE - Eesti Konservatiivne Rahvaerakond	EKRE	Martin Helme	National conservatism; Right-wing populism	Right-wing to far-right	9 / 101	0 / 7	P.eu
Estonian Centre Party; Eesti Keskerakond	KE	Mihhail Kõlvart	Conservatism; Populism	Centre-left	8 / 101	2 / 7	ECR Renew
Right-Wingers; Parempoolsed	PP	Lavly Perling	Economic liberalism; Pro-Europeanism	Centre-right to right-wing	1 / 101	0 / 7	—N/a
Estonian Nationalists and Conservatives; Eesti Rahvuslased ja Konservatiivid	ERK	Rein Suurkask	Estonian nationalism; Ethnofuturism	Right-wing to far-right	1 / 101	0 / 7	—N/a

== Minor parties ==
Parties not represented in the Riigikogu.

Name		Leader	Ideology
Estonian Greens; Erakond Eestimaa Rohelised	EER	Kaia Solnik; Rasmus Lahtvee	Green politics; Social liberalism
Estonian National Liberals - Free Party; Eesti Rahvusliberaalid - Vabaerakond	ERLV	Märt Meesak	National liberalism
Left Alliance; Eesti Vasakliit	VL	Collective Leadership	Democratic socialism; Progressivism
TOGETHER Party; KOOS Erakond	KOOS	Aivo Peterson	Social conservatism; Russophilia

=== Former parties ===
- Agrarian-Center Party (Estonia) (Eestimaa Talupidajate Keskliit)
- Coalition Party and Country Union (Koonderakond ja Maarahva Ühendus)
- Coalition Party and Country Union (Estonian Coalition Party/Estonian Country People's Union) (?)
- Communist Party of Estonia (Eestimaa Kommunistlik Partei)
- Communist Party (on CPSU platform) (Eestimaa Kommunistlik Partei (NLKP platvormil))
- Conservative People's Party of Estonia (1990) (Eesti Konservatiivne Rahvaerakond)
- Constitution Party (Konstitutsioonierakond)
- Democratic Party (Estonia) (Eesti Demokraatlik Erakond)
- Estonian Biodiversity Party (Elurikkuse Erakond)
- Estonian Blue Party (Eesti Sinine Erakond)
- Estonian Christian Democratic Party (Eesti Kristlik-Demokraatlik Erakond)
- Estonian Christian Democratic Union (Eesti Kristlik-Demokraatlik Liit)
- Estonian Christian Democrats (Erakond Eesti Kristlikud Demokraadid)
- Estonian Country Union (Eesti Maaliit)
- Estonian Democratic Justice Union (Eesti Demokraatlik Õigusliit)
- Estonian Democratic Labour Party (Eesti Demokraatlik Tööerakond)
- Estonian Entrepreneurs' Party (Eesti Ettevõtjate Erakond)
- Estonian Free Party (Eesti Vabaerakond)
- Estonian Freedom Party – Farmers' Assembly (Vabaduspartei – Põllumeeste Kogu)
- Estonian Greens (Eesti Rohelised)
- Estonian Independence Party (Eesti Iseseisvuspartei)
- Estonian Labour Party (Eesti Tööerakond)
- Estonian Left Party (Eesti Vasakpartei)
- Estonian National Independence Party (Eesti Rahvusliku Sõltumatuse Partei)
- Estonian National Progressive Party (Eesti Rahvuslik Eduerakond)
- Estonian Party of Pensioners and Families (Eesti Pensionäride ja Perede Erakond)
- Estonian People's Party (Eesti Rahvaerakond)
- Estonian Progressive People's Party (Eesti Rahvameelne Eduerakond)
- Estonian Radical Socialist Party (Eesti Radikaal-Sotsialistlik Partei)
- Estonian Rural League (Eesti Maarahva Liit)
- Estonian Rural People's Union (Eesti Maarahva Liit)
- Estonian Social Democratic Party (Eesti Sotsiaaldemokraatlik Partei)
- Estonian Social Democratic Independence Party (Eesti Sotsiaaldemokraatlik Iseseisvuspartei)
- Estonian Social Democratic Workers' Party (Eesti Sotsiaaldemokraatlik Tööliste Partei)
- Farmers' Union (Põllumeeste Kogu)
- Free Democratic Party (Estonia) (Eesti Vabad Demokraadid)
- Free Estonia (Demokraatlik Ühendus "Vaba Eesti")
- Independent Royalist Party of Estonia (Sõltumatud Kuningriiklased)
- Joint Soviet of Work Collectives (?)
- Liberal People's Party (Estonia) (Eesti Liberaalne Rahvapartei)
- Libertas Estonia (Libertas Eesti Erakond)
- Moderate (Social Democratic Party/Country Centre Party) (?)
- National Coalition Party Pro Patria (Rahvuslik Koonderakond "Isamaa")
- New Estonia (Uus Eesti), merged to People's Union of Estonia
- Northern Estonian Citizens' Party (Põhja-Eesti Kodanike Partei)
- Party of People's Unity (Rahva Ühtsuse Erakond)
- Peasants' Party (Estonia) (Eesti Talurahva Erakond)
- People's Party (Estonia) (Rahvaerakond)
- People's Party of Republicans and Conservatives (Vabariiklaste ja Konservatiivide Rahvaerakond)
- Popular Front of Estonia (Rahvarinne)
- Pro Patria Union (Isamaaliit)
- Progress Party (Estonia) (?)
- Radical Democratic Party (Estonia) (?)
- Republican Coalition Party (Estonian Republican Coalition Party) (Vabariiklaste Koonderakond)
- Res Publica Party (Erakond Res Publica)
- Safe Home (coalition)
- The Right Wingers (People's Party of Republicans Conservatives) (?)
- RKEI and ERSP (Pro Patria National Coalition and Estonian National Independence Party) (?)
- Russian Party in Estonia (Vene Erakond Eestis)
- Russian Social Democratic Party (Vene Sotsiaaldemokraatlik Partei Eestis)
- Swedish People's League (Rootsi Rahvaliit)
- Vaps Movement (Eesti Vabadussõjalaste Keskliit)
- Russian Party in Estonia (Vene Erakond Eestis)

== See also ==
- List of political parties by country
