= Free Party (disambiguation) =

A free party is a party "free" from the restrictions of the legal club scene, similar to the free festival movement.

Free Party may also refer to:

- Free Party Canada
- Estonian Free Party, a defunct political party in Estonia
  - Estonian Free Party (2024), its self-claimed successor
- Free Party (UK), a defunct political party in the United Kingdom
- Free Party of Luxembourg, a defunct political party in Luxembourg
- Free Party Salzburg, a defunct political party in Austria

== See also ==
- Freedom Party (disambiguation)
