= Artur Talvik =

Estonian politician

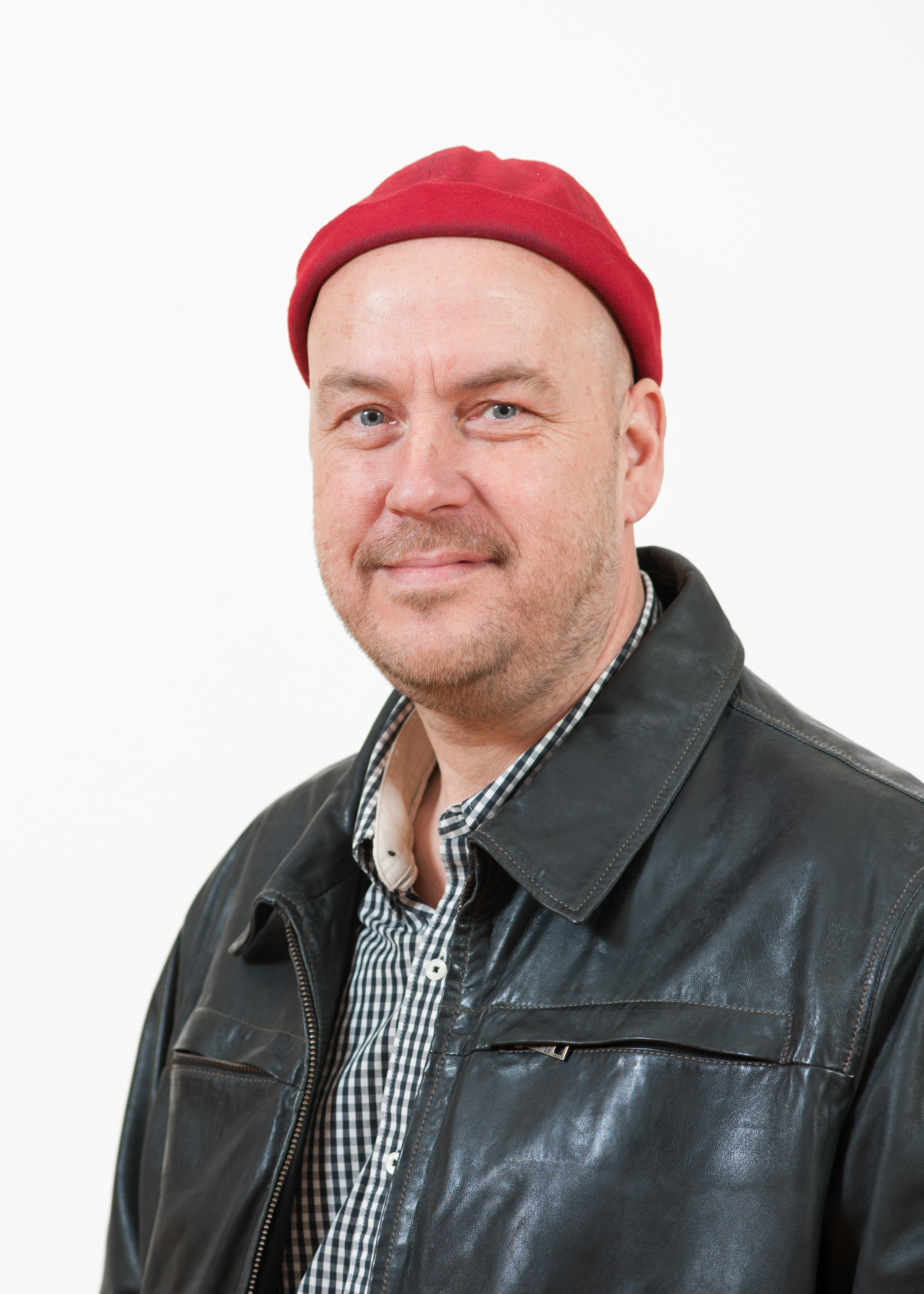

Leader of the Richness of Life Party
- Incumbent
- Assumed office 2 September 2018
- Preceded by: Party established

Leader of the Free Party
- In office 24 April 2017 – 12 May 2018
- Preceded by: Andres Herkel
- Succeeded by: Andres Herkel

Personal details
- Born: 13 June 1964 (age 62)
- Party: Free Party (2017–2018); Richness of Life (2018–present)
- Spouse(s): Epp Eespäev (divorced); Anneli Kalle-Talvik
- Children: 4
- Education: Estonian Academy of Music and Theatre

Artur Talvik (born 13 June 1964) is an Estonian politician, film director, film producer, actor, and screenwriter. He was a member of the Riigikogu and a former member of the Estonian Free Party. He now leads the Richness of Life party.

== Biography ==
Talvik is the son of Alice Talvik and Mati Talvik, a television director and television journalist, respectively. He graduated from the Estonian Academy of Music and Theatre in 1988 and starting in 1992, was an actor at Nukuteater. He later became a prolific filmmaker, directing and producing movies all throughout the 1990s and 2000s, most notably Vene metalli ja US $ suudlus, Ööliblika jõulud, Waterbomb for the Fat Tomcat (Estonian: Veepomm paksule kõutsile), December Heat, and Baruto – tõlkes kaduma läinud. In 2010, he participated in the TV3 series Laulud tähtedega with Lenna Kuurmaa. In 2023, he appeared as the character Rainar in the Trrin Ruumet directed rama film Tume paradiis. He was married to actress Epp Eespäev, with whom he has two children, a son and daughter. The couple later divorced. He is married to Anneli Kalle-Talvik, a physician with whom he has a daughter. He is also a stepfather.

=== Political career ===
During the 2011 Riigikogu elections, Talvik ran as an independent representing Harju and Rapla counties. In the 2015 Riigikogu elections, he ran as an independent under the Estonian Free Party list, being billed as a vote magnet due to his popularity, as well as running on a campaign message of anti-corruption, and received 7,307 votes in the same district, being elected to the Riigikogu. He was fined due to protesting a law that prohibited outside political ads after the cutoff date before an election by having campaign ads on his car after the date had passed, claiming it creates disadvantages for a small party to gain traction.

As a member of the Riigikogu, in 2015, Talvik helped to create a committee to investigate alleged corruption in the financial dealings of the Port of Tallinn, as well as protecting state companies from corruption. He was elected to be the committee chairman of the Anti-Corruption Select Committee on 16 December 2016, with Anneli Ott of the Centre Party as deputy chairwoman. He is currently a member of the Rural Affairs Committee.

Talvik would later fully join on 8 March 2017 and become the leader of the Free Party, elected into the position on 24 April. His election came after the Free Party controversially kicked out fellow candidate for leadership Jevgeni Krištafovitš on 24 March 2017 for "spreading falsities and slandering the party". Afterwards, he resigned as chairman of the Anti-Corruption Select Committee, with former leader of the party Andres Herkel being elected in his place on 13 June.

In May 2018, Talvik chose not to re-run for the Free Party leadership and Herkel was reelected as the Free Party's chairman on 12 May. A day later, Talvik left the Estonian Free Party, but promised to stay in politics.

== Filmography ==
=== As producer ===
- "Kõrbekuu" (1999, short feature film)
- "Tulekummardajad" (2000, documentary film)
- "Waterbomb for the Fat Tomcat" (2004, along with Gatis Upmalis, children's film)
- "The Singing Revolution" (2006, documentary film)
- "Kinnunen" (2007, along with Aet Laigu)
- "December Heat" (2008)
- "Tondipoisid" (:et) (2009, documentary film)
- "Okupeeri oma müür" (2013, documentary film, with Peeter Vihma)

(source:)

=== As director ===
- "Vene metalli ja US $ suudlus" (1993, with Rein Kotov)
- "Ööliblika jõulud" (1994, with Rein Kotov)
- "Vabadus või surm" (1995)
- "Baruto – tõlkes kaduma läinud" (2009, documentary film)

(source:)
