= Külliki Kübarsepp =

Estonian politician

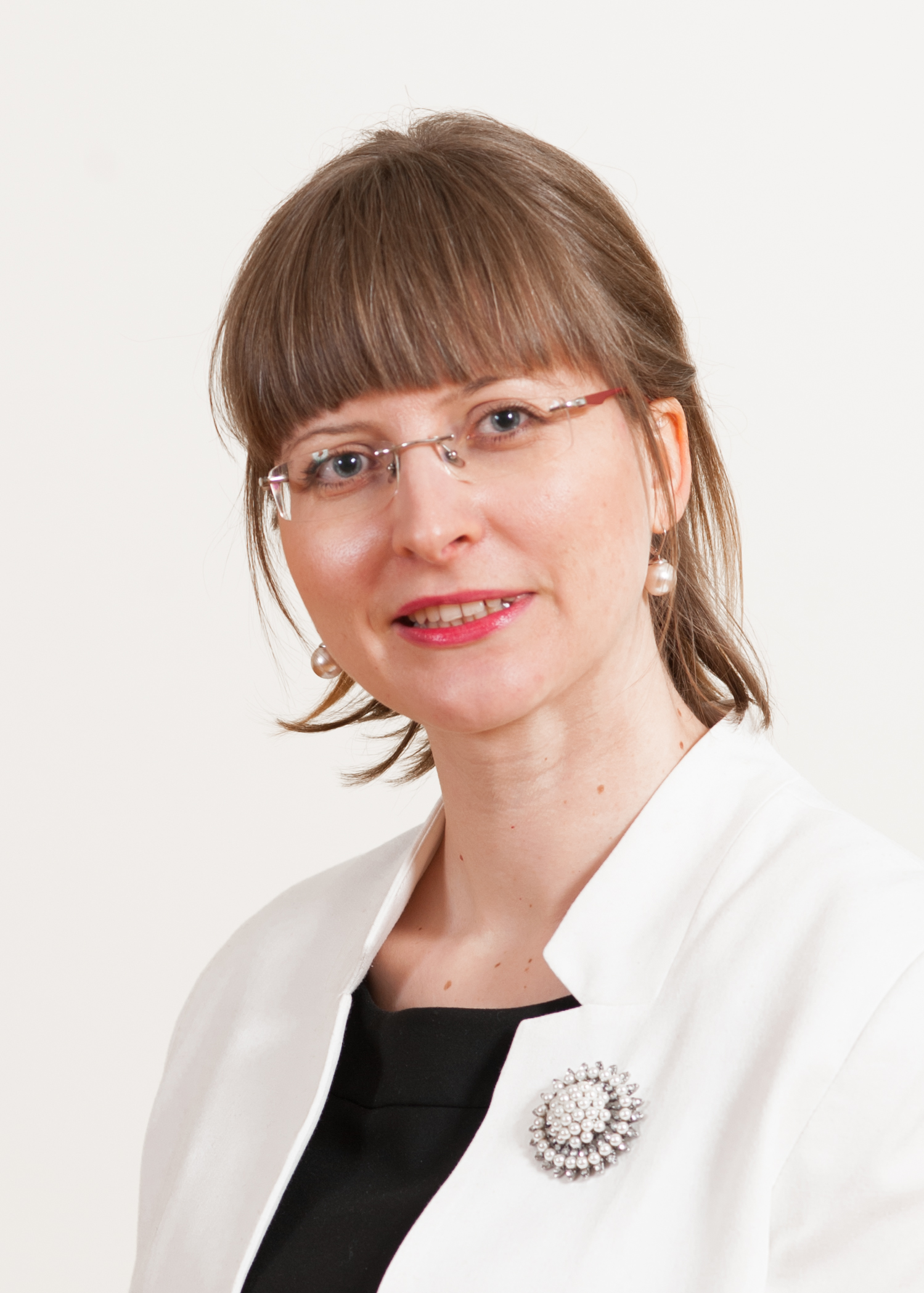

Külliki Kübarsepp (born 27 June 1981 in Pühajärve, Valga County) is an Estonian political scientist and politician. She was a member of the XIII Riigikogu.

In 2006, she graduated from University of Tartu wirh a degree in political science. From 1999 to 2012 she was a member of Pro Patria Union/Pro Patria and Res Publica Union. Since 2014 she has been a member of the Estonian Free Party.

Kübarsepp is in a relationship with fellow Estonian Free Party politician Andres Herkel, with whom she has a daughter.
