= 2014 European Parliament election in Estonia =

- 25 May 2014

All 6 Estonian seats to the European Parliament
- Turnout: 36.52%
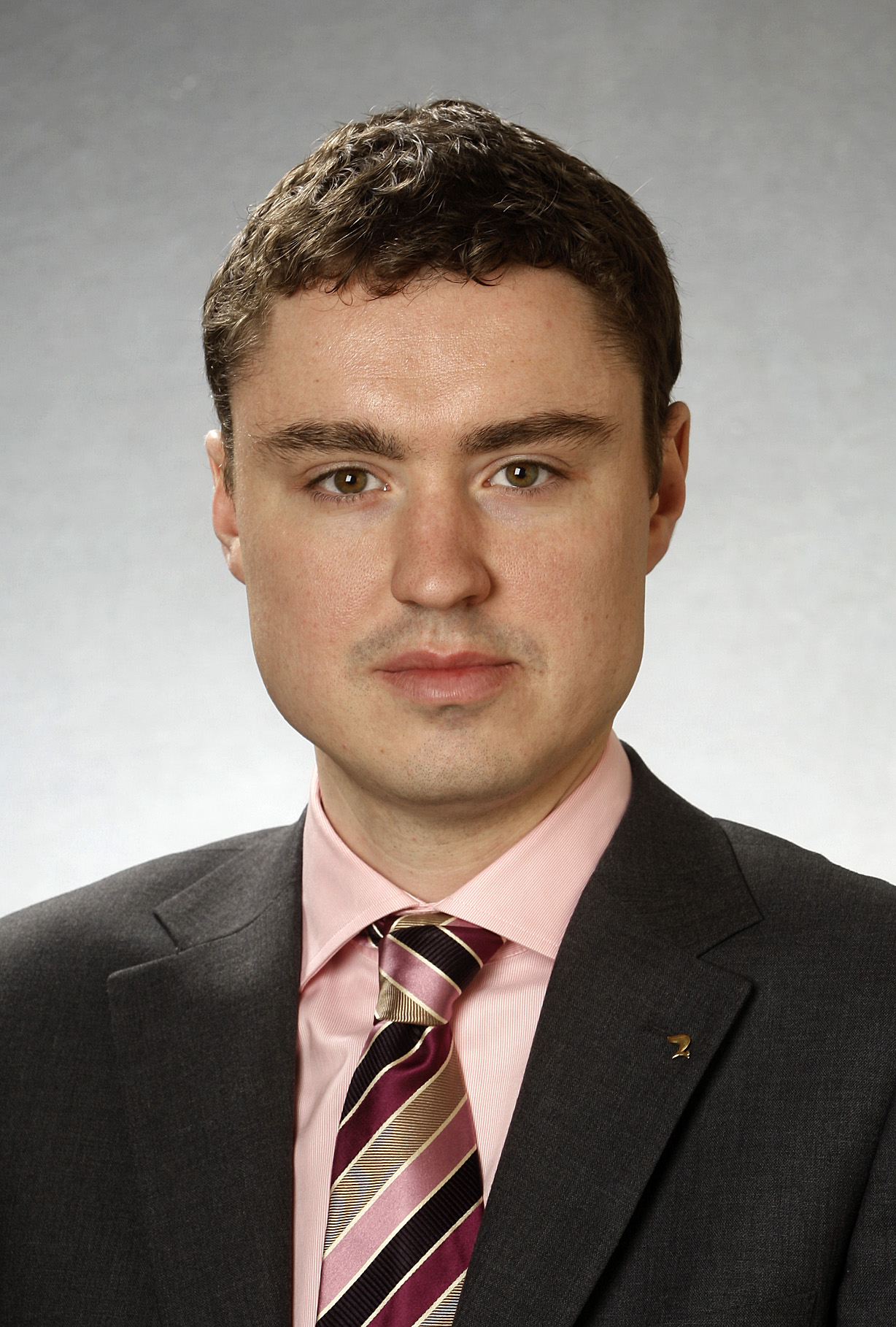

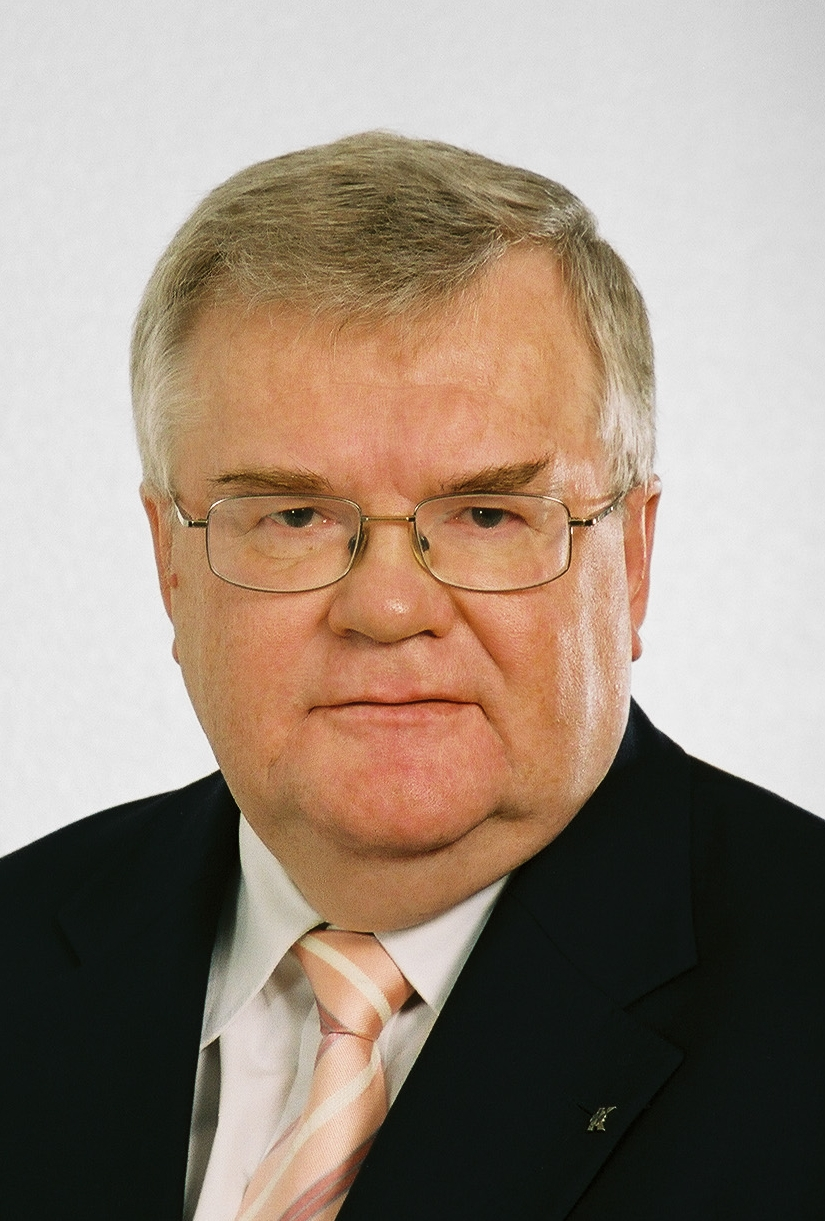

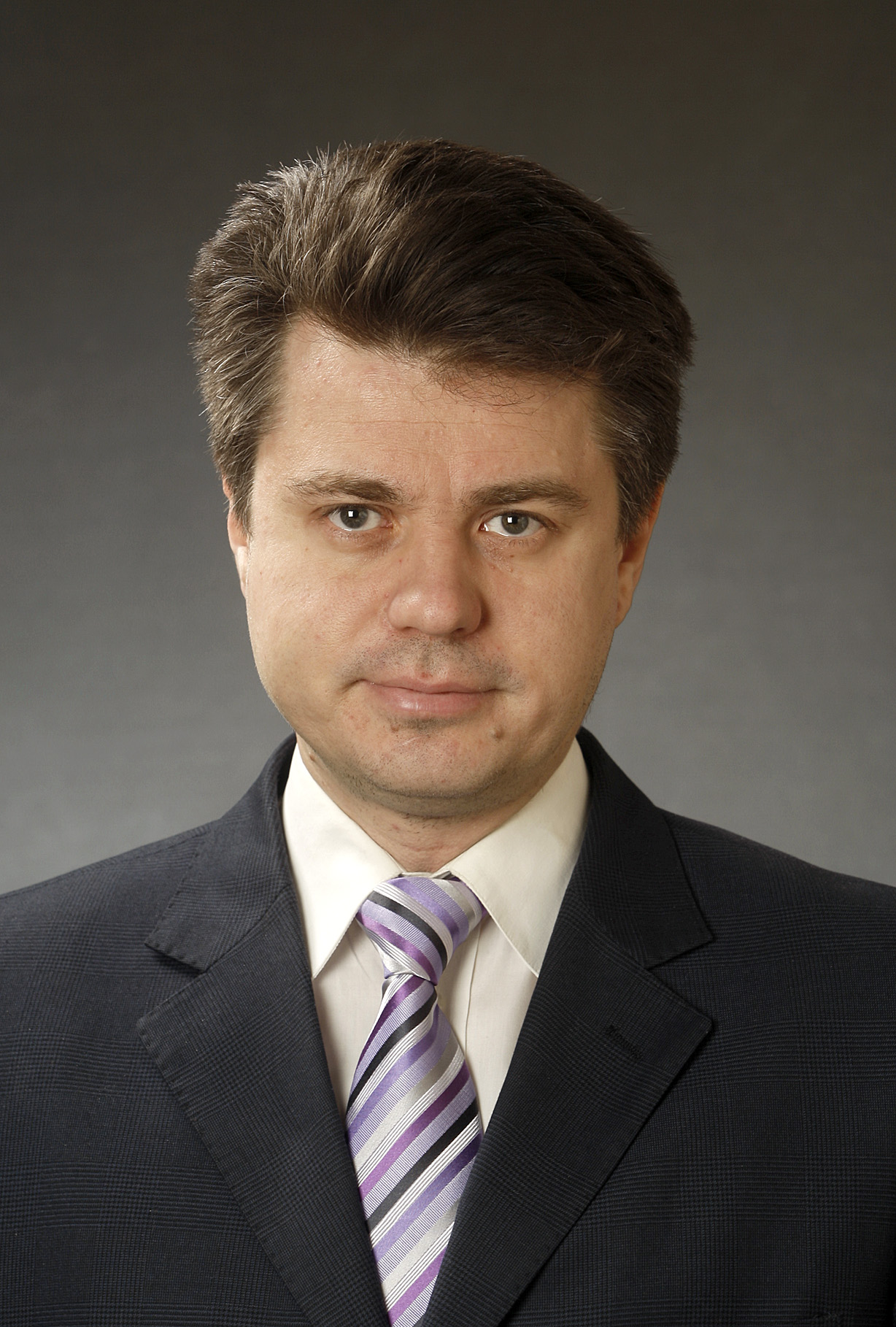

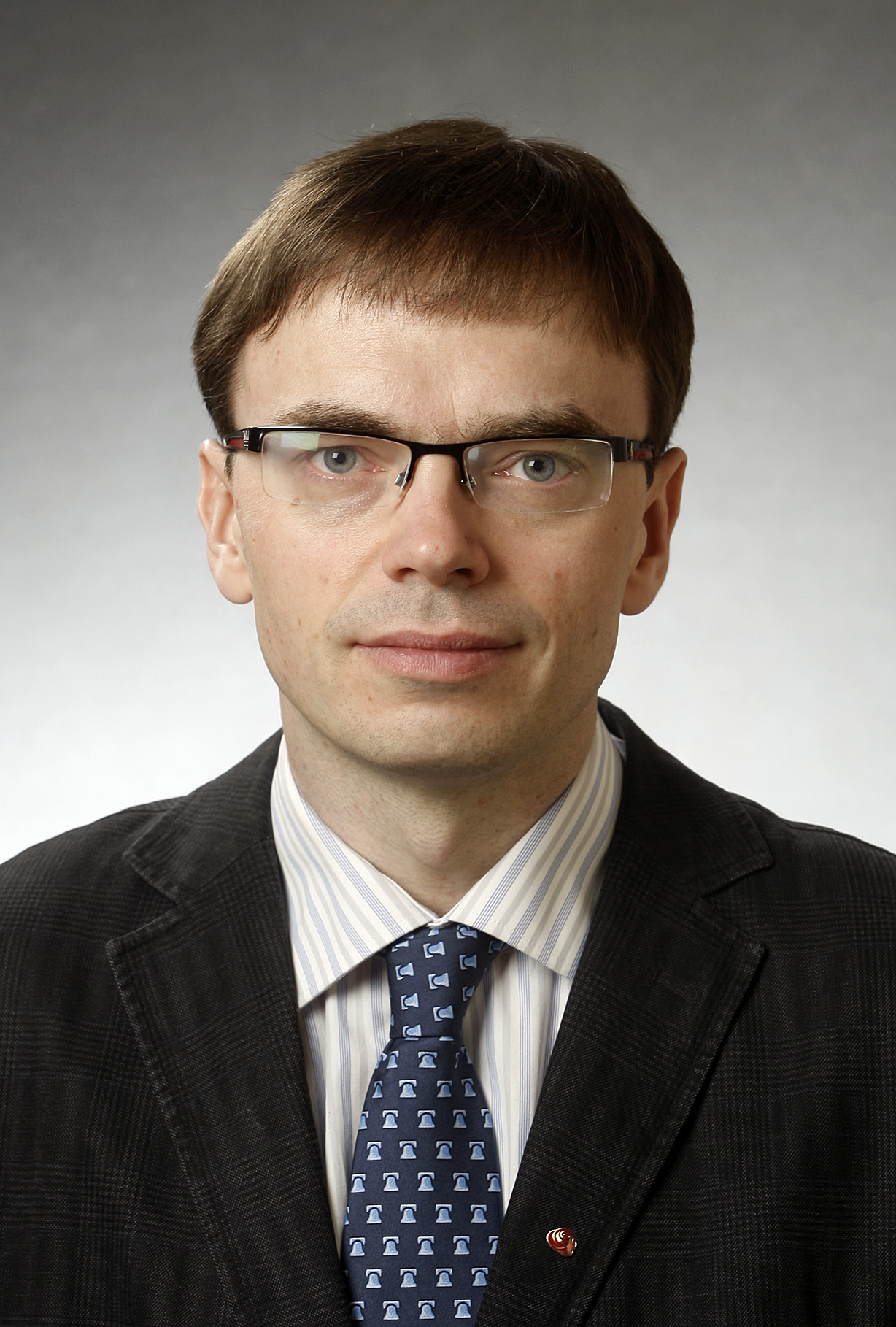

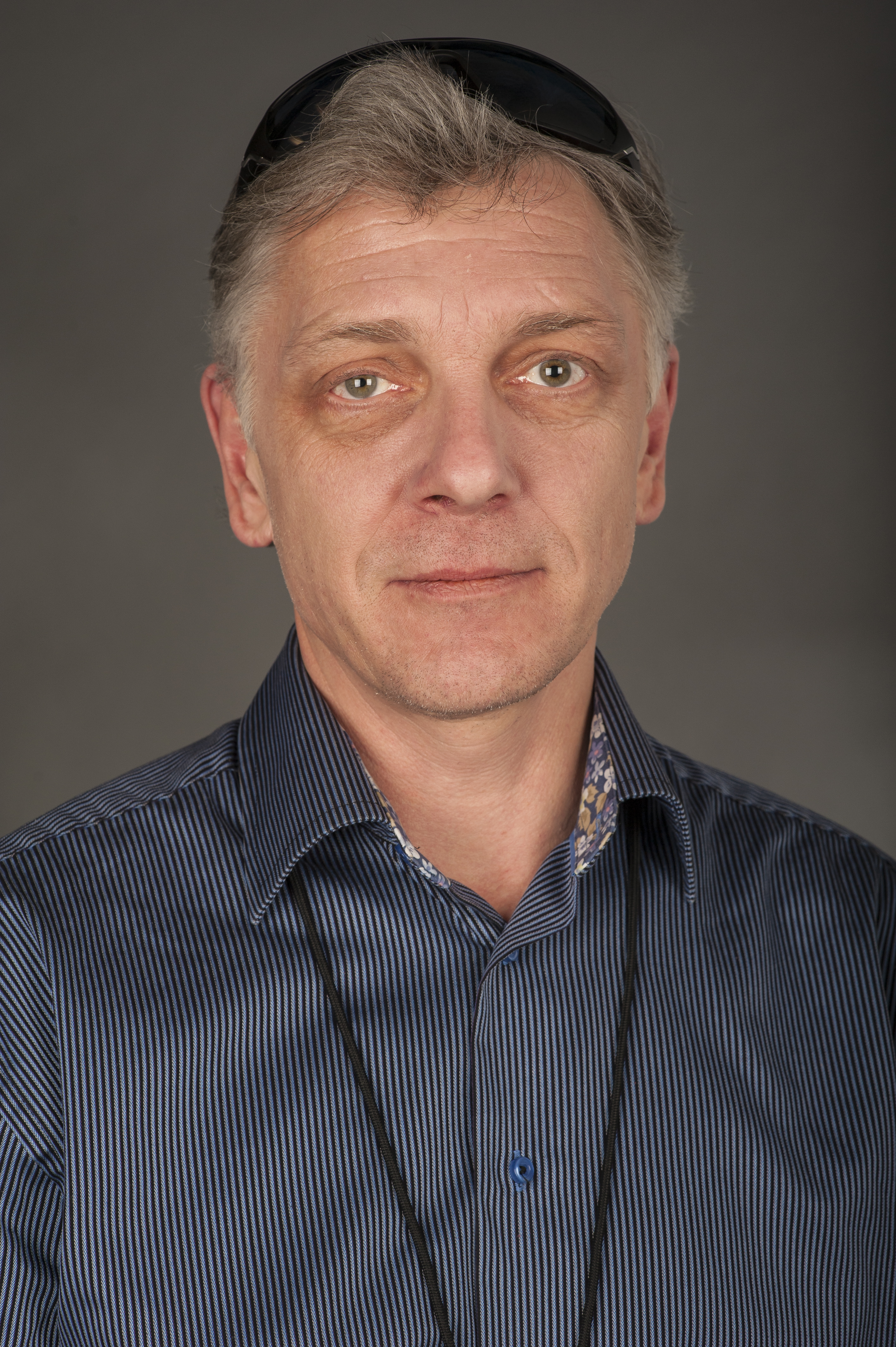

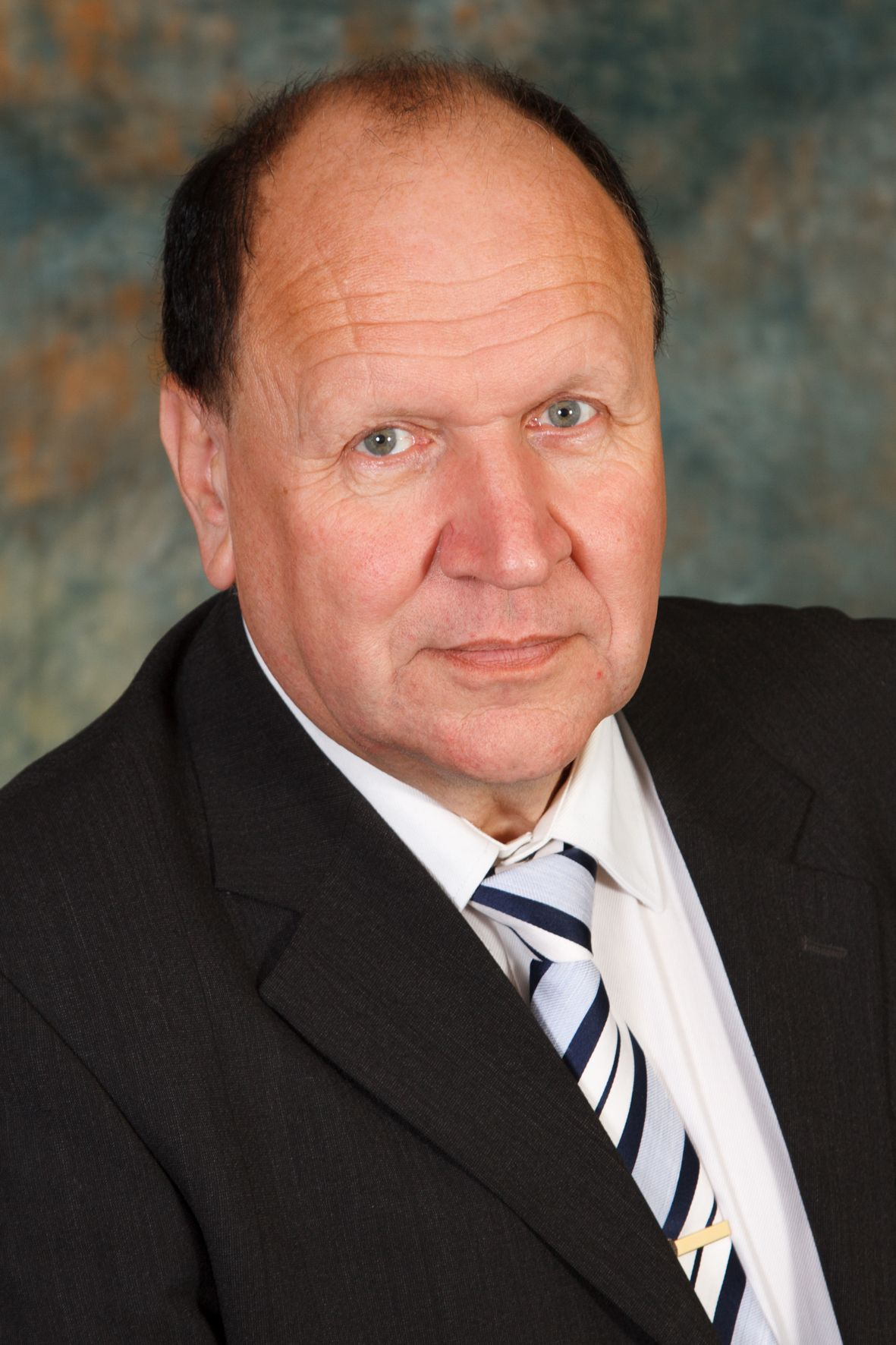
	First party	Second party	Third party
Leader	Taavi Rõivas	Edgar Savisaar	Urmas Reinsalu
Party	Reform	Centre	IRL
Alliance	ALDE	ALDE	EPP
Last election	15.3%, 1 seat	26.1%, 2 seats	12.2%, 1 seat
Seats won	2	1	1
Seat change	1 ▲	1 ▼	Steady
Popular vote	79,849	73,419	45,765
Percentage	24.3%	22.4%	13.9%
Swing	9.0pp ▲	3.7pp ▼	1.7pp ▲
	Fourth party	Fifth party	Sixth party
Leader	Sven Mikser	Indrek Tarand	Mart Helme
Party	SDE	Independent	EKRE
Alliance	PES	Greens/EFA
Last election	8.7%, 1 seat	25.8%, 1 seat	2.2%, no seats
Seats won	1	1	no seats
Seat change	Steady	Steady
Popular vote	44,550	43,369	13,247
Percentage	13.6%	13.2%	4.0%
Swing	4.9pp ▲	12.6pp ▼	1.8pp ▲

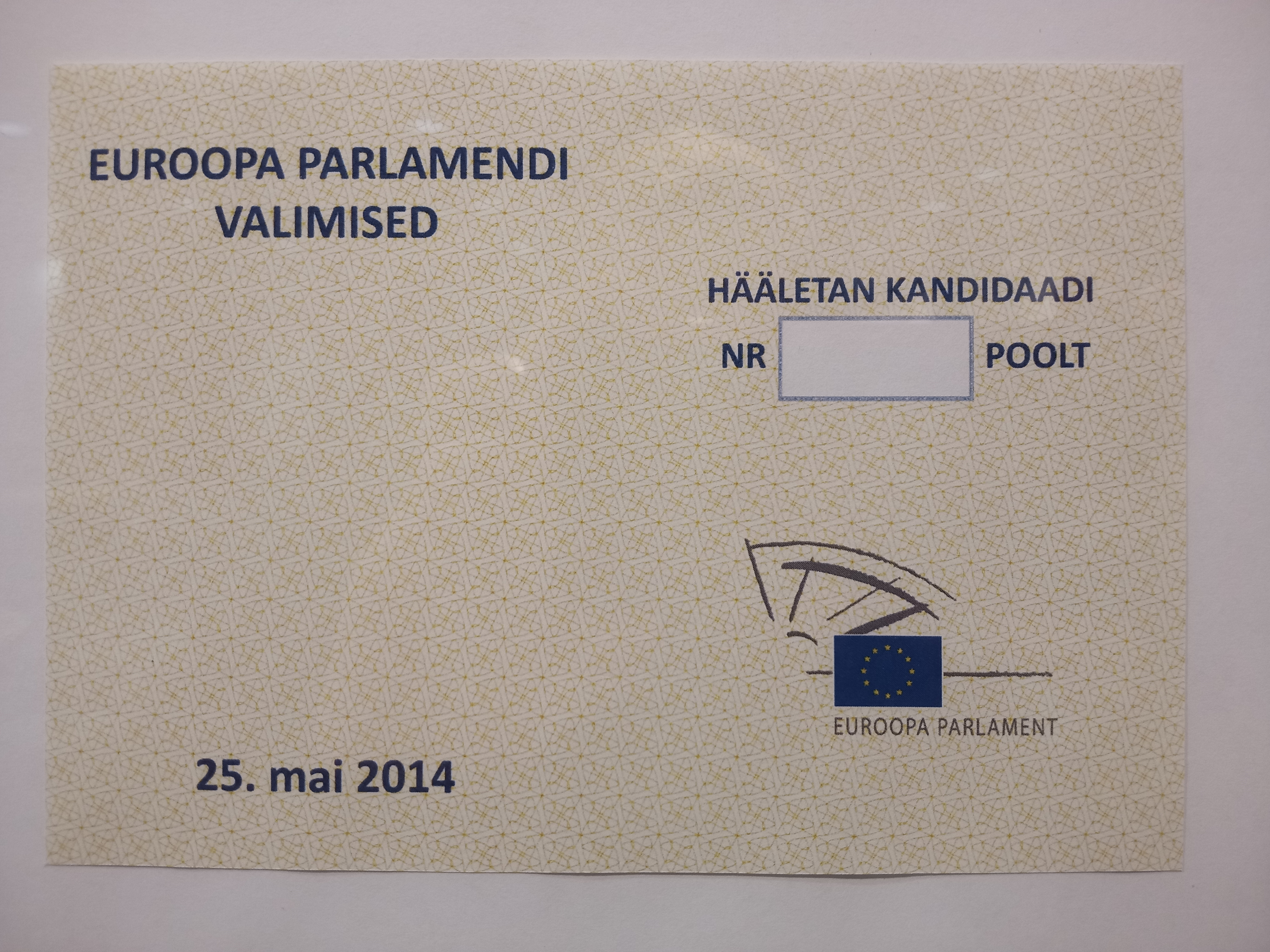
Ballot paper

An election for Members of the European Parliament from Estonia to the European Parliament was held on 25 May 2014.

== Opinion polls ==
Date	Polling firm	Centre	Tarand	Reform	IRL	SDE	Greens	~~Helme~~^{1}	EKRE	~~Klenski~~^{2}	EIP	Others
25 May 2014	Election results	22.4	13.2	24.3	13.9	13.6			4.0		1.3	7.4
17 May 2014	TNS Emor	22	15	19	17	19			4		1.6	5
19 April 2014	TNS Emor	16	11	16	17	16			3			
7 June 2009	Election results	26.1	25.8	15.3	12.2	8.7	2.7	2.5	2.2^{3}	1.8	–	2.6

^{1} Not running independently in the elections.
^{2} Not running in the elections.
^{3} As People's Union of Estonia

== Results ==
Party	Votes	%	Seats	+/–
Estonian Reform Party	79,849	24.31	2	+1
Estonian Centre Party	73,419	22.35	1	–1
Pro Patria and Res Publica Union	45,765	13.93	1	0
Social Democratic Party	44,550	13.56	1	0
Conservative People's Party of Estonia	13,247	4.03	0	0
Estonian Independence Party	4,158	1.27	0	New
Estonian Greens	986	0.30	0	0
Estonian United Left Party	226	0.07	0	0
Independents	66,293	20.18	1	0
Total	328,493	100.00	6	0
Valid votes	328,493	99.61		
Invalid/blank votes	1,273	0.39		
Total votes	329,766	100.00		
Registered voters/turnout	902,873	36.52		
Source: VVK

== Elected Members of the European Parliament ==
- Andrus Ansip (Estonian Reform Party) (Replaced by Urmas Paet on 3 November 2014)
- Yana Toom (Estonian Centre Party)
- Tunne-Väldo Kelam (Union of Pro Patria and Res Publica)
- Marju Lauristin (Social Democratic Party)
- Indrek Tarand (independent)
- Kaja Kallas (Estonian Reform Party)

== See also ==
- 2014 European Parliament election
- Politics of Estonia
- List of political parties in Estonia
