= Estonian Party for the Future =

Estonian political party

Estonian Party for the Future Eesti Tulevikuerakond
- Abbreviation: TULE
- President: Viktoria Lukats
- Vice President: Vahur Kollom
- Founded: 20 August 2020
- Dissolved: 26 May 2024
- Merger of: Free Party; Biodiversity Party
- Succeeded by: Free Party (2024)
- Headquarters: Tällevere
- Membership (2021): ▲934
- Ideology: Agrarianism; Green politics
- Political position: Centre to centre-right
- Colours: Black; Green

Website
- tulevikuerakond.com

The Estonian Party for the Future (Estonian: Eesti Tulevikuerakond, TULE) was an agrarian political party in Estonia. On 26 May 2024, the party rebranded to the old name Estonian Free Party.

It was founded in 2020 from the merger of the Estonian Free Party and the Estonian Biodiversity Party. At the February 2021 general assembly, Lauri Tõnspoeg was elected president of the party, and Vahur Kollom was elected vice-president. Urmas Heinaste, Mati Kose, Viktoria Lukats, Urmas Ott and Teet Randma were elected to the party board.

Logo before 2021
