= Estonian National Liberals - Free Party =

Estonian political party

Estonian National Liberals - Free Party Eesti Rahvusliberaalid - Vabaerakond
- Abbreviation: ERLV
- Leader: Märt Meesak
- Founded: 26 May 2024 (de facto)
- Preceded by: Party for the Future
- Membership (2024): 654
- Ideology: National liberalism
- Political position: Centre-right
- Colours: Blue
- Riigikogu: 0 / 101
- European Parliament: 0 / 7

Website
- vabaerakond.ee

The Estonian National Liberals - Free Party (Estonian: Eesti Rahvusliberaalid - Vabaerakond), or Free Party colloquially, formerly (2024-2026) named Free Party Come To Your Senses (Estonian: Vabaerakond Aru Pähe) due to legal barriers prohibiting adopting the adoption of the name of a previously or presently existing party, is an Estonian centre-right political party formed after the rebranding of Party for the Future on 26 May 2024, effectively presented as a revival of the former party of the same name.

The party changed its name to the current one in May 2026.

== Political positions ==
The Free Party describes itself as centre-right and endorses the construction of a nuclear power plant in Estonia. The party considers people's sexual orientation to be "their free choice" but not "a privilege". It endorses deregulation as to avoid a market of "subsidy-dependent entrepreneurship". It supports Estonian membership in NATO and the European Union but is critical of "uncritical adoption of EU directives" and wants Estonia to be exempt from the trade bloc's CO_{2} quota. It considers Russia to be Estonia's only existential threat.

The party's leader Märt Meesak agreed with labelling the party as centre-right, called it ideologically national liberal, and compared its values to the ones espoused by Polish Prime Minister Donald Tusk and Japanese Prime Minister Sanae Takaichi.
