= Andres Herkel =

Estonian politician

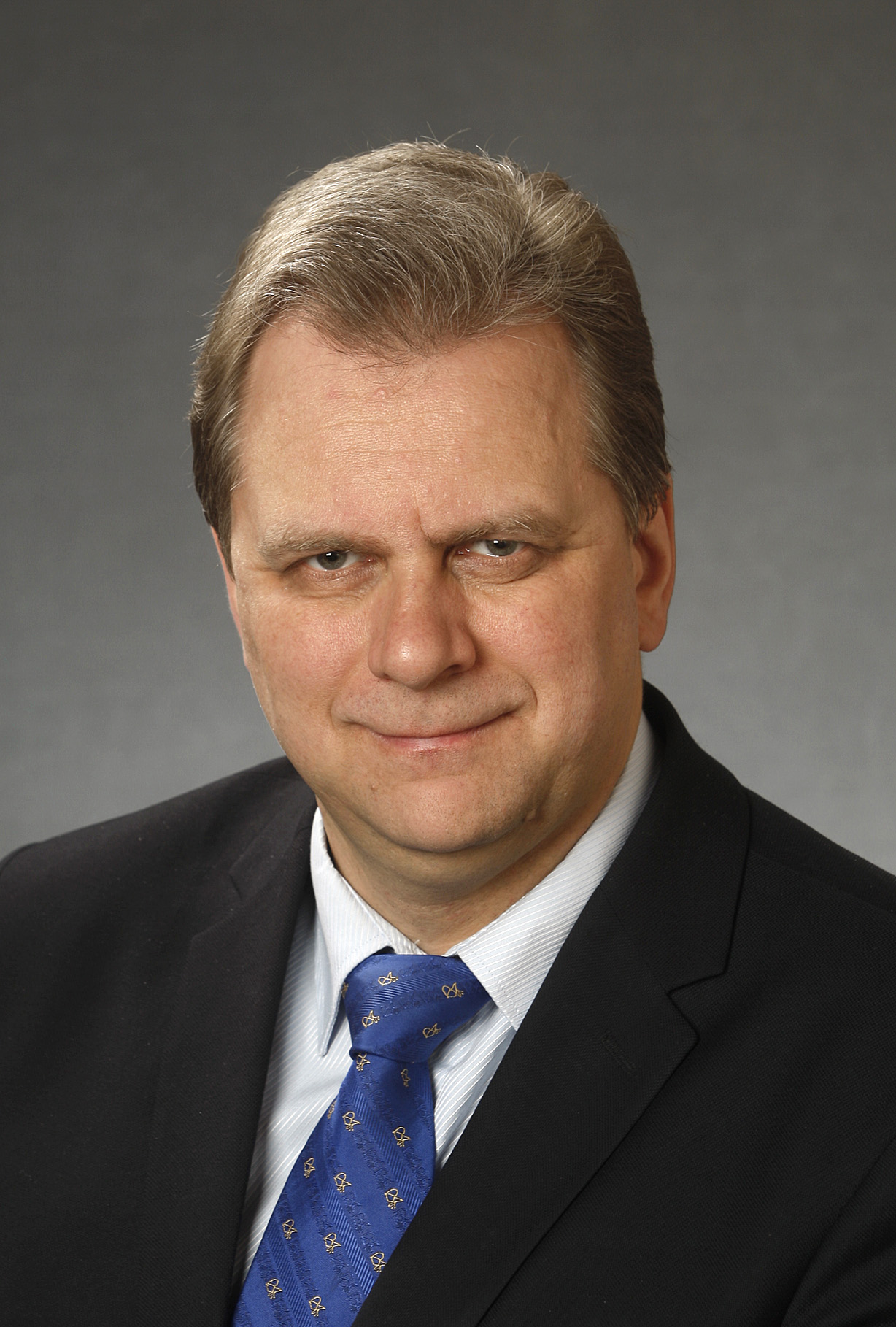

Leader of the Free Party
- In office 2014 – 24 April 2017
- Preceded by: Party established
- Succeeded by: Artur Talvik
- In office 12 May 2018 – 30 September 2018
- Preceded by: Artur Talvik
- Succeeded by: Kaul Nurm

Personal details
- Born: 14 August 1962 (age 64) Tallinn, then part of Estonian SSR, Soviet Union
- Party: Free Party
- Domestic partner: Külliki Kübarsepp
- Education: University of Tartu

Andres Herkel (born 14 August 1962) is an Estonian politician. He started his public activities in the late 1980s. From the very beginning of the independence movement in Estonia, he affiliated himself with pro-independence forces, which had close ties with Soviet-era dissidents. He played an active role in building up the free press in the then occupied Estonia, being among the founders of the Independent Info Centre in 1988. He was the leader of the Estonian Free Party.

== Education and training ==
His alma mater is the University of Tartu, where he obtained a first degree in psychology (cum laude, 1985) and an M.A. degree in history (1998, thesis on ancient Indian philosophy). He was greatly inspired by his then professor, well-known Estonian orientalist Linnart Mäll (1938-2010), whose work in the Unrepresented Peoples and Nations Organization (UNPO) he followed with keen interest.

== Professional career ==
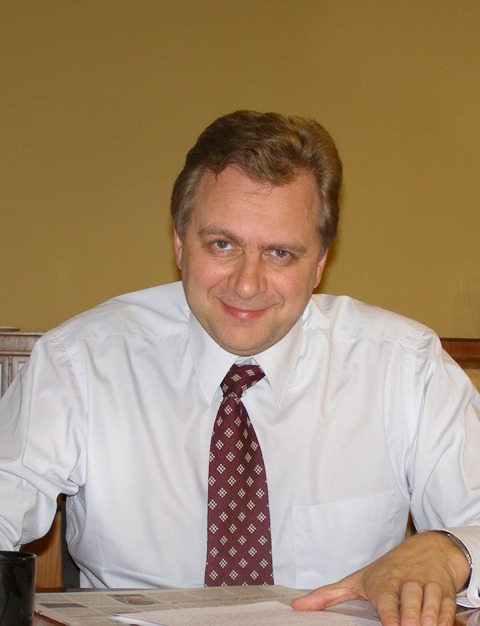
Andres Herkel in 2006

Andres Herkel began his professional career as researcher in the Estonian Institute of Pedagogical Research (1985-1989), followed by posts of editor of the literary journal Vikerkaar (1990-1991), editor-in-chief of Eesti Elu/Kultuur ja Elu (Estonian Life/Culture and Life) journal (1991-1992) and lecturer in the Estonian Institute of Humanities. In 1993-1999 he worked as Media Adviser in the Pro Patria faction of the Riigikogu (Estonian Parliament).

In 1994, Herkel joined the conservative Pro Patria party (now known as the Union of Pro Patria and Res Publica - IRL). In 1999 he was for the first time elected to Riigikogu. In 2004 - 2007 he was Chairperson of the Pro Patria faction in Riigikogu. He was re-elected for his fourth term in parliament in the March 2011 elections.

In national politics, Herkel is well known for his commitment to conservative values and for his conciliatory approach. He was the driving force behind the adoption of the 2002 statement on crimes of communism in the Estonian Parliament, which was approved by a wide consensus.

Throughout his political career, Herkel has also focused on international affairs. Since 2003 he has been member of the Parliamentary Assembly of the Council of Europe (PACE), where he has held significant positions: Head of the Estonian delegation since 2007, vice-president of the PACE (2009-2011), rapporteur on the honouring of obligations and commitments by Azerbaijan (2004-2010) and the situation in Belarus (since 2011). In Azerbaijan his stern stance with the authorities won him much respect among human rights defenders and civil society activists. He has participated in various PACE election observation missions in Azerbaijan, Ukraine, Georgia and Moldova. He is also committed to pursuing the cause of human rights in the Northern Caucasus, Cuba and Tibet. His articles on foreign policy are regularly published in the Estonian press.

In his campaign for the March 2011 parliamentary elections in Estonia, Herkel used small pepper-bags called "Herkel’s pepper-mix" with an aim of convincing his electorate that 'too sweet' campaign promises are counterproductive and unrealistic. He warned against repeating the same fiscal mistakes that had been made before the 2008-2010 economic crises in Estonia.

Herkel is a long-standing member of the Estonian Broadcasting Council (1994-2000 and 2007–2011) and vice-president of Estonian Academic Oriental Society (2000-2011).

== Publications ==
Andres Herkel has published several books in Estonian, including The Russian Puzzle (Vene mõistatus, 2007), Cuba in my Heart (Kuuba südames, together with former PM Mart Laar, 2008) and Azerbaijani letters (Aserbaidžaani kirjad, 2010). The latter is being translated into English.

Herkel has also published poetry and is an essay-writer in Estonia (prizes by the main Estonian literary journal Looming (1993) and cultural weekly Sirp (1998)).

== Languages ==
Andres Herkel is a native speaker of Estonian. He is fluent in English and Russian, has good knowledge of French, German and Finnish. In his student years he also studied classical Sanskrit.

== Honours ==
- Estonia: 4th Class of the Order of the White Star; (received 23 February 2005)
- Belgium: Grand cordon of the Order of Leopold II (2008)
- Officer of the Order of Merit of the Republic of Poland, (2009)
- France: Officer of the Ordre national du Mérite, (2011)
