= Estonian Democratic Labour Party (1989) =

Former Estonian political party

Estonian Democratic Labour Party Eesti Demokraatlik Tööerakond
- Leader: Vello Saatpalu
- Founded: February 1989
- Dissolved: 8 September 1989
- Merged into: ESDP
- Ideology: Social democracy
- Political position: Center-left
- International affiliation: Socialist International

The Estonian Democratic Labour Party (Estonian: Eesti Demokraatlik Tööerakond, EDTE) was a social-democratic political party in Estonia (then the Estonian SSR). The party was founded in February 1989. The party was led by Vello Saatpalu. In June 1989, the party sent a delegation to the Socialist International congress in Stockholm.

On September 8, 1989, the party merged into the Estonian Social Democratic Party.
