= Mati Talvik =

Estonian television journalist (1942–2018)

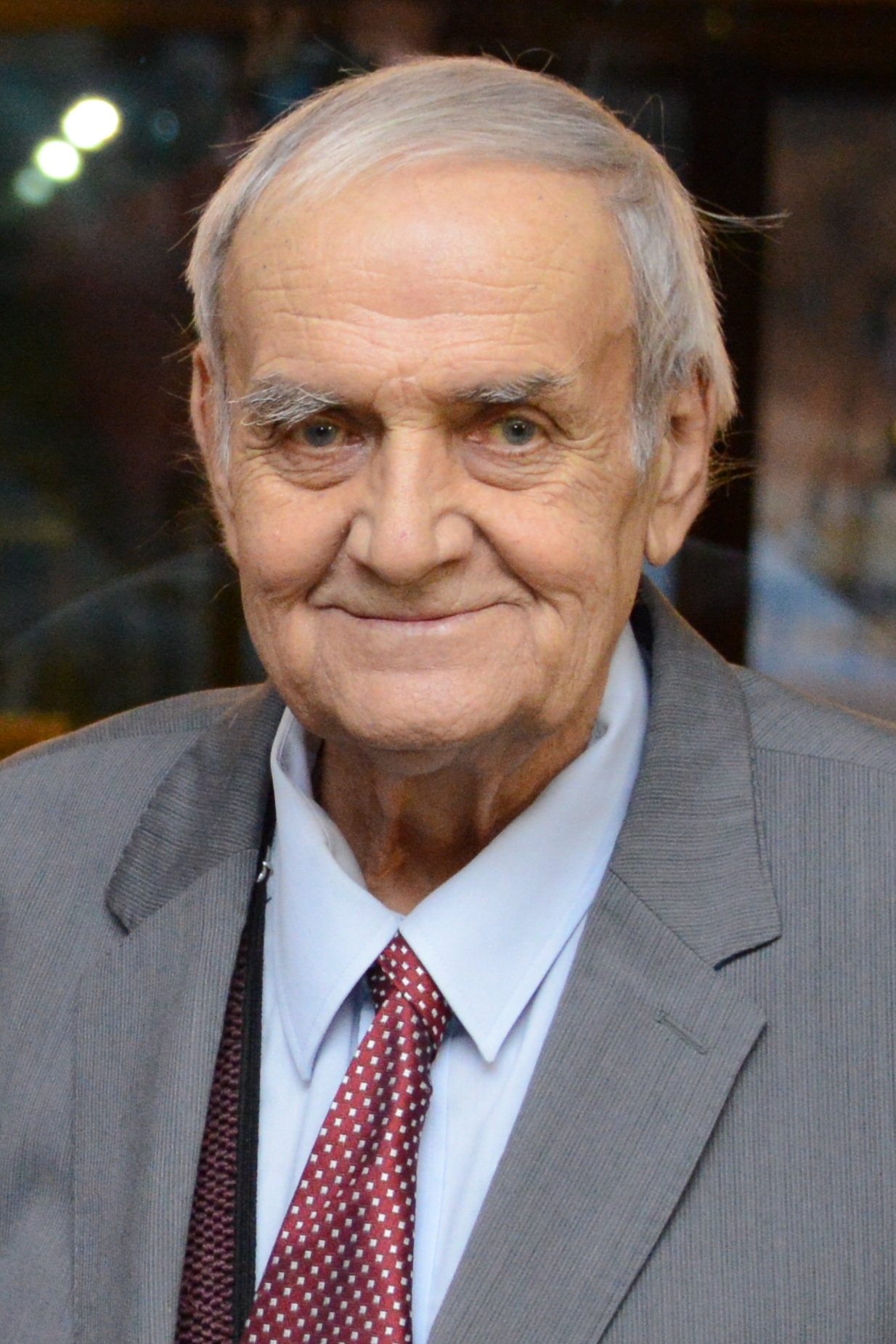
Mati Talvik

Mati Talvik (11 April 1942 – 25 July 2018) was an Estonian television journalist.

Talvik was born and raised in Tallinn. He was the son of lawyer Edgar Talvik. His uncle was the singer and journalist Kalmer Tennosaar.

From 1967 until 1970, he studied at Tartu State University in the journalism speciality. In 1981, he graduated from Leningrad Higher Party School (later Leningrad Communist University).

From 1968, he worked at Eesti Televisioon (ETV). He created, edited and directed many popular television programs and series, including Käokava (1971-1972), Eesti aja lood (2007-2010) and Ajavaod (2010-2011).

Awards:

- 1980: Jaan Anvelt prize
- 1982: Meritorious journalist of the Estonian SSR
- 1985: Valdo Pant prize
- 2006: Order of the White Star, IV class.
- 2008: Kuldmikrofon: Estonian Broadcasting Union Golden Microphone Award

== Filmography ==
Director of the documental films:

- Vilma (1979)
- Piimamehed Põlvast (1980)
- Linn põlevatel kividel (1981)
- Moonsundi sügis (1984)
- Balti loorberid (2009)
