= Lauri Läänemets =

Estonian politician (born 1983)

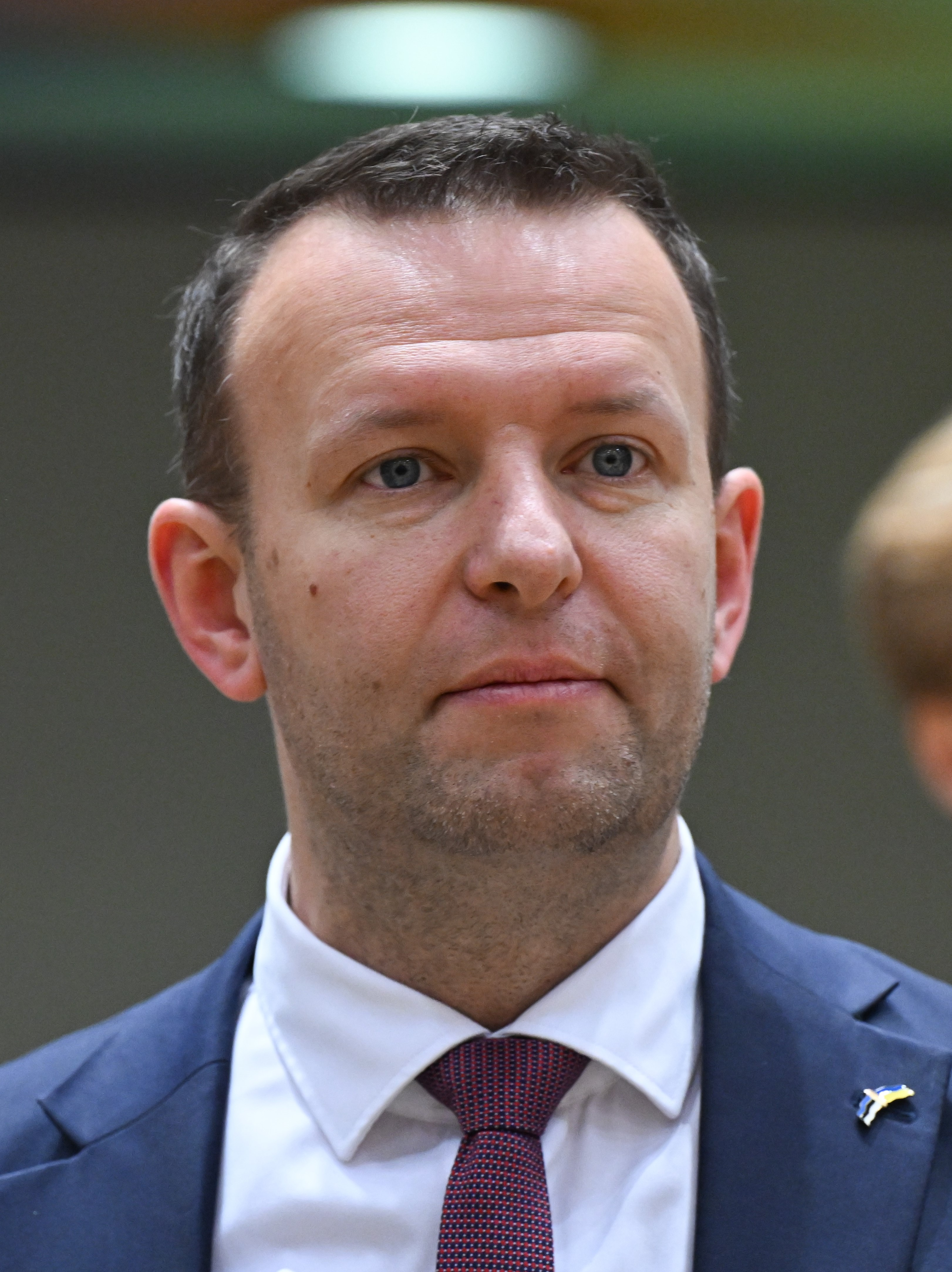
- Läänemets in 2024

Minister of the Interior
- In office 18 July 2022 – 11 March 2025
- Prime Minister: Kaja Kallas; Kristen Michal
- Preceded by: Kalle Laanet (acting)
- Succeeded by: Hanno Pevkur (acting)

Leader of the Estonian Social Democratic Party
- Incumbent
- Assumed office 5 February 2022
- Preceded by: Indrek Saar

Member of the Riigikogu
- Incumbent
- Assumed office 13 June 2019

Personal details
- Born: 31 January 1983 (age 43) Tallinn, then part of Estonian SSR, Soviet Union
- Party: SDE (2011-present)
- Other political affiliations: People's Union (2008-2010)
- Children: 1

Lauri Läänemets (born 31 January 1983) is an Estonian politician who served as Minister of Interior Affairs and is a member of the XV Riigikogu.

== Biography ==
In 2007 he graduated from Tallinn University with a degree in recreation management.

=== Political career ===
Läänemets was a member of the Estonian People's Union between 2008 and 2010.

After leaving the People's Union, Läänemets joined the Estonian Social Democratic Party in 2010. And led the party's youth wing between 2011 and 2013.

From 2013 to 2017 he was mayor of the Väätsa Rural Municipality.

At the 2019 Estonian parliamentary election, Läänemets ran for a seat in Riigikogu electoral district no. 8. He failed to gain enough votes for a mandate, but went on to take up Marina Kaljurand's seat as a substitute member a few months later after Kaljurand was elected to serve in the European Parliament instead.

Lauri Läänemets was elected chairman of the Social Democratic Party (SDE) on 5 February 2022 by party members at the General Assembly.

==== Minister of the Interior ====
On 18 July 2022, he was sworn in as a Minister of the Interior as a member of Kaja Kallas's second cabinet. He retained his position in Kaja Kallas's third cabinet.

In December 2023, Läänemets's car windows were smashed. Authorities later announced that the suspects were part of a coordinated “hybrid operation” by Russian intelligence to conduct sabotage and destabilization against the Estonian state.

In March 2024, Läänemets was placed on a wanted list by the Russian Ministry of Internal Affairs under "article of the criminal code". Russian law enforcement agencies later clarified Läänemets was placed on the wanted list due to destruction of Soviet monuments. A similar criminal charge was placed on Kaja Kallas, the Prime Minister of Estonia.

In April 2025, after initially retaining his position in Kristen Michal's first cabinet, the Social Democratic Party was sacked from the governing coalition, and Läänemets returned to his position as a member of parliament. He was eventually succeeded by Igor Taro as Minister of the Interior.
