= Russian Social Democratic Party of Estonia =

Defunct political party in Estonia

The Russian Social Democratic Party of Estonia (Estonian: Vene Sotsiaaldemokraatlik Partei Eestis) was a social democratic political party in Estonia (then the Estonian SSR). On September 8, 1989, the party merged into the Estonian Social Democratic Party.
