= Estonian Social Democratic Independence Party =

Estonian political party

The Estonian Social Democratic Independence Party (Estonian: Eesti Sotsiaaldemokraatlik Iseseisvuspartei, ESDIP) was a social democratic political party in Estonia (then the Estonian SSR), which advocated Estonian independence. The party was founded in May 1990. The party was led by Marju Lauristin.

On September 8, 1989, the party merged into the Estonian Social Democratic Party.
