= Social Democratic Party (Estonia) =

Political party in Estonia

Social Democratic Party Sotsiaaldemokraatlik Erakond
- Abbreviation: SDE
- Leader: Lauri Läänemets
- Founder: Marju Lauristin
- Founded: 8 September 1990; 35 years ago
- Headquarters: Toompuiestee 16, Tallinn 10137
- Youth wing: Young Social Democrats
- Membership (2021): ▼5,337
- Ideology: Social democracy Pro-Europeanism
- Political position: Centre-left
- European affiliation: Party of European Socialists
- European Parliament group: Progressive Alliance of Socialists and Democrats
- International affiliation: Progressive Alliance; Socialist International (1990–2017)
- Colours: Red
- Riigikogu: 14 / 101
- Municipalities: 91 / 1,688
- European Parliament: 2 / 7

Party flag

Website
- sotsid.ee

The Social Democratic Party (Estonian: Sotsiaaldemokraatlik Erakond, SDE) is a centre-left political party in Estonia. It is currently led by Lauri Läänemets. The party was formerly known as the Moderate People's Party (Estonian: Rahvaerakond Mõõdukad). The SDE has been a member of the Party of European Socialists since 16 May 2003 and was a member of the Socialist International from November 1990 to 2017. It is orientated towards the principles of social-democracy, and it supports Estonia's membership in the European Union. From April 2023 until March 2025, the party was a junior coalition partner in the third Kallas government and the Michal government.

== History ==
During the perestroika era, the Estonian Social Democratic Party (Eesti Sotsiaaldemokraatlik Partei, ESDP) was formed as Estonia's social-democratic movements merged in 1990. The movements were: the Estonian Democratic Labour Party, the Estonian Social Democratic Independence Party, the Russian Social Democratic Party of Estonia and the Estonian Socialist Party's Foreign Association (successor of Estonian Socialist Workers Party in exile). The ESDP's first leader was Marju Lauristin. They restored their contacts with the Socialist International in 1990. ESDP formed an electoral alliance with the agrarian Estonian Rural Centre Party (formed in 1990) for 1992 and 1995 elections. In 1996, after electoral defeat these two parties finally merged and named themselves the Moderates (Mõõdukad). The Moderates were accepted as a full member of the Socialist International at its 20th congress in September 1999.

In 1999, the Moderates and the centre-right People's Party, set up in May 1998 after a fusion of Peasants' Party and People's Party of Republicans and Conservatives (a 1994 splinter group from the Fatherland Alliance), formed the Moderate People's Party (Rahvaerakond Mõõdukad). The seemingly unlikely decision to fuse took place on 29 May 1999, with some foreign commentators drawing parallels with 'right-wing socialists'. In November the same year, the unification was formally approved by party's general assembly.

The Moderates' contacts with People's Party predecessors had started in 1998. The two parties had a joint list in 1999 parliamentary election and formed a governing coalition with Pro Patria Union and Reform Party. In 2003, the Moderate People's Party joined the Party of European Socialists. After disappointing election results in 2003, the party renamed itself the Social Democratic Party (SDE) on 7 February 2004.

It was the most successful party in the 2004 European Parliamentary Election, obtaining 36.8% of the national vote (most of which went to their leading candidate Toomas Hendrik Ilves) and returning three MEPs.

The SDE is committed to the social market economy model, in addition to conventional social-democratic values including equality, social justice, solidarity, and the welfare state. On 10 May 2005, former social-liberals Peeter Kreitzberg and Sven Mikser joined them. On 28 November former social-liberal Mark Soosaar re-joined the SDE. The party was in opposition from 2002 on, but they participated talks for a common alternative presidential candidate to Arnold Rüütel, SDE's Toomas Hendrik Ilves was elected on 23 September 2006 as the next president of Estonia (apart from the Social Democrats, he was supported by the Reform Party of Estonia, Pro Patria Union and Res Publica deputies).

After last elections to the local government councils on 16 October 2005, the party in most major cities is in opposition, but are a part of the governing coalition in Rakvere and Tapa. The party improved its position in most areas. In Tallinn, it formed a joint list with the agrarian People's Union, which got six seats out of 63 seats with 11.1% share of votes. Comparing to 2003. elections to the local government council in Tallinn SDE and People's Union gained seats. In the 2003 election, SDE got a 4.9% share of votes and People's Union 3.4% share of votes, which were both below a 5% election threshold. In Estonia, SDE local lists won 6.43% share of votes. In 2003, they got only 4.39% share of votes nationally. SDE is today represented on 65 local councils out of 206 and is governing in 20 local councils. After the 2003 election, the party was represented in 104 local councils out of 247.

SDE's aim in the 2007 Estonian parliamentary election was to win at least 17 seats out of 101. Independent member of current Riigikogu Liina Tõnisson ran as a candidate in their list. All SDE's MEPs and their current MPs were candidates in the 2007 election. The party got 58,354 votes (10.6% of the total), a gain of +3.6%; it won 10 seats in the new Riigikogu, a gain of four.

In April 2007, the Social Democrats joined the coalition government led by the Estonian Reform Party.

In the 2011 parliamentary election on 6 March 2011, the SDE received 17.1% of the vote and 19 seats.

The small Russian Party in Estonia merged into the SDE in 2012.

Following the resignation of Prime Minister Andrus Ansip, a new cabinet was sworn in on 26 March 2014, with Taavi Rõivas of the Reform Party serving as Prime Minister in coalition with the SDE.

In the 2014 European elections held on 25 May 2014, the SDE won 13.6% of the national vote, electing a single Member of the European Parliament.

In the 2015 parliamentary election on 1 March 2015, the SDE received 15.2% of the vote and 15 seats in the Riigikogu. After the coalition formation with the Reform Party and Pro Patria and Res Publica Union (IRL), MP Jevgeni Ossinovski announced that he would challenge Sven Mikser in the party congress on 30 May 2015. Mikser however stepped down before the election at the congress and Ossinovski was chosen as the new party leader. On 7 November 2016, the Social Democratic Party and IRL announced that they were asking Prime Minister Taavi Rõivas to resign and were planning on negotiating a new majority government. In the following vote of confidence on 9 November, the majority of Riigikogu voted in favour of removing the prime minister's government.

On 23 November 2016, a coalition government led by Estonian Centre Party (EK) leader Jüri Ratas consisting of EK, SDE and IRL was sworn in. This cabinet governed until 29 April 2019, when it was brought does by a vote of no confidence when the SDE and IRL sided with the opposition parties.

In the 2019 parliamentary election held on 3 March 2019, the SDE received 9.8% of the vote and 10 seats. In the 2019 European elections on 26 May 2019, the party won 23.3% of the national vote and two seats in the European Parliament.

The SDE returned to government on 18 July 2022 as a junior member of second Kallas government, led by Reform Party leader Kaja Kallas, and also including the Isamaa party.

In the 2023 parliamentary election, the SDE received 9.3% of the vote and nine seats. Following the election on 7 March, Prime Minister Kallas invited the SDE and Estonia 200 for preliminary talks aimed at forming a new coalition government. A coalition agreement between the three parties was reached by 7 April, giving SDE three ministerial positions, and was officially signed on 10 April. On 17 April, the third Kallas government was sworn into office.

One year on from the 2023 Estonian parliamentary election, the Social Democrats remained the only party in the government coalition to avoid losing support in polling. This was attributed to the party members' public statements, especially those of the leader of the party Lauri Läänemets, setting the Social Democrats apart from the two economically liberal parties in the coalition. Moreover, the party gained MPs and members from the defections out of the Centre Party, including seeing its number of MPs increase from nine to 13.

== Leaders ==
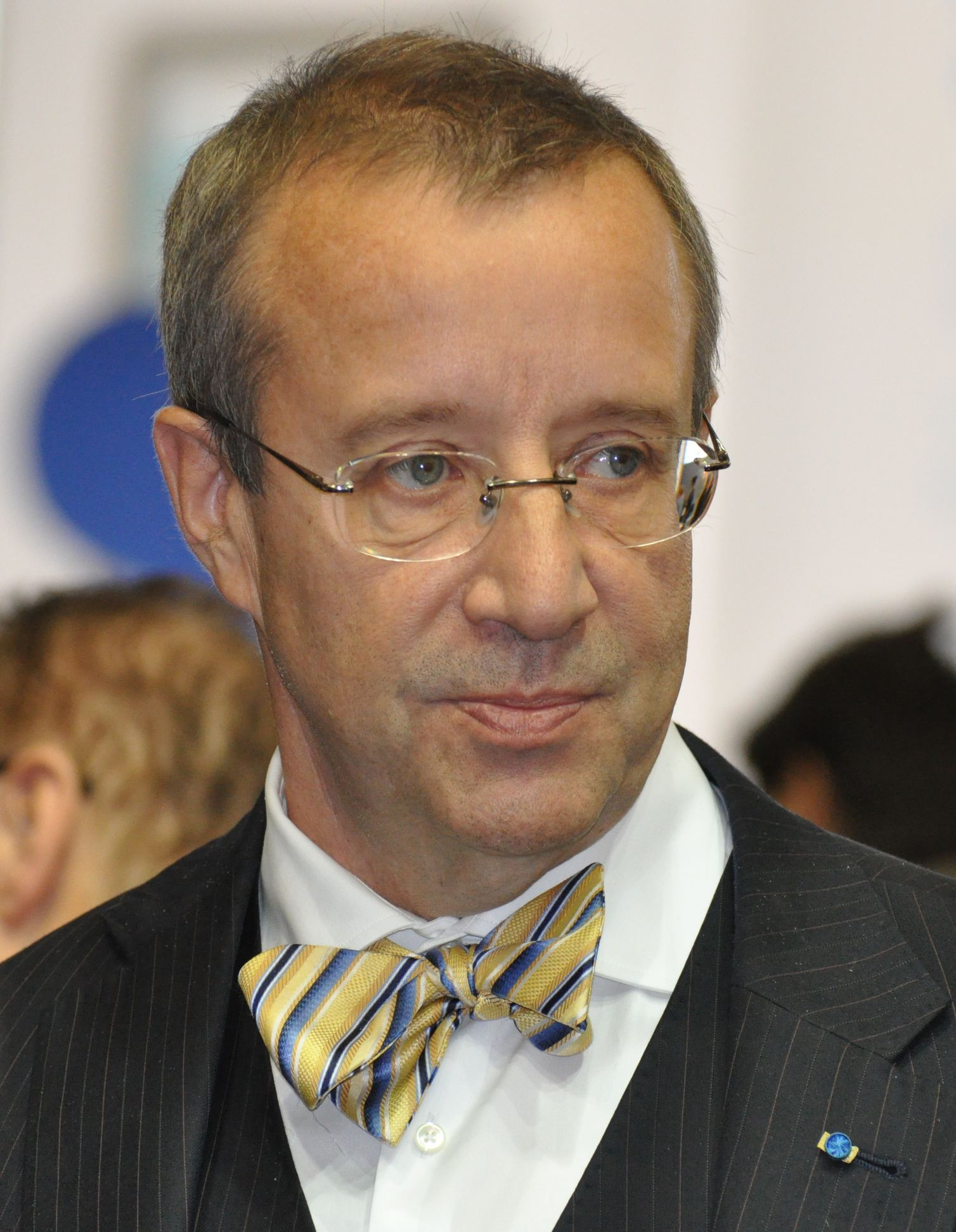
Toomas Hendrik Ilves is a former President of Estonia

- Marju Lauristin (1990–1995)
- Eiki Nestor (1995–1996)
- Andres Tarand (1996–2001)
- Toomas Hendrik Ilves (2001–2002)
- Ivari Padar (2002–2009)
- Jüri Pihl (2009–2010)
- Sven Mikser (2010–2015)
- Jevgeni Ossinovski (2015–2019)
- Indrek Saar (2019–2022)
- Lauri Läänemets (2022–present)

== Election results ==
=== Parliamentary elections ===
Election	Leader	Votes	%	Seats	+/–	Status
1992 (Note: as Moderates (joint list with Rural Centre Party))	Marju Lauristin	44,577	9.73 (#4)	12 / 101	New	Coalition
1995	Eiki Nestor	32,381	5.99 (#5)	6 / 101	▼6	Opposition
1999 (Note: as Moderates (including People's Party candidates))	Andres Tarand	73,630	15.21 (#4)	17 / 101	▲11	Coalition (1999–2002)
1999	Andres Tarand	73,630	15.21 (#4)	17 / 101	▲11	Opposition (2002–2003)
2003 (Note: as Moderate People's Party)	Ivari Padar	34,837	7.04 (#6)	6 / 101	▼11	Opposition
2007	Ivari Padar	58,363	10.61 (#4)	10 / 101	▲4	Coalition (2007–2009)
2007	Ivari Padar	58,363	10.61 (#4)	10 / 101	▲4	Opposition (2009–2011)
2011	Sven Mikser	98,307	17.09 (#4)	19 / 101	▲9	Opposition (2011–2014)
2011	Sven Mikser	98,307	17.09 (#4)	19 / 101	▲9	Coalition (2014–2015)
2015	Sven Mikser	87,189	15.19 (#3)	15 / 101	▼4	Coalition
2019	Jevgeni Ossinovski	55,175	9.83 (#5)	10 / 101	▼5	Opposition (2019–2022)
2019	Jevgeni Ossinovski	55,175	9.83 (#5)	10 / 101	▼5	Coalition (2022–2023)
2023	Lauri Läänemets	56,584	9.27 (#5)	9 / 101	▼1	Coalition (2023–2025)
2023	Lauri Läänemets	56,584	9.27 (#5)	9 / 101	▼1	Opposition (2025-)

=== European Parliament elections ===
Election	List leader	Votes	%	Seats	+/–	EP Group
2004	Toomas Hendrik Ilves	85,433	36.8 (#1)	3 / 6	New	PES
2009	Ivari Padar	34,508	8.69 (#5)	1 / 6	▼2	S&D
2014	Marju Lauristin	44,550	13.56 (#4)	1 / 6	Steady	S&D
2019	Marina Kaljurand	77,375	23.30 (#2)	2 / 7	▲1	S&D
2024	Marina Kaljurand	71,171	19.33 (#2)	2 / 7	Steady	S&D

== Periods in government ==
The party was in government in the following periods: 1992–1994 (Mart Laar's first government), 1994–1995 (Andres Tarand's government, often called to Christmas Peace government [jõulurahu valitsus]), 1999–2002 (Mart Laar's second government, often called the Triple Alliance [kolmikliit]), and 2007–2009, some of which included participating in three centre-right governments with the Fatherland Union and Reform Party. The party returned to government in Kaja Kallas' second cabinet on 18 July 2022 in a coalition with Reform and Isamaa. The party was removed from Kristen Michal's cabinet on 10 March 2025.

== Symbols ==
logo of the Moderate People's Party

Party symbol until 2016

Party symbol since 2016

== See also ==
- Social Democratic Party
- Estonian Social Democratic Workers Party (historical)
