= Estonian Biodiversity Party =

Estonian political party

Estonian Biodiversity Party Elurikkuse Erakond
- Leader: Collective leadership
- Founded: 2 September 2018
- Dissolved: 20 August 2020
- Merged into: Estonian Party for the Future
- Headquarters: Vana-Roosa, Rõuge Parish
- Membership (2019): ▲536
- Ideology: Green politics Grassroots democracy Decentralization; E-democracy; Soft Euroscepticism
- Political position: Centre
- Colours: Yellow

Website
- elurikkuseerakond.ee

The Biodiversity Party (Estonian: Elurikkuse Erakond) was an Estonian green political party, which was founded in September 2018 and one of its leaders was the former Estonian Free Party chief Artur Talvik. They described themselves as post-ideological and their aim was to develop Estonia into a decentralized smart eco-digital country.

On 20 August 2020, the party merged with the Estonian Free Party to form the Estonian Party for the Future.

== Electoral results ==
=== Parliamentary elections ===
Election	Votes			Seats		Pos.	Government
Election	#	%	± pp	#	±	Pos.	Government
2019	6,858	1.2		0 / 101		8th	Extra-parliamentary

=== European Parliament elections ===
Election	Votes			Seats		Pos.
Election	#	%	± pp	#	±	Pos.
2019	3,012	0.9		0 / 6		9th
