= Estonian Free Party =

Estonian political party

Estonian Free Party Eesti Vabaerakond
- Leader: Heiki Lill
- Founded: 20 September 2014
- Dissolved: 20 August 2020
- Split from: Pro Patria and Res Publica Union
- Merged into: Estonian Party for the Future
- Headquarters: Koidu tn 23, Tallinn
- Membership (2019): ▼534
- Ideology: Conservatism; Conservative liberalism Populism
- Political position: Centre-right
- Colours: Blue

Website
- www.vabaerakond.ee

The Estonian Free Party (Estonian: Eesti Vabaerakond) was an Estonian centre-right political party founded in 2014. The last chairman of the party was Heiki Lill. The party gained 8 seats after passing the 5-percent threshold in the 2015 Estonian parliamentary elections.

The party received 6,461 votes in the 2019 Estonian parliamentary election and fell out of the parliament.

On 20 August 2020, the party merged with the Estonian Biodiversity Party to form the Estonian Party for the Future.

== History ==
The nonprofit Estonian Free Party Founding Group was founded in January 2014. Originally it was to be founded by two organizations, Free Patriotic Citizen (Estonian: Vaba Isamaaline Kodanik) and Better Estonia (Estonian: Parem Eesti), but the latter decided to withdraw.

Estonian Free Party was officially established on 20 September 2014, and Andres Herkel was elected as chairman. The party attracted numerous public figures, including former head of the Defense Forces Admiral Tarmo Kõuts, actor Ain Lutsepp, and Jüri Adams, a former government minister who was one of the main writers of the Constitution of Estonia.

During the 2015 Estonian parliamentary elections, the Estonian Free Party received 49,883 votes, constituting 8.7 percent of the total, which garnered it 8 seats in the 101-member parliament. The Estonian Free Party's candidate for prime minister, Artur Talvik, who received the most votes of all the Estonian Free Party candidates, was not a member of the party himself.

The Estonian Free Party participated in coalition talks together with the Estonian Reform Party, Social Democratic Party, and Pro Patria and Res Publica Union, but were left out of the coalition because their proposals to change the tax system were considered unacceptable. The Estonian Reform Party's unwillingness to reduce the state funding for political parties was cited as an issue by the Estonian Free Party.

== Political positions ==
Commentators have argued, that the Estonian Free Party lacks a clear ideology. It has been characterized as centre-right, while chairman Andres Herkel described the party's ideology as right-wing liberal.

The party advocates raising the personal income tax, while on the other hand also raising the non-taxable basic exemption to support the poorer majority of taxpayers. The party's program also includes increased taxes on alcohol, tobacco, and confectionery. In economic policy, the party supports a relatively liberal approach, especially to support small businesses. The party has advocated reduction of state funding of political parties.

The Estonian Free Party has declared its opposition to the law recognising same-sex unions in Estonia, claiming that in its current form the law does not solve any problems. The party claims that the law needs to be revised and possibly also split into multiple, separate laws. The party opposes compulsory EU-wide migrant quotas in regard to European migrant crisis, and insists that the number of refugees to be accepted needs to be determined through negotiations. In November 2018, the party voted against Estonia joining the UN Global Compact for Migration.

== Electoral results ==
=== Parliamentary elections ===
Election	Votes		Seats		Pos.	Government
Election	#	%	#	±	Pos.	Government
2015	49,882	8.7	8 / 101	▲8	5th	Opposition
2019	6,461	1.2	0 / 101	▼8	9th	Extra-parliamentary
