= Marina Kaljurand =

Estonian politician (born 1962)

Marina Kaljurand MEP
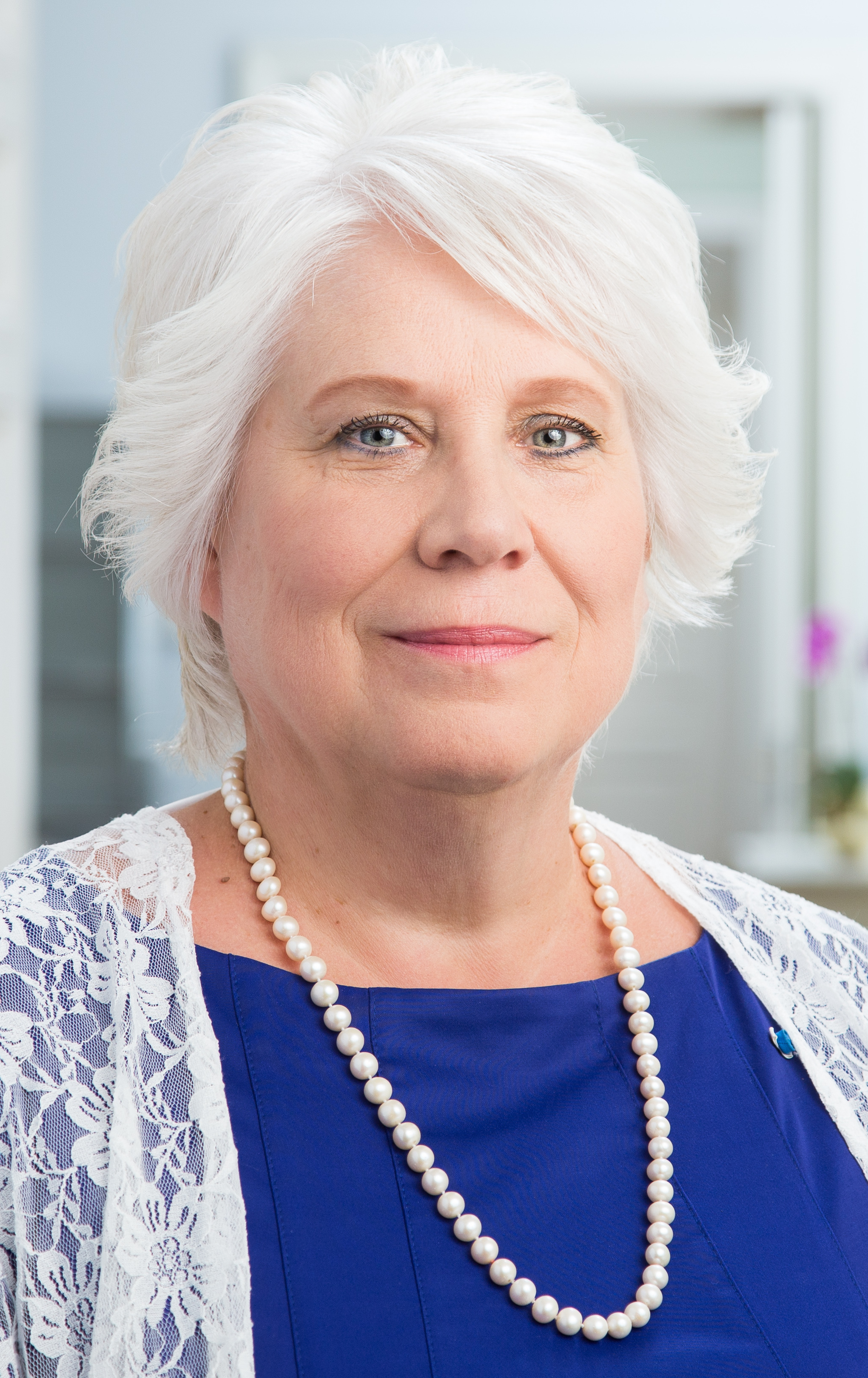
- Official portrait, 2015

Member of the European Parliament for Estonia
- Incumbent
- Assumed office 2 July 2019

28th Minister of Foreign Affairs
- In office 16 July 2015 – 12 September 2016
- Prime Minister: Taavi Rõivas
- Preceded by: Keit Pentus-Rosimannus
- Succeeded by: Jürgen Ligi

Ambassador of Estonia to the United States, Canada and Mexico
- In office 2011–2014
- President: Toomas Hendrik Ilves
- Preceded by: Väino Reinart
- Succeeded by: Eerik Marmei

Estonian Ambassador to Russia
- In office 2007–2011
- President: Toomas Hendrik Ilves
- Preceded by: Karin Jaani
- Succeeded by: Simmu Tiik

Estonian Ambassador to Israel
- In office 2004–2006
- President: Arnold Rüütel
- Preceded by: Jüri Seilenthal
- Succeeded by: Aino Lepik von Wiren

Personal details
- Born: Marina Rajevskaja; 6 September 1962 (age 64) Tallinn, then part of Estonian SSR, Soviet Union
- Party: Social Democratic Party (2018–present)
- Other political affiliations: Independent (before 2018)
- Education: University of Tartu; Estonian School of Diplomacy; Tufts University

Marina Kaljurand (née Rajevskaja; born 6 September 1962) is an Estonian politician and Member of the European Parliament. Kaljurand served as Minister of Foreign Affairs in Taavi Rõivas' second cabinet as an independent. Earlier, she served as the Ambassador of Estonia to the United States, Russia, Mexico, Canada, Kazakhstan, and Israel.

== Early life and education ==
Born in Tallinn, Kaljurand is of Latvian and Russian descent through her father and mother, respectively. Her father was bus driver Imants Uits from Saldus, Latvia and her mother was Veera Rajevskaja (1925–2024) a former Estonian SSR Council of Ministers employee from Narva. She identifies herself as ethnically Russian. After obtaining her high school diploma in Tallinn, she graduated in 1986 from the University of Tartu, where she earned a master's degree in law (cum laude). She has also graduated from the Estonian School of Diplomacy and has acquired a master's degree in international law and diplomacy from Tufts University's Fletcher School of Law and Diplomacy (F95) on a Fulbright Scholarship in the United States.

== Career ==
Kaljurand formerly worked as the Undersecretary for Legal and Consular Affairs, Undersecretary for Political Affairs, Undersecretary for Foreign Economic Relations and Development Aid at the Foreign Affairs Ministry.

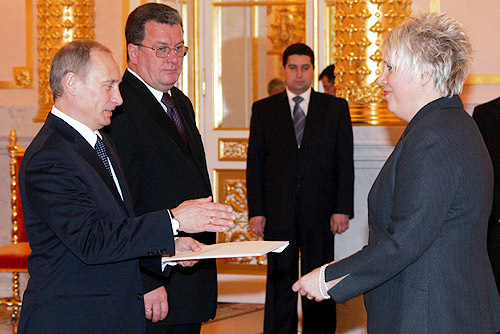
Ambassador Kaljurand with President Vladimir Putin of Russia (in Moscow, 2006)

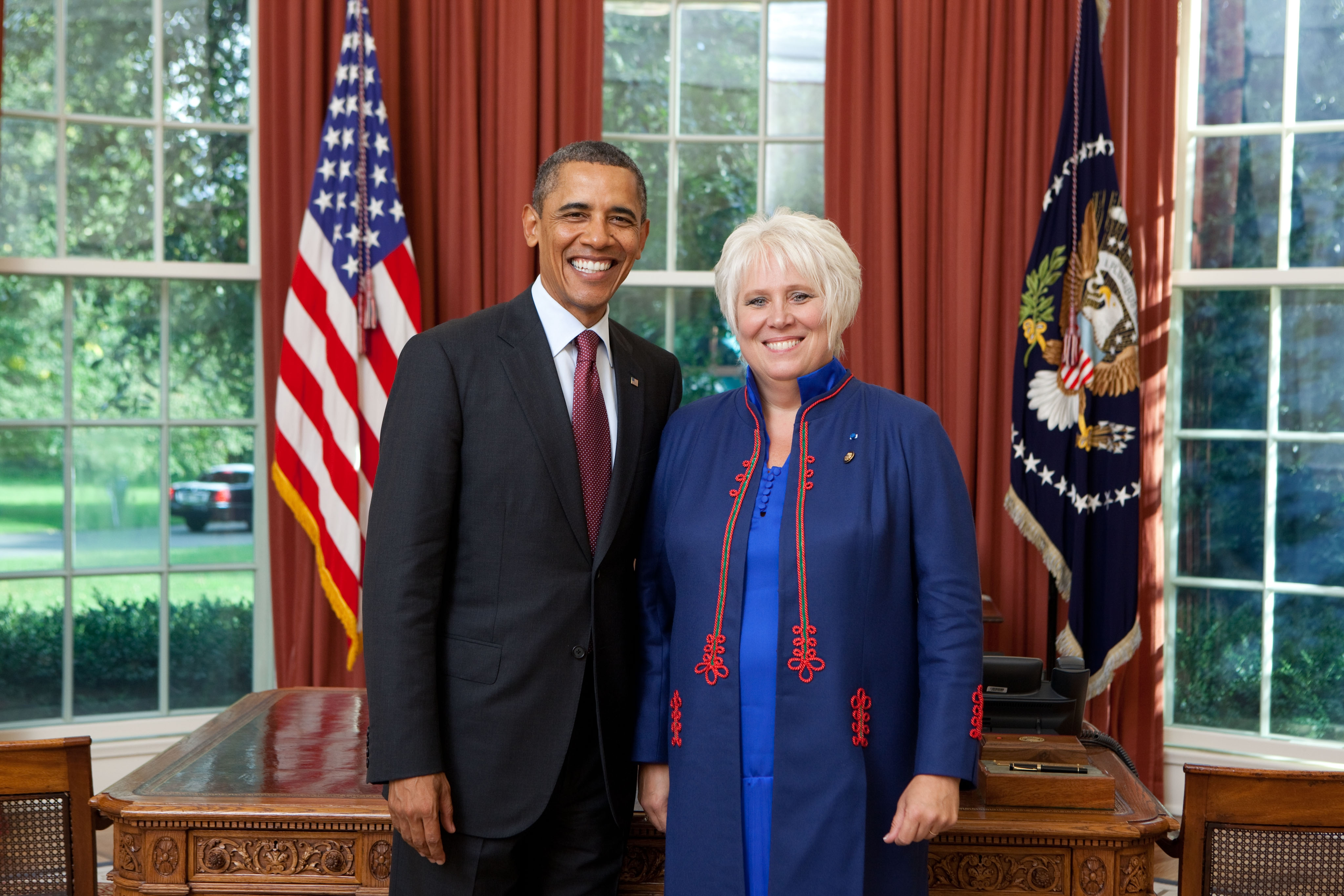
Ambassador Kaljurand with President Barack Obama in the Oval Office (Washington DC, 2011)

Kaljurand was the Ambassador of Estonia to Israel in 2004–2006, to the Russian Federation in 2005–2008, to Kazakhstan in 2007–2011, to Canada in 2011–2013, and to the United States and Mexico in 2011–2014.

=== Minister of Foreign Affairs ===
In July 2015, the Reform Party nominated Kaljurand as the new Minister of Foreign Affairs after Keit Pentus-Rosimannus had resigned. Her tenure began on 16 July 2015. She has frequently emphasized the importance of an efficient Common Foreign and Security Policy (CFSP) as well as a European Security and Defence Policy (ESDP).

=== Relations with Russia ===
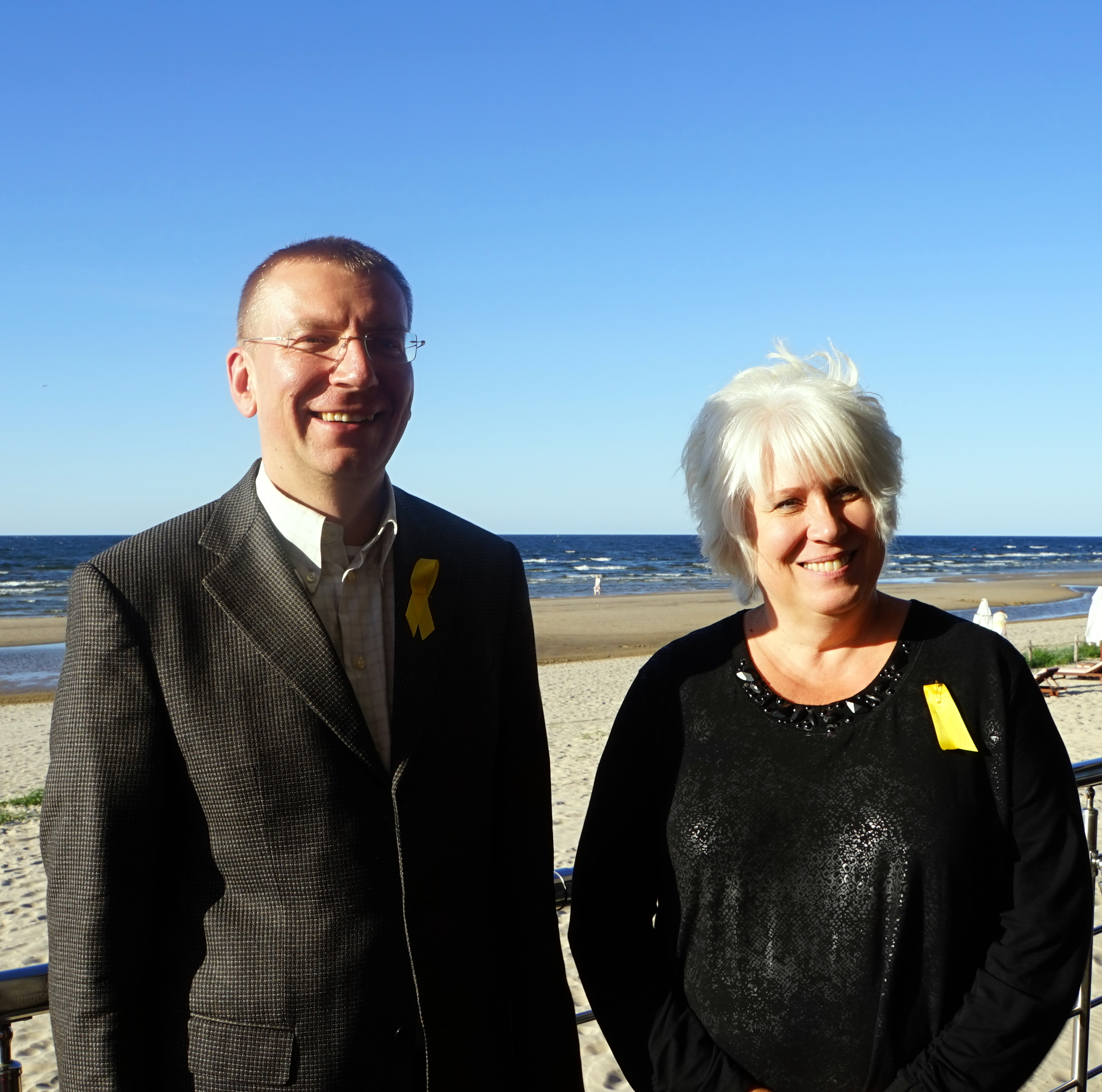
Estonian and Latvian Foreign Minister wearing yellow ribbons in support of Eston Kohver

==== Incidents near border ====
One of the leading Estonian television broadcasts "Pealtnägija" reported that in 2015 alone, "Russian military aircraft have flown with turned off transponders 266 times near Estonian borders." Marina Kaljurand then made a statement to the press saying Russia has given no explanations on these incidents. Each of the 266 incidents have caused NATO fighter jets to scramble from Ämari to intercept and identify the aircraft with switched off transponders. Kaljurand said this is a very serious problem and Estonia has repeatedly demanded answers from Russia. "Every meeting I have had with the Russian ambassador we have talked about aircraft with switched off transponders being dangerous, they are a threat to all air traffic over the Baltic Sea," she said. Having their transponders switched off turns the aircraft invisible to most radars used by civil air traffic control. Kaljurand said the ambassador always replies that he will inform Moscow. "He is yet to give a thorough, rational, logical answer," she added.

==== Soviet reparations question ====
Justice Minister and former Defence Minister Urmas Reinsalu (IRL) signed a memorandum with the other two Baltic justice ministers on cooperation to submit reparation demands to Russia. Kaljurand then responded that «The foreign ministry and Estonian government are not intending to take actual practical steps regarding that.»

==== Border treaty ====
As Foreign Minister, Kaljurand has continued the work of former ministers to sign a border treaty between Estonia and Russia. The government's bill includes two treaties and a separate agreement on the delimitation of maritime areas near Narva and the Gulf of Finland. The ratification of the bill, which would establish the state border between Estonia and Russia, requires a two-thirds majority in Parliament.

== Presidential election in 2016 ==
Ahead of the presidential election in 2016, many polls indicated strong support for Kaljurand, even though she had not announced her candidacy. For example, according to a poll by TNS Emor in December 2015, 20.3 percent of the respondents wanted to see her as president, with Edgar Savisaar (12.6 percent) in second, followed by Siim Kallas (10.6 percent) and Indrek Tarand (9.5 percent). Kaljurand was the most popular candidate among polled Estonians across all genders, ages, levels of education and income brackets, except for those making 300 or less euros per month.

Eventually Kaljurand announced her interest in running, but as the Reform Party had multiple candidates to choose from, Kaljurand suggested that the party would support her in the electoral college while supporting former Prime Minister Siim Kallas in the election in parliament, in case the parliament was unable to make a decision. However, the Reform Party decided to support Kallas both in the parliament and in the electoral college. After the decision was made by the party, Kaljurand announced that she would step down from her position as Minister of Foreign Affairs and would run for presidency without the support of the Reform Party.

Despite the Reform Party choosing to support former Prime Minister Siim Kallas, in a survey conducted by TNS Emor for daily Postimees at the beginning of September 2016, 40% of Estonians said they wanted to see Marina Kaljurand become president, while only 18% supported the Reform Party’s official candidate, Siim Kallas.

In the election, Kaljurand placed fourth with 75 votes and did not advance to the second round of voting. However, as the electoral college could not make a decision between Kallas and Allar Jõks, the election returned to the parliament for another round and the nomination procedure started over. After hearing the results, Kaljurand announced that she would not run again. After multiple unsuccessful rounds of voting, parliamentary groups decided to propose unaffiliated Kersti Kaljulaid to the position and she was elected unopposed on 30 September 2016.

After the election, Kaljurand returned to the Ministry of Foreign Affairs as an adviser on cyber security-related matters.

== Member of European Parliament ==
In June 2018, Kalurand announced that she had joined the Social Democratic Party and would take part in elections for Riigikogu and European Parliament in 2019.

Kaljurand was elected as a Member of the European Parliament in 2019. She has since been serving on the Committee on Civil Liberties, Justice and Home Affairs. In addition to her committee assignments, she is part of the Parliament’s delegation to the EU-Armenia Parliamentary Partnership Committee, the EU-Azerbaijan Parliamentary Cooperation Committee and the EU-Georgia Parliamentary Association Committee as well as of the delegation to the Euronest Parliamentary Assembly. She is also a member of the European Parliament Intergroup on LGBT Rights.

== Personal life ==
Kaljurand speaks three languages: Estonian, Russian and English. She is married to Kalle Kaljurand and they have two children – daughter Kaisa (born 1987) and son Kristjan (born 1992). Her hobbies are reading, taking long walks with her two dogs and badminton. She is a multiple Estonian national champion in badminton (1980–1991). She is also a member of the Estonian Scottish Terrier Association.

== Topics of interest ==
=== Gender equality ===
Marina Kaljurand has been a vocal supporter of women's rights. At the Achieving Gender Equality conference in Tbilisi she said "The political agreements and legal frameworks are in place – now the countries need to start implementing them more efficiently. Everyone benefits from a larger proportion of women in politics and the economy – equal participation will revitalize the economy and increase overall satisfaction."

During her speech at the Sustainable Summit in New York City (2015), Kaljurand pointed out her main concerns on gender equality. "I would like to use my short minutes to touch upon one of the most important root causes of inequality related to gender aspects – lack of education and shortcomings in sexual and reproductive health and rights. It is a complex matter that cannot be fixed with one magic solution. The Beijing Platform of Action and related national and international norms will not fulfill their goals unless we stop the prevalence of stereotypical attitudes, social norms and practices that support and reproduce discrimination and violence against women. All people have the right to have control and decide freely and responsibly on matters related to their sexuality, free of coercion, discrimination and violence – as a matter of social justice. Sexual and reproductive rights are about bodily integrity, equality and freedom of choice. We cannot look away from the fact that these rights are violated every day, in all our countries."

=== Cybersecurity ===
The e-GovernanceAcademy presented the National Cyber Security Index (NCSI) at the Tallinn e-Governance Conference on 31 May 2016. According to Kaljurand, cyber security has become a security guarantee for countries in the 21st century. "In the interests of international and national cyber security, we have to use every opportunity to increase the cyber security capacities of countries," said Kaljurand at the introduction of the index. "It is in the interests of both governments and the public. The index is yet another contribution made by Estonia to increasing security in cyber space."

In 2016 at the Conference on State Practice and the Future of International Law in Cyberspace Kaljurand talked about developing Estonian views on international law as it applies to State behavior in cyberspace. "As a lawyer and as a diplomat I appreciate the interplay of law and politics in the international cyber security dialogue. I have personal experience of complicated diplomatic efforts to mitigate cyber-attacks against my country. It is essential to acknowledge that we perceive cyber threats and opportunities differently. Regardless of how clearly we can see and understand each other’s perspectives, it is essential that we remain mindful to each other’s views. This open and permissive attitude allows us to achieve stability and security, while taking full advantage of technological development and advances."

In October 2016, Kaljurand started working as an adviser on security-related questions at the Ministry of Foreign Affairs. "Beginning on Oct. 24, I will begin part-time work as an adviser on security-related questions at the Ministry of Foreign Affairs," continued the former foreign minister. "This means that I will remain a representative of Estonia in the UN's Group of Governmental Experts on Cybersecurity; I have taken part in this work group since 2014, irrespective of [my] positions."

At the end of 2016, Kaljurand was appointed chair of the Global Commission on the Stability of Cyberspace, a commission which ran for three years, 2017–2019. She stepped down as chair upon taking up her post in the European Parliament in 2019, near the end of the Commission's tenure. Under her leadership, the Commission produced its landmark Norm to Protect the Public Core of the Internet, which built upon earlier work by the 2013 and 2015 United Nations Groups of Governmental Experts.

=== Foreign Policy ===
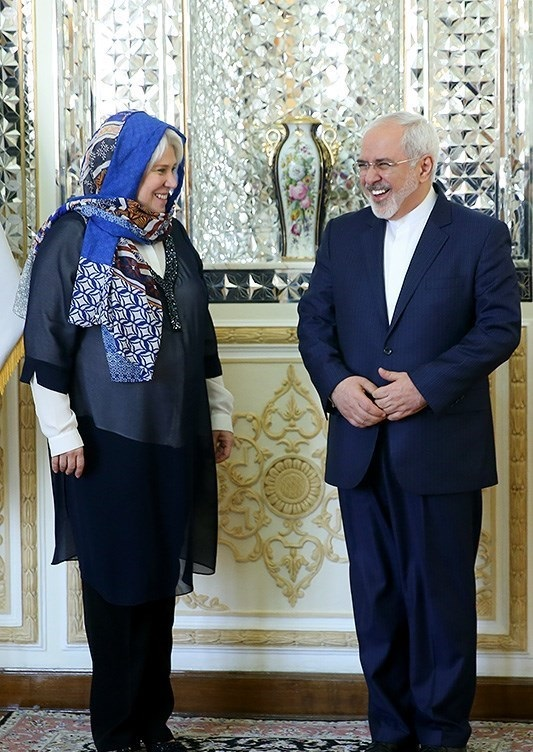
Kaljurand meeting Iranian foreign minister Mohammad Javad Zarif, 12 April 2016

"What has been most important in Estonia is regaining its position globally," Kaljurand said, later calling Estonia the "most integrated state in Northern Europe" in terms of its involvement in international organizations. According to Kaljurand, this integration stems especially from Estonia’s membership in the European Union and NATO. Estonia is also becoming more involved on the global stage by running to become a nonpermanent member of the United Nations Security Council from 2020 to 2021."

She is also and avid supporter of NATO frequently pointing out the importance of it in her speeches. "The political unity of our NATO allies and a common understanding of the risks and requirements the alliance faces has been and is very important for Estonia. We are pleased that in 2015 the security of Estonia was visibly strengthened with the support of our allies – they shared our assessment of threats and understood us. As is stated in the National Security Concept of Estonia, NATO, with its transatlantic nature and the principle of collective defence, serves as the cornerstone of European, and therefore also Estonian, national security and defence." "With all due respect to those who claim that NATO is "warmongering" or "provoking Russia" with our exercises, this is the reality: NATO drills prepare for the defense of our territory, our allies and our people in case of attack. Russia’s drills are offensive, simulating the invasion of its neighbors, the destruction and seizure of critical military and economic infrastructure, and targeted nuclear strikes on NATO allies and partners."

=== Integration ===
Coming from a bilingual upbringing Kaljurand has emphasized the importance of respecting the culture and language of the country you are living in. She has often spoken about the matter at Russian-Estonian schools.

== Professional involvement ==
- Chair of the Global Commission on the Stability of Cyberspace, March 2017– current
- Member of the CSIS High-Level Advisory Council to the Lillan and Robert D. Stuart Jr Center in Euro-Atlantic and Northern European Studies, January 2017– current
- Member of the Advisory Council of Global and International Studies at University of Salamanca, January 2017– current
- Estonian Cyber Security Expert at the UN Group of Governmental Experts on Cyber Security, 2014–2015, September 2016 – current
- Chief Negotiator on Accession of Estonia to the OECD, 2008– 2011
- Member of the Governmental Delegation in accession negotiations to the European Union, Head of the Legal Working Group of the Accession Treaty, 2002–2004
- Member of the Governmental Delegation- negotiations on Land and Maritime Boundaries Agreements between Estonia and Russian Federation, 1995–2005
- Legal expert of the Governmental Delegation- Agreement on Troops Withdrawal between Estonia and Russian Federation, 1992–1994
- Founding member of the Estonian Branch of the International Law Association, since 1996
- Founding member of WIIS-EST – Estonian Branch of Women in International Security, since 2000
- Member of the Board of Trustees of Tallinn University, since 2010

== Decorations ==
=== Decorated by the President of Estonia ===
- Order of the National Coat of Arms, III class (2008)
- Order of White Star, III class (2004)

=== Other ===
- Commander Grand Cross of the Order of the Lion of Finland (2016)
- Estonian Association of Business and Professional Women Woman of the Year (2015)
- "Postimees" Person of the Year (2007)

Diplomatic posts
Preceded by Jüri Seilenthal	Estonian Ambassador to Israel; 2004–2006	Succeeded by Aino Lepik von Wiren
Preceded by Karin Jaani	Estonian Ambassador to Russia; 2006–2008	Succeeded by Simmu Tiik
Preceded by Väino Reinart	Estonian Ambassador to the United States and Mexico; 2011–2014	Succeeded by Eerik Marmei
Political offices
Preceded by Keit Pentus-Rosimannus	Minister of Foreign Affairs; 2015–2016	Succeeded by Jürgen Ligi
