= Jonatan Vseviov =

Estonian diplomat (born 1981)

- Vseviov in 2025

Secretary General of the Ministry of Foreign Affairs
- In office 8 February 2021 – 1 November 2026
- Prime Minister: Kaja Kallas; Kristen Michal
- Preceded by: Rainer Saks

Ambassador of Estonia to the United States and Mexico
- In office 2018–2021
- Prime Minister: Jüri Ratas; Kaja Kallas
- Preceded by: Lauri Lepik
- Succeeded by: Kristjan Prikk

Secretary General of the Ministry of Defence
- In office 1 January 2016 – 16 August 2018
- Prime Minister: Taavi Rõivas; Jüri Ratas
- Preceded by: Mikk Marran
- Succeeded by: Kristjan Prikk

Personal details
- Born: 14 August 1981 (age 45) Tallinn, Estonia
- Party: SDE (2026-present)
- Other political affiliations: Reform (1999-2005)
- Parent: David Vseviov
- Education: University of Tartu; Georgetown University

Jonatan Vseviov (born 14 August 1981) is an Estonian diplomat and politician who is the Prime Ministerial candidate for the Social Democrats in the 2027 parliamentary election. He served as the Secretary General of the Estonian Ministry of Foreign Affairs from 2021 to 2026.

== Career ==
He was a member of the Estonian Reform Party from 1999 to 2005.

From 2013 to 2014, he served as a diplomat representing the Ministry of Defence at the Estonian Embassy in Washington.

He served as the Secretary General of the Estonian Ministry of Defence from 2016 to 2018. During his tenure, Vseviov participated in the development and implementation of NATO’s defense activities related to the Baltic region, including the deployment of pre-positioned Allied units to the Baltic states.

From 2018 to 2021, he was Ambassador of Estonia to the United States.

Vseviov served as the Secretary General of the Estonian Ministry of Foreign Affairs from 2021.

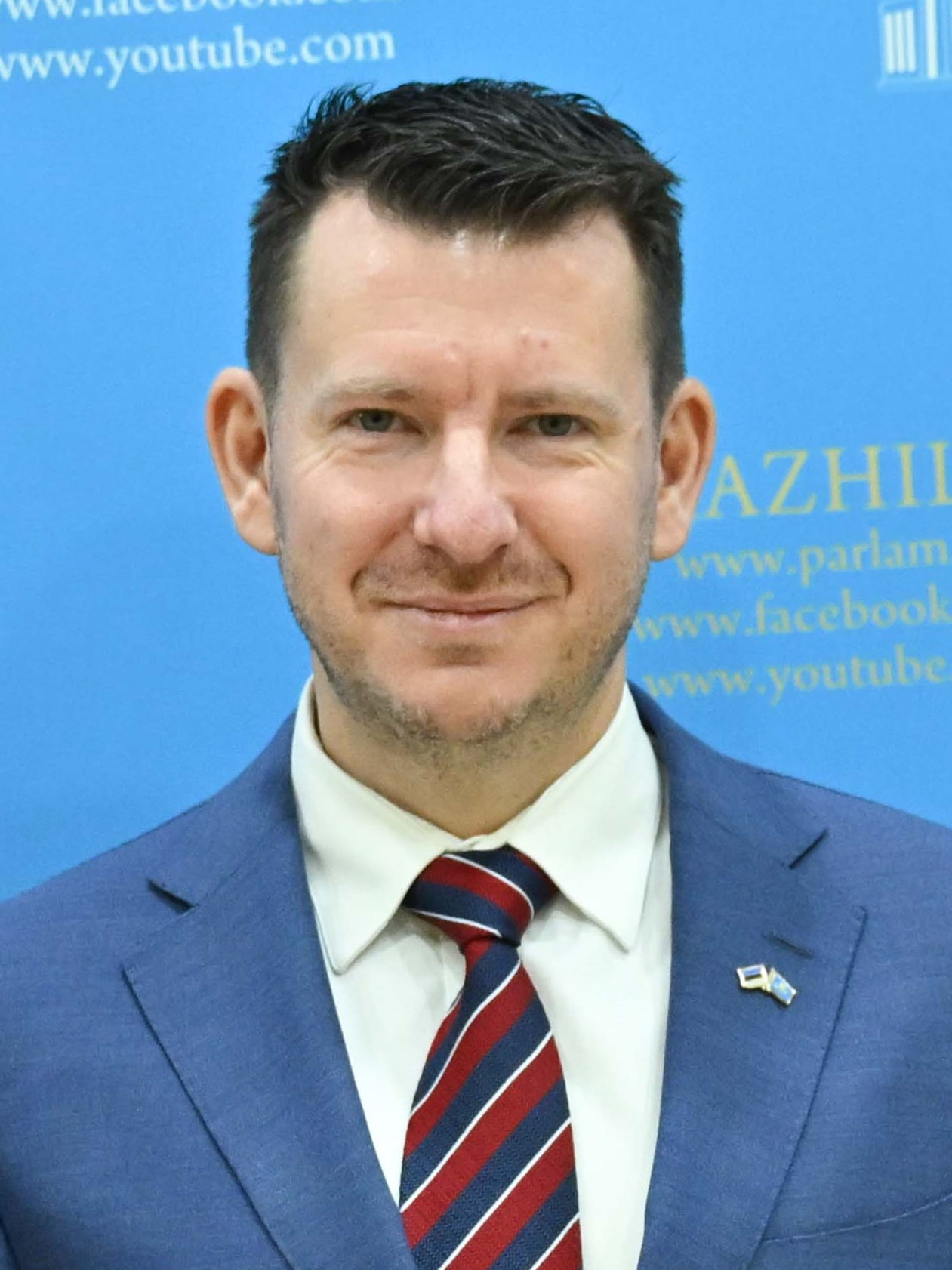
Jonatan Vseviov in 2023

During the 2026 Estonian presidential election, he was speculated and polled as a potential candidate for the presidency.

On October 22, 2026 he announced that he will run as the Prime Ministerial candidate for the Social Democratic Party in the 2027 elections.

== Awards ==
- 2018: Order of the White Star, III class.

== Personal life ==
He is married and he has two children. His father is historian David Vseviov. Vseviov is of Jewish heritage.

He has a degree in political science from the University of Tartu and a master's degree with honors in security studies from Georgetown University.
