= Laird Hindle =

Canadian diplomat

Ambassador of Canada to Estonia
- Incumbent
- Assumed office 2023
- Preceded by: Kevin Rex

Ambassador of Canada to Kenya

Ambassador of Canada to Japan

Personal details
- Born: St. Vital, Manitoba
- Education: University of Manitoba (BA Hons Political Studies '97)

Laird Garfield Hindle is a Canadian diplomat who currently serves as ambassador to Estonia serving at the Canadian embassy in Riga, with Estonian President Alar Karis receiving Hindle's credentials on March 3, 2023.

== Education ==
Hindle graduated from Jeanne-Sauvé Secondary and with a Bachelor of Honors in Political Studies from the University of Manitoba in 1997.

== Career ==
Laird began in 1999 serving as deputy director in the development policy and institutions division and the international assistance policy co-ordination division and the Eastern and Southern Africa division in the Department of Foreign Affairs, Trade and Development (Global Affairs Canada). Laird has served in the embassy of Nairobi, Kenya, and the embassy in Tokyo, Japan.
