= Eerik Marmei =

Estonian diplomat (born 1970)

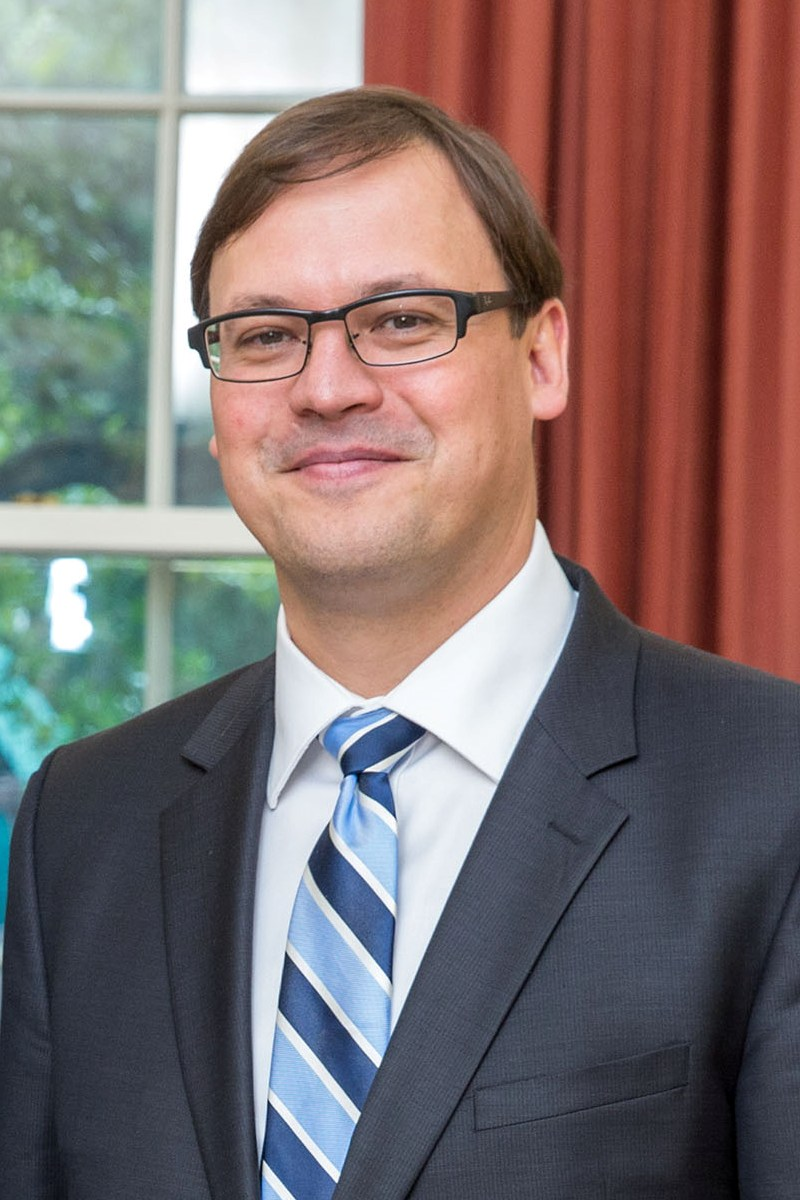
- Marmei in 2014

Ambassador of Estonia to Poland
- In office 2013–2014
- President: Kersti Kaljulaid
- Prime Minister: Jüri Ratas
- Preceded by: Jaak Lensment
- Succeeded by: Mait Martinson

Ambassador of Estonia to the United States
- In office 2014–2017
- President: Toomas Hendrik Ilves; Kersti Kaljulaid
- Prime Minister: Taavi Rõivas; Jüri Ratas
- Preceded by: Marina Kaljurand
- Succeeded by: Lauri Lepik

Personal details
- Born: Eerik Marmei; 6 May 1970 (age 56) Tartu, then part of Estonian SSR, Soviet Union
- Education: University of Tartu; Notre Dame University
- Occupation: Diplomat

Eerik Marmei (born 6 May 1970) is an Estonian diplomat.

In 1993, he graduated from the University of Tartu. In 1996, he finished his master studies at Notre Dame University in international relations.

Since 1993, he has worked for Ministry of Foreign Affairs.

From 2013 to 2014, he was Ambassador of Estonia to Poland and Romania. From 2014 to 2017, he was Ambassador of Estonia to the United States.
