= Canada–Estonia relations =

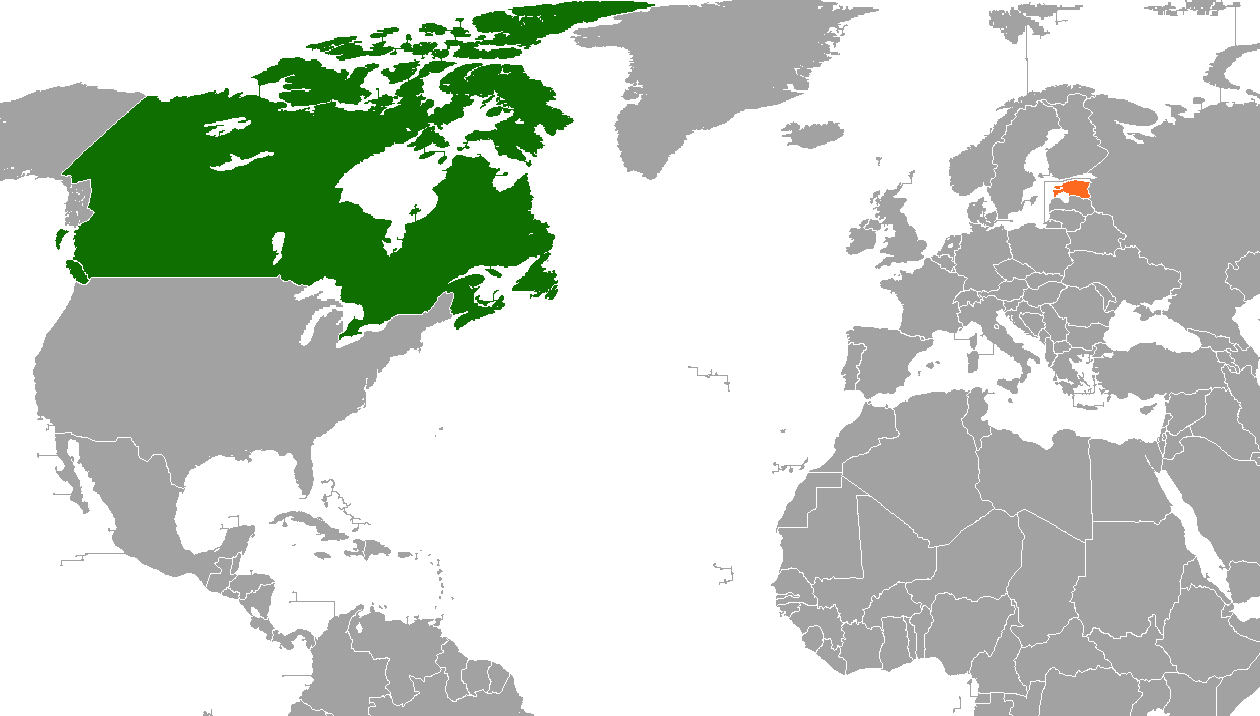

- Canada: Estonia

Canada–Estonia relations are foreign relations between Canada and Estonia. Canada recognised Estonia in 1922 and re-recognised Estonia on August 26, 1991. Canada is represented in Estonia through its embassy in Riga (Latvia) and an honorary consulate in Tallinn. Estonia has an embassy in Ottawa and four honorary consulates (in Montreal, Vancouver, and two in Toronto). There are around 22,000 Canadians of Estonian descent. The two countries are part of the NATO military alliance.

== History ==
Relations between the two countries began in 1922, when Canada recognized the Republic of Estonia.

Although Canada recognised that Estonia had de facto become part of the Soviet Union, it did not recognise the legality of the annexation of Estonia by the Soviet Union (de jure). On August 26, 1991, in the wake of the dissolution of the Soviet Union, Canada recognized the independence of Estonia.

In 2018 Canadian prime minister Justin Trudeau welcomed Estonian prime minister Jüri Ratas to Ottawa, where the two agreed to "broaden cooperation" on "digital government and the digital economy; defence and security; and trade". During the 2023 Vilnius summit, Trudeau and Estonian prime minister Kaja Kallas held a bilateral meeting in which Kallas thanked Trudeau for doubling its military presence in Latvia, which would "help strengthen the security of the entire Baltic Sea region". Kallas also noted that a Canadian company was building a magnet factory in Narva, which would bring additional jobs to the city. In October 2023, the Canadian and Estonian ministers of foreign affairs met in Ottawa, where they discussed how to manage Russian assets frozen in the aftermath of the Russian invasion of Ukraine, as well as potential cooperation in the fields of cybersecurity and countering disinformation.

On 22 September 2022, Governor General Mary Simon received Estonian Ambassador Margus Rava's credentials. On March 3, 2023, Estonian President Alar Karis received Ambassador Laird Garfield Hindle's credentials.

== List of Canadian ambassadors to Estonia ==
Embassy of Canada in Riga
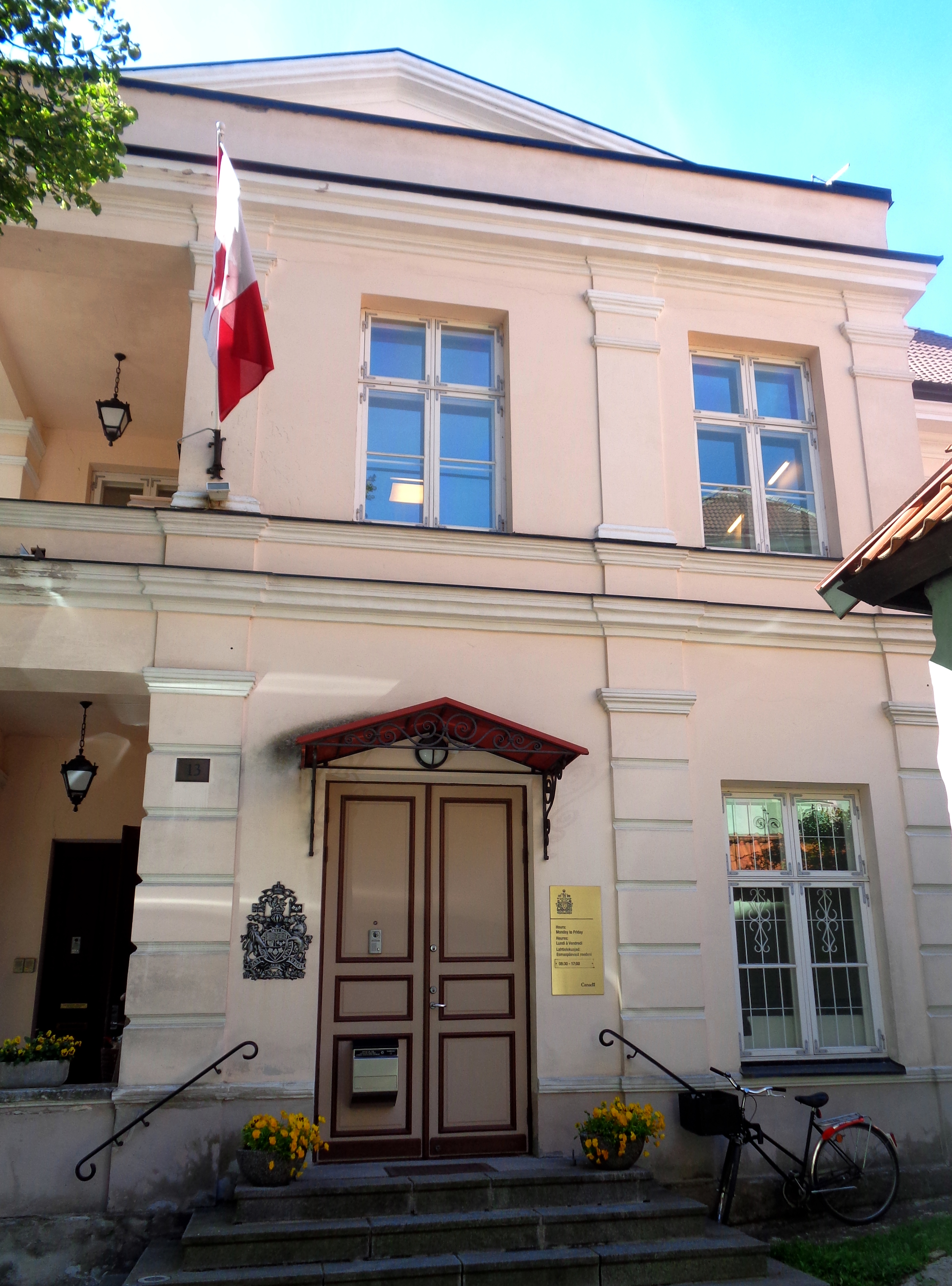
- The Canadian embassy in Riga
- Location: Tallinn
- Address: Toom-Kooli, 10130
- Ambassador: Laird Hindle

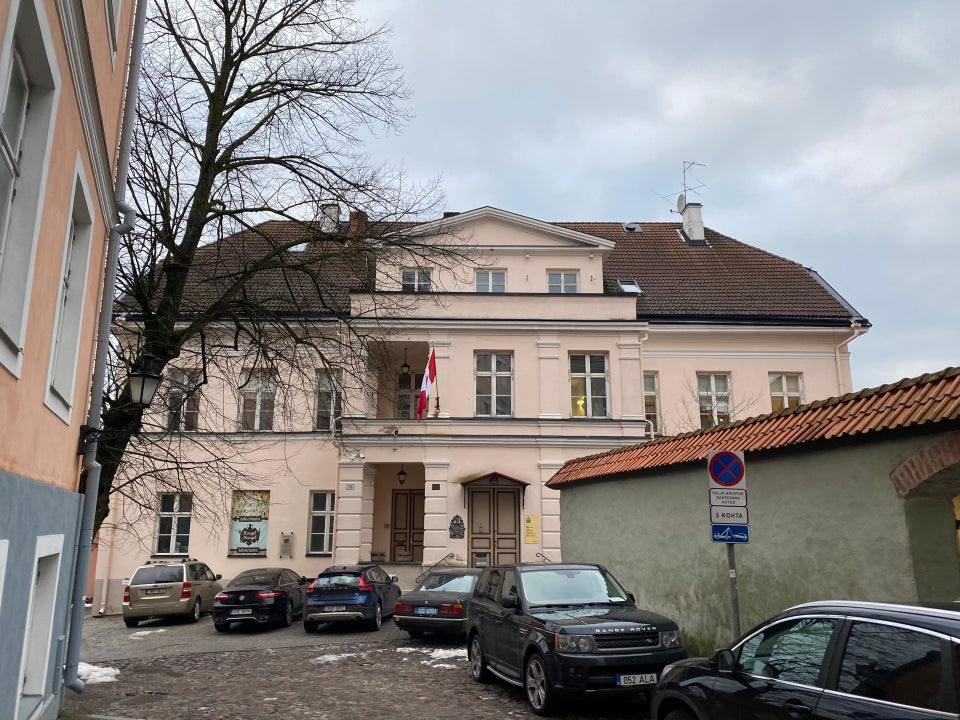
Canadian honorary consulate in Tallinn

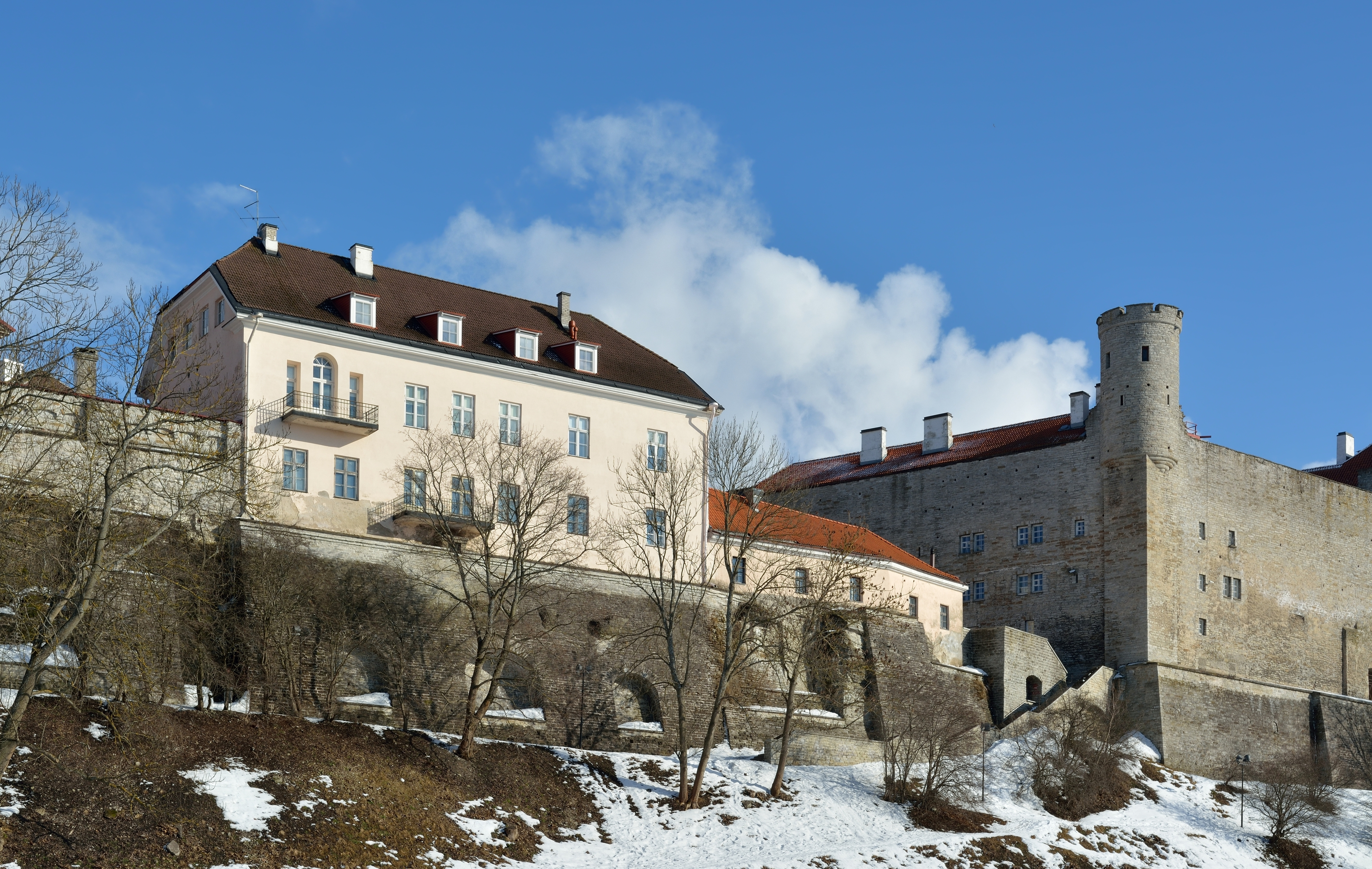
The Canadian honorary consulate in Tallinn from the rear in 2013

- Laird Hindle (2023–present)
- Kevin Rex (2018–2022)
- Alain Hausser (2015–2018)
- John Morrison (2012–2014)
- Scott Heatherington (2009–2012)
- Claire A. Poulin (2006–2008)
- Robert Andrigo (2002–2005)
- Peter P.L. McKellar (1999–2002)
- William L. Clarke (1995–1999)
- Michael Burke Phillips (1993–1995)
- Mary Vandenhoff (1991–1992)

== List of Estonian ambassadors to Canada ==
Embassy of Estonia in Ottawa
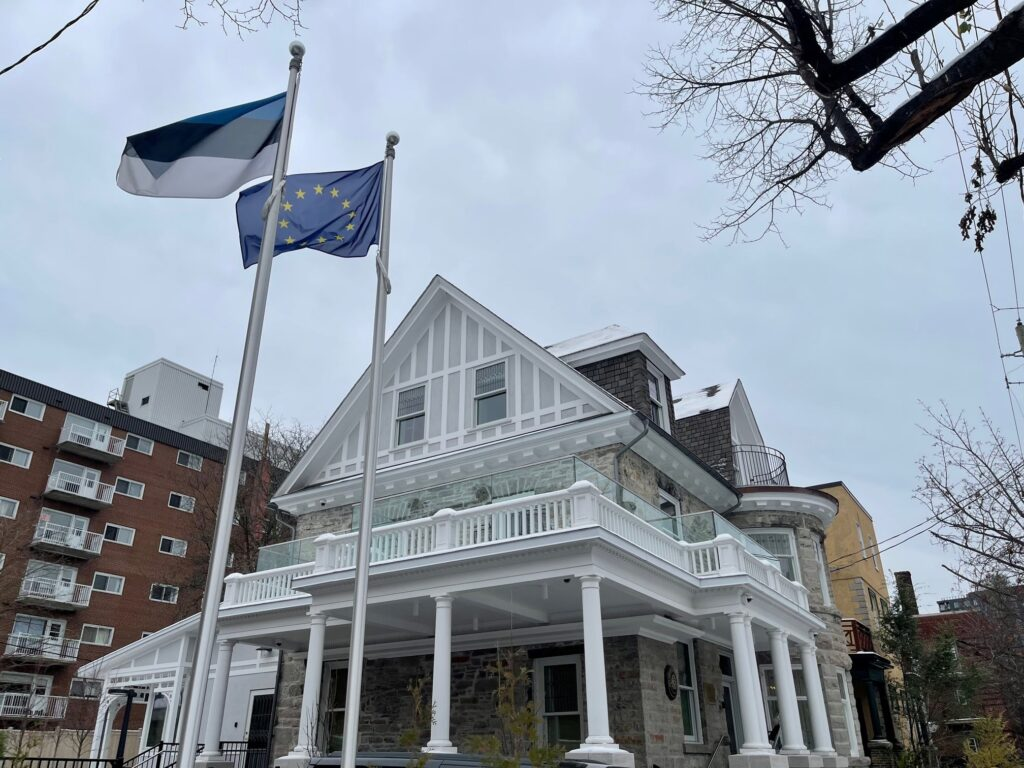
- The Estonian embassy in Ottawa
- Location: Ottawa
- Address: 168 Daly Ave. K1N 6E9
- Ambassador: Margus Rava

- Margus Rava (2022–present)
- Toomas Lukk (2018–2022)
- Gita Kalmet (2013–2018)
- Marina Kaljurand (2011–2013)
- Väino Reinart (2008–2011)
- Jüri Luik (2003–2008)
- Sven Jürgenson (2000–2003)
- G.K. Stoicescu (1997–2000)
- Toomas Hendrik Ilves (1994–1997)

== See also ==
- Foreign relations of Canada
- Foreign relations of Estonia
- Canada-EU relations
- NATO-EU relations
- Estonian Canadians
