= Next Estonian parliamentary election =

- By 7 March 2027

All 101 seats in the Riigikogu 51 seats needed for a majority
- Opinion polls
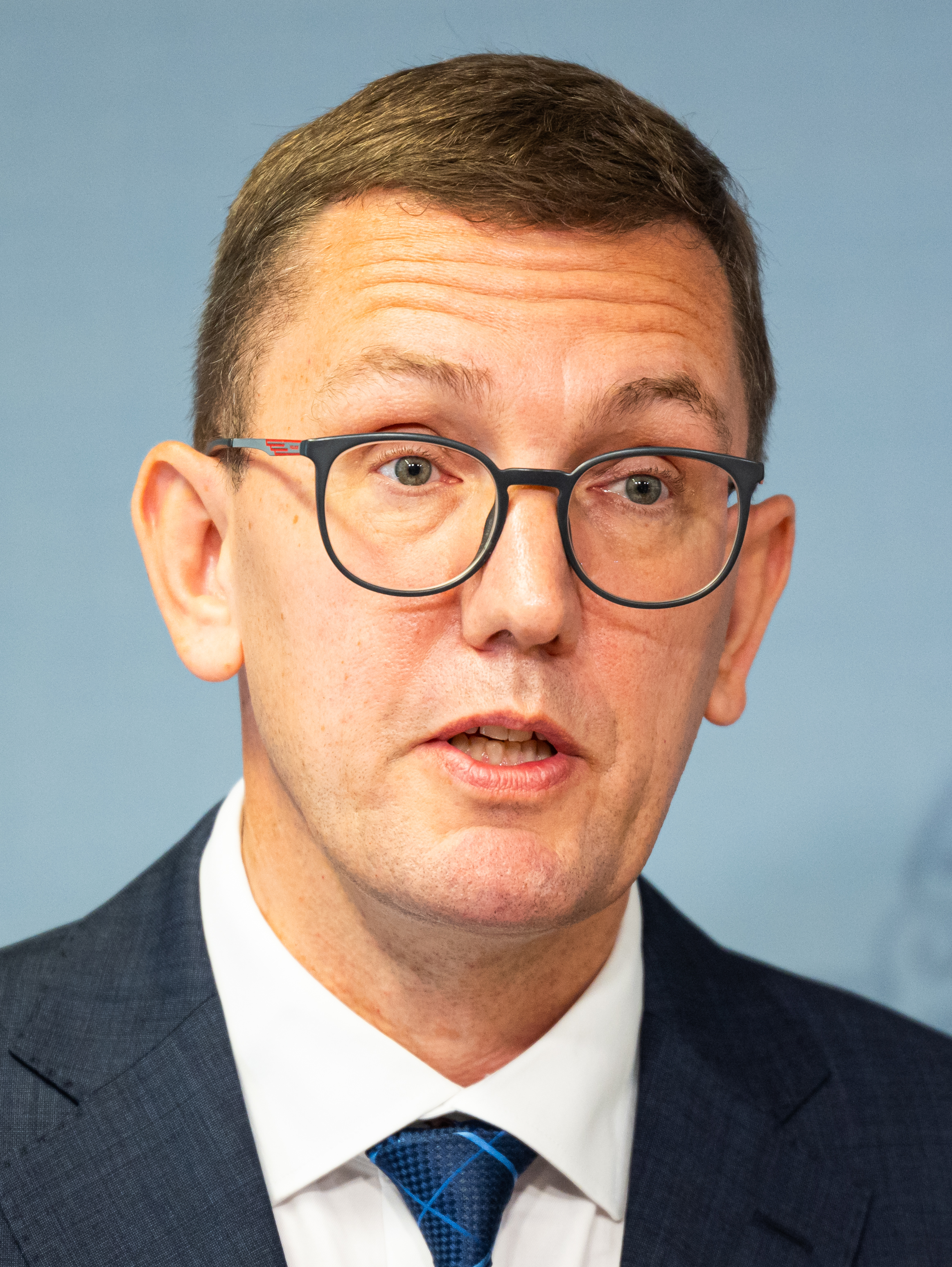

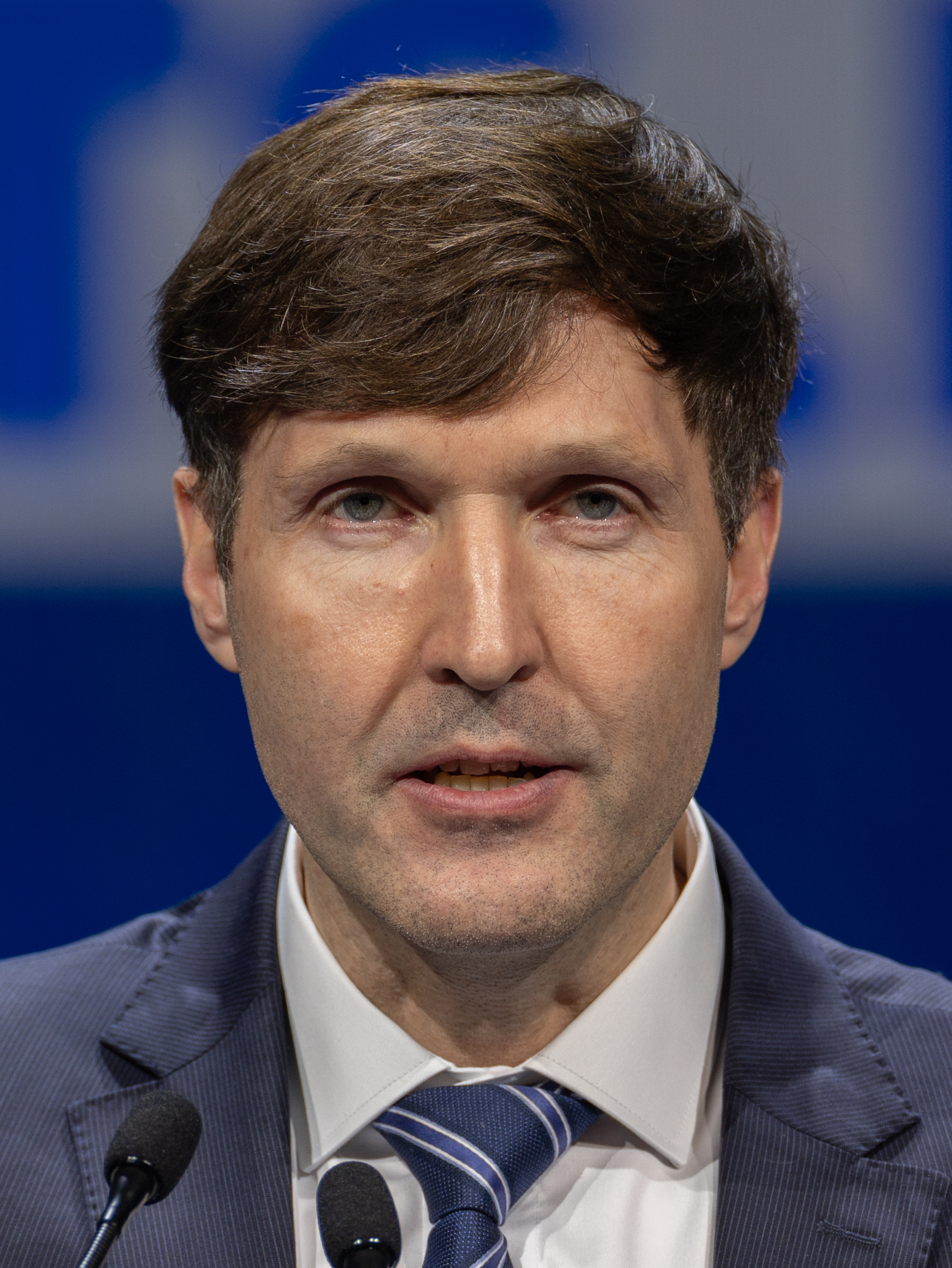

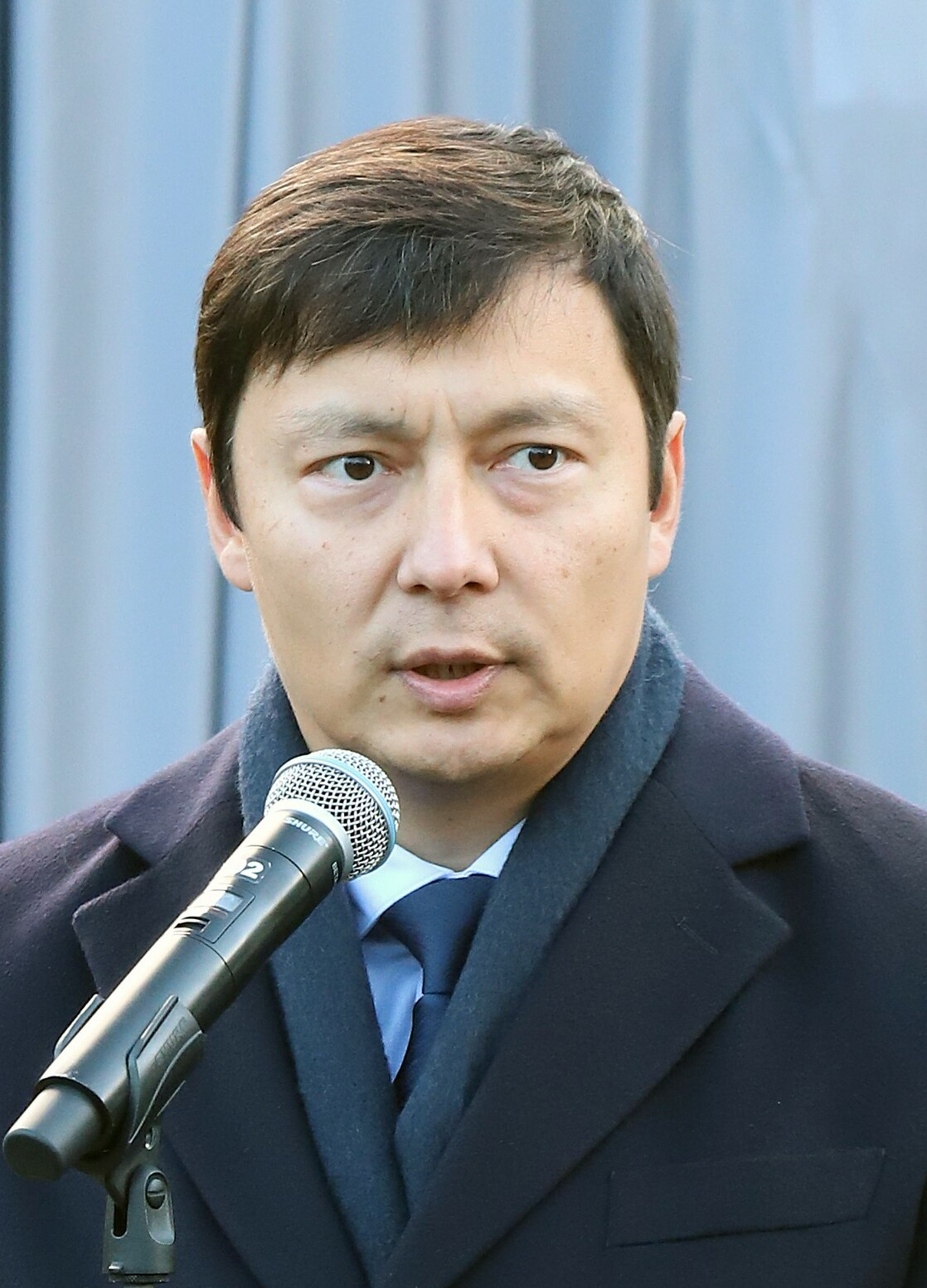

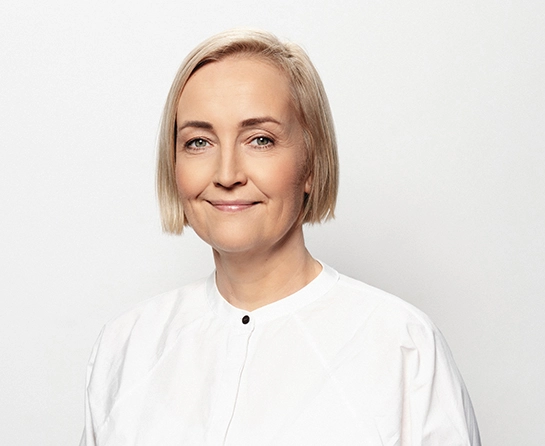

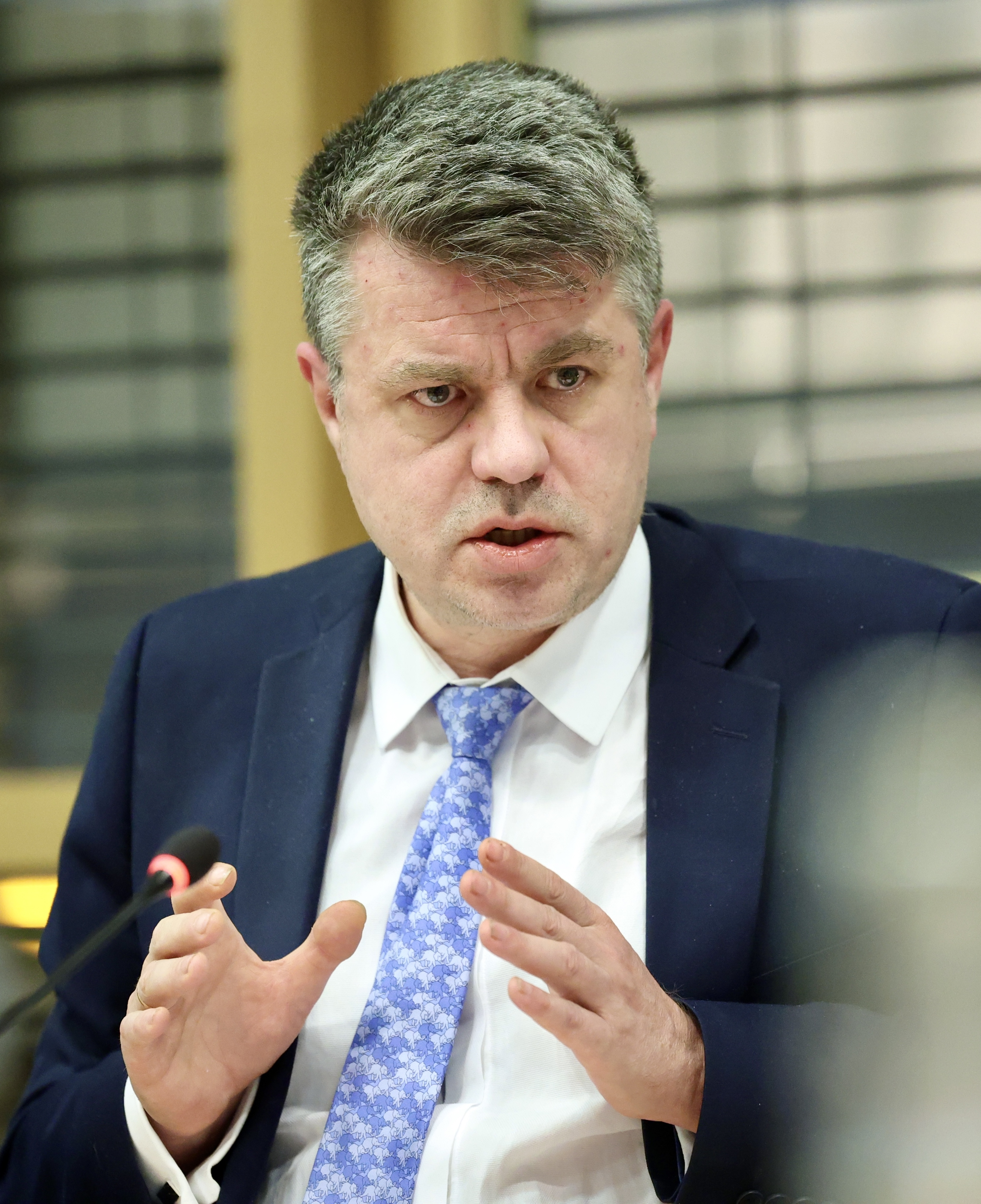
Leader	Kristen Michal	Martin Helme	Mihhail Kõlvart
Party	Reform	EKRE	Centre
Last election	31.24%, 37 seats	16.05%, 17 seats	15.28%, 16 seats
Leader	Kristina Kallas	Jonatan Vseviov (Note: Prime Minister candidate for the election. Lauri Läänemets is the party leader)	Urmas Reinsalu
Party	E200	SDE	Isamaa
Last election	13.33%, 14 seats	9.27%, 9 seats	8.21%, 8 seats
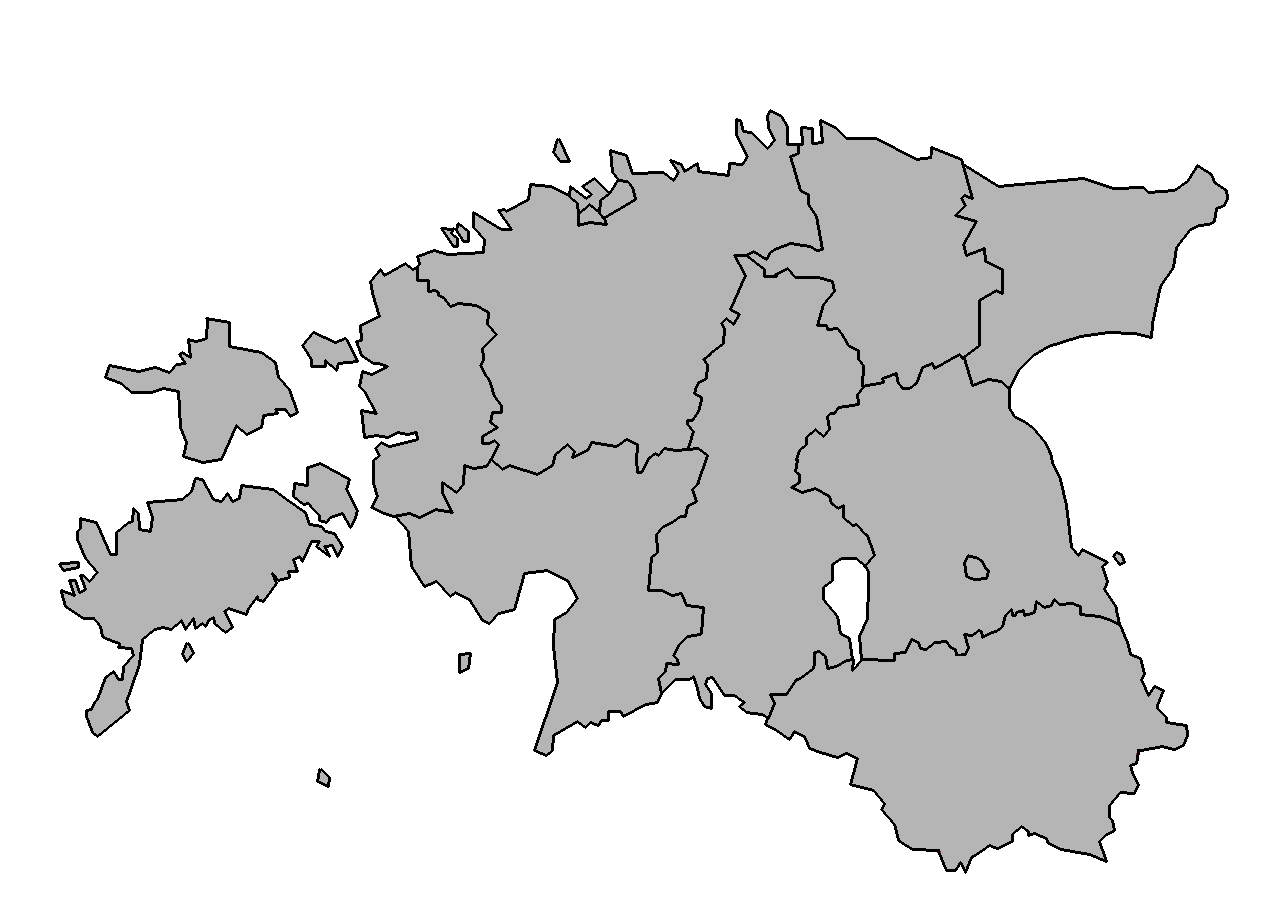
- Electoral districts
Incumbent Prime Minister
Kristen Michal
Reform

Parliamentary elections will be held in Estonia by 7 March 2027 to elect all 101 members of the Riigikogu.

== Background ==
=== Political developments ===
Following the 2023 Estonian parliamentary election, in which the Reform Party managed to maintain its position as biggest party in parliament, its leader and incumbent Prime Minister Kaja Kallas was reconfirmed in the office, forming a coalition with the Social Democrats and Estonia 200.

==== Reform Party ====
In the first year, the party's performance in opinion polls suffered significantly from the party's decision to back several tax increases unpopular with the economically liberal voter base as well as due to a scandal involving party leader Kaja Kallas. In August 2023, she came under the international spotlight after it was revealed that her husband held a significant share in a transportation company, Stark Logistics, which continued business with Russia despite Kallas's previous calls for Estonian companies to cease operations in Russia in the aftermath of the Russian invasion of Ukraine. Kallas tried to minimise the affair and ignored the calls for her resignation from her political opponents, calling the controversy a "witch-hunt".

On 15 July 2024, Prime Minister Kaja Kallas submitted her resignation after being named as the presumptive High Representative of the Union for Foreign Affairs and Security Policy in the von der Leyen Commission II. Her resignation triggered the immediate resignation of her entire cabinet. Kristen Michal succeeded her as Prime Minister.

==== Conservative People's Party (EKRE) ====
After the 2023 parliamentary election, EKRE's support originally skyrocketed due to being the largest opposition party against the incumbent government, yet soon declined as voters began to see Isamaa as a more moderate, fiscally competent and unshakably pro-Ukraine alternative to the government.

A major split in the party took place after the 2024 European Parliament election, with several MPs being expelled from the party, and the party's sole MEP, Jaak Madison leaving the party. Those who departed EKRE accused the EKRE leadership of pro-Russian stances and called for a less aggressive communication style towards political opponents. Several of the politicians who left EKRE subsequently formed the 'Estonian Nationalists and Conservatives' party.

==== Centre Party ====
In September 2023 Mihhail Kõlvart, then-mayor of Tallinn, won the Centre Party's leadership election. His victory marked a significant change in the party's direction, choosing to focus more on its Russophone electoral base and shifting to socially conservative and economically syncretic positions, with the party becoming seen as one specifically of the niche Russian minority concentrated in the capital Tallinn and Ida-Viru County. As a result, in the following months the previous party leader Jüri Ratas and several other party members defected to other political forces, leaving Centre Party with one third of its initial parliamentary representation (down to only 6 MPs) and a weaker position in opinion polls. The party rebounded in polling together with a strong showing in the 2025 Estonian municipal elections, attributed by the return of Russophone voters to the party.

==== Estonia 200 ====
In the months following the 2023 Estonian parliamentary election, Estonia 200 quickly saw its support plummet, which has mostly been attributed to various scandals and the fading of the party's image of novelty. In September 2026, the party weighed a potential merger with the Estonian Greens.

==== Social Democratic Party ====
For the first year since the last election, the Social Democrats remained the only party in the government coalition to avoid losing support in polling. This was attributed to the party members' statements on the party's policy positions, especially those of the leader of the party Lauri Läänemets, setting the Social Democrats ideologically apart from the two economically liberal parties in the coalition. Moreover, the party gained MPs and members from the defections out of the Centre Party, including seeing its number of MPs increase from 9 to 13. On 10 March 2025, Prime Minister Kristen Michal announced a "government repair" and expelled the Social Democrats from the government coalition, citing ideological differences and obstruction.

On 22 October 2026, the Social Democrats announced Secretary General of the Estonian Ministry of Foreign Affairs Jonatan Vseviov as the party's Prime Minister candidate.

==== Isamaa ====
Starting August 2023, Isamaa saw its support quickly rocket to unprecedented historic highs. Those gains in polling were mainly attributed to the party gaining 3 MPs and several other members defecting from the Centre Party, EKRE being seen as too extreme of an option as an alternative to the government coalition and the success of the newly elected party leader Urmas Reinsalu, and his frequent public statements on any topical issues, in attracting disgruntled Reform Party voters unhappy with its fiscal policy.

== Electoral system ==
The Riigikogu is made up of 101 seats and its representatives are elected by proportional representation in twelve multi-member constituencies. First, seats are to be filled in 12 constituencies of 5 to 16 seats depending on their population, and the remaining seats, known as "compensation seats", are allocated using the d'Hondt method to all parties that exceeded the 5% electoral threshold, to bring the results in terms of seats as close as possible to those of the vote of the population. Voters have the possibility of casting a preferential vote for one of the candidates on the list for which they are voting. If a candidate collects more preferential votes than the amount of the simple quotient in their constituency, they are declared elected even if the list for which they are candidate for fails to cross the 5% electoral threshold.

=== Seats by electoral district ===
#	Electoral district	Seats
1	Haabersti, Põhja-Tallinn and Kristiine districts in Tallinn	10
2	Kesklinn, Lasnamäe and Pirita districts in Tallinn	13
3	Mustamäe and Nõmme districts in Tallinn	8
4	Harju (excluding Tallinn) and Rapla counties	16
5	Hiiu, Lääne and Saare counties	6
6	Lääne-Viru county	5
7	Ida-Viru county	6
8	Järva and Viljandi counties	6
9	Jõgeva and Tartu counties (excluding Tartu)	8
10	City of Tartu	8
11	Võru, Valga and Põlva counties	8
12	Pärnu county	7
Source: Postimees

== Parties ==
=== Current composition ===
The table below lists parties represented in the Riigikogu before the election.

Name	Ideology	Leader	PM candidate	2023 result		Current seats	Seat goals
Name	Ideology	Leader	PM candidate	%	Seats	Current seats	Seat goals
Reform Party; Eesti Reformierakond	Right-wing liberalism Neoliberalism	Kristen Michal		31.2%	37 / 101	38 / 101	20 / 101
Conservative People's Party; Eesti Konservatiivne Rahvaerakond	Ultranationalism; Right-wing populism	Martin Helme		16.1%	17 / 101	9 / 101	19 / 101
Centre Party; Eesti Keskerakond	Populism; Left-conservatism	Mihhail Kõlvart		15.3%	16 / 101	10 / 101	
Estonia 200; Eesti 200	Liberalism; Pro-Europeanism	Kristina Kallas		13.3%	14 / 101	12 / 101	
Social Democratic Party; Sotsiaaldemokraatlik Erakond	Social democracy	Lauri Läänemets	Jonatan Vseviov	9.3%	9 / 101	14 / 101	
Isamaa	National conservatism	Urmas Reinsalu		8.2%	8 / 101	11 / 101	25 / 101
Parempoolsed	Economic liberalism	Lavly Perling		2.3%	0 / 101	1 / 101	
Nationalists and Conservatives; Eesti Rahvuslased ja Konservatiivid	National conservatism Estonian nationalism	Rein Suurkask		Did not exist		1 / 101	

=== Party manifestos and slogans ===
Party	Manifesto (external link)	Other slogan(s)
Reform Party	The future is the way forward! (Note: Can also be translated as "A firm direction is the future!" or "The future is the clear course!") (Estonian: Kindel suund on tulevik!)	
Conservative People's Party	Steadfastly for Estonia! (Estonian: Vankumatult Eesti eest!)	

== Opinion polling ==
Local regression chart of poll results up to 7 February 2025
