= David Vseviov =

Estonian historian

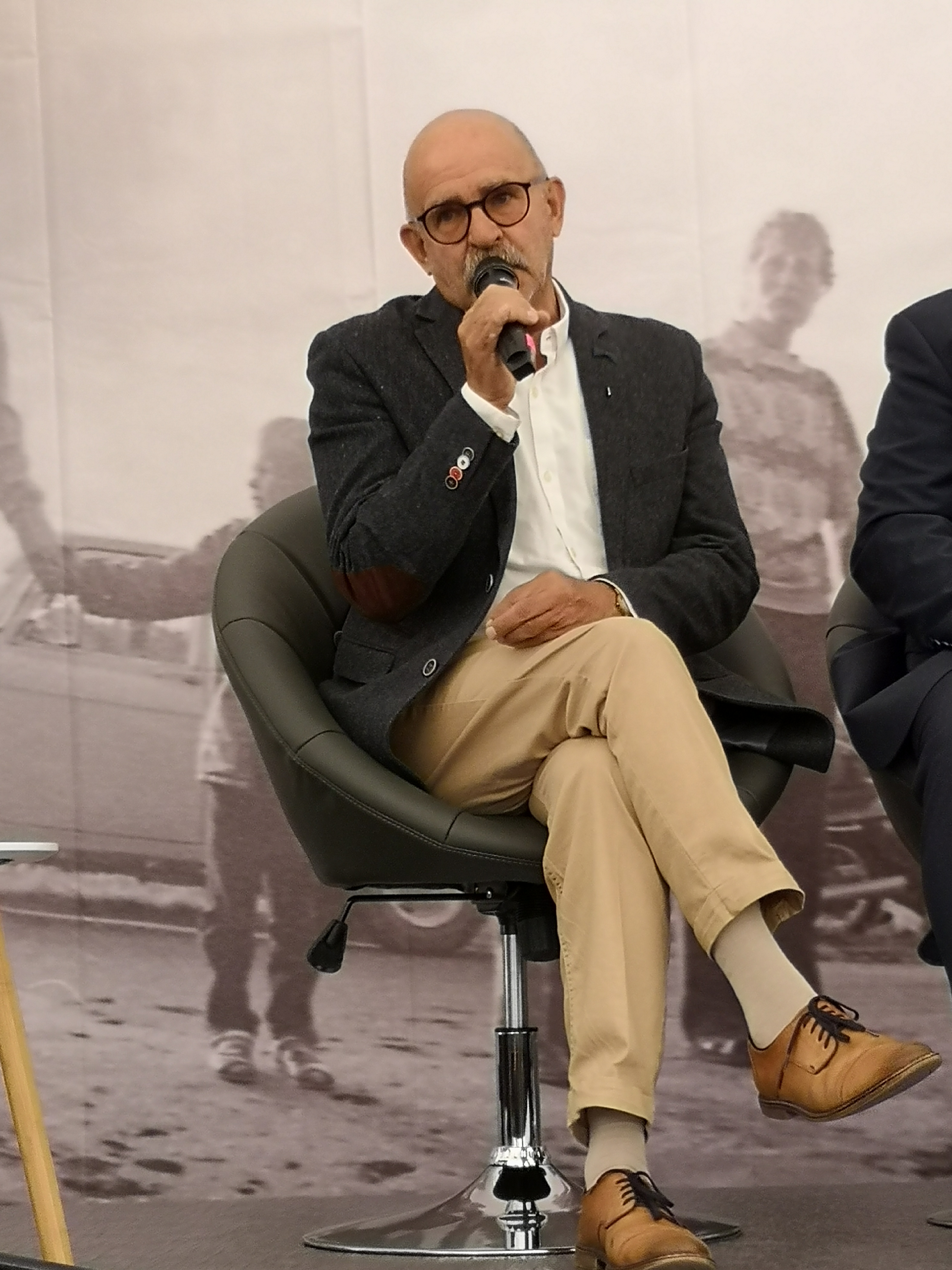
David Vseviov

David Vseviov (born as David Isaakovich Vseviov on 27 May 1949) is an Estonian historian and pedagogue.

== Career ==
David Vseviov was 27 born May 1949 in Tallinn to Isaac Vseviov and Rezi Vseviova. He speaks both Estonian and Russian fluently and is of Jewish heritage.

In 1966 he graduated from Tallinn Secondary School No. 6 (now Tallinn Central Russian Gymnasium), and in 1971 from the Faculty of History and Linguistics of Tartu State University as a historian and history teacher. Since 1986 he has been teaching art history and visual culture at Estonian Academy of Arts (professor).

Since 1997 he has hosted the radio program Müstiline Venemaa ('Mysterious Russia').

Married, has three children. His son Jonatan has worked in the Estonian Ministry of Defence and Foreign Ministry.

== Awards ==
- Estonian Opinion Leader of the Year
- European Parliament's 2016 European Citizen's Prize
- National Culture Award of the Republic of Estonia
- 2001: Order of the White Star, V class.
