= Väino Reinart =

Estonian diplomat

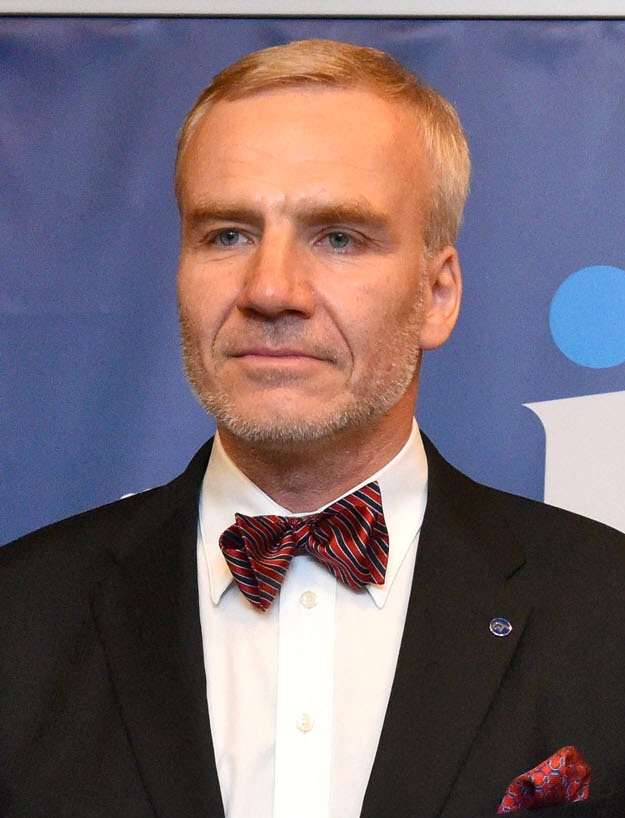
- Reinart in 2016

Permanent Representative of Estonia to OSCE
- In office 1995–1999

Ambassador of Estonia to the United States, Canada and Mexico
- In office 2007–2011
- President: Toomas Hendrik Ilves
- Prime Minister: Andrus Ansip
- Preceded by: Jüri Luik
- Succeeded by: Marina Kaljurand

Ambassador of Estonia to Japan
- In office 2021–2023
- President: Kersti Kaljulaid
- Prime Minister: Jüri Ratas
- Preceded by: Jaak Lensment
- Succeeded by: Mait Martinson

Ambassador of Estonia to Turkey
- In office 2023–Present
- President: Kersti Kaljulaid; Alar Karis
- Prime Minister: Jüri Ratas
- Preceded by: Annely Kolk

Personal details
- Born: Väino Reinart; 28 December 1962 (age 63) Kuressaare, then part of Estonian SSR, Soviet Union
- Occupation: Diplomat

Väino Reinart (born 28 December 1962 in Kuressaare) is an Estonian diplomat.

Since 1992, he has worked for Ministry of Foreign Affairs. 1995–1999, he was Permanent Representative of Estonia to the Organisation for Security and Cooperation in Europe (OSCE) in Vienna. 2007–2011, he was Ambassador of Estonia to the United States, Mexico and Canada. Since 2012, he has been the Estonian Ambassador to Afghanistan.

Since 2018, he is Ambassador of Estonia to Japan.
