= List of ambassadors of Estonia to the United States =

Ambassador of Estonia to the United States Embassy of Estonia, Washington, D.C.
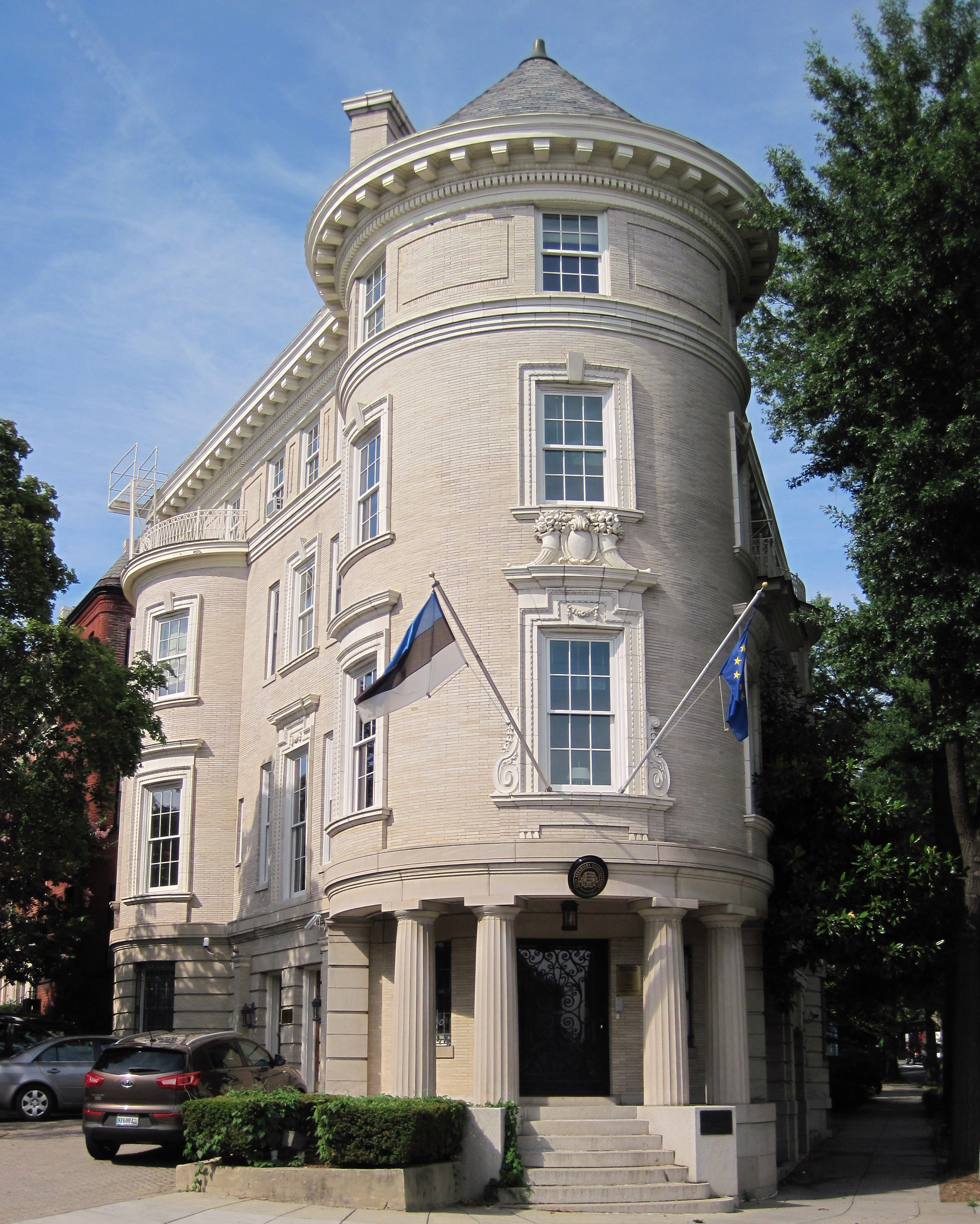
- Incumbent; Kristjan Prikk since July 18, 2021
- Inaugural holder: Ants Piip
- Formation: December 31, 1923

The Estonian ambassador in Washington, D. C. is the official representative of the Government in Tallinn to the Government of the United States.

== List of representatives ==
Diplomatic agrément	Diplomatic accreditation	ambassador	Observations	President of Estonia	List of presidents of the United States	Term end
December 31, 1923			LEGATION OPENED - Listed as Estonia	Konstantin Päts	Calvin Coolidge	
December 31, 1923		Ants Piip		Konstantin Päts	Calvin Coolidge	
December 1, 1926			Listed as Estonia	Jaan Teemant	Calvin Coolidge	
November 17, 1927		Victor Mutt	Consul General in New York in charge of Legation, Colonel	Jaan Teemant	Calvin Coolidge	
April 1, 1932		Charles Kuusik	Acting Consul General in New York in charge of Legation	Jaan Teemant	Herbert C. Hoover	
April 1, 1939		Johannes Kaiv	Acting Consul General in New York in charge of Legation	Konstantin Päts	Franklin D. Roosevelt	
December 15, 1965		Ernst Jaakson	Consul General in New York in charge of Legation	Aleksander Varma	Lyndon B. Johnson	
September 15, 1991	September 30, 1991		ESTONIA 'S DIPLOMATIC NOTE RAISED LEGATION TO EMBASSY DEPARTMENT RESPONDED ACCEPTING EMBASSY ON	Heinrich Mark	George H. W. Bush	
October 25, 1991	November 25, 1991	Ernst Jaakson		Heinrich Mark	George H. W. Bush	
May 20, 1993	September 3, 1993	Toomas Hendrik Ilves		Lennart Meri	Bill Clinton	
April 18, 1997	May 14, 1997	Grigore-Kalev Stoicescu		Lennart Meri	Bill Clinton	
February 10, 2000	June 14, 2000	Sven Jürgenson		Lennart Meri	Bill Clinton	
September 4, 2003	September 10, 2003	Jüri Luik		Arnold Rüütel	George W. Bush	
August 16, 2007	September 18, 2007	Väino Reinart		Toomas Hendrik Ilves	George W. Bush	
September 6, 2011	September 9, 2011	Marina Kaljurand		Toomas Hendrik Ilves	Barack Obama	
August 22, 2014	September 18, 2014	Eerik Marmei		Toomas Hendrik Ilves	Barack Obama	
August 2017	September 8, 2017	Lauri Lepik		Kersti Kaljulaid	Donald Trump	
August 3, 2018		Jonatan Vseviov		Kersti KaljulaidAlar Karis	Donald TrumpJoe Biden	
July 18, 2021		Kristjan Prikk		Alar Karis	Joe Biden	
