= Karin Jaani =

Estonian diplomat and politician

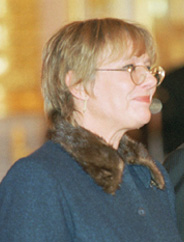
Karin Jaani

Karin Jaani (27 August 1952, Ahja – 7 October 2009) was an Estonian diplomat and politician. She was a member of VIII Riigikogu.

From 2001 until 2005, she was the Ambassador of Estonia to Russian Federation.
