= Jüri Seilenthal =

Estonian diplomat

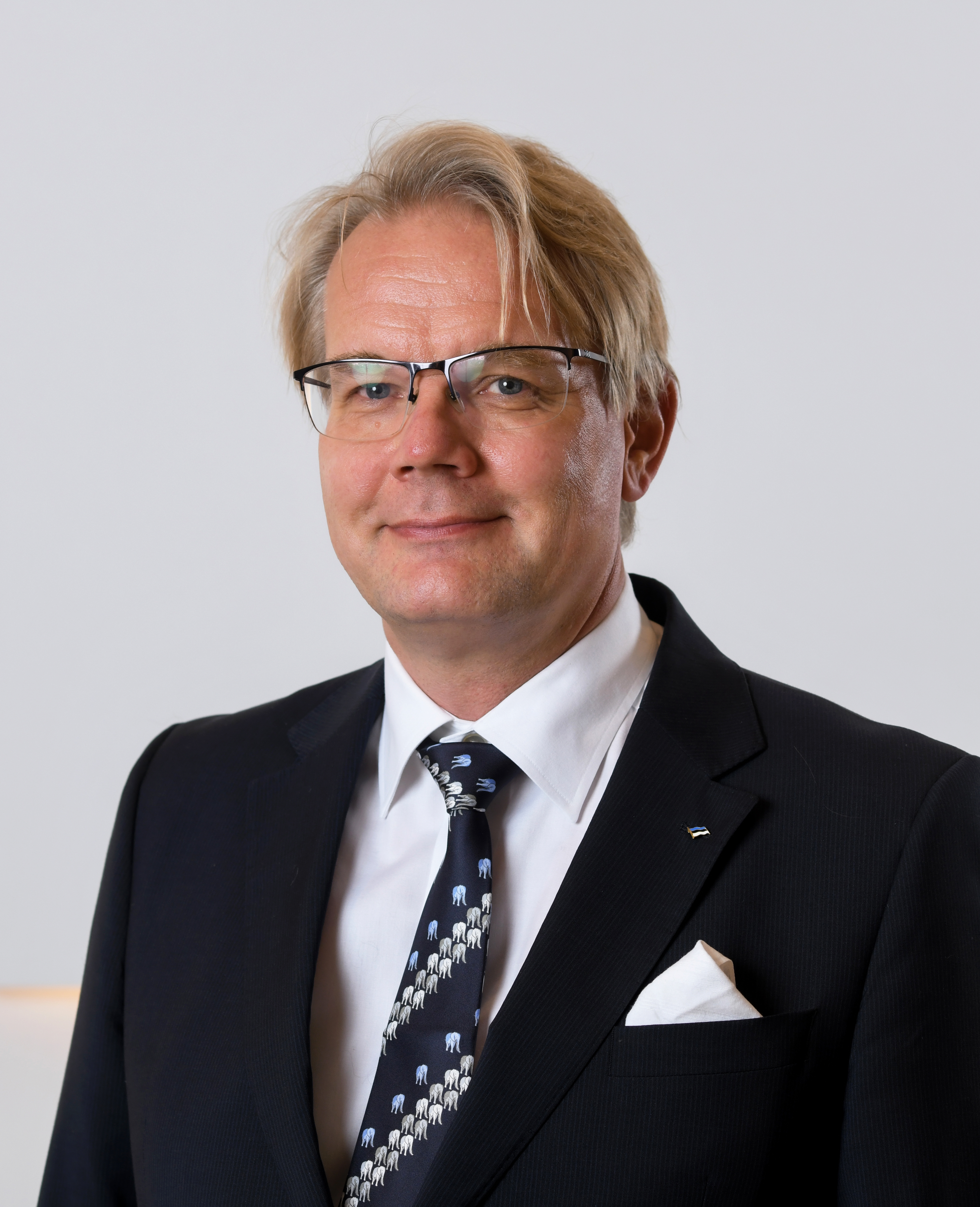

Jüri Seilenthal (born 28 December 1970) is an Estonian diplomat.

He has been Ambassador of Estonia to Israel. 2002-2006 he was Ambassador of Estonia to Italy, and 2003-2006 Ambassador of Estonia to Malta (non-resident). From June 2007 he was Ambassador of Estonia to Holy See.

In 2020 he was General Director of Estonian Foreign Ministry's External Economic and Development Cooperation Department.

He has received several foreign and Estonian decorations, including in 2004 Order of Merit, Italy (Estonian: Itaalia Vabariigi Teeneteordeni suurohvitseririst).
