= Canada–Kenya relations =

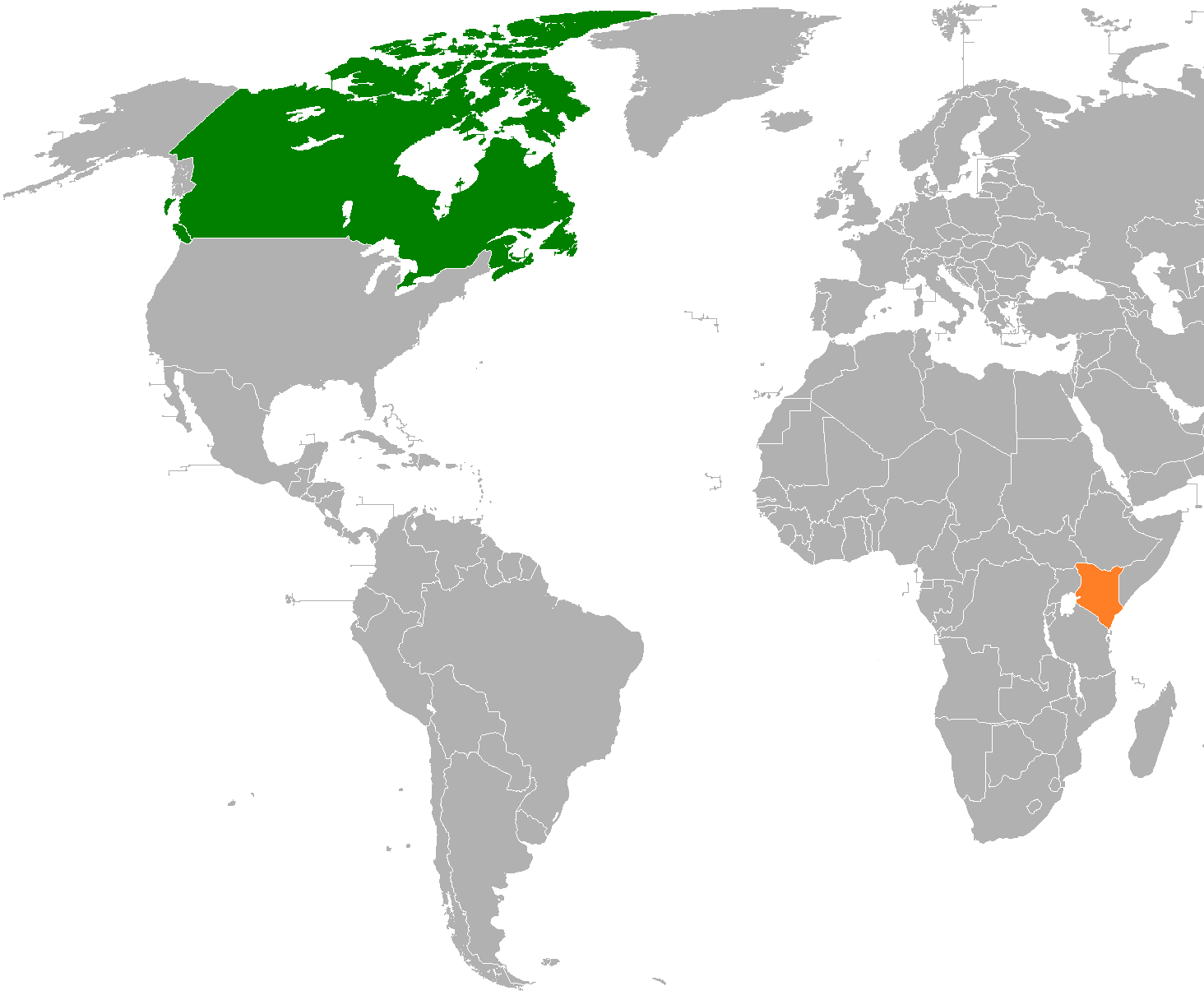

- Canada: Kenya

Canada and the Republic of Kenya established diplomatic relations in 1964. In addition to their bilateral relations, both nations are members of the Commonwealth of Nations and the United Nations.

== History ==
In December 1963, Kenya obtained its independence from the United Kingdom and in 1964, Canada and Kenya established diplomatic relations. In 1967, Canada opened its first resident High Commission in Nairobi. Canada’s High Commission in Nairobi is Canada's largest diplomatic mission in Africa.

Canada and Kenya's relationship is founded on a range of shared interests including poverty reduction, sustainable economic growth, the empowerment of women and girls, supporting refugees, and regional security and stability. In August 1981, Canadian Prime Minister Pierre Trudeau paid a visit to Kenya to attend a U.N. energy conference.

In 1989, Kenyan President, Daniel arap Moi, recalled the Kenyan high commissioner to Canada. Two weeks earlier Somali Canadians had held a protest outside the Kenyan High Commission in Ottawa over a new law requiring the registration of all ethnic Somalis in Kenya. President Moi accused the Canadian government of approving the protest, and demanded an apology. Protests arranged by Moi's Kenya African National Union took place outside the Canadian High Commission and in other cities. In Mombasa an effigy of then High Commissioner Raynell Andreychuk was imprisoned in a street side stall.

In 2008 Canada pledged one million dollars' worth of aid to Kenya after the disputed presidential election of President Mwai Kibaki. Canada posted a travel advisory to any of its citizens cautioning them about situation in Kenya. However, a few months later Canada lifted the advisory and stated that the two were back to "business as usual".

In February 2009, the Canadian government announced that it was dropping Kenya from its list of preferred countries to receive foreign aid. This list includes 18 countries including the West Bank and countries in the Caribbean.

In 2018, Kenyan President Uhuru Kenyatta attended the 44th G7 summit in La Malbaie, Canada and the Women Deliver Conference in Vancouver in 2019. Between 2017-2018, Canada provided US$83.84 million in international assistance to Kenya. In September 2025, Canadian Prime Minister Mark Carney met with Kenyan President William Ruto on the sidelines of the U.N General Assembly in New York and discussed Kenya’s leadership in the United Nations Multinational Security Support mission in Haiti and Canada's support.

== High-level visits ==
High-level visits from Canada to Kenya

- Prime Minister Pierre Trudeau (1981)
- Secretary of State Randeep Sarai (2026)

High-level visits from Kenya to Canada

- President Uhuru Kenyatta (2018, 2019)
- Secretary for Foreign and Diaspora Affairs Alfred Mutua (2023)

== Trade ==
In 2023, two-way trade between Canada and Kenya totaled US$157 million. Canada's main exports to Kenya include: vehicles and equipment, vegetable products, and textile products. Kenya's main exports to Canada include: vegetable products and textile products.

== Resident diplomatic missions ==
- Canada has a high commission in Nairobi.
- Kenya has a high commission in Ottawa.

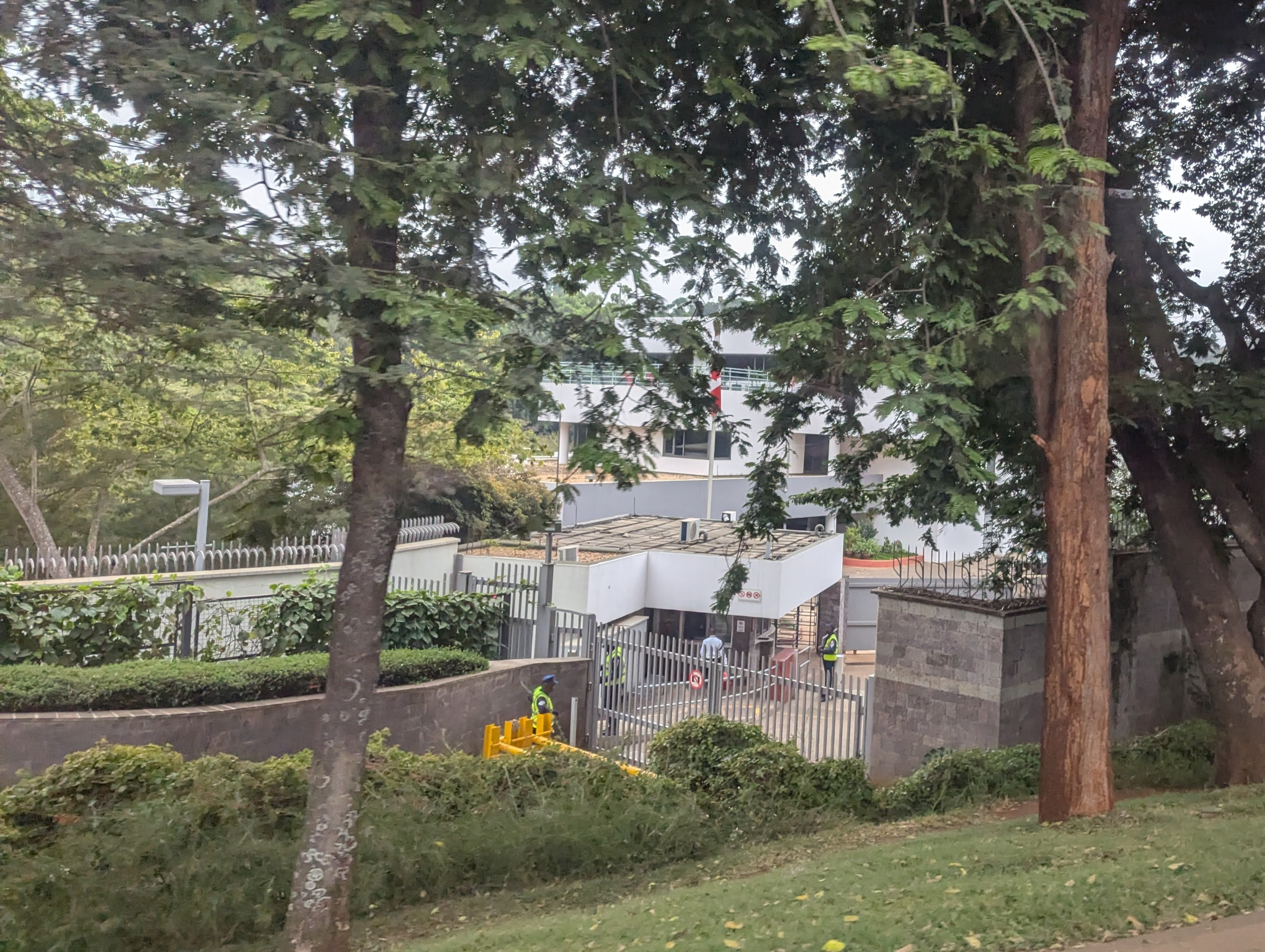
High Commission of Canada in Nairobi

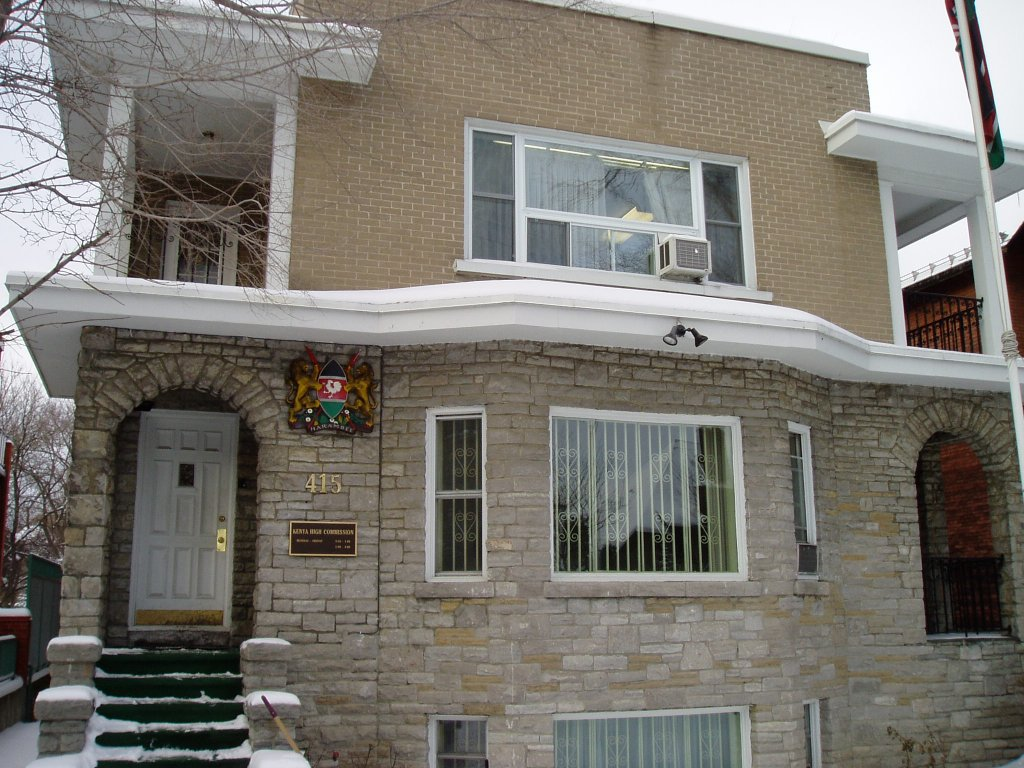
High Commission of Kenya in Ottawa

== See also ==
- Foreign relations of Canada
- Foreign relations of Kenya
