= Lauri Lepik =

Estonian diplomat and civil servant

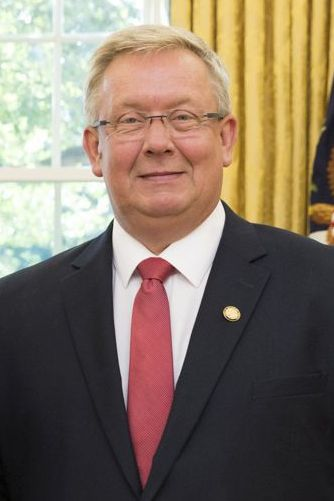
Lauri Lepik

Lauri Lepik (born 14 October 1960 in Tallinn) is an Estonian diplomat and civil servant.

== Biography ==
He graduated from Tallinn 7th Secondary School. In 1985, he graduated from the Tallinn Pedagogical Institute with a diploma thesis in the field of librarianship and bibliography "Use of databases in environmental information services".

In 1987–1992, he was the research director of the Estonian National Library.

In 2003, he graduated from Humboldt University in political sciences. He was a member of the board of the re-established Estonian Librarians' Association. In 1992–1995 he worked at the State Chancellery.

Diplomatic posts:

- 2011-2012 – Ambassador of Estonia to Ukraine and to Moldova.
- Since 2012 – Permanent Representative of Estonia to North Atlantic Council.
- Since 2017 – Ambassador of Estonia to the United States.
