= Estonia–Mexico relations =

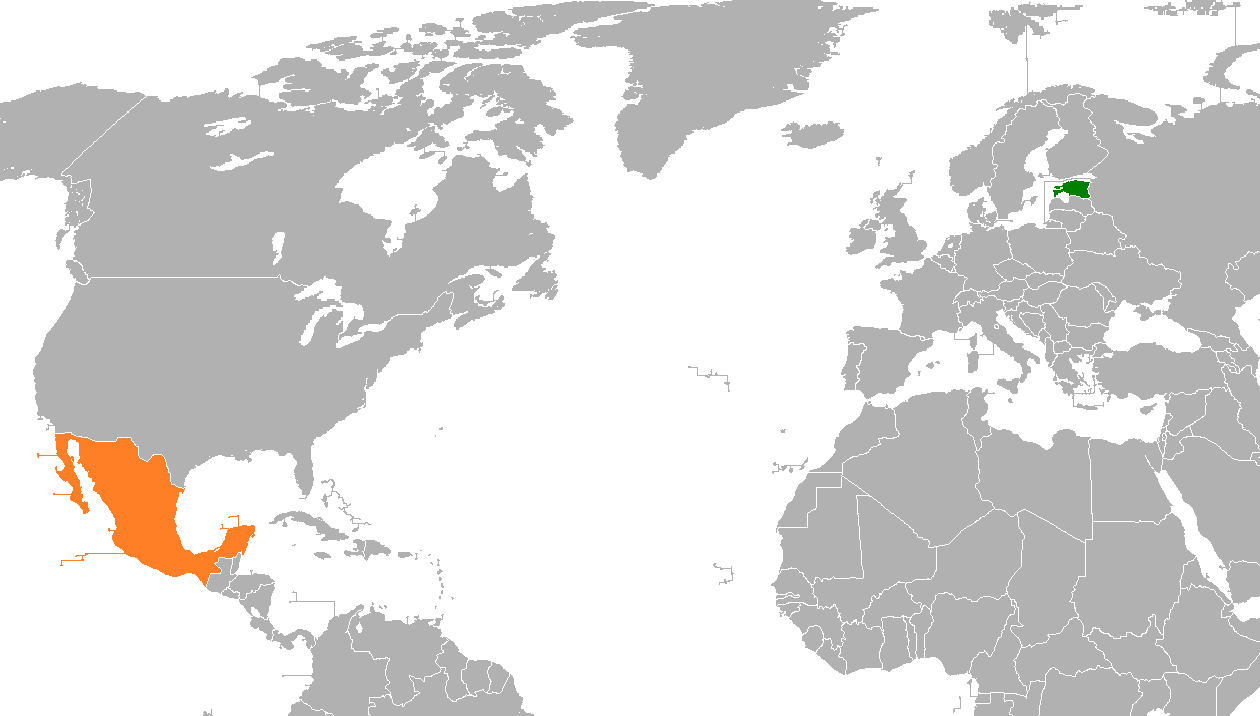

- Estonia: Mexico

The nations of Estonia and Mexico initially established diplomatic relations in 1937, however, relations were broken after the annexation of Estonia by the USSR in 1944. Diplomatic relations were re-established in 1991. Both nations are members of the Organisation for Economic Co-operation and Development and the United Nations.

== History ==
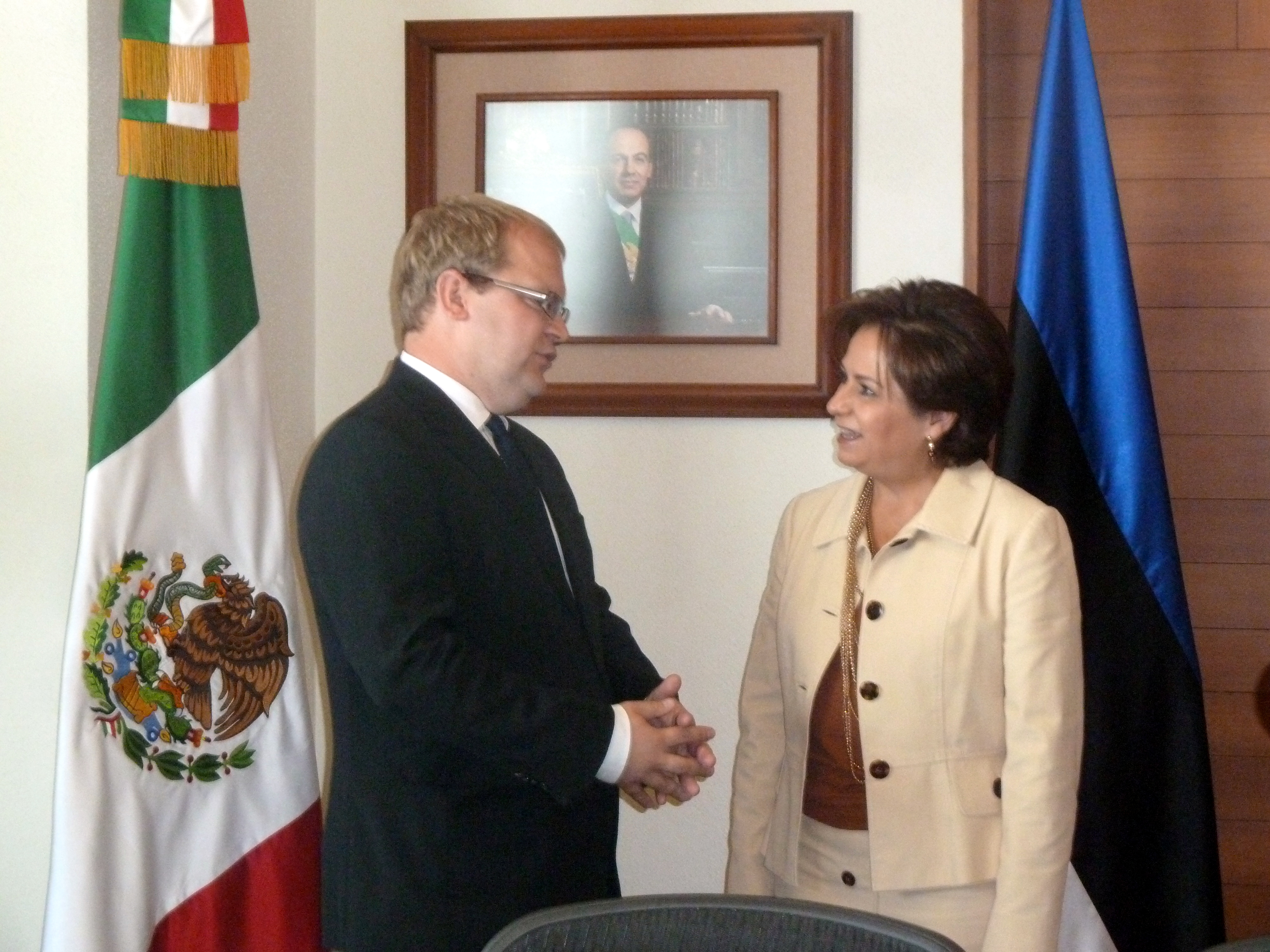
Estonian Foreign Minister Urmas Paet and Mexican Foreign Minister Patricia Espinosa Cantellano in Mexico City; October 2012.

Estonia and Mexico established diplomatic relations on 28 January 1937 in New York City. On 3 January 1938, a Friendship Agreement between the two nations took effect. In 1941, during World War II, Estonia was occupied by both Nazi Germany and the Soviet Union. After the war, Estonia was annexed by the Soviet Union in September 1944. Mexico was one of the few countries that did not recognize the Soviet annexation of Estonia.

In August 1991, Estonia obtained its independence after the Dissolution of the Soviet Union. Mexico soon recognized the independence of Estonia on 5 September 1991 and re-established diplomatic relations with the country on 5 December 1991. Since then, Mexico has been accredited to Estonia from its embassy in Helsinki, Finland and Estonia has been accredited to Mexico from its embassy in Washington, D.C., United States.

In October 1995, Estonian President Lennart Meri paid a visit to Mexico and met with President Ernesto Zedillo. In May 2004, Estonian Prime Minister Juhan Parts attended the Latin America, the Caribbean and the European Union Summit held in Guadalajara. In September 2005, Mexican Foreign Undersecretary Lourdes Aranda traveled to Estonia.

In October 2012, Estonian Foreign Minister Urmas Paet paid a visit to Mexico and met with his counterpart Patricia Espinosa. Foreign Minister Paet would return again to Mexico in May 2013 and meet with Foreign Secretary José Antonio Meade.

In 2018, Mexican graffiti artists donated 30 murals for Estonia's centenary.

In October 2021, the Director General for Europe, Bernardo Aguilar Calvo, paid a visit to Tallinn and led the Mexican delegation at the VI meeting of the Mechanism for Political Consultations between Mexico and Estonia. Within the framework of this meeting, both countries reviewed the progress in the bilateral relationship and exchanged points of view on regional issues.

== High-level visits ==
High-level visits from Estonia to Mexico

- President Lennart Meri (1995)
- Prime Minister Juhan Parts (2004)
- Foreign Minister Urmas Paet (2012, 2013)
- Chancellor of the Ministry of Foreign Affairs Väino Reinart (2015)

High-level visits from Mexico to Estonia

- Foreign Undersecretary Lourdes Aranda (2005)
- Foreign Undersecretary Carlos de Icaza González (2014)
- Director General for Europe Bernardo Aguilar Calvo (2021)

== Bilateral agreements ==
Both nations have signed a few bilateral agreements such as a Friendship Agreement (1938); Agreement on Technical Cooperation (1995); Agreement on Educational, Cultural and Sports Cooperation (2005) and an Agreement to Avoid Double Taxation and Prevent Tax Evasion in Relation to Income Taxes and its Protocol (2012).

== Trade ==
In 1997, Mexico signed a Free Trade Agreement with the European Union (which includes Estonia). In 2023, trade between Estonia and Mexico totaled US$93 million. Estonia's main exports to Mexico include: telephones and mobile phones, machinery and electrical equipment, parts and accessories of motor vehicles, chemical based products, plastic, peat, articles of iron or steel, and yeasts. Mexico's main exports to Estonia include: instruments and apparatus for measuring or detecting radiation alpha, beta, gamma, x-ray, cosmic or other ionizing radiations; electronic integrated circuits, tools, trailers and semi-trailers, leather and hides, alcohol, fruits and vegetables and food based products, and natural stones. Estonian companies such as Bolt and X-Road operate in Mexico.

== Diplomatic missions ==
- Estonia is accredited to Mexico from its embassy in Washington, D.C., United States and maintains honorary consulates in Mexico City and in Tampico.
- Mexico is accredited to Estonia from its embassy in Helsinki, Finland and maintains an honorary consulate in Tallinn.

== See also ==
- Foreign relations of Estonia
- Foreign relations of Mexico
