= Ministry of Climate =

Government ministry of Estonia

Agency overview
- Formed: 21 December 1989
- Jurisdiction: Government of Estonia
- Headquarters: Suur-Ameerika 1, 10122 Tallinn, Estonia
- Annual budget: €202 million (2023)
- Minister responsible: Andres Sutt, Minister of Energy and the Environment
- Website: https://kliimaministeerium.ee/en/

The Ministry of Climate (Estonian: Kliimaministeerium) is a government ministry of Estonia responsible for the issue of policies regarding climate, transport, energy, mineral resources, environmental awareness, fisheries and hunting in Estonia. The ministry is headed by Minister of Energy and the Environment, who is currently Andres Sutt, and Minister of Infrastructure, who is currently Kuldar Leis.

The ministry was named as the Ministry of the Environment until 30 June 2023.

== List of ministers ==
Portrait	Minister	Party	Term of office	Prime Minister
Minister of the Environment
	Tiit Nuudi	Independent	21 December 1989 – 11 April 1990 (111 days)	
	Toomas Frey	Independent	11 April 1990 – 13 February 1991 (308 days)	
	Tõnis Kaasik	Independent	13 February 1991 – 22 October 1992 (1 year, 252 days)	
	Andres Tarand	Moderates	21 October 1992 – 8 November 1994 (2 years, 18 days)	Laar (I)
	Vootele Hansen	Moderates	8 November 1994 – 20 April 1995 (163 days)	Tarand (I)
	Villu Reiljan	People's Union	20 April 1995 – 9 March 1999 (3 years, 323 days)	Vähi (II, III); Siimann (I)
	Heiki Kranich	Reform Party	25 March 1999 – 10 April 2003 (4 years, 16 days)	Laar (II); Kallas (I)
	Villu Reiljan	People's Union	10 April 2003 – 8 October 2006 (3 years, 181 days)	Parts (I); Ansip (I)
	Rein Randver	People's Union	11 October 2006 – 5 April 2007 (176 days)	Ansip (I)
	Jaanus Tamkivi	Reform Party	5 April 2007 – 5 April 2011 (4 years, 0 days)	Ansip (II)
	Keit Pentus-Rosimannus	Reform Party	6 April 2011 – 17 November 2014 (3 years, 225 days)	Ansip (III); Rõivas (I)
	Mati Raidma	Reform Party	17 November 2014 – 9 April 2015 (143 days)	Rõivas (I)
	Marko Pomerants	Pro Patria and Res Publica Union	9 April 2015 – 12 June 2017 (2 years, 64 days)	Rõivas (II); Ratas (I)
	Siim Kiisler	Pro Patria and Res Publica Union	12 June 2017 – 29 April 2019 (1 year, 321 days)	Ratas (I)
	Rene Kokk	Conservative People's Party of Estonia	29 April 2019 – 7 November 2020 (1 year, 192 days)	Ratas (II)
	Rain Epler	Conservative People's Party of Estonia	16 November 2020 – 26 January 2021 (71 days)	Ratas (II)
	Tõnis Mölder	Estonian Centre Party	26 January 2021 – 18 November 2021 (296 days)	Kallas (I)
	Erki Savisaar	Estonian Centre Party	18 November 2021 – 3 June 2022 (197 days)	Kallas (I)
	Madis Kallas	Social Democratic Party	18 July 2022 – 17 April 2023 (273 days)	Kallas (II)
Minister of Climate
	Kristen Michal	Reform Party	17 April 2023 - 23 July 2024	Kallas (III)
	Yoko Alender	Reform Party	23 July 2024 - 25 March 2025	Michal (I)
Minister of Energy and the Environment
	Andres Sutt	Reform Party	25 March 2025 -	Michal (I)
