= Ministry of Regional Affairs and Agriculture =

Government ministry of Estonia

Agency overview
- Jurisdiction: Government of Estonia
- Headquarters: Suur-Ameerika tn 1, 10122 Tallinn, Estonia
- Annual budget: €794 million (2025)
- Minister responsible: Hendrik Johannes Terras, Minister of Regional Affairs and Agriculture
- Child agencies: Agricultural Registers and Information Board; Agriculture and Food Board
- Website: https://www.agri.ee/en

The Ministry of Regional Affairs and Agriculture (Estonian: Regionaal- ja Põllumajandusministeerium) is a government ministry of Estonia responsible for policies regarding agriculture, food market and food safety, animal health, welfare and breeding, bioeconomy and fishing industry in Estonia. The ministry is headed by Minister of Regional Affairs and Agriculture, who is currently Hendrik Johannes Terras.

== List of ministers ==
Name	Party	Term of office		Duration	Prime Minister
Minister of Agriculture
Harri Õunapuu	no party affiliation	13 February 1991	30 January 1992	351 days	Savisaar
Aavo Mölder	Eesti Maaliit	19 February 1992	21 October 1992	245 days	Vähi (I)
Jaan Leetsaar	Moderates	21 October 1992	8 November 1994	2 years, 18 days	Laar (I)
Aldo Tamm	Agrarian-Center	8 November 1994	17 April 1995	160 days	Tarand (I)
Ilmar Mändmets	Coalition Party and Country People's Union	17 April 1995	17 March 1997	1 year, 334 days	Vähi (II, III)
Andres Varik	Estonian Country People's Party	17 March 1997	25 March 1999	2 years, 8 days	Siimann (I)
Ivari Padar	Moderates	25 March 1999	28 January 2002	2 years, 309 days	Laar (II)
Jaanus Marrandi	Centre Party	28 January 2002	10 April 2003	1 year, 72 days	Kallas (I)
Tiit Tammsaar	People's Union of Estonia	10 April 2003	2 April 2004	358 days	Parts (I)
Ester Tuiksoo	People's Union of Estonia	5 April 2004	5 April 2007	3 years, 0 days	Parts (I); Ansip (I)
Helir-Valdor Seeder	Pro Patria and Res Publica	5 April 2007	26 March 2014	6 years, 355 days	Ansip (II, III)
Andres Anvelt	Social Democratic	26 March 2014	7 April 2014	12 days	Rõivas (I)
Ivari Padar	Social Democratic	7 April 2014	9 April 2015	1 year, 2 days	Rõivas (I)
Minister of Rural Affairs
Urmas Kruuse	Reform Party	9 April 2015	23 November 2016	1 year, 228 days	Rõivas (II)
Martin Repinski	Centre Party	23 November 2016	9 December 2016	16 days	Ratas (I)
Tarmo Tamm	Centre Party	12 December 2016	29 April 2019	2 years, 139 days	Ratas (I)
Mart Järvik	Conservative People's Party of Estonia	29 April 2019	25 November 2019	209 days	Ratas (II)
Arvo Aller	Conservative People's Party of Estonia	10 December 2019	26 January 2021	1 year, 47 days	Ratas (II)
Urmas Kruuse	Reform Party	26 January 2021	17 April 2023	2 years, 81 days	Kallas (I, II)
Minister of Regional Affairs
Madis Kallas	Social Democratic	17 April 2023	16 April 2024	3 years, 194 days	Kallas (III)
Piret Hartman	Social Democratic	29 April 2024	23 July 2024	316 days	Kallas (III)
Minister of Regional Affairs and Agriculture
Piret Hartman	Social Democratic	23 July 2024	11 March 2025	231 days	Michal (I)
Hendrik Johannes Terras	Estonia 200	25 March 2025		1 year, 217 days	Michal (I)
