= Kristen Michal's cabinet =

Government of Estonia from 2024

- 54th Cabinet of Estonia
- Incumbent
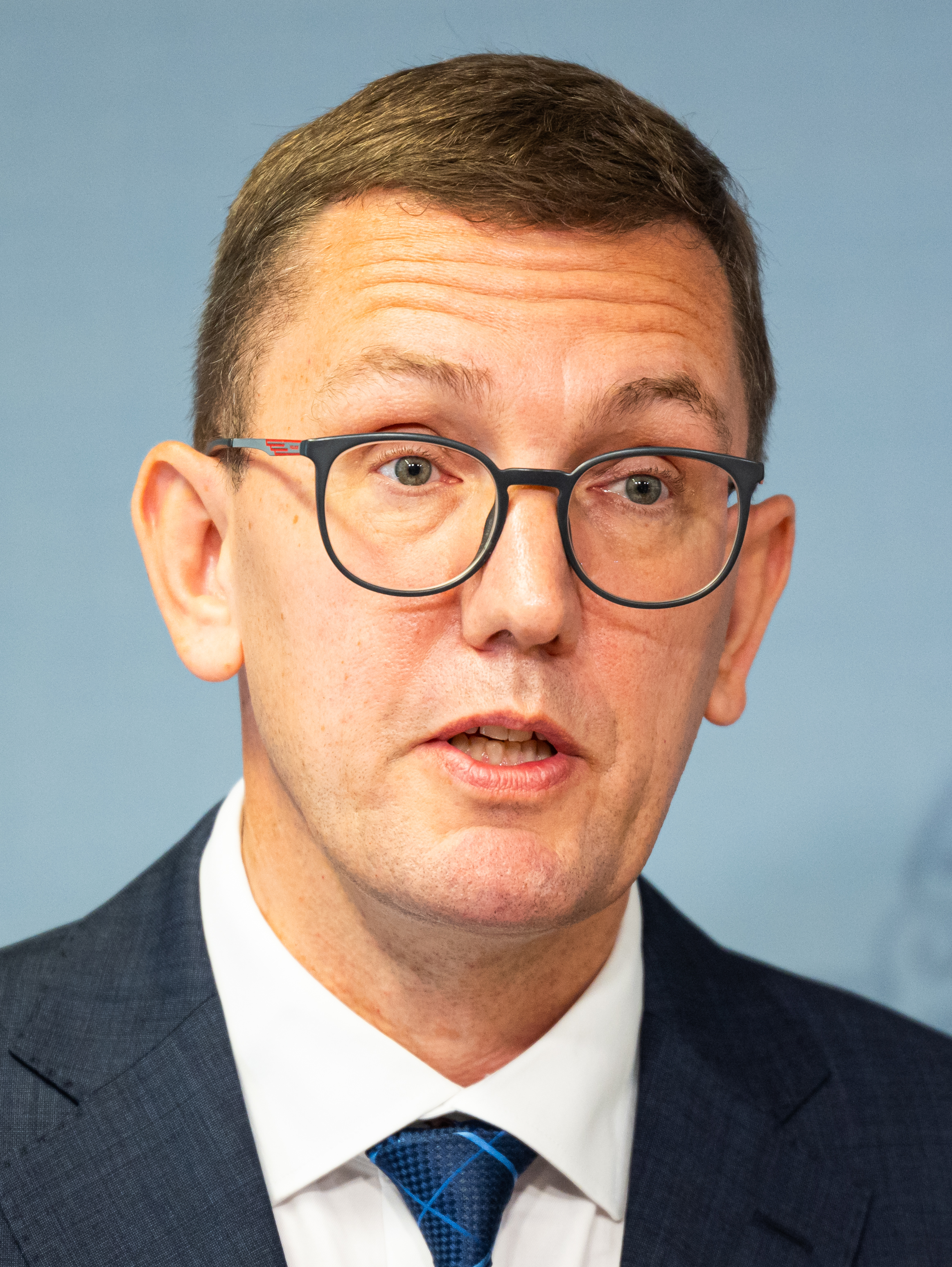
- Date formed: 23 July 2024

People and organisations
- Head of state: Alar Karis
- Head of government: Kristen Michal
- No. of ministers: 14
- Total no. of members: 14
- Member parties: Reform; E200; SDE (until 11 March 2025)
- Status in legislature: Majority (coalition) (2024-2026); Minority (coalition) (2026-present)
- Opposition parties: SDE (since 11 March 2025); Isamaa; EKRE; Centre; ERK

History
- Election: 2023 election
- Predecessor: Kaja Kallas's third cabinet

The cabinet of Kristen Michal is the current cabinet of Estonia. The cabinet was sworn into office on 23 July 2024 following the resignation of Kaja Kallas as prime minister following her appointment as the European Union's High Representative of the Union for Foreign Affairs and Security Policy.

The government lost its majority in the parliament in August 2026 after the defections of multiple MPs.

== Background ==
In the aftermath of the 2023 Estonian parliamentary election, the Reform Party increased their number of seats, and incumbent prime minister Kaja Kallas opted to open coalition negotiations with Estonia 200 and the Social Democrats on 7 March 2023.

After Kaja Kallas' appointment as the High Representative of the European Union, she resigned as prime minister and the Reform Party board nominated Kristen Michal to pursue coalition negotiations to form a new government. Michal opted to continue with the same coalition partners of Estonia 200 and the Social Democrats.

=== Government repair ===
On 10 March 2025, Kristen Michal announced a "government repair" and expelled the Social Democrats from the coalition. Michal asked the President to remove the party's ministers from office on 11 March. He stated that the remaining coalition intends to move toward the right and scrap several tax hikes and wage increases.

Out of new ministers, Igor Taro replaced Lauri Läänemets as Minister of the Interior, Andres Sutt replaced Yoko Alender as the renamed Minister of Environment and Energetics, Kuldar Leis replaced Vladimir Svet as Minister of Infrastructure and Hendrik Johannes Terras replaced Piret Hartman as the Minister of Regional Affairs. Karmen Joller became the Minister of Social Affairs, replacing and combining the portfolios of Minister of Health Riina Sikkut and Minister of Social Protection Signe Riisalo. The new ministers of the government were sworn in on 25 March 2025.

== Ministers ==
The cabinet consists of 14 ministers, seven from the Reform Party (including the prime minister), four from the Social Democrats and three from Estonia 200. The appointment of Vladimir Svet for Minister of Infrastructure was a surprise to many as he had been a member of the Estonian Centre Party right before his appointment, as well as due to his unclear position on the Annexation of Crimea by the Russian Federation.

| Portfolio | Minister | Took office | Left office | Party |
Government's Office
| Prime Minister | Kristen Michal | 23 July 2024 | Incumbent | Reform |
Ministry of Finance
| Minister of Finance | Jürgen Ligi | 23 July 2024 | Incumbent | Reform |
Ministry of Foreign Affairs
| Minister of Foreign Affairs | Margus Tsahkna | 23 July 2024 | Incumbent | Estonia 200 |
Ministry of Economic Affairs and Communications
| Minister of Economic Affairs and Industry | Erkki Keldo | 23 July 2024 | 16 September 2026 | Reform |
| Minister of Economic Affairs and Industry | Liina Vahtras | 16 September 2026 | Incumbent | Reform |
Ministry of Justice
| Minister of Justice and Digital Affairs | Liisa Pakosta | 23 July 2024 | Incumbent | Estonia 200 |
Ministry of Defence
| Minister of Defence | Hanno Pevkur | 23 July 2024 | 16 September 2026 | Reform |
| Minister of Defence | Martin Herem | 16 September 2026 | Incumbent | Independent |
Ministry of Culture
| Minister of Culture | Heidy Purga | 23 July 2024 | Incumbent | Reform |
Ministry of the Interior
| Minister of the Interior | Lauri Läänemets | 23 July 2024 | 11 March 2025 | SDE |
| Minister of the Interior | Igor Taro | 25 March 2025 | Incumbent | Estonia 200 |
Ministry of Education and Research
| Minister of Education and Research | Kristina Kallas | 23 July 2024 | Incumbent | Estonia 200 |
Ministry of Climate
| Minister of Climate | Yoko Alender | 23 July 2024 | 25 March 2025 | Reform |
| Minister of Energetics and Environment | Andres Sutt | 25 March 2025 | 16 September 2026 | Reform |
| Minister of Energetics and Environment | Erkki Keldo | 16 September 2026 | Incumbent | Reform |
| Minister of Infrastructure | Vladimir Svet | 23 July 2024 | 11 March 2025 | SDE |
| Minister of Infrastructure | Kuldar Leis | 25 March 2025 | Incumbent | Reform |
Ministry of Social Affairs
| Minister of Health | Riina Sikkut | 23 July 2024 | 11 March 2025 | SDE |
| Minister of Social Protection | Signe Riisalo | 23 July 2024 | 25 March 2025 | Reform |
| Minister of Social Affairs | Karmen Joller | 25 March 2025 | Incumbent | Reform |
Ministry of Regional Affairs and Agriculture
| Minister of Regional Affairs | Piret Hartman | 23 July 2024 | 11 March 2025 | SDE |
| Minister of Regional Affairs | Hendrik Johannes Terras | 25 March 2025 | Incumbent | Estonia 200 |

| Preceded by Kaja Kallas's third cabinet | Government of Estonia; 2024– | Succeeded by Incumbent |
