= Government of Estonia =

National government

Government of the Republic of Estonia
- Estonian: Eesti Vabariigi valitsus
- Central government
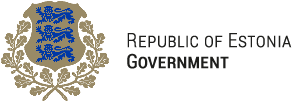

Overview
- Established: 24 February 1918
- Dissolved: suspended from 17 June 1940 – 21 August 1991 (de facto)
- State: Republic of Estonia
- Leader: Prime Minister of Estonia
- Appointed by: President of Estonia
- Main organ: Government Office of Estonia
- Headquarters: Rahukohtu 3, 15161 Tallinn, Estonia
- Website: www.valitsus.ee/en

The Government of the Republic of Estonia (Estonian: Vabariigi Valitsus) is the cabinet of Estonia. Under the Constitution, it exercises executive power pursuant to the Constitution and laws of Estonia.

The cabinet carries out the country's domestic and foreign policy, shaped by parliament (Riigikogu); it directs and coordinates the work of government institutions and bears full responsibility for everything occurring within the authority of executive power. The government, headed by the Prime Minister, thus represents the political leadership of the country and makes decisions in the name of the whole executive power.

The following duties are attributed to the cabinet by the Constitution of Estonia:

1. executes the domestic and foreign policies of the state;
2. directs and coordinates the activities of government agencies;
3. administers the implementation of laws, resolutions of the Riigikogu (Parliament), and legislation of the President of the Republic of Estonia;
4. introduces bills, and submits international treaties to the Riigikogu for ratification and denunciation;
5. prepares the draft of the state budget and submits it to the Riigikogu, administers the implementation of the state budget and presents a report on the implementation of the state budget to the Riigikogu;
6. issues regulations and orders on the basis of and for the implementation of law;
7. manages relations with other states;
8. performs other duties which the Constitution and the laws vest in the Government of the Republic.

Unlike other cabinets in most other parliamentary regimes, the Government is both the de jure and de facto executive authority in Estonia. In most other parliamentary regimes, the head of state is usually the nominal chief executive, though bound by convention to act on the advice of the cabinet. In Estonia, however, the Constitution explicitly vests executive authority in the Government, not the President.

== Current cabinet ==
The current cabinet was approved by the Riigikogu on 23 July 2024.

The coalition agreed on 13 ministers in addition to the prime minister with six portfolios going to the Reform Party, four going to the Social Democrats and three to Estonia 200.

On 10 March 2025, Kristen Michal announced a "government repair" and expelled the Social Democrats from the coalition. The new cabinet consists of 13 members, eight from the Reform Party (including the prime minister) and five from Estonia 200. The new ministers of the government were sworn in on 25 March 2025.

Portfolio	Minister	Took office	Left office	Party
Government's Office
Prime Minister	Kristen Michal	23 July 2024	Incumbent	Reform
Ministry of Finance
Minister of Finance	Jürgen Ligi	23 July 2024	Incumbent	Reform
Ministry of Foreign Affairs
Minister of Foreign Affairs	Margus Tsahkna	23 July 2024	Incumbent	Estonia 200
Ministry of Economic Affairs and Communications
Minister of Economic Affairs and Information Technology	Liina Vahtras	16 September 2026	Incumbent	Reform
Ministry of Justice
Minister of Justice and Digital Affairs	Liisa Pakosta	23 July 2024	Incumbent	Estonia 200
Ministry of Defence
Minister of Defence	Martin Herem	16 September 2026	Incumbent	Independent
Ministry of Culture
Minister of Culture	Heidy Purga	23 July 2024	Incumbent	Reform
Ministry of the Interior
Minister of the Interior	Igor Taro	25 March 2025	Incumbent	Estonia 200
Ministry of Education and Research
Minister of Education and Research	Kristina Kallas	23 July 2024	Incumbent	Estonia 200
Ministry of Climate
Minister of Environment and Energetics	Andres Sutt	25 March 2025	Incumbent	Reform
Minister of Infrastructure	Kuldar Leis	25 March 2025	Incumbent	Reform
Ministry of Social Affairs
Minister of Social Affairs	Karmen Joller	25 March 2025	Incumbent	Reform
Ministry of Regional Affairs and Agriculture
Minister of Regional Affairs	Hendrik Johannes Terras	25 March 2025	Incumbent	Estonia 200

== Previous cabinets ==
=== Estonian Provisional Government ===
Number	Government	Term of office	Days in office
1	Konstantin Päts' first provisional cabinet	24 February 1918 – 12 November 1918	262
2	Konstantin Päts' second provisional cabinet	12 November 1918 – 27 November 1918	16
3	Konstantin Päts' third provisional cabinet	27 November 1918 – 9 May 1919	164

=== Constituent cabinets ===
Number	Government	Term of office	Days in office
4	Otto Strandman's first cabinet	9 May 1919 – 18 November 1919	194
5	Jaan Tõnisson's first cabinet	18 November 1919 – 28 July 1920	254
6	Ado Birk's cabinet	28 July 1920 – 30 July 1920	3
7	Jaan Tõnisson's second cabinet	30 July 1920 – 26 October 1920	89
8	Ants Piip's cabinet	26 October 1920 – 25 January 1921	92

=== Riigikogu cabinets ===
Number	Government	Term of office	Days in office
9	Konstantin Päts' first cabinet	25 January 1921 – 21 November 1922	666
10	Juhan Kukk's cabinet	21 November 1922 – 2 August 1923	255
11	Konstantin Päts' second cabinet	2 August 1923 – 26 March 1924	238
12	Friedrich Karl Akel's cabinet	26 March 1924 – 16 December 1924	266
13	Jüri Jaakson's cabinet	16 December 1924 – 15 December 1925	365
14	Jaan Teemant's first cabinet	15 December 1925 – 23 July 1926	221
15	Jaan Teemant's second cabinet	23 July 1926 – 4 March 1927	225
16	Jaan Teemant's third cabinet	4 March 1927 – 9 December 1927	281
17	Jaan Tõnisson's third cabinet	9 December 1927 – 4 December 1928	362
18	August Rei's cabinet	4 December 1928 – 9 July 1929	218
19	Otto Strandman's second cabinet	9 July 1929 – 12 February 1931	584
20	Konstantin Päts' third cabinet	12 February 1931 – 19 February 1932	373
21	Jaan Teemant's fourth cabinet	19 February 1932 – 19 July 1932	152
22	Kaarel Eenpalu's first cabinet	19 July 1932 – 1 November 1932	106
23	Konstantin Päts' fourth cabinet	1 November 1932 – 18 May 1933	199
24	Jaan Tõnisson's fourth cabinet	18 May 1933 – 21 October 1933	157
25	Konstantin Päts' fifth cabinet	21 October 1933 – 24 April 1938	1647

=== Presidents cabinet ===
Number	Government	Term of office	Days in office
26	Kaarel Eenpalu's second cabinet	9 May 1938 – 12 October 1939	522
27	Jüri Uluots' cabinet	12 October 1939 – 21 June 1940	254
28	Otto Tief's cabinet (acting)	18 September 1944 – 25 September 1944	8

=== Cabinet-in exile ===
Number	Government	Term of office	Days in office
29	Johannes Sikkar's cabinet	12 January 1953 – 22 August 1960	2780
30	Aleksander Warma's cabinet	1 January 1962 – 29 March 1963	453
31	Tõnis Kint's cabinet	1 March 1964 – 8 May 1971	2625
32	Heinrich Mark's cabinet	8 May 1971 – 1 March 1990	6873
33	Enno Penno's cabinet	20 June 1990 – 7 October 1992	841

=== Restored Estonia ===
Number	Government	Term of office	Days in office
34	Edgar Savisaar's Interim cabinet	3 April 1990 – 29 January 1992	668
35	Tiit Vähi's first Interim cabinet	30 January 1992 – 21 October 1992	266
36	Mart Laar's first cabinet	21 October 1992 – 8 November 1994	749
37	Andres Tarand's cabinet	8 November 1994 – 17 April 1995	161
38	Tiit Vähi's first cabinet	17 April 1995 – 6 November 1995	204
39	Tiit Vähi's second cabinet	6 November 1995 – 17 March 1997	498
40	Mart Siimann's cabinet	17 March 1997 – 25 March 1999	739
41	Mart Laar's second cabinet	25 March 1999 – 28 January 2002	1041
42	Siim Kallas' cabinet	28 January 2002 – 10 April 2003	438
43	Juhan Parts' cabinet	10 April 2003 – 13 April 2005	735
44	Andrus Ansip's first cabinet	13 April 2005 – 5 April 2007	723
45	Andrus Ansip's second cabinet	5 April 2007 – 6 April 2011	1463
46	Andrus Ansip's third cabinet	6 April 2011 – 26 March 2014	1086
47	Taavi Rõivas' first cabinet	26 March 2014 – 9 April 2015	380
48	Taavi Rõivas' second cabinet	9 April 2015 – 23 November 2016	594
49	Jüri Ratas' first cabinet	23 November 2016 – 29 April 2019	886
50	Jüri Ratas' second cabinet	29 April 2019 – 26 January 2021	608
51	Kaja Kallas' first cabinet	26 January 2021 – 18 July 2022	537
52	Kaja Kallas' second cabinet	18 July 2022 – 17 April 2023	273
53	Kaja Kallas' third cabinet	17 April 2023 – 23 July 2024	463
54	Kristen Michal's cabinet	Incumbent	791

== Sources ==
- Estonica : State : Government:
- Previous cabinets
