= Kaja Kallas's second cabinet =

Government of Estonia from 2022 to 2023

- 52nd Cabinet of Estonia
- 2022-2023
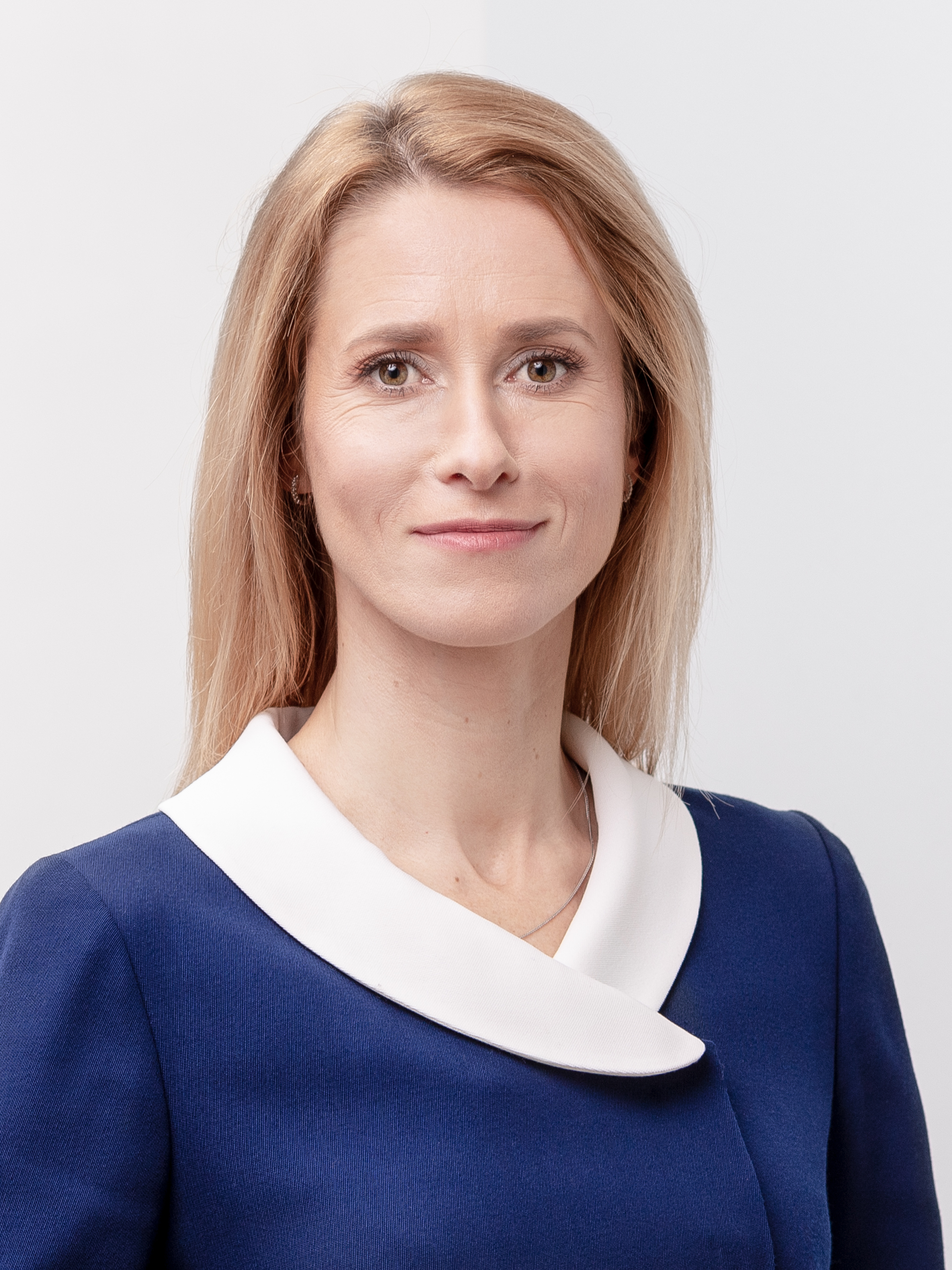
- Date formed: 18 July 2022
- Date dissolved: 17 April 2023

People and organisations
- Head of state: Alar Karis
- Head of government: Kaja Kallas
- No. of ministers: 15
- Total no. of members: 15
- Member parties: Reform; Isamaa; SDE
- Status in legislature: Majority cabinet
- Opposition parties: Centre; EKRE

History
- Election: 2019 election
- Predecessor: Kaja Kallas's first cabinet
- Successor: Kaja Kallas's third cabinet

The second cabinet of Kaja Kallas, (sometimes referred to as the Viljandi government (Estonian: Viljandi valitsus) due to the negotiations of the government coalition having taken place there) was the cabinet of Estonia from 18 July 2022 until 17 April 2023 when it was succeeded by the third Kallas cabinet following the 2023 election.

== Background ==
On 3 June 2022, Kaja Kallas dismissed Centre Party ministers from her first cabinet after several weeks of disputes between the two parties and the Centre Party voting with opposition against a government supported bill. Continuing with a minority cabinet, the Reform Party called up the conservative Isamaa and the Social Democrats for talks on a possible new coalition. On July 8, the three parties announced that they agreed on forming a new coalition government. Although law allows ministerial changes without cabinet resignation, Kallas stepped back so that the new coalition got to vote for the prime minister's mandate in the parliament. The new coalition was given a mandate by the Riigikogu on July 15 with a 52–26 vote. This is the fourth time in Estonian history when Reform Party, Isamaa and Social Democrats form the coalition, others being Laar's second cabinet, 1999–2002, Ansip's second cabinet 2007–2009 and Rõivas's second cabinet 2015–2016.

== Ministers ==
The coalition agreed on 14 ministers in addition to the prime minister with five each for Reform, Isamaa and the Social Democrats.

On 18 October 2022, Minister of Finance Keit Pentus-Rosimannus announced her resignation, leaving politics after 19-year career. She also declined return to parliament. On 19 October 2022, Annely Akkermann was appointed as a replacement for Pentus-Rosimannus.

Portfolio	Minister	Took office	Left office	Party
Government's Office
Prime Minister	Kaja Kallas	18 July 2022	to the next cabinet	Reform
Ministry of Finance
Minister of Finance	Keit Pentus-Rosimannus	18 July 2022	19 October 2022	Reform
Minister of Finance	Annely Akkermann	19 October 2022	17 April 2023	Reform
Minister of Public Administration	Riina Solman	18 July 2022	17 April 2023	Isamaa
Ministry of Foreign Affairs
Minister of Foreign Affairs	Urmas Reinsalu	18 July 2022	17 April 2023	Isamaa
Ministry of Economic Affairs and Communications
Minister of Economic Affairs and Infrastructure	Riina Sikkut	18 July 2022	17 April 2023	SDE
Minister of Entrepreneurship and Information Technology	Kristjan Järvan	18 July 2022	17 April 2023	Isamaa
Ministry of Justice
Minister of Justice	Lea Danilson-Järg	18 July 2022	17 April 2023	Isamaa
Ministry of Defence
Minister of Defence	Hanno Pevkur	18 July 2022	to the next cabinet	Reform
Ministry of Culture
Minister of Culture	Piret Hartman	18 July 2022	17 April 2023	SDE
Ministry of the Interior
Minister of the Interior	Lauri Läänemets	18 July 2022	to the next cabinet	SDE
Ministry of Education and Research
Minister of Education and Research	Tõnis Lukas	18 July 2022	17 April 2023	Isamaa
Ministry of the Environment
Minister of the Environment	Madis Kallas	18 July 2022	to the next cabinet	SDE
Ministry of Social Affairs
Minister of Health and Labour	Peep Peterson	18 July 2022	17 April 2023	SDE
Minister of Social Protection	Signe Riisalo	18 July 2022	to the next cabinet	Reform
Ministry of Rural Affairs
Minister of Rural Affairs	Urmas Kruuse	18 July 2022	17 April 2023	Reform

== See also ==
- Triple Alliance (Estonia)

Preceded by Kaja Kallas's first cabinet	Government of Estonia; 2022–2023	Succeeded by Kaja Kallas's third cabinet
