= Heiki Kranich =

Estonian politician (1961–2026)

Heiki Kranich (9 October 1961 – 13 January 2026) was an Estonian politician. He was a member of the Estonian parliament (Riigikogu) from 1992 to 1999 and from 2019 to 2023.

== Life and career ==
Kranich was born in 1961, in Haapsalu, then Soviet-occupied Estonia. In 1991, he graduated from the State University of Telecommunications in Leningrad (now Saint Petersburg, Russia) where he specialized in telecommunications engineering.

In 1994, he served as the Minister of Finance of Estonia in the first cabinet of prime minister Mart Laar and from 1999 to 2003 as the Minister of the Environment in the second cabinet of prime minister Mart Laar and the cabinet led by prime minister Siim Kallas.

Between 1983 and 1991, he worked as a mechanic and the head of the Haapsalu Division at the state-owned telephone network. From 1991 to 1992, he was head of the Haapsalu branch of the West Estonian Bank (Lääne-Eesti Pank).

Kranich was a founding member of the Estonian Liberal Democratic Party in 1990. After the Estonian Liberal Democratic Party merged into the Estonian Reform Party in 1994, Kranich remained a member of the merged party until his death in 2026. He served as Secretary General of the Estonian Reform Party from 1995 to 1999.

Kranich died on 13 January 2026, at the age of 64.
