= Kaja Kallas's third cabinet =

Government of Estonia from 2023 to 2024

- 53rd Cabinet of Estonia

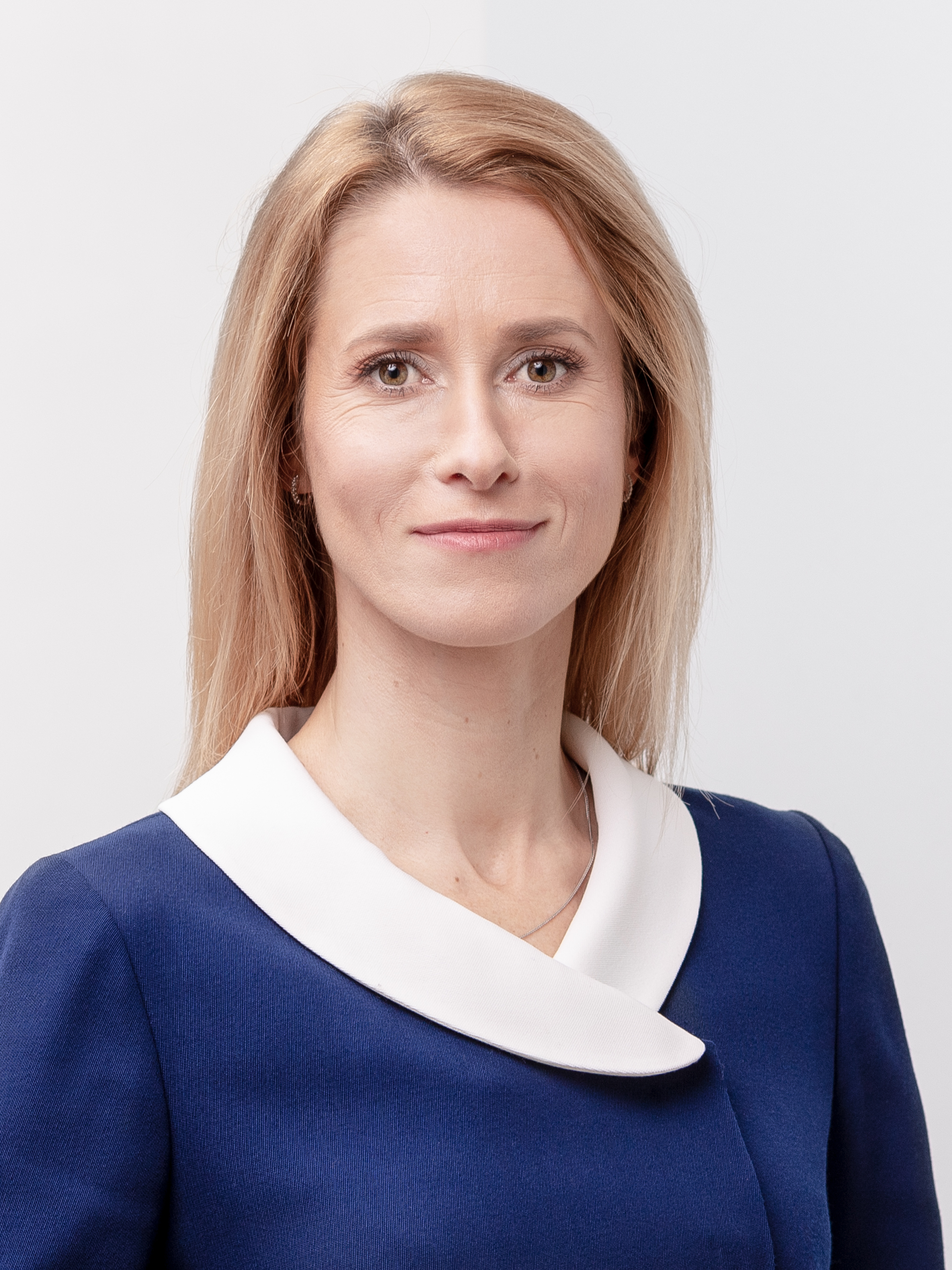
- Date formed: 17 April 2023
- Date dissolved: 23 July 2024

People and organisations
- Head of state: Alar Karis
- Head of government: Kaja Kallas
- No. of ministers: 13
- Total no. of members: 13
- Member parties: Reform; SDE; E200
- Status in legislature: Majority (coalition)
- Opposition parties: Isamaa; EKRE; Centre; ERK

History
- Election: 2023 election
- Predecessor: Kaja Kallas's second cabinet
- Successor: Kristen Michal's cabinet

The third cabinet of Kaja Kallas was the cabinet of Estonia from 17 April 2023 to 22 July 2024. The cabinet was formed following the 2023 parliamentary election. On 15 July 2024 Kaja Kallas, who had been chosen as nominee for High Representative of the Union for Foreign Affairs and Security Policy in the European Commission, submitted her resignation as Prime Minister, triggering the immediate resignation of her entire cabinet. The cabinet remained in place until the formation of Kristen Michal's cabinet on 22 July.

== Background ==
In the aftermath of the 2023 Estonian parliamentary election, the Reform Party increased their number of seats, and incumbent prime minister Kaja Kallas opted to open coalition negotiations with Estonia 200 and the Social Democrats on 7 March 2023. The decision was predicted by observers, who saw the possibility of a Reform–Estonia 200–SDE coalition as the most likely outcome of the election.

On 7 April, Lauri Läänemets, the leader of SDE, confirmed that the three parties had come to an agreement, and Kallas revealed the composition of her incoming cabinet the following day. On 10 April, the coalition agreement was signed between the three party leaders, and Kallas later became prime minister-designate following the approval of the coalition government by the Riigikogu on 12 April. Kallas and her third cabinet were sworn into office on 17 April.

== Ministers ==
The ministers of the cabinet were revealed by Kallas on 8 April 2023. The cabinet consists of 13 ministers, seven from the Reform Party (including the prime minister) and three each from Estonia 200 and the Social Democrats.

Portfolio	Minister	Took office	Left office	Party
Government's Office
Prime Minister	Kaja Kallas	17 April 2023	22 July 2024	Reform
Ministry of Finance
Minister of Finance	Mart Võrklaev	17 April 2023	22 July 2024	Reform
Ministry of Foreign Affairs
Minister of Foreign Affairs	Margus Tsahkna	17 April 2023	22 July 2024	Estonia 200
Ministry of Economic Affairs and Communications
Minister of Economic Affairs and Information Technology	Tiit Riisalo	17 April 2023	22 July 2024	Estonia 200
Ministry of Justice
Minister of Justice	Kalle Laanet	17 April 2023	1 April 2024	Reform
Minister of Justice	Madis Timpson	1 April 2024	22 July 2024	Reform
Ministry of Defence
Minister of Defence	Hanno Pevkur	17 April 2023	22 July 2024	Reform
Ministry of Culture
Minister of Culture	Heidy Purga	17 April 2023	22 July 2024	Reform
Ministry of the Interior
Minister of the Interior	Lauri Läänemets	17 April 2023	22 July 2024	SDE
Ministry of Education and Research
Minister of Education and Research	Kristina Kallas	17 April 2023	22 July 2024	Estonia 200
Ministry of Climate
Minister of Climate	Kristen Michal	17 April 2023	22 July 2024	Reform
Ministry of Social Affairs
Minister of Health	Riina Sikkut	17 April 2023	22 July 2024	SDE
Minister of Social Protection	Signe Riisalo	17 April 2023	22 July 2024	Reform
Ministry of Regional Affairs and Agriculture
Minister of Regional Affairs	Madis Kallas	17 April 2023	26 April 2024	SDE
Minister of Regional Affairs	Piret Hartman	26 April 2024	22 July 2024	SDE

Preceded by Kaja Kallas's second cabinet	Government of Estonia; 2023–2024	Succeeded by Kristen Michal's cabinet
