= Tiit Vähi's first cabinet =

Government of Estonia from January 1992 to October 1992

Tiit Vähi's first cabinet was in office in Estonia from 30 January 1992 to 22 October 1992, when it was succeeded by Mart Laar's first cabinet.

== Members ==
This cabinet's members were the following:

- Tiit Vähi – Prime Minister
- Robert Närska – Minister of Interior Affairs
- Lennart Meri – Minister of Foreign Affairs
- Heido Vitsur – Minister of Economic Affairs
- Märt Rask – Minister of Justice Affairs
- Aavo Mölder – Minister of Agricultural Affairs
- Jaan Kabin – Minister of Construction
- Ülo Uluots – Minister of Defense
- Andress Tamm – Minister of Trade
- Tõnis Kaasik – Minister of the Environment
- Andres Kork – Minister of Health
- Enn Sarap – Minister of Transport and Communications
- Aksel Treimann – Minister of Industry and Energy
- Arvo Kuddo - Minister of Labor
