= Ministry of Rural Affairs =

The Ministry of Rural Affairs may refer to:

- The Ministry of Rural Affairs (Estonia), alternative translation of an Estonian governmental organization
- The Ministry of Rural Affairs (Ontario), an Ontario government ministry
- The Ministry of Rural Affairs (Sweden), a former Swedish governmental organization
