= Andres Varik =

Estonian politician (born 1952)

Andres Varik (born 7 April 1952 in Põlva) 1997-1999 he was Minister of Rural Affairs. is an Estonian politician and agronomist. He has been a member of VIII and IX Riigikogu. 1997-1999 he was Minister of Rural Affairs.

From 1978 to 1989, he was a member of the Communist Party. Later, he joined the Estonian Country People's Party.
