= Tiit Tammsaar =

Estonian politician (born 1951)

Tiit Tammsaar (born 7 November 1951 in Rapla) is an Estonian politician. He has been a member of VIII, IX. X and XII Riigikogu. 2003-2004 he was Minister of Rural Affairs

He was a member of the People's Union of Estonia party.
