= Mändmets =

Family name

Mändmets is an Estonian-language surname.

People named Mändmets include:

- Jakob Mändmets (1871–1930), an Estonian writer and journalist
- Ilmar Mändmets (born 1944), an Estonian agronomist and politician
- Blythe Metz (born 1977), otherwise Blythe Mändmets, an American actress
