= Piret Hartman =

Estonian politician (born 1981)

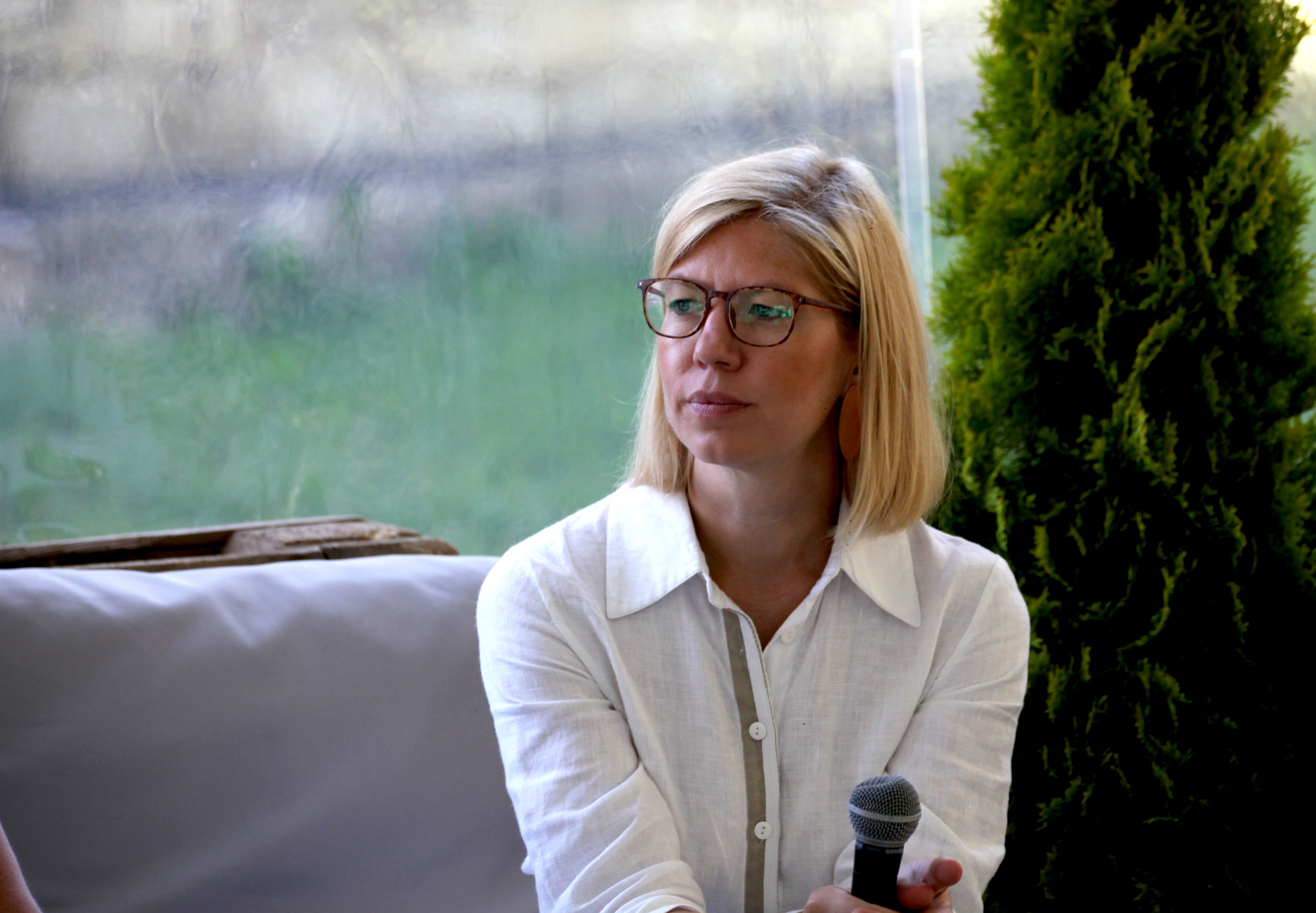
- Hartman in 2022

Minister of Culture
- In office 18 July 2022 – 17 April 2023
- Prime Minister: Kaja Kallas
- Preceded by: Tiit Terik
- Succeeded by: Heidy Purga

Minister of Regional Affairs and Agriculture
- In office 29 April 2024 – 11 March 2025
- Preceded by: Madis Kallas
- Succeeded by: Yoko Alender (acting)

Personal details
- Born: 10 August 1981 (age 45) Püssi, then part of Estonian SSR, Soviet Union
- Party: Social Democratic Party
- Education: Estonian University of Life Sciences; Tallinn University of Technology

Piret Hartman (born 10 August 1981) is an Estonian politician. She served as Minister of Culture in the second cabinet of Prime Minister Kaja Kallas.

Since 29 April 2024, she is serving as Minister of Regional Affairs in the third cabinet of Kaja Kallas, continuing the role of Minister of Regional Affairs and Agriculture in the cabinet of Kristen Michal .

Political offices
Preceded by Tiit Terik	Minister of Culture; 2022–2023	Succeeded by Heidy Purga
