= Hendrik Johannes Terras =

Estonian politician (born 1993)

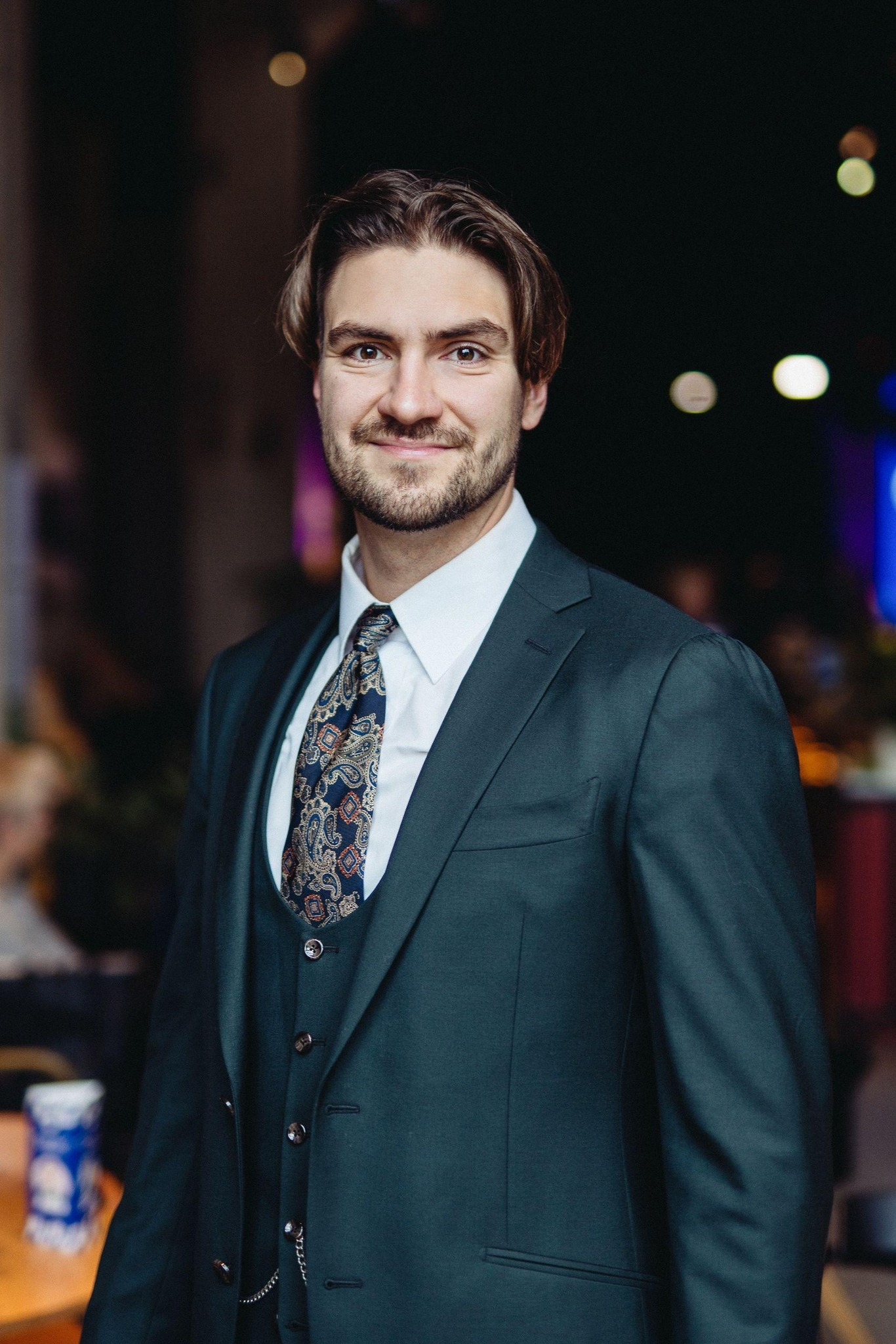
- Terras in 2022

Minister of Regional Affairs and Agriculture
- Incumbent
- Assumed office 25 March 2025
- Prime Minister: Kristen Michal
- Preceded by: Piret Hartman

Member of the Riigikogu
- Incumbent
- Assumed office 18 April 2023
- Constituency: No. 1

Personal details
- Born: 14 June 1993 (age 33) Tallinn, Estonia
- Party: Estonia 200
- Education: University of Tartu

Hendrik Johannes Terras (born 14 June 1993) is an Estonian politician, he is the current Minister of Regional Affairs and Agriculture (since 25 March 2025). He was previously a member of the XV Riigikogu.

Terras was prevoiuslly a member of the executive board of the Estonia 200 political party and a former chairman of the party's youth organisation.

== Biography ==
Terras was born in Tallinn. His father is a retired military general, politician Riho Terras. His mother Kaili Terras is a diplomat.

Terras is a graduate of the University of Tartu with a BA in Journalism and Communication (2017) and an MA degree in Communication Management (2019).

=== Political career ===
In 2022, Terras was the chairman of Noor Eesti 200 ("Young Estonia 200"), the youth organisation of the Estonia 200 party.

In the summer of 2022, while already active in politics, Hendrik Johannes Terras participated in a televised reality dating show, through which he gained his first broader public visibility. The appearance attracted significant media attention and led to public discussion about a possible connection to the upcoming 2023 Estonian parliamentary elections. Journalist and political analyst Alo Raun has argued that participation in the dating show may have harmed Terras’s public image and undermined his credibility as a politician. Terras has denied any connection between his participation in the dating show and the 2023 Estonian parliamentary election campaign.

In the autumn of 2022 he ran for the chairmanship of the Estonia 200 political party, and in a later stage withdrew his candidacy in favour of Lauri Hussar. On 15 October 2022, at the General Assembly, Terras was elected member of the executive board and vice-chairman of the party.

On 19 November 2022, Terras was elected a member of the executive board of Noor Eesti 200.

He ran for the Estonian parliament (Riigikogu) in the 2023 elections, received 771 votes in his constituency ( electoral district no. 1 covering Haabersti, Põhja-Tallinn and Kristiine) and was elected a member of parliament.

On 25 March 2025, he was sworn in as the Minister of Regional Affairs and Agriculture.
