= Estonian Liberal Democratic Party =

Estonian political party

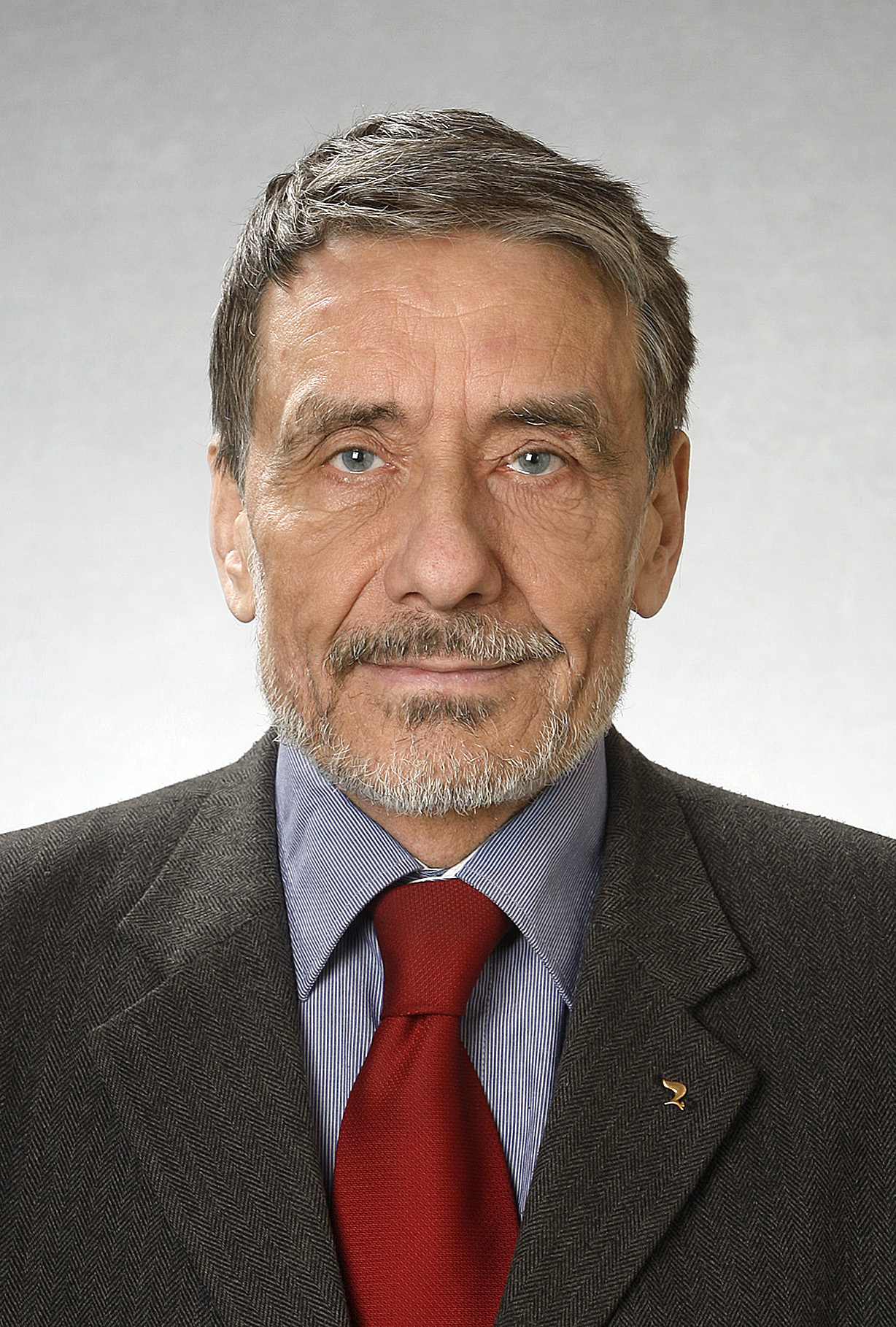
Paul-Eerik Rummo, leader of the Estonian Liberal Democratic Party

The Estonian Liberal Democratic Party (Estonian: Eesti Liberaaldemokraatlik Partei), abbreviated to ELDP, was a social liberal political party in Estonia that existed between 1990 and 1994. The ELDP was founded on 9 March 1990, during the Estonian Soviet Socialist Republic, by the merger of the Liberal People's Party and the Free Democratic Party.

The ELDP was granted observer membership of the Liberal International on 4 October 1990: the first eastern European party to be admitted to the LI. Led by Paul-Eerik Rummo, the party ran as part of the right-wing, radically pro-reform 'Fatherland' electoral alliance in the 1992 election, and won six of the bloc's 29 seats in the 101-seat Riigikogu. The party served, as with all of the Fatherland bloc, in the government of Mart Laar, with Rummo as Minister of Culture and Education and Heiki Kranich as Minister of Finance. Rummo and Kranich resigned from the government and the ELDP withdrew from the Fatherland group in parliament on 14 June 1993, when the party's proposal for a secret vote of no confidence in Laar was defeated.

The Liberal Democratic Party joined Siim Kallas' (then president of the Bank of Estonia) initiative group which gathered liberals hitherto uninvolved in politics, to form on 13 November 1994 the Estonian Reform Party.
