= Margo Miljand =

Estonian politician

Margo Miljand (born 8 July 1970, Põltsamaa) is an Estonian politician.

From 2011 to 2012, he was the chairman of People's Union of Estonia.
