= Kalev Lillo =

Estonian politician (born 1966)

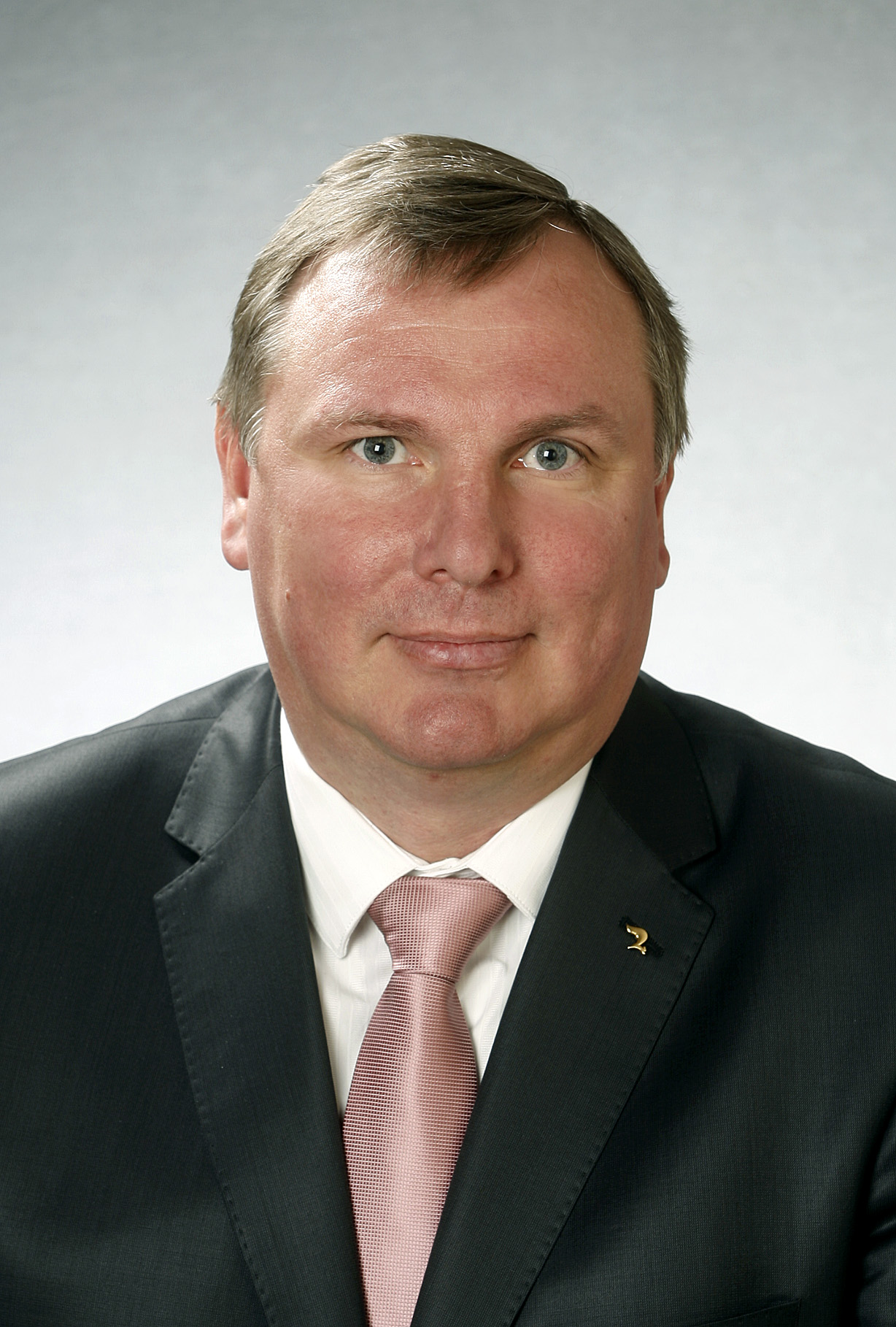
Kalev Lillo in 2011.

Kalev Lillo (born 30 November 1966 in Tartu) is an Estonian politician. He has been member of XII Riigikogu.

Lillo was the Deputy Mayor of Valga from 1995 until 1996 and the Mayor of Jõgeva from 1996 until 1999. He is a member of Estonian Reform Party.
