= Heidy Purga =

Estonian presenter, journalist and politician

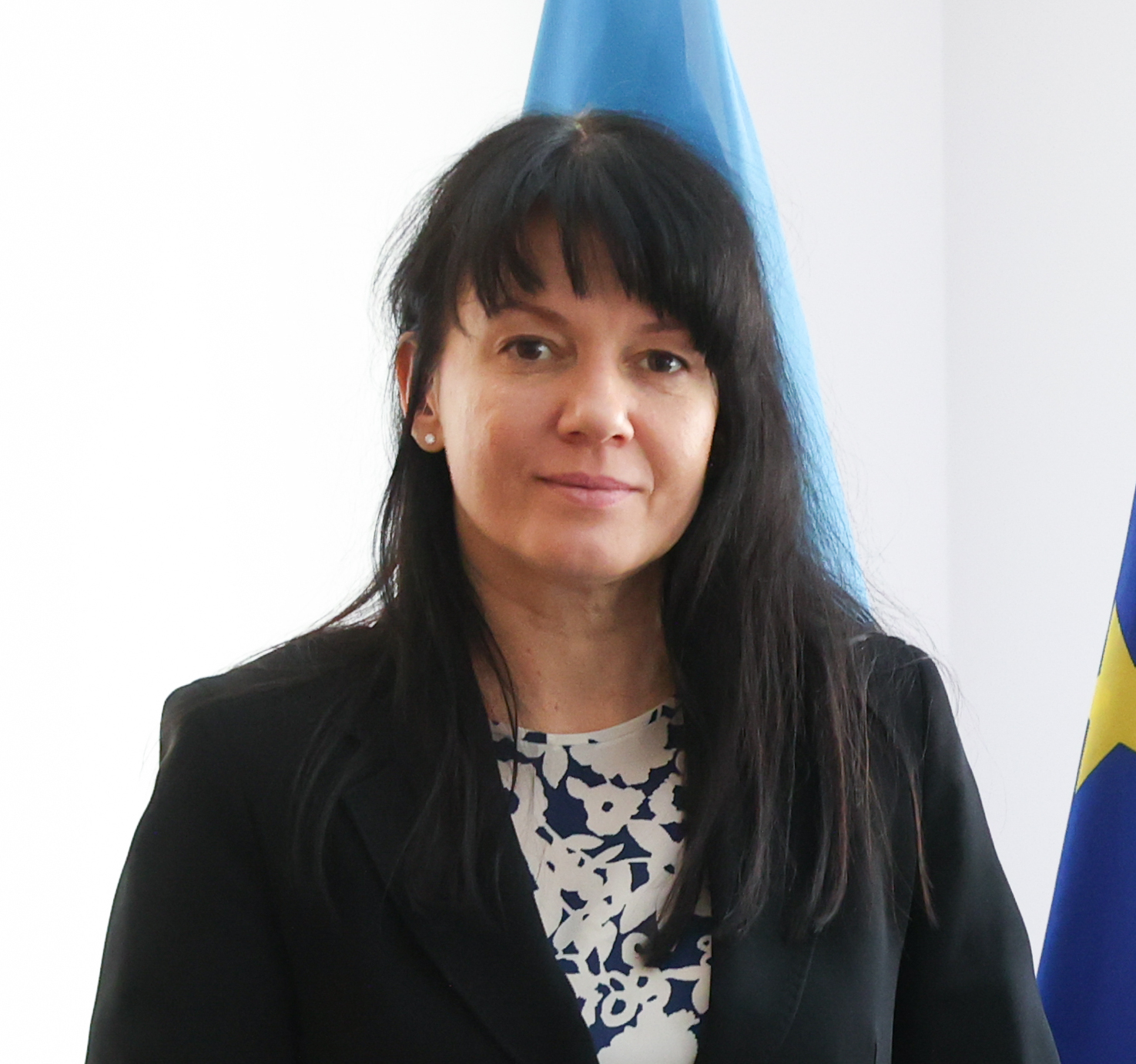
- Purga in 2025

Minister of Culture
- Incumbent
- Assumed office 17 April 2023
- Prime Minister: Kaja Kallas; Kristen Michal
- Preceded by: Piret Hartman

Personal details
- Born: 18 March 1975 (age 51) Tartu, Estonia
- Party: Reform
- Education: Tallinn University; Concordia International University Estonia

Heidy Purga (born 18 March 1975) is an Estonian radio and television presenter, television director, journalist and politician. She has been a member of the XIII Riigikogu and XIV Riigikogu.

Purga was sworn in as Minister of Culture in the third cabinet of Kaja Kallas on 17 April 2023.

From 1994 to 1996 she studied theatre director discipline at Tallinn University. In 2002 she graduated from Concordia International University Estonia with a degree in electronic media.

She has been the presenter, producer and editor of several television and radio channels. From 2008 to 2015 she was the producer for the song contest Eesti Laul.

Since 2014 she has been a member of Estonian Reform Party.
