= Liina Vahtras =

Estonian politician (born 1979)

Minister of Economy and Industry
- Incumbent
- Assumed office 16 September 2026
- Prime Minister: Kristen Michal
- Preceded by: Erkki Keldo

Personal details
- Born: 18 January 1979 (age 47) Kärdla, Hiiu County
- Party: Reform Party
- Education: University of Tartu; Tallinn University of Technology

Liina Vahtras (born 18 January 1979) is an Estonian civil servant, entrepreneur and politician serving as minister of economy and industry since 2026. From 2023 to 2026, she served as head of the e-residency department of the Estonian Business and Innovation Agency.

Vahtras received bachelor's degree in English language and literature from the University of Tartu in 2006. In 2018, she obtained a master's degree in e-government technologies and services from Tallinn University of Technology.
