= Tiit Terik =

Estonian politician

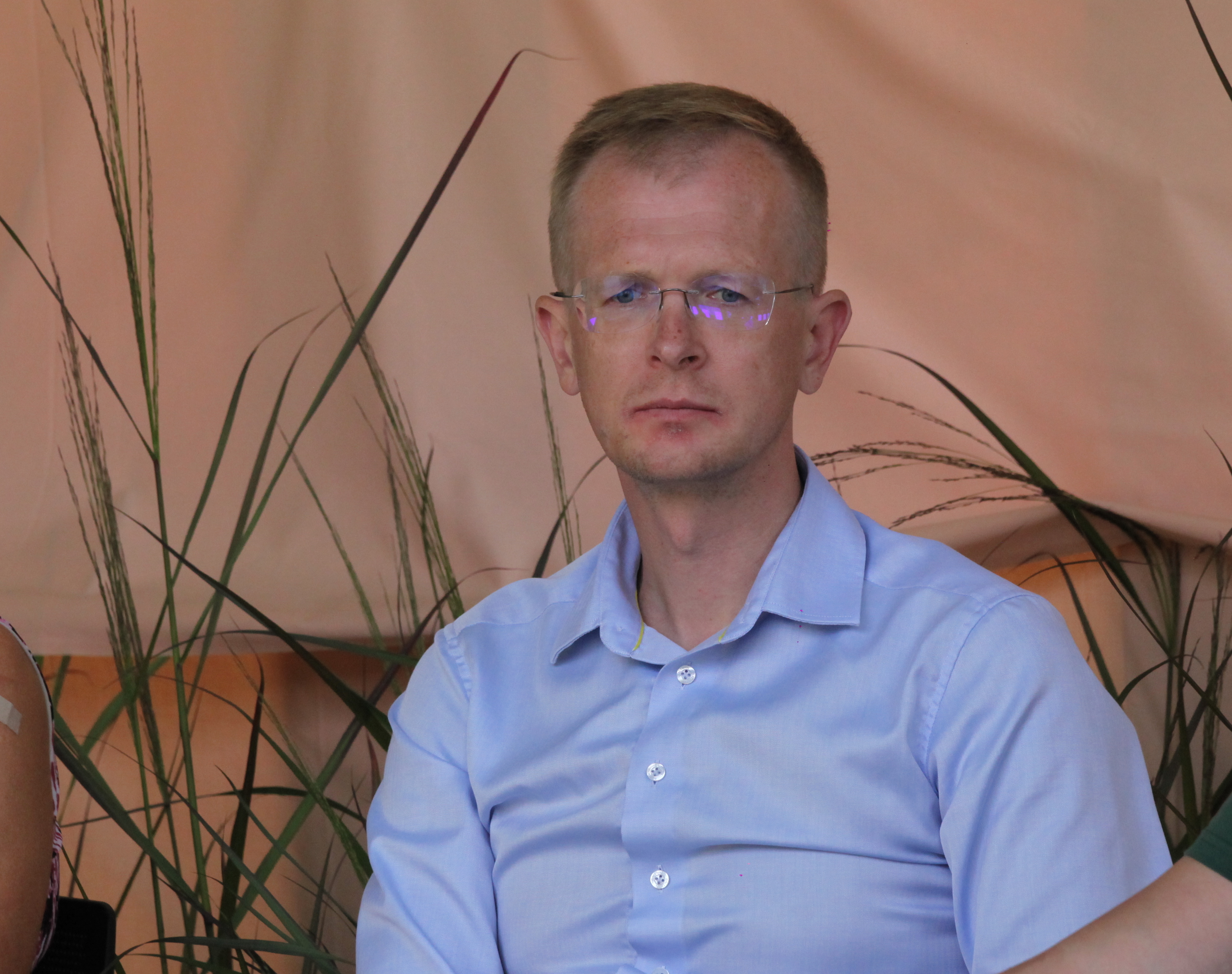
- Tiit Terik at Opinion Festival 2021 in Paide

Deputy Mayor of Tallinn

Personal details
- Born: 15 June 1979 (age 47) Tallinn
- Party: Estonian Centre Party

Tiit Terik (Estonian: [ˈtiːtˑ ˈterikˑ]; born 15 June 1979) is an Estonian politician. He is the former deputy mayor of Tallinn, responsible for coordinating the Tallinn City Property Department, Tallinn Municipal Police Department and managing issues within their areas of administration, as well as the Sports Division at Tallinn Culture and Sports Department. He is a member of the Estonian Centre Party (Estonian: Eesti Keskerakond). He served as Minister of Culture from 2021 to 2022, Vice-Chairman of the Tallinn City Council from 2022 to 2023, Chairman of the Tallinn City Council from 2019 to 2021, and chairman of the board of The Association of Estonian Cities and Municipalities. Terik is the member of the European Committee of the Regions and vice-president of the Council of European Municipalities and Regions (CEMR).

He was a member of the Estonian Parliament (2016-2019), City District Governor in the Nõmme District Administration (2013-2016) and City District Governor in the Pirita District Administration (2007-2013).

== Education ==
Terik studied social work at the Tallinn Pedagogical College. He earned a master's degree in government and administration from Tallinn University in 2015. In 2018 he took the Battalion Staff Officer course at the Estonian Military Academy. He had previously also taken National Defense courses.

== Career ==
Terik is also in the military, where he reached the rank of Second Lieutenant. He earned a Defence League Medal of Merits, III class.

He is a member of the Harju District of the Defence League since 2010. He was then elected multiple times to the Tallinn City Council (2009; 2013; 2017). He was also a member of the Parliamentary Assembly of the Council of Europe (2018-2019).

Political offices
Preceded by Anneli Ott	Minister of Culture; 2021–2022	Succeeded by Piret Hartman
