= Juhan Parts's cabinet =

Government of Estonia from 2003 to 2005

- Date formed: 10 April 2003
- Date dissolved: 13 April 2005

People and organisations
- Head of state: Arnold Rüütel
- Head of government: Juhan Parts
- Member party: Res Publica Party; Reform Party; People's Union of Estonia

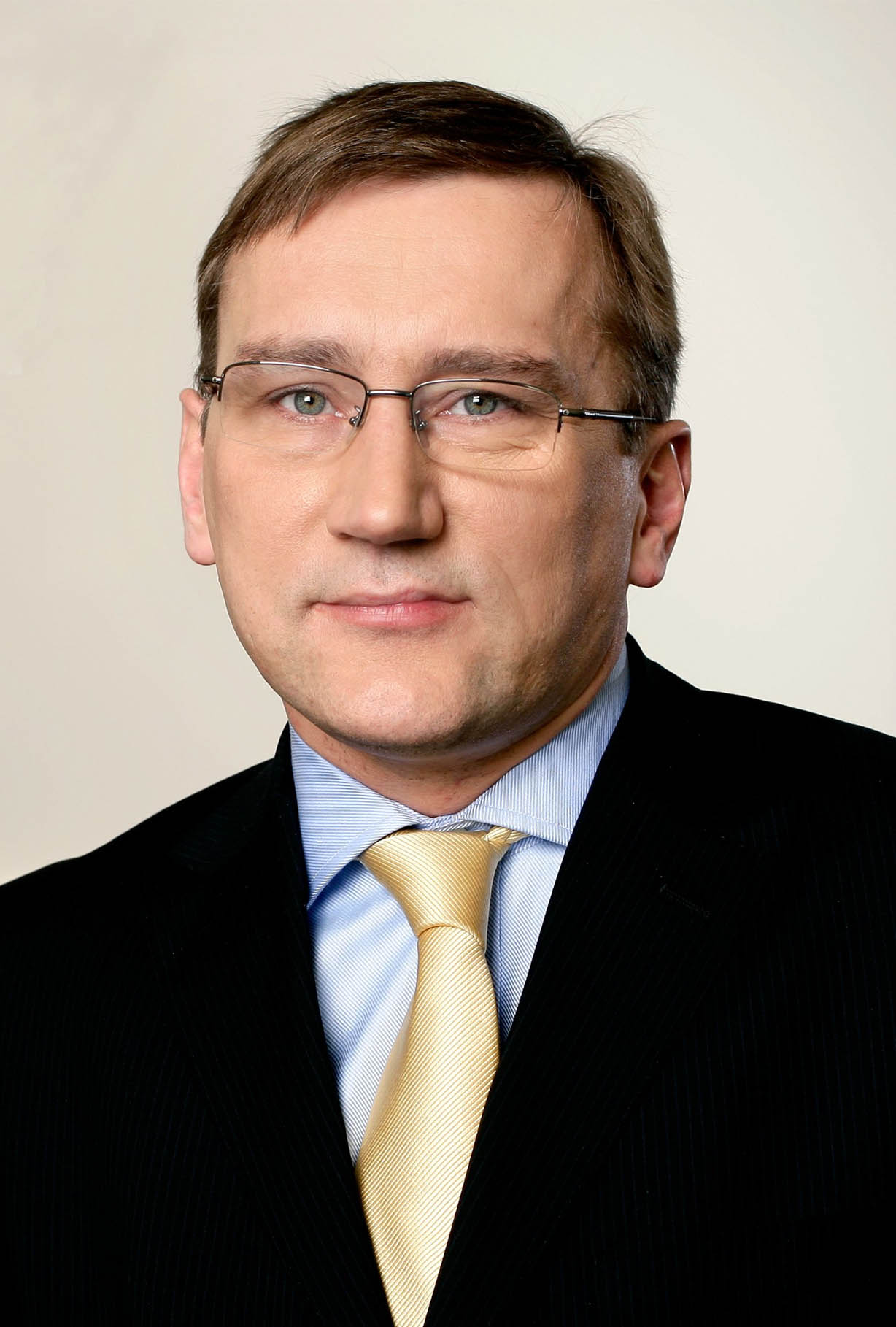
Juhan Parts

Juhan Parts's cabinet was in office in Estonia from 10 April 2003 to 13 April 2005, when it was succeeded by Andrus Ansip's first cabinet.

== Members ==
Juhan Parts's cabinet
Position	Name
Prime Minister	Juhan Parts
Minister of Interior Affairs	Margus Leivo
Minister of Foreign Affairs	Kristiina Ojuland
Minister of Justice	Ken-Marti Vaher
Minister of Economic Affairs and Communications	Meelis Atonen
