= Aavo Mölder =

Estonian politician (born 1944)

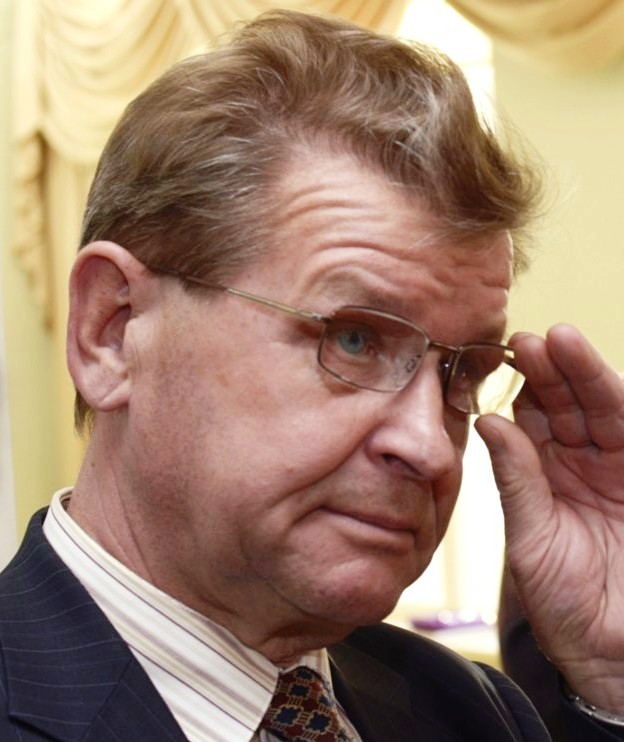
Aavo Mölder

Aavo Mölder (born 30 March 1944 in Vasula) is an Estonian agricultural scientist and politician. He was a member of VIII Riigikogu. From 19 February 1992 to 22 November 1992, he served as the Minister of Agriculture of the Republic of Estonia.
