= Jaan Leetsar =

Estonian politician (1946–2026)

Minister of Agriculture
- In office 1992–1994

Member of the VII Riigikogu

Personal details
- Born: 3 April 1946 Põltsamaa, Estonia
- Died: 17 January 2026 (aged 79)

Jaan Leetsar (3 April 1946 – 17 January 2026) was an Estonian politician. He was a member of VII Riigikogu. From 1992 to 1994, he was Minister of Agriculture. Born in Põltsamaa on 3 April 1946, he died on 17 January 2026, at the age of 79.
