= Kuldar Leis =

Estonian politician (born 1968)

Minister of Infrastructure
- Incumbent
- Assumed office 25 March 2025
- Prime Minister: Kristen Michal
- Preceded by: Vladimir Svet

Personal details
- Born: 29 May 1968 (age 57) Tartu Estonia

Kuldar Leis (born 29 May 1968) is an Estonian politician serving as minister of infrastructure since 2025. From 2017 to 2020, he served as chairman of Operail. From 2013 to 2017, he served as chairman of the Põlva Parish council.

Leis was born in Tartu. He is a 1987 graduate of the Õisu Technical School of Food Industry, with a degree in dairy technology. In 1993, he graduated from the University of Tartu in 1993, with a degree in financing and loans. He is married, and has three children.

In 2020, Leis was awarded the Order of the White Star, IV Class.
