= University Nord =

Private university in Estonia

University Nord (Estonian: Akadeemia Nord) was a private university in Tallinn, Estonia, established in 1991. In 2010, it joined the University of Tallinn.

== See also ==
- List of universities in Estonia
