= Ilmar Mändmets =

Estonian agronomist and politician

- Born: 30 April 1944; Mõisaküla
- Died: 6 December 2015 (aged 71)
- Occupation(s): agronomist and politician

Ilmar Mändmets (30 April 1944 – 6 December 2015) was an Estonian agronomist and politician. He was a member of VII Riigikogu. 1995–1997, he was Minister of Agriculture.
