= Mart Laar's second cabinet =

Government of Estonia from 1999 to 2002

Mart Laar's second cabinet was a coalition government between the Pro Patria Union, Reform Party and Moderate People's Party in office in Estonia from 25 March 1999 to 28 January 2002, when it was succeeded by Siim Kallas' cabinet. This was the first Triple Alliance government in Estonian history and usually the standard bearer of the nickname.

By late 2001, scandals related to the privatization of state-owned enterprises had made the government unpopular, and relations between the Pro Patria Union and the Reform Party deteriorated. When December 2001 the Reform Party entered a coalition with the Centre Party in Tallinn, as a result of which Edgar Savisaar became the mayor, Prime Minister Mart Laar decided to resign, as he felt that the national level government had essentially collapsed.

== Ministers ==
The cabinet featured the following people:

Portfolio	Minister	Took office	Left office	Party
Government's Office
Prime Minister	Mart Laar	25 March 1999	28 January 2002	Pro Patria Union
Ministry of Education
Minister of Education	Tõnis Lukas	25 March 1999	28 January 2002	Pro Patria Union
Ministry of Justice
Minister of Justice	Märt Rask	25 March 1999	28 January 2002	Reform
Ministry of Defence
Minister of Defence	Jüri Luik	25 March 1999	28 January 2002	Pro Patria Union
Ministry of Environment
Minister of Environment	Heiki Kranich	25 March 1999	28 January 2002	Reform
Ministry of Culture
Minister of Culture	Signe Kivi	25 March 1999	28 January 2002	Reform
Ministry of Economic Affairs
Minister of Economic Affairs	Mihkel Pärnoja	25 March 1999	5 October 2001	Moderates
Minister of Economic Affairs	Henrik Hololei	15 October 2001	28 January 2002	Moderates
Ministry of Agriculture
Minister of Agriculture	Ivari Padar	25 March 1999	28 January 2002	Moderates
Ministry of Finance
Minister of Finance	Siim Kallas	25 March 1999	28 January 2002	Reform
Ministry of the Interior
Minister of the Interior	Jüri Mõis	25 March 1999	5 November 1999	Pro Patria Union
Minister of the Interior	Tarmo Loodus	9 November 1999	28 January 2002	Pro Patria Union
Ministry of Social Affairs
Minister of Social Affairs	Eiki Nestor	25 March 1999	28 January 2002	Moderates
Ministry of Roads and Connections
Minister of Roads and Connections	Toivo Jürgenson	25 March 1999	28 January 2002	Pro Patria Union
Ministry of Foreign Affairs
Minister of Foreign Affairs	Toomas Hendrik Ilves	25 March 1999	28 January 2002	Moderates
Office of the Minister of Population
Minister of Population	Katrin Saks	25 March 1999	28 January 2002	Moderates
Office of the Minister of Regional Affairs
Minister of Regional Affairs	Toivo Asmer	25 March 1999	28 January 2002	Reform

== See also ==
- Triple Alliance (Estonia)
