= Vladimir Svet =

Estonian politician (born 1992)

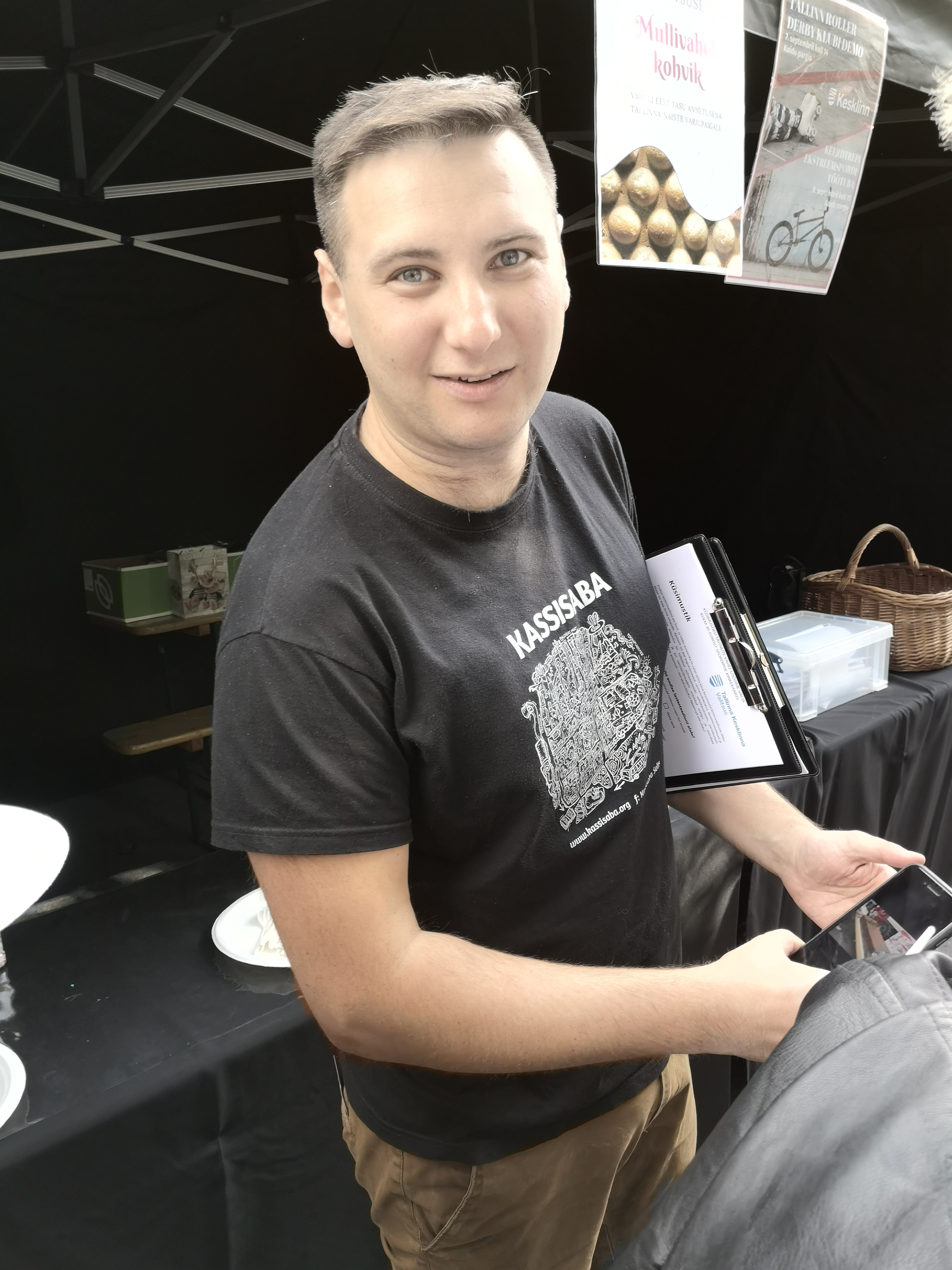
- Svet in 2019

Minister of Infrastructure
- In office 23 July 2024 – 10 March 2025
- Prime Minister: Kristen Michal
- Preceded by: Office established
- Succeeded by: Jürgen Ligi (Acting)

Personal details
- Born: 11 March 1992 (age 34)
- Party: Social Democratic Party (since 2024)
- Other political affiliations: Estonian Centre Party (2011–2016; 2018–2024)

Vladimir Svet (born 11 March 1992) is an Estonian politician who served as minister of infrastructure from 2024 until 2025. From 2021 to 2024, he served as deputy mayor of Tallinn.
