= Tõnis Kaasik =

Estonian politician

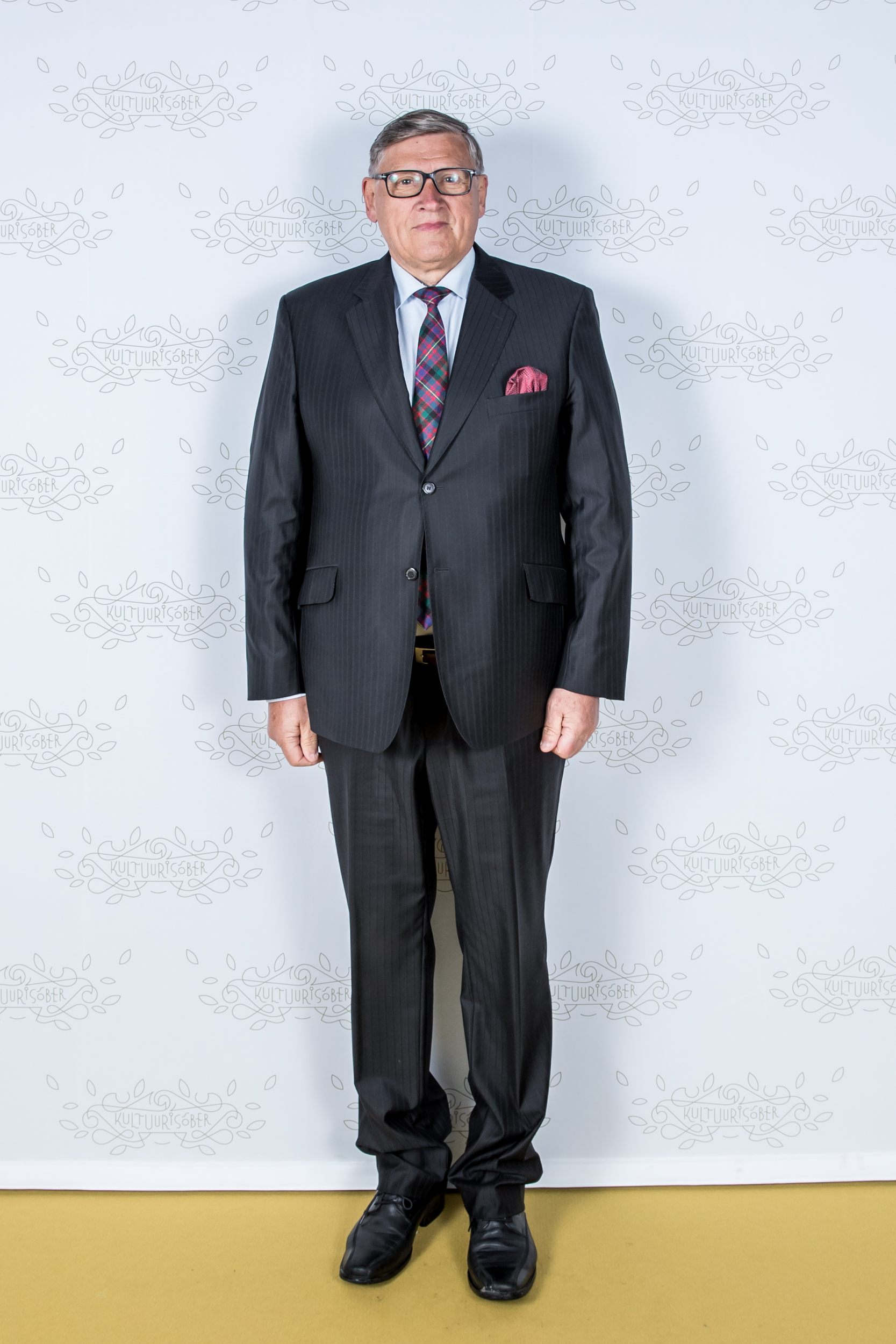
Tõnis Kaasik in 2019.

Tõnis Kaasik (born 9 January 1949 in Tallinn) is an Estonian entrepreneur, fencer, environmentalist and conservationist, and politician.

In 1966 and 1968, Kaasik was the Estonian SSR sabre fencing team champion. From 2004 until 2013, he was the President of the Estonian Fencing Association and from 2005 until 2013, he was a member of the representative body of the Estonian Olympic Committee. From 1991 until 1992, he was Minister of the Environment.
