= Mart Laar's first cabinet =

Government of Estonia from 1992 to 1994

Mart Laar's first cabinet was in office in Estonia from 22 October 1992 to 8 November 1994, when it was succeeded by Andres Tarand's cabinet.

== Members ==
This cabinet's members were the following:

Name	Portrait	Position
Mart Laar		Prime Minister
Lagle Parek		Minister of the Interior
Trivimi Velliste		Minister of Foreign Affairs
Ain Saarmann		Minister of Economic Affairs
Kaido Kama		Minister of Justice
Jaan Leetsaar		Minister of Agricultural Affairs
Andi Meister		Minister of Roads and Communications
Paul-Eerik Rummo		Minister of Culture and Education
