= Siim Kallas's cabinet =

Government of Estonia from 2002 to 2003

- Date formed: 28 January 2002
- Date dissolved: 10 April 2003

People and organisations
- Head of state: Arnold Rüütel
- Head of government: Siim Kallas
- Member party: Reform Party; Centre Party

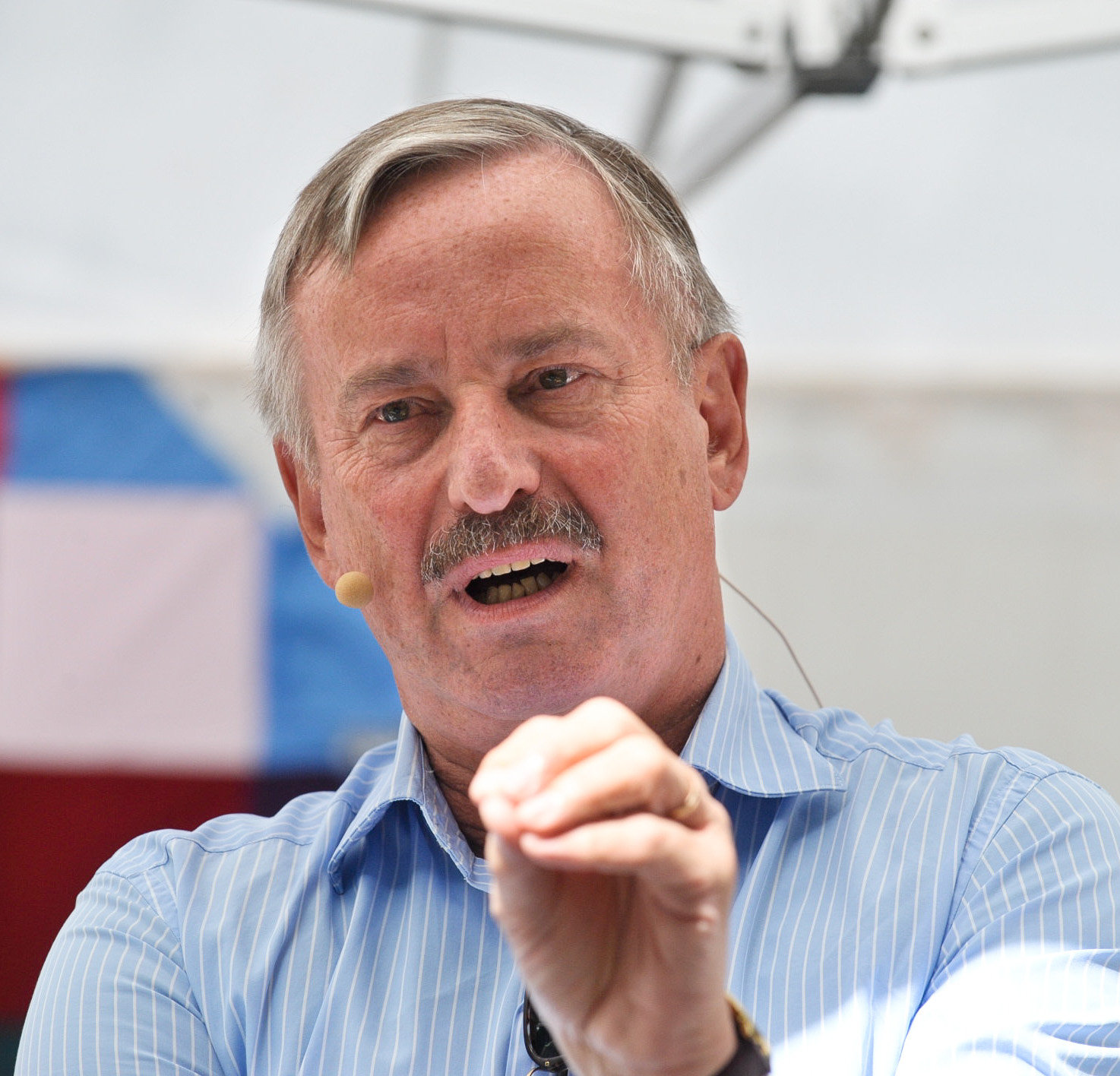
Siim Kallas

Siim Kallas's cabinet was in office in Estonia from 28 January 2002 to 10 April 2003, when it was succeeded by Juhan Parts's cabinet.

== Members ==
Siim Kallas's cabinet
Position	Name
Prime Minister	Siim Kallas
Minister of Interior Affairs	Ain Seppik
Minister of Foreign Affairs	Kristiina Ojuland
Minister of Justice	Märt Rask
Minister of Economic Affairs and Communications	Liina Tõnisson
