= Madis Kallas =

Estonian decathlete

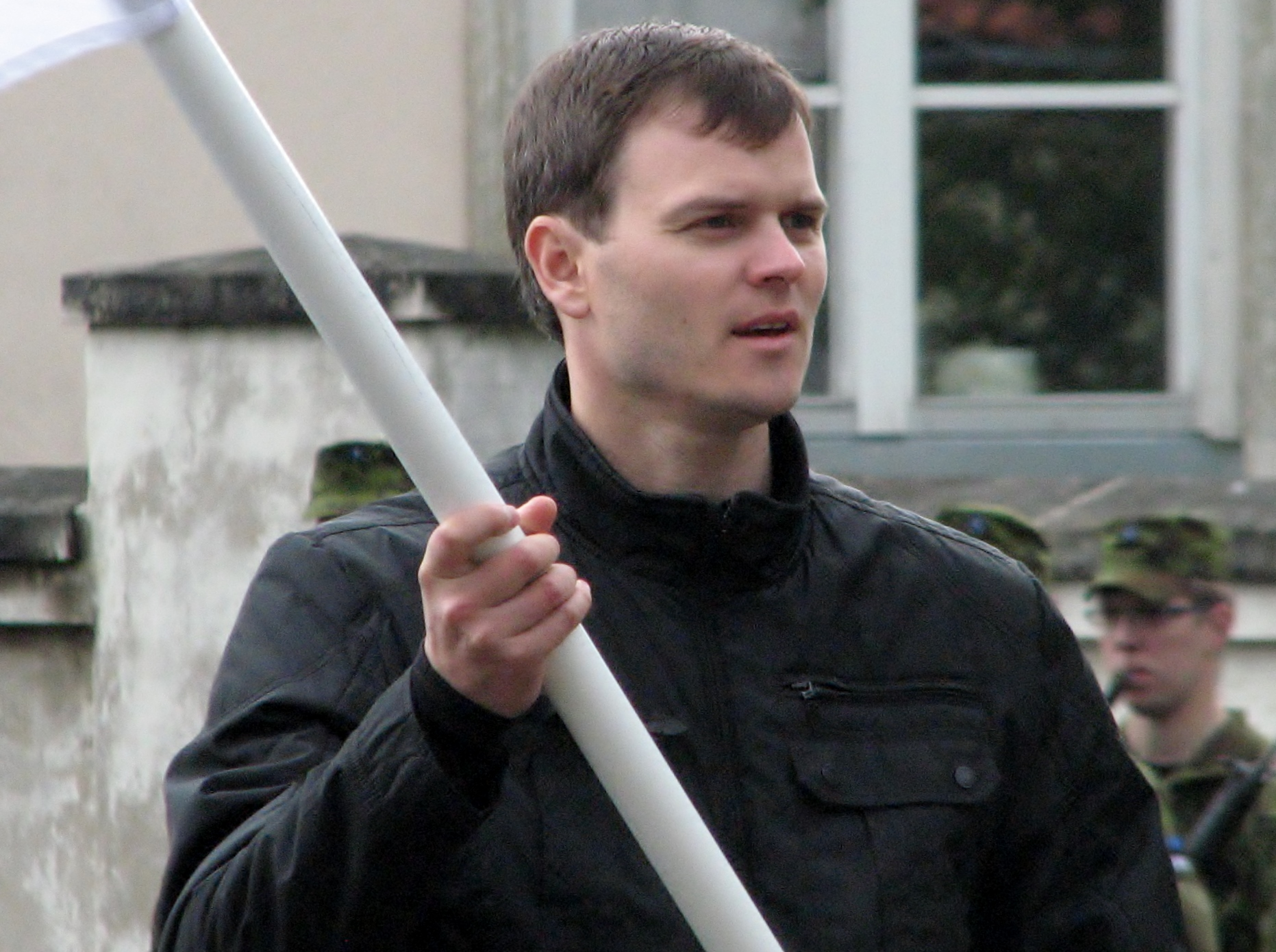
- Kallas in 2014

Minister of Regional and Rural Affairs
- In office 17 April 2023 – 16 April 2024
- Prime Minister: Kaja Kallas
- Preceded by: Urmas Kruuse
- Succeeded by: Lauri Läänemets (caretaker)

Minister of the Environment
- In office 18 July 2022 – 17 April 2023
- Prime Minister: Kaja Kallas
- Preceded by: Erki Savisaar
- Succeeded by: Kristen Michal

Personal details
- Born: 22 April 1981 (age 45) Kuressaare, then part of Estonian SSR, Soviet Union
- Party: Social Democratic
- Sports career
- Height: 189 cm (6 ft 2 in)
- Weight: 82 kg (181 lb)

Madis Kallas (born 22 April 1981) is an Estonian decathlete and politician, who currently serves as the Minister of the Environment of Estonia. He was the mayor of Saaremaa Municipality from 2017 to 2020 and again from 2021 to 2022.

Kallas was sworn in as Minister of Regional and Rural Affairs in the third cabinet of Kaja Kalla on 17 April 2023.

Kallas' political roles include Minister of Regional and Rural Affairs (2023–2024) — from 17 April 2023 to 16 April 2024, Minister of the Environment (2022–2023) — from 18 July 2022 to 17 April 2023, Mayor of Saaremaa Municipality — Served two terms: 2017–2020 and 2021–2022, Mayor of Kuressaare (2015–2017) and Deputy Mayor (2013–2015) and Adviser at Saare County Government (2010–2013).

== Achievements ==
| Year | Tournament | Venue | Points | Rank | Event |
|---|---|---|---|---|---|
| 2006 | European Championships | Gothenburg, Sweden | 7503 | 17 | Decathlon |
