= Tiit Vähi's second cabinet =

Government of Estonia from April 1995 to November 1995

Tiit Vähi's second cabinet was in office in Estonia from 17 April 1995 to 6 November 1995, when it was succeeded by Tiit Vähi's third cabinet.

== Members ==
This cabinet's members were the following:

- Tiit Vähi – Prime Minister
- Edgar Savisaar – Minister of Interior Affairs
- Riivo Sinijärv – Minister of Foreign Affairs
- Paul Varul – Minister of Justice
- Liina Tõnisson – Minister of Economic Affairs
