= Andres Tarand's cabinet =

Government of Estonia from 1994 to 1995

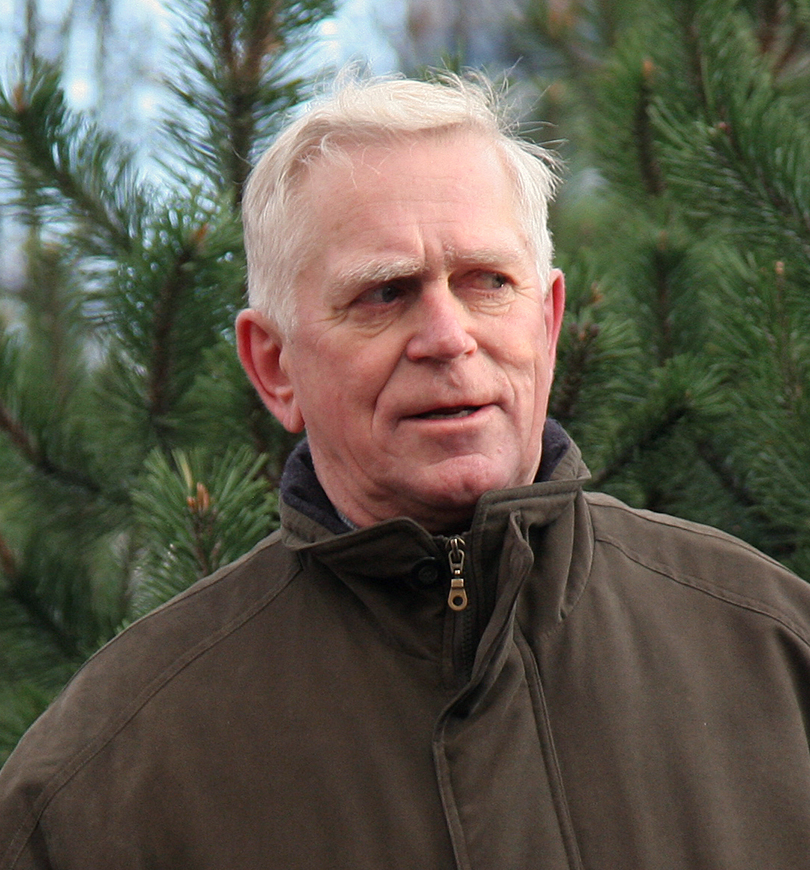

Andres Tarand's cabinet was in office in Estonia from 8 November 1994 to 17 April 1995, when it was succeeded by Tiit Vähi's second cabinet.

== Members ==
This cabinet's members were the following:

- Andres Tarand – Prime Minister
- Kaido Kama – Minister of Interior Affairs
- Jüri Luik – Minister of Foreign Affairs
- Jüri Adams – Minister of Justice
- Toivo Jürgenson – Minister of Economic Affairs
