= Andrus Ansip's cabinet =

Government of Estonia from 2005 to 2007

Andrus Ansip is the former Prime Minister of Estonia who formed three consecutive cabinets.

== The first cabinet ==
Ansip's first cabinet took office on 12 April 2005 after being approved by Riigikogu by 53 members out of 101. His cabinet was formed with pragmatic calculations, as it consisted of ministers from free market liberal Reform Party of Estonia, populist and personalist Estonian Centre Party and agrarian People's Union of Estonia. Reform Party and People's Union had participated in the previous government led by Juhan Parts (of conservative Res Publica).

Parts resigned on 24 March 2005 after his Minister of Justice Ken-Marti Vaher (also member of Res Publica Party) was sacked by Riigikogu.

== The second cabinet ==
The second cabinet of Andrus Ansip was approved by the Riigikogu on 5 April 2007, and it consisted of representatives of the Estonian Reform Party, Union of Pro Patria and Res Publica and Social Democratic Party.

As in the dire economic situation the government turned out incapable to solve the problem of required budget cuts the Social Democratic Party left from the coalition on 21 May 2009 and its three ministers were relieved from their posts. Coalition talks with the People's Union of Estonia were derailed on 1 June 2009 by councils of the People's Union and of the Union of Pro Patria and Res Publica. Therefore, from 4 June 2009 the cabinet continued as a minority cabinet.

== The third cabinet ==
The third cabinet of Andrus Ansip was approved by the Riigikogu on 6 April 2011, and it consisted of representatives of the Estonian Reform Party and Union of Pro Patria and Res Publica.
