= Tiit Vähi's third cabinet =

Government of Estonia from 1995 to 1997

Tiit Vähi's third cabinet was in office in Estonia from 6 November 1995 to 17 March 1997, when it was succeeded by Mart Siimann's cabinet.

== Members ==
This cabinet's members were the following:

- Tiit Vähi – Prime Minister
- Märt Rask – Minister of Interior Affairs
- Siim Kallas – Minister of Foreign Affairs
- Paul Varul – Minister of Justice
- Andres Lipstok – Minister of Economic Affairs
