= Mart Siimann's cabinet =

Government of Estonia from 1997 to 1998

Mart Siimann's cabinet was in office in Estonia from 17 March 1997 to 25 March 1999, when it was succeeded by Mart Laar's second cabinet.

== Members ==
This cabinet's members were the following:

- Mart Siimann – Prime Minister
- Riivo Sinijärv – Minister of Interior Affairs
- Toomas Hendrik Ilves – Minister of Foreign Affairs
- Paul Varul – Minister of Justice
- Jaak Leimann – Minister of Economic Affairs
