= Ministry of Culture (Estonia) =

Government ministry of Estonia

- Eesti Kultuuriministeerium

Ministry overview
- Formed: 27 April 1953; 73 years ago
- Jurisdiction: Government of Estonia
- Headquarters: Suur-Karja 23 15076, Tallinn
- Annual budget: €364 million (2023)
- Minister responsible: Heidy Purga, Minister of Culture
- Website: www.kul.ee

The Ministry of Culture of Estonia (Estonian: Eesti Kultuuriministeerium) is a Cabinet-level governmental agency in Estonia in charge of conducting and organising the country's cultural affairs and policies.

== Structure of the ministry ==
The ministry is headed by the minister who interacts with undersecretaries on Fine Arts, Cultural Heritage, International Relations and Cultural Diversity, and Sports. The ministry is responsible for creating favorable legislative and financial conditions for promotion and development of Estonian culture, its heritage, and sports.

The areas the Ministry of Culture is responsible for are:

- Literature and publishing
- Theatre
- Music
- Fine arts
- Cinema
- Folk art
- Museums
- Libraries
- Cultural heritage
- Creative industries
- Broadcasting and audiovisual policy
- Copyright and neighboring rights
- Cultural diversity and integration
- Sports

== List of ministers of culture ==
#	Name	Took office	Left office	Party
1	Jaak Allik	1 January 1996	25 March 1999	Estonian Coalition Party
2	Signe Kivi	25 March 1999	29 August 2002	Estonian Reform Party
3	Margus Allikmaa	3 September 2002	10 April 2003	Estonian Reform Party
4	Urmas Paet	10 April 2003	13 April 2005	Estonian Reform Party
5	Raivo Palmaru	13 April 2005	5 April 2007	Estonian Centre Party
6	Laine Jänes	5 April 2007	6 April 2011	Estonian Reform Party
7	Rein Lang	6 April 2011	4 December 2013	Estonian Reform Party
8	Urve Tiidus	4 December 2013	9 April 2015	Estonian Reform Party
9	Indrek Saar	9 April 2015	29 April 2019	Social Democratic Party
10	Tõnis Lukas	29 April 2019	26 January 2021	Pro Patria
11	Anneli Ott	26 January 2021	3 November 2021	Estonian Centre Party
12	Tiit Terik	8 November 2021	3 June 2022	Estonian Centre Party
13	Piret Hartman	18 July 2022	17 April 2023	Social Democratic Party
14	Heidy Purga	17 April 2023	Incumbent	Estonian Reform Party

== See also ==
- Cabinet of Estonia
- Culture of Estonia
