= Ministry of Education and Research (Estonia) =

Government ministry of Estonia

Agency overview
- Jurisdiction: Government of Estonia
- Headquarters: Munga 18 50088 Tartu, Estonia
- Annual budget: €1 billion (2023)
- Minister responsible: Kristina Kallas, Minister of Education and Research
- Website: Official website

The Ministry of Education and Research (Estonian: Haridus- ja Teadusministeerium) is a government ministry of Estonia, responsible for the planning and carrying out education, research, youth, and language policies, developing the national curricula and other educational standards and performing state supervision over the compliance of national curricula and other educational standards and educational institutions. Its head office is in Tartu and it also maintains offices in the capital, Tallinn. The current Minister of Education and Research is Kristina Kallas.

== See also ==
- Minister of Education and Research
