= People's Union of Estonia =

Estonian political party

People's Union of Estonia Eestimaa Rahvaliit
- Leader: Margo Miljand
- Founded: 29 September 1994 (EME)
- Dissolved: 24 March 2012
- Merged into: Conservative People's Party of Estonia
- Headquarters: Pärnu mnt. 30-6; Tallinn 10141
- Ideology: Agrarianism; Social conservatism
- Political position: Centre to centre-left
- European affiliation: Alliance for Europe of the Nations (2002–2009)
- Colours: Blue, Gold

Website
- http://www.erl.ee

The People's Union of Estonia (Estonian: Eestimaa Rahvaliit) was a political party in Estonia. Its last leader was Margo Miljand.

In the 2003 parliamentary election, the party collected 64,463 votes, which made 13.0% share of all votes and 13 mandates out of 101. In 2007's election, this dropped to 39,211 votes (7.1% of the total, a drop of 5.9%), and six seats in the Riigikogu, a loss of 7. It has dropped from fourth to sixth place among parties, having been bested by the Social Democratic Party and (narrowly) by the Greens.

== History ==
The party was founded on 29 September 1994 in Tallinn under the name of Estonian Country People's Party (Eesti Maarahva Erakond, EME). On 18 October 1999 the party was renamed to People's Union of Estonia. On 10 June 2000 the People's Union merged with the Estonian Country Union (Eesti Maaliit, EML) and with the Estonian Party of Pensioners and Families (Eesti Pensionäride ja Perede Erakond, EPPE), becoming the largest political party in Estonia. Another merger with the New Estonia Party (Erakond Uus Eesti) in 2003 resulted in further growth of membership. In 2010, there were more than 9,000 official members in the People's Union of Estonia.

The People's Union of Estonia was an agrarian party with populist, social democratic influences. Consequently, the party experienced difficulties in gaining wider support in cities and big towns. The last couple of years brought along some changes. The representation of the People's Union in towns (including the capital Tallinn) grew and they started to work on involving Russian-speaking minority in political activities. Russian Association of the People's Union was founded in 2005. The People's Union had a youth organisation called the Youth of the People's Union (Rahvaliidu Noored), which had approximately 3000 members.

On the European level the People's Union was a member of the Alliance for Europe of the Nations, but did not have any representatives in the European Parliament. The official organ of the Union was The Caring Estonia (Hooliv Eesti).

The first Chairman of the party was the previous President of the Republic of Estonia, Arnold Rüütel. On 10 June 2000 Villu Reiljan became the new Chairman of the People's Union. He served also as the Minister of Environment when the People’s Party participated in the Reform Party’s coalition government.

The Union was a member of Estonian government coalitions from 1995 to 1999 and from 2003 to 2007. From 2003 to 2005 they were in government together with the Estonian Reform Party and the Union for the Republic - Res Publica. Following a vote of no confidence against the government of Prime Minister Juhan Parts and Parts' subsequent resignation from the post of Prime Minister, they took part in formation of the new coalition where Res Publica was replaced with the Estonian Centre Party (see Andrus Ansip's cabinet).

In 2003 Estonian parliamentary election the party collected 64,463 votes, which made 13% share of all votes and 13 mandates out of 101. In comparison with previous election in 1999 they gained 6 additional seats in the Estonian Parliament. The representation of the party grew to 16 seats in 2005 when Toomas Alatalu, Robert Lepikson and Jaanus Marrandi, former members of the Estonian Centre Party decided to join the People's Union. After Robert Lepikson's death on 1 July 2005 the People’s Party lost a seat, because he was elected in Centre Party list, and his replacement came therefore from the CPE list.

In local elections on 16 October 2005 the People's Union was also rather successful, winning 4 seats in Tallinn City Council and becoming part of coalitions in Tartu, Pärnu and Viljandi. In Tallinn the candidates of the People's Union ran in the list of the Social Democratic Party which has fueled speculations about the possible merger of the two parties. Chairmen of both parties have declared those speculations groundless.

Following the People’s Party’s poor performance in the March 2007 parliamentary elections, it was not reappointed to the coalition government, which continued to be led by the Reform Party. The Center Party and the People’s Party were replaced by the Social Democrats and Pro Patria/Res Publica.

After continued worsening of election results, ERL started to look for a possible merging partner; in 2010, talks with the Social Democratic Party were successfully concluded, and a special congress on merging ERL into the SDE was to be held on 23 May 2010. However, at the party congress, only 172 delegates out of 412 supported the deal; it was considered likely that the ERL would merge with the Centre Party instead. Following the failed merger attempt, leading ERL members left the party and joined the SDE. Since defections (three MPs joined the SDE, one the Reform Party and one Center Party) the ERL had only 1 MP left, which means that it did not have a faction status.

In the 2011 parliamentary election, the ERL did not pass 5% threshold and became an extra-parliamentary party.

Finally, on 24 March 2012, the party merged with the Estonian Patriotic Movement into the Conservative People's Party of Estonia. In an earlier 2006 press release, the Patriotic Movement had characterized the People's Union (and Center Party) as traitors. According to surveys carried out by TNS Emor, the party has lost all its support (0% in April and May 2012).

== Electoral results ==
=== Parliamentary elections ===
| Election | Votes | % | Seats | +/– | Government |
|---|---|---|---|---|---|
| 1995 (Note: with Estonian Coalition Party) | 174,248 | 32.2 (#1) | 41 / 101 | | Coalition |
| 1999 | 35,204 | 7.3 (#6) | 7 / 101 | – | Opposition |
| 2003 (Note: including members of the New Estonia Party) | 64,463 | 13.0 (#4) | 13 / 101 | ▲6 | Coalition |
| 2007 | 39,215 | 7.1 (#6) | 6 / 101 | ▼7 | Opposition |
| 2011 | 12,184 | 2.1 (#6) | 0 / 101 | ▼6 | Extra-parliamentary |

=== European Parliament elections ===
| Election | Votes | % | Seats | +/– |
|---|---|---|---|---|
| 2004 | 18,687 | 8.0 (#5) | 0 / 6 | |
