= Kristen Michal =

Prime Minister of Estonia since 2024

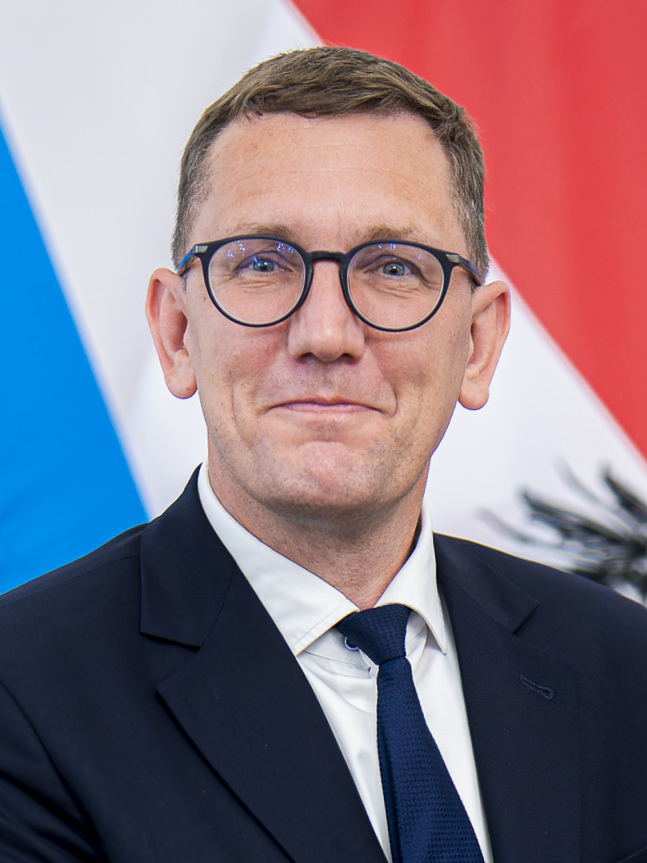
- Michal in 2026

Prime Minister of Estonia
- Incumbent
- Assumed office 23 July 2024
- President: Alar Karis; Ülle Madise
- Preceded by: Kaja Kallas

Leader of the Estonian Reform Party
- Incumbent
- Assumed office 8 September 2024
- Preceded by: Kaja Kallas

Minister of Climate
- In office 17 April 2023 – 23 July 2024
- Prime Minister: Kaja Kallas
- Preceded by: Madis Kallas
- Succeeded by: Yoko Alender

Minister of Economic Affairs and Infrastructure
- In office 9 April 2015 – 23 November 2016
- Prime Minister: Taavi Rõivas
- Preceded by: Urve Palo
- Succeeded by: Kadri Simson

Minister of Justice
- In office 6 April 2011 – 10 December 2012
- Prime Minister: Andrus Ansip
- Preceded by: Rein Lang
- Succeeded by: Hanno Pevkur

Member of the Riigikogu
- In office 12 May 2004 – 17 April 2023

Personal details
- Born: 12 July 1975 (age 51) Tallinn, then part of Estonian SSR, Soviet Union
- Party: Reform (since 1996)
- Spouse: Evelin Oras
- Children: 3
- Education: University Nord

Kristen Michal (Estonian: [ˈkristen ˈmihːɑl]; born 12 July 1975) is an Estonian politician who is the prime minister of Estonia, having taken office on 23 July 2024. He previously served as minister of justice from 2011 to 2012, minister of economic affairs and infrastructure from 2015 to 2016, and minister of climate from 2023 to 2024.

== Early life and education ==
Michal was born in Tallinn on 12 July 1975. He studied law at University Nord in Tallinn and graduated with a bachelor's degree in 2009. He has been pursuing a master's degree in law at Tallinn University since 2009.

== Political career ==
As a member of the Estonian Reform Party, Michal worked in 1996–2002 as an advisor to the party at different levels. In 2002, he became an advisor to then prime minister Siim Kallas. Michal served as the elder of the administrative district of Kesklinn, Tallinn in 2002–2003. In 2003, he was appointed secretary general of the Reform Party and held this position until 2011. Michal was elected member of parliament (Riigikogu) in 2005–2011 and 2012–2015.

Michal was appointed Minister of Justice on 6 April 2011, replacing another Reform Party member Rein Lang. In May 2012, Michal was at the centre of accusations by Silver Meikar, a Reform Party member and a former member of the Riigikogu, that the Reform Party has been receiving donations from dubious sources for years. Both Michal and Prime Minister Andrus Ansip denied these allegations. Delegates from the Council of Europe's GRECO anti-corruption watchdog visited the country in June 2012 to investigate the accusations.

On 31 July 2012, the Estonian State Prosecutor's Office announced that Michal and Kalev Lillo, another Reform Party member, were suspects in this case and that both had been interrogated. Michal was investigated on accusations of money laundering and illegal party financing. On 10 September 2012, the first day of parliamentary session, the Social Democratic Party's faction started a petition process for the resignation of Michal through a vote of no confidence. However, petition failed on 19 September 2012 when the party gave up the process. Michal announced that if he would be found guilty, he would resign from his post. The Estonian State Prosecutor's Office closed the case on 15 October 2012 without finding evidence of wrongdoing.

Michal's term as Minister of Justice ended on 10 December 2012, when he resigned from office. He was replaced in that office by Hanno Pevkur. From 9 April 2015 to 23 November 2016, Michal served as the minister of economic affairs and infrastructure.

=== Prime Minister of Estonia (2024–present) ===
On 29 June 2024, Michal was nominated by the Estonian Reform Party to replace Kaja Kallas in the office of Prime Minister of Estonia, after Kallas had been appointed EU High Representative for Foreign Affairs and Security Policy. Kristen Michal's cabinet took office on 23 July 2024, after the 14 ministers were sworn in before the Riigikogu. In August 2025, Michal's government coalition lost its majority in parliament after two members left the Reform Party. His government thereafter survived a motion of no confidence in October.

== Personal life ==
Michal and his partner Evelin Oras, a political advisor, have been together since the mid-2000s. They have three children. His father Heini is an engineer and his mother Viiu has an economics degree. He has a younger brother Mihkel (born 1978), who was a member of the Reform Party from 1998 to 2012. In addition to Estonian, he also speaks English, Finnish, German and Russian. Michal's hobbies are fishing, sports (including tennis), and literature.

== See also ==
- List of current heads of state and government
- List of heads of the executive by approval rating

Political offices
Preceded by Rein Lang	Minister of Justice; 2011–2012	Succeeded by Hanno Pevkur
Preceded by Urve Palo	Minister of Economic Affairs and Infrastructure; 2015–2016	Succeeded by Kadri Simson
Preceded by Madis Kallas	Minister of Climate; 2023–2024	Succeeded by Yoko Alender
Preceded by Kaja Kallas	Prime Minister of Estonia; 2024–present	Incumbent
