= Estonian Reform Party =

Political party in Estonia

Estonian Reform Party Eesti Reformierakond
- Chairperson: Kristen Michal
- General Secretary: Kristo Enn Vaga
- Founder: Siim Kallas
- Founded: 18 November 1994; 31 years ago
- Merger of: Estonian Liberal Democratic Party; Reform Party
- Headquarters: Tallinn, Tõnismägi 9 10119
- Newspaper: Paremad Uudised; Reformikiri
- Youth wing: Estonian Reform Party Youth
- Membership (2024): ▼9,669
- Ideology: Liberalism (Estonian); Conservative liberalism
- Political position: Centre-right
- European affiliation: Alliance of Liberals and Democrats for Europe
- European Parliament group: Renew Europe
- International affiliation: Liberal International
- Colours: Yellow; Blue
- Slogan: Parem Eesti kõigile ('A Better Estonia for Everyone')
- Riigikogu: 37 / 101
- Municipalities: 125 / 1,688
- European Parliament: 1 / 7

Party flag

Website
- reform.ee
- Politics of Estonia; Political parties; Elections; A: The Reform Party under the leadership of Kristen Michal has been referred to in the media as right-wing liberal and Michal has recently self-identified himself with the exact label. Other MPs in the party also openly affiliate with the label as a descriptor for the party's ideology."

The Estonian Reform Party (Estonian: Eesti Reformierakond) is a liberal political party in Estonia. The party has been led by Kristen Michal since 2024. It is colloquially known as the "Squirrel Party" (Estonian: Oravapartei) or as "the Squirrels" (Estonian: oravad), referencing its logo.

It was founded in 1994 by Siim Kallas, then-president of the Bank of Estonia, as a split from Pro Patria National Coalition Party. As the Reform Party has participated in most of the government coalitions in Estonia since the mid-1990s, its influence has been significant, especially regarding Estonia's free-market and low-taxation policies. The party has been a full member of Liberal International since 1996, having been an observer member between 1994 and 1996, and a full member of the Alliance of Liberals and Democrats for Europe (ALDE). Reform Party leaders Siim Kallas, Taavi Rõivas, Andrus Ansip, Kaja Kallas and Kristen Michal have all served as prime ministers of Estonia. From 11 March 2025, the party has been the senior member in a coalition government with Estonia 200.

== History ==
The Estonian Reform Party was founded on 18 November 1994, joining together the Reform Party – a splinter from the Pro Patria National Coalition (RKEI) – and the Estonian Liberal Democratic Party (ELDP). The new party, which had 710 members at its foundation, was led by Siim Kallas, who had been president of the Bank of Estonia. Kallas was not viewed as being associated with Mart Laar's government and was generally considered a proficient central bank governor, having overseen the successful introduction of the Estonian kroon. The party formed ties with the Free Democratic Party of Germany, the Liberal People's Party of Sweden, the Swedish People's Party of Finland, and Latvian Way.

=== Siim Kallas ===
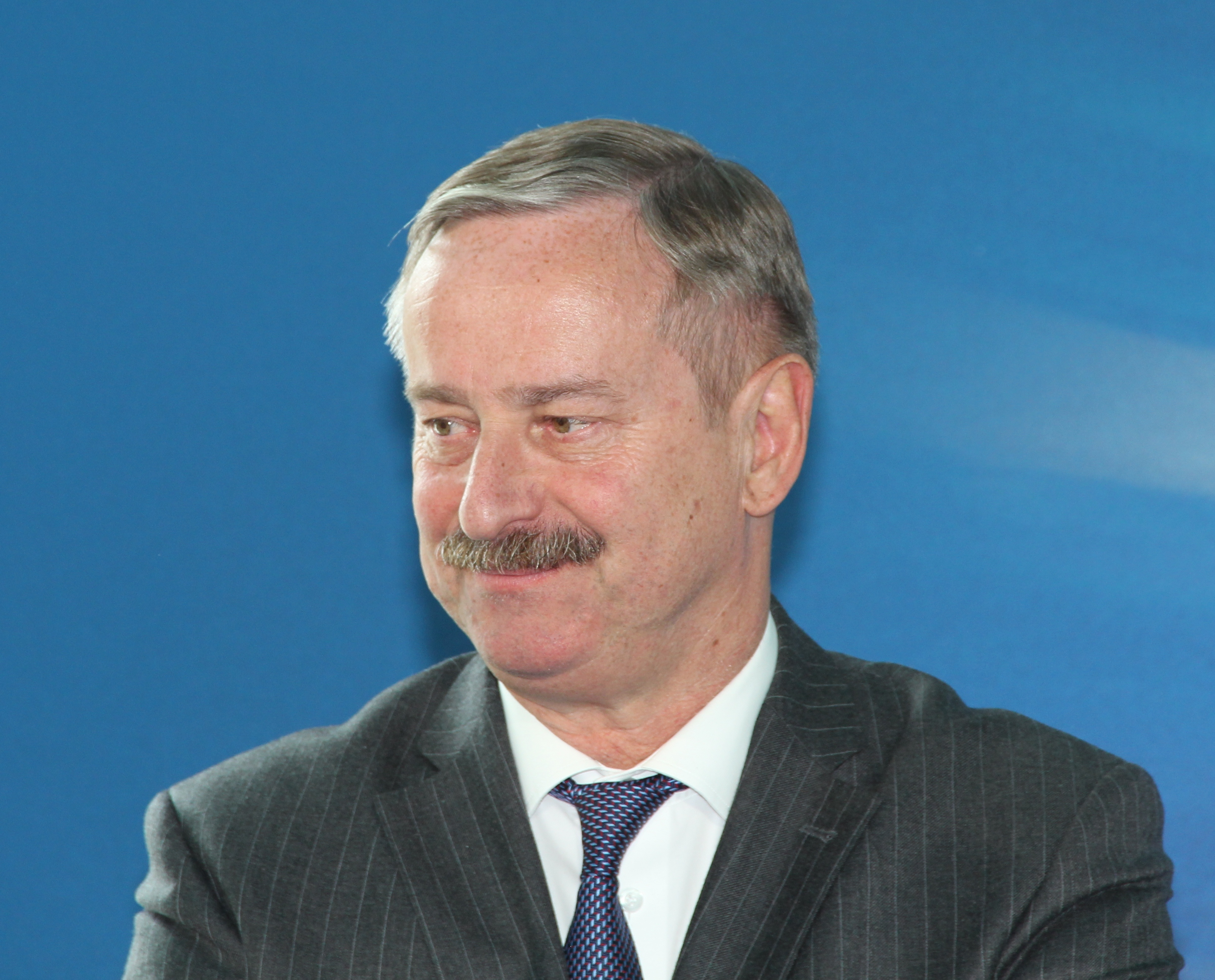
Siim Kallas, former vice-president of the European Commission and European Commissioner for Transport

Siim Kallas was leader of the Reform Party from 1994 to 2004. He was Prime Minister of Estonia from 2002 to 2003. In the party's first parliamentary election in March 1995, it won 19 seats, catapulting it into second place, behind the Coalition Party. Tiit Vähi tried to negotiate a coalition with the Reform Party, but the talks broke down over economic policy, with the Reform Party opposing agricultural subsidies and supporting the maintenance of Estonia's flat-rate income tax. While the Coalition Party formed a new government with the Centre Party at first, a taping scandal involving Centre Party leader Edgar Savisaar led to the Reform Party replacing the Centre Party in the coalition in November 1995. Kallas was appointed as Minister of Foreign Affairs, with five other Reform Party members serving in the cabinet. The Reform Party left the government in November 1996 after the Coalition Party signed a cooperation agreement with the Centre Party without consulting them.

At the 1999 election, the Reform Party dropped one seat to 18, finishing third behind the Centre Party and the conservative Pro Patria Union. The ER formed a centre-right coalition with the Pro Patria Union and the Moderates, with Mart Laar as Prime Minister and Siim Kallas as Minister of Finance, and with Toomas Savi returned as Speaker. Although the coalition was focused on EU and NATO accession, the Reform Party successfully delivered its manifesto pledge to abolish the corporate tax, one of its most notable achievements. After the October 1999 municipal elections, the three parties replicated their alliance in Tallinn.

The party served in government again from March 1999 to December 2001 in a tripartite government with Pro Patria Union and People's Party Moderates, from January 2002 to March 2003 with the Estonian Centre Party, from March 2003 to March 2005 with Res Publica and People's Union, from March 2005 to March 2007 with the Centre Party and People's Union, from March 2007 to May 2009 with the Pro Patria and Res Publica Union and the Social Democratic Party. From May 2009, the Reform Party was in a coalition government with the Pro Patria and Res Publica Union.

=== Andrus Ansip ===
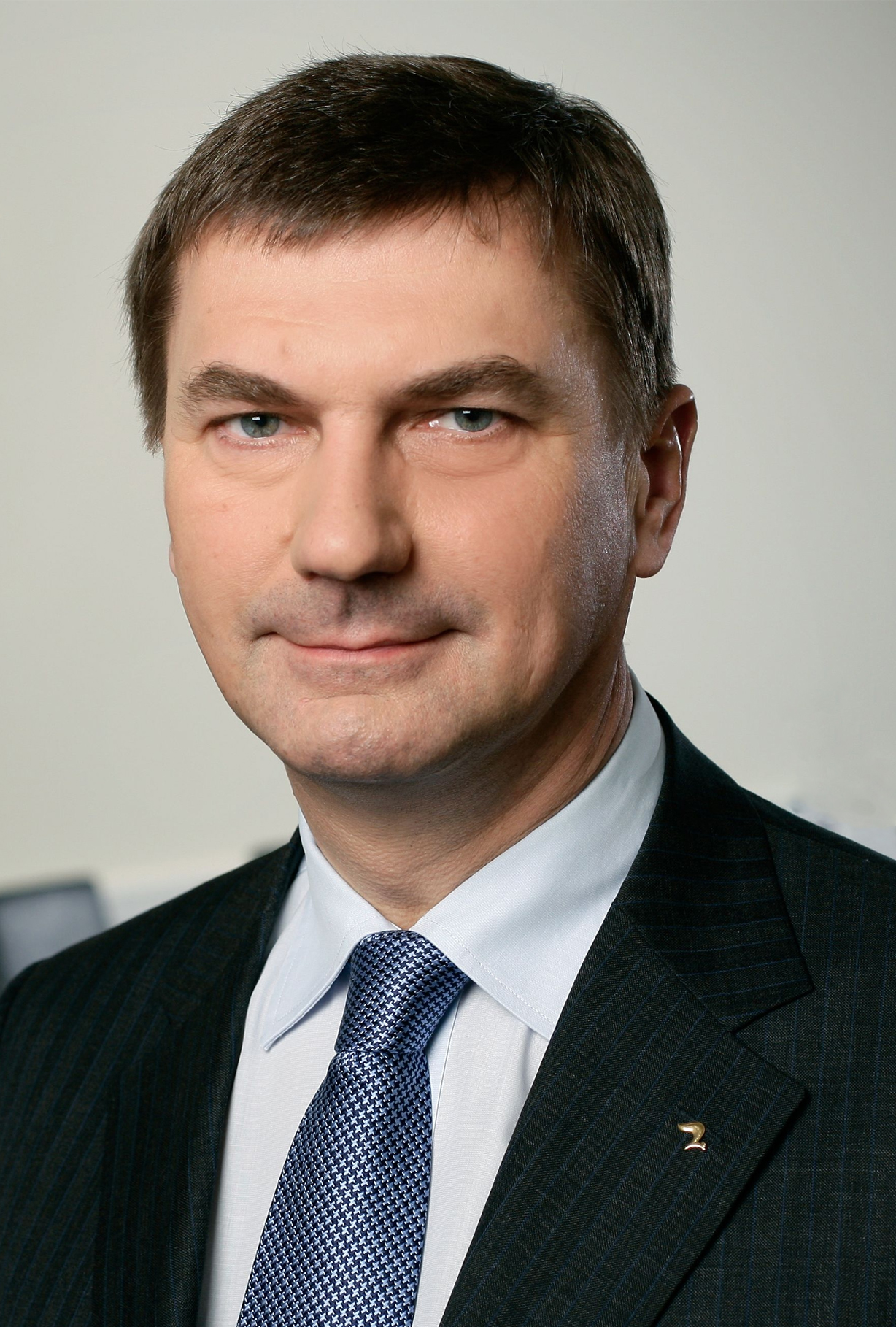
Andrus Ansip, former prime minister of Estonia

Andrus Ansip was Prime Minister of Estonia from April 2005 to March 2014. After the 2007 parliamentary election the party held 31 out of 101 seats in the Riigikogu, receiving 153,040 votes (28% of the total), an increase of +10%, resulting in a net gain of 12 seats.

=== Taavi Rõivas ===
Following the resignation of Andrus Ansip, a new cabinet was installed on 24 March 2014, with Taavi Rõivas of the Reform Party serving as Prime Minister in coalition with the Social Democratic Party (SDE).

In the 2014 European elections held on 25 May 2014, the Reform Party won 24.3% of the national vote, returning two MEPs.

In the 2015 parliamentary election held on 1 March 2015, the Reform Party received 27.7% of the vote and 30 seats in the Riigikogu. It went on to form a coalition with Social Democratic Party and Pro Patria and Res Publica Union. In November 2016, the coalition split because of internal struggle. After coalition talks, a new coalition was formed between Center Party, SDE and IRL, while Reform Party was left in the opposition for the first time since 1999. Rõivas subsequently stepped down as the chairman of the party.

=== Hanno Pevkur ===
On 7 January 2017, Hanno Pevkur was elected the new chairman of the Reform Party. Pevkur's leadership was divided from the start and he faced increasing criticism till the end of the year. On 13 December 2017, Pevkur announced that he would not run for the chairmanship from January 2018.

=== Kaja Kallas ===
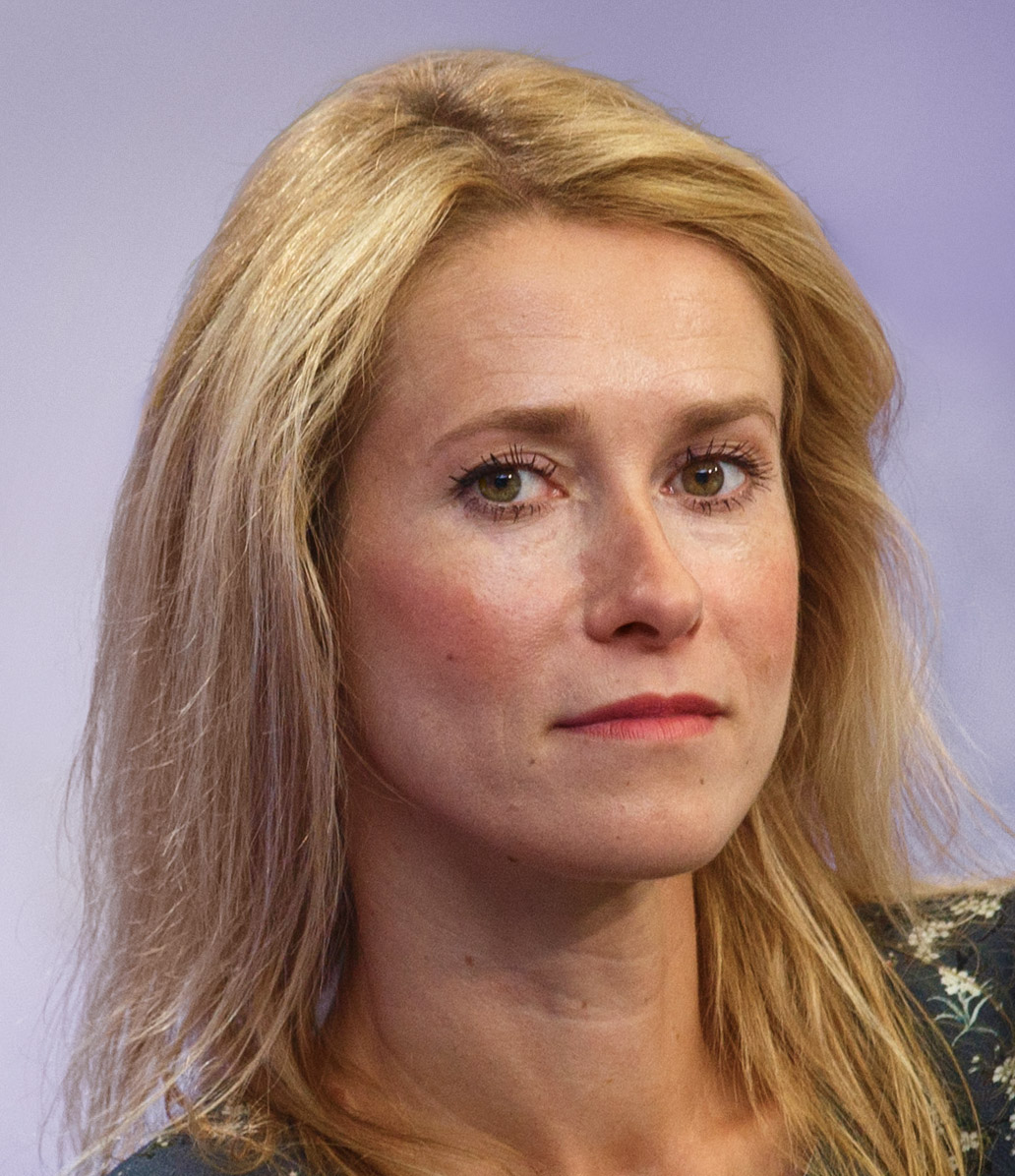
Kaja Kallas, leader of Reform Party and former prime minister of Estonia

Kaja Kallas was elected party leader on 14 April 2018.

Under Kallas' leadership during the 2019 election, the Reform Party achieved its best electoral result to date with 28.8% of the vote and 34 seats, although it initially did not form a government and remained in opposition to the second Ratas government.

In January 2021, after the resignation of Jüri Ratas as prime minister, Kallas formed a Reform Party-led coalition government with the Estonian Centre Party. However, on 3 June 2022, Kallas dismissed the seven ministers affiliated with the Centre Party, governing as a minority government until a new coalition government with Isamaa and SDE as minority partners was formed on 8 July.

In the 2023 parliamentary election, the Reform Party improved on its 2019 electoral performance, with 31.2% of the vote 37 seats. On 7 March 2023, the party initiated coalition negotiations with the new Estonia 200 party and the SDE. A coalition agreement between the three parties was reached by 7 April, allocating seven ministerial seats for the Reform Party, and was officially signed on 10 April. On 17 April, the third Kallas government was sworn into office.

=== Kristen Michal ===
In July 2024, Kristen Michal became Estonia’s new prime minister to succeed Kaja Kallas, who resigned as prime minister on July 15 to become the European Union’s new High Representative of the Union for Foreign Affairs and Security Policy.

On 10 March 2025, Kristen Michal announced a "government repair" and expelled the Social Democrats from the coalition. Michal will ask the President to remove the party's ministers from office on 11 March. He stated that the remaining coalition intends to move toward the right and scrap several tax hikes and wage increases.

== Ideology and platform ==
Described as being on the centre, centre-right, or right-wing of the political spectrum, the Estonian Reform Party has variously been described in its ideological orientation as liberal, classical-liberal, liberal-conservative, and conservative-liberal. The party has consistently advocated policies of economic liberalism and fiscal conservatism, and has also been described as neoliberal.

- The party supports Estonian 0% corporate tax on re-invested income and wants to eliminate the dividend tax.
- The party wanted to cut flat income tax rate from 22% (in 2007) to 18% by 2011. Because of the economic crisis, the campaign for cutting income tax rate was put on hold with the tax rate at 21% in 2008 and 2009.
- The party used to oppose VAT general rate increases until late spring 2009, when it changed its position in the light of the dire economic crisis and the need to find more money for the budget. VAT was increased from 18% to 20% on 1 July 2009.

== Political support ==
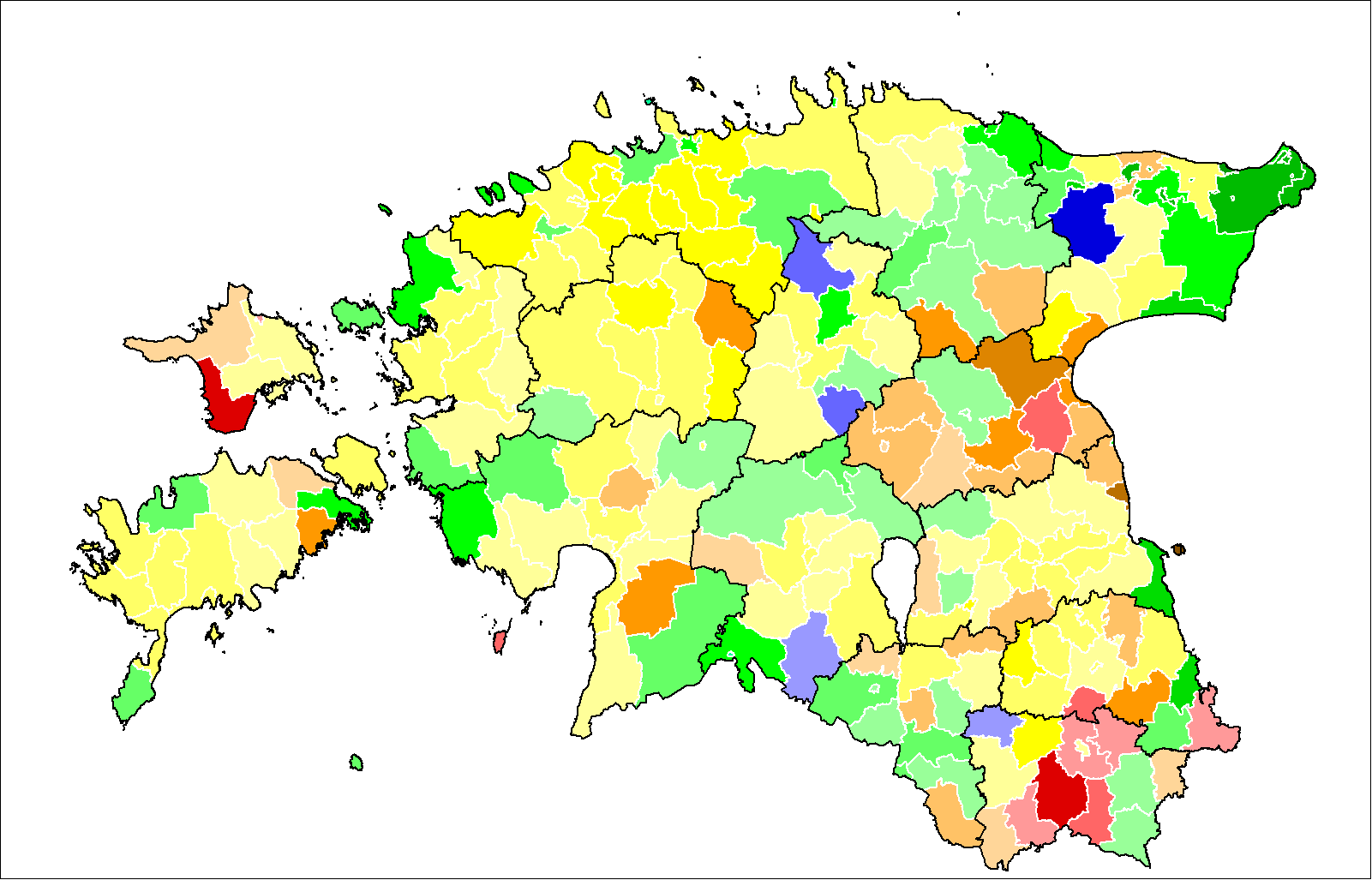
The Estonian Reform Party is the strongest party in the area surrounding Tallinn, in north-western Estonia and across Tartu County in the east as illustrated in yellow by this map of the 2007 parliamentary election results.

The party is supported predominantly by young, well-educated, urban professionals. The Reform Party's vote base is heavily focused in the cities; although it receives only one-fifth of its support from Tallinn, it receives three times as many votes from other cities, despite them being home to fewer than 40% more voters overall.

Its voter profile is significantly younger than average, while its voters are well-educated, with the fewest high school drop-outs of any party. Its membership is the most male-dominated of all the parties, yet it receives the support of more female voters than average. Reform Party voters also tend to have higher incomes, with 43% of Reform Party voters coming from the top 30% of all voters by income.

== Organisation ==
The Reform Party has been a full member of the Alliance of Liberals and Democrats for Europe Party (formerly the European Liberal Democrat and Reform Party, ELDR) since December 1998. In the European Parliament, the party's MEPS Andrus Ansip and Urmas Paetsits in the ALDE group in the Assembly. The Reform Party has been a full member of the Liberal International since 1996, having been an observer member from 1994 to 1996.

The party claims to have 12,000 members.

The party's youth wing is the Estonian Reform Party Youth, which includes members aged 15 to 35. The organisation claims to have 4,500 members, and its chairman is Doris Lisett Rudnevs.

== Election results ==
=== Parliamentary elections ===
Election	Leader	Votes	%	Seats	+/–	Status
1995	Siim Kallas	87,531	16.19 (#2)	19 / 101	New	Opposition (1995)
1995	Siim Kallas	87,531	16.19 (#2)	19 / 101	New	Coalition (1995–1996)
1995	Siim Kallas	87,531	16.19 (#2)	19 / 101	New	Opposition (1996–1999)
1999	Siim Kallas	77,088	15.92 (#3)	18 / 101	▼1	Coalition
2003	Siim Kallas	87,551	17.69 (#3)	19 / 101	▲1	Coalition
2007	Andrus Ansip	153,044	27.82 (#1)	31 / 101	▲12	Coalition
2011	Andrus Ansip	164,255	28.56 (#1)	33 / 101	▲2	Coalition
2015	Taavi Rõivas	158,970	27.69 (#1)	30 / 101	▼3	Coalition (2015–2016)
2015	Taavi Rõivas	158,970	27.69 (#1)	30 / 101	▼3	Opposition (2016–2019)
2019	Kaja Kallas	162,363	28.93 (#1)	34 / 101	▲4	Opposition (2019–2021)
2019	Kaja Kallas	162,363	28.93 (#1)	34 / 101	▲4	Coalition (2021–2023)
2023	Kaja Kallas	190,632	31.24 (#1)	37 / 101	▲3	Coalition

=== European Parliament elections ===
Election	List leader	Votes	%	Seats	+/–	EP Group
2004	Toomas Savi	28,377	12.22 (#3)	1 / 6	New	ALDE
2009	Kristiina Ojuland	79,849	15.32 (#3)	1 / 6	Steady	ALDE
2014	Andrus Ansip	79,849	24.31 (#1)	2 / 6	▲1	ALDE
2019	Andrus Ansip	87,158	26.2 (#1)	2 / 7	Steady	RE
2024	Urmas Paet	66,017	17.93 (#3)	1 / 7	▼1	RE

== European representation ==
In the European Parliament, the Estonian Reform Party sits in the Renew Europe group with one MEP.

In the European Committee of the Regions, the Estonian Reform Party sits in the Renew Europe CoR group, with two full and two alternate members for the 2025–2030 mandate.

== See also ==
- Liberalism and centrism in Estonia
