= 2019 Estonian parliamentary election =

- 3 March 2019

All 101 seats in the Riigikogu 51 seats needed for a majority
- Opinion polls
- Turnout: 63.67% (▼0.56pp)
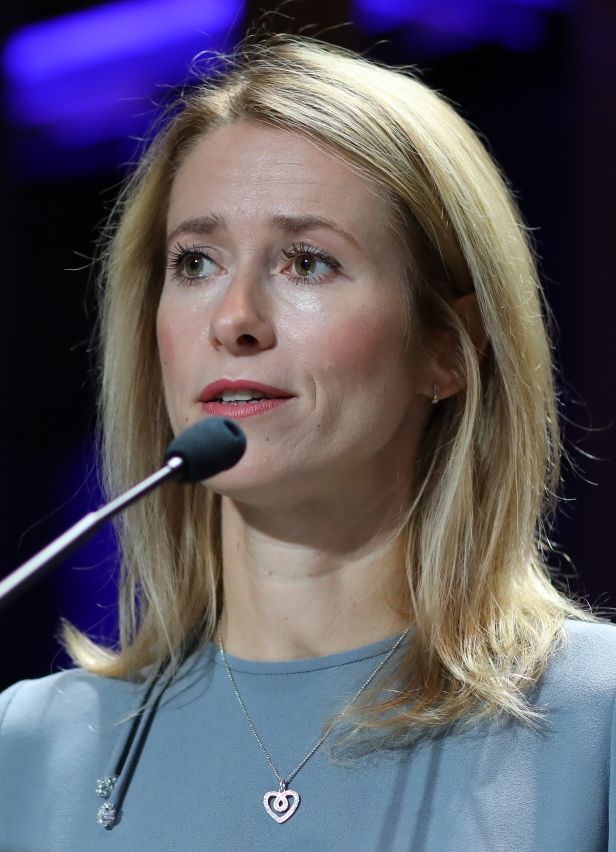

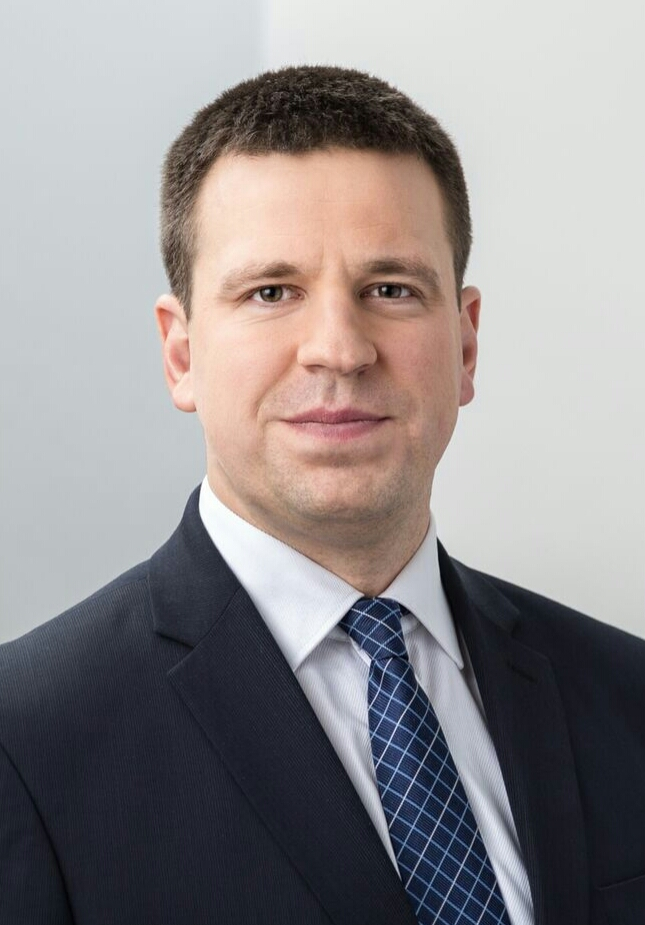

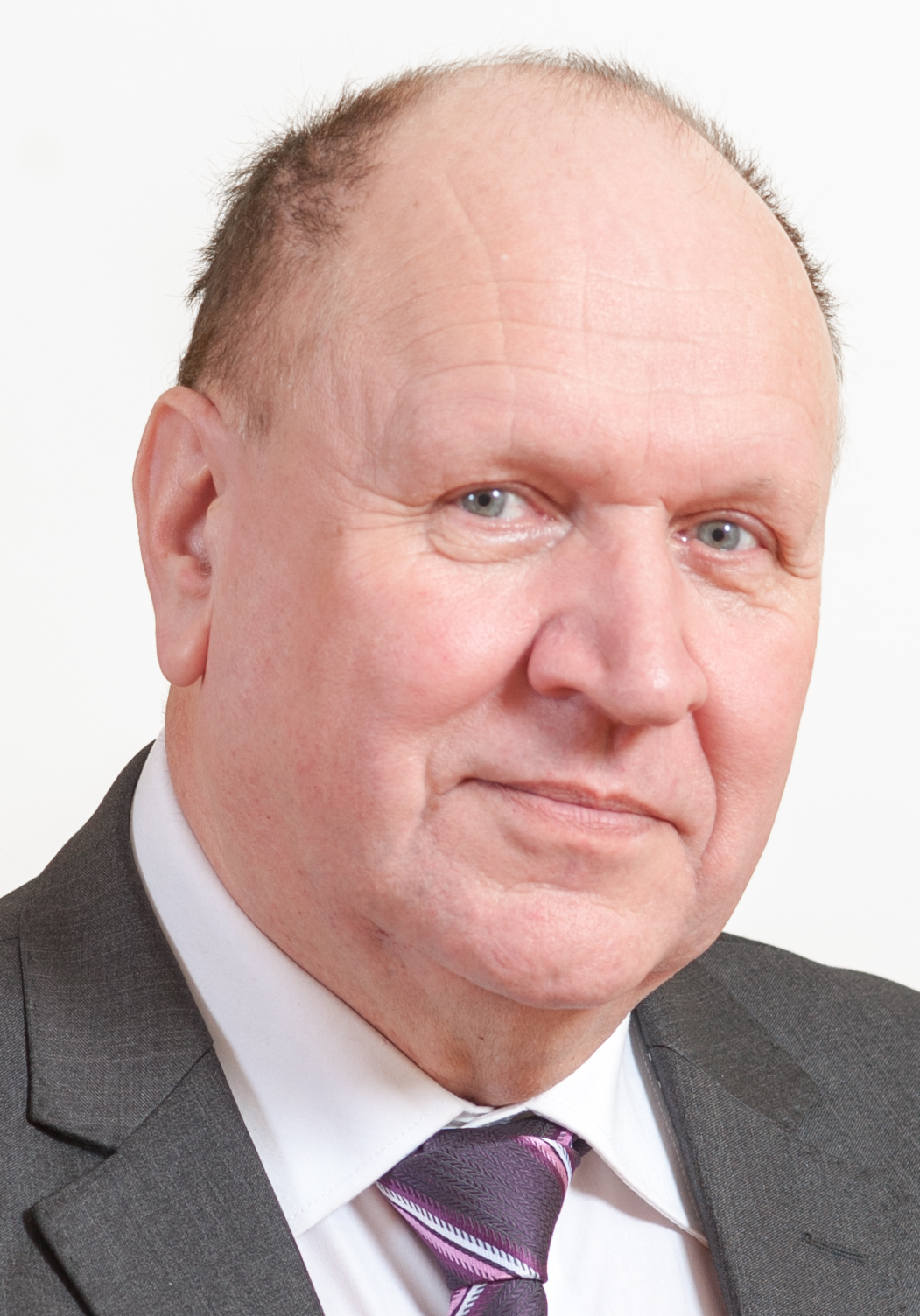

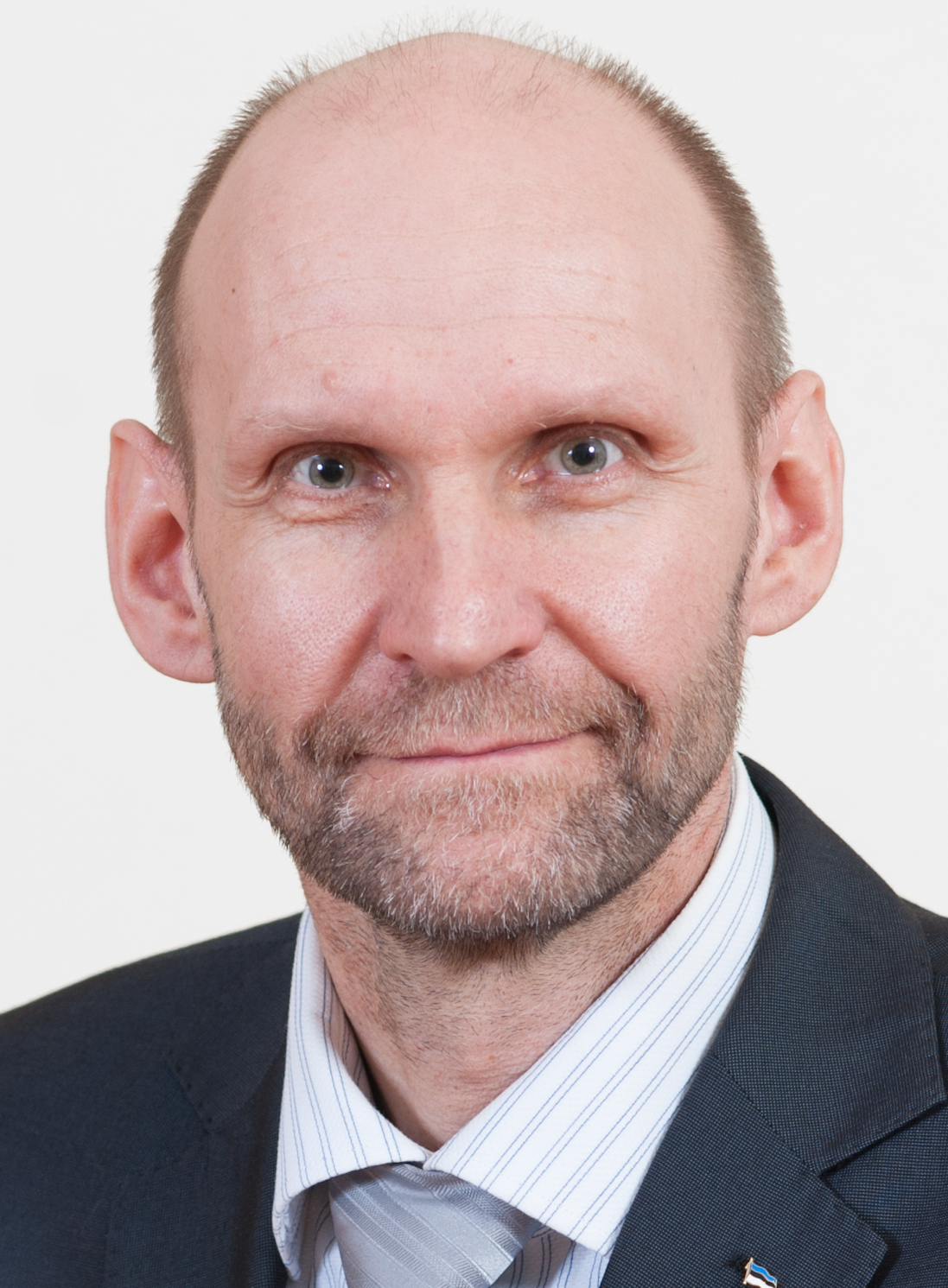

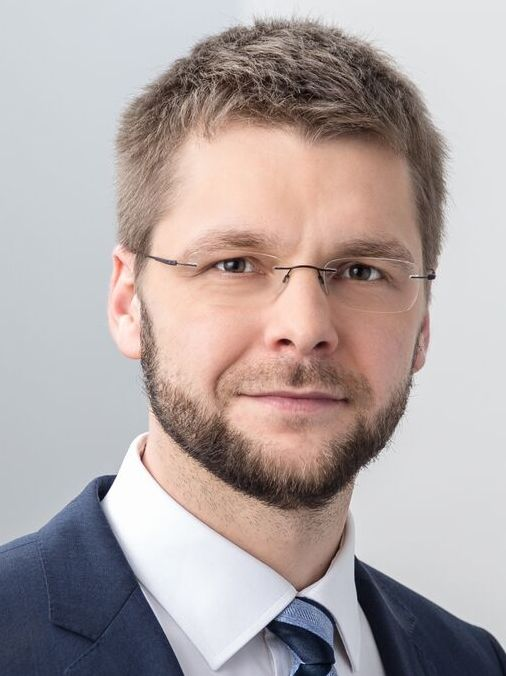
	First party	Second party	Third party
Leader	Kaja Kallas	Jüri Ratas	Mart Helme
Party	Reform	Centre	EKRE
Last election	27.69%, 30 seats	24.81%, 27 seats	8.15%, 7 seats
Seats won	34	26	19
Seat change	▲4	▼1	▲12
Popular vote	162,363	129,618	99,671
Percentage	28.93%	23.10%	17.76%
Swing	▲1.24pp	▼1.71pp	▲9.61pp
	Fourth party	Fifth party
Leader	Helir-Valdor Seeder	Jevgeni Ossinovski
Party	Isamaa	SDE
Last election	13.71%, 14 seats	15.19%, 15 seats
Seats won	12	10
Seat change	▼2	▼5
Popular vote	64,219	55,175
Percentage	11.44%	9.83%
Swing	▼2.27pp	▼5.36pp
- Distribution of seats and the largest party by electoral districts
Prime Minister before election
Jüri Ratas
Centre
Prime Minister after election
Jüri Ratas
Centre

Parliamentary elections were held in Estonia on 3 March 2019. The newly elected 101 members of the 14th Riigikogu assembled at Toompea Castle in Tallinn within ten days of the election. The Reform Party remained the largest party, gaining four seats for a total of 34 and the Conservative People's Party had the largest gain overall, increasing their seat count by 12 to a total of 19 seats.

The Centre Party's result fell below expectations after being polled in tight competition with the Reform Party right before the election. Isamaa and SDE both lost support. Estonia 200 finished at 4.4%, falling just short of the 5% threshold. The Free Party's vote share fell to just 1.2%, resulting in the party losing all 8 of the seats it won in 2015.

In January 2019, the National Electoral Committee announced that ten political parties and fourteen individual candidates had registered to take part in the 2019 parliamentary election. During the campaign period, issues discussed most extensively regarded income taxation and immigration. Individuals from contesting political parties also participated in multiple organised debates in January and February 2019.

The election had a record percentage of votes cast electronically over the Internet up to that point in time. Centre successfully negotiated with the Conservative People's Party (EKRE) and Isamaa afterwards, forming a second government headed by Ratas in April, becoming the first government ever to include EKRE.

== Background ==
Following the 2015 parliamentary election, the Reform Party started coalition talks with the Social Democrats, Pro Patria and Res Publica Union (IRL) and the Free Party. After nearly three weeks of negotiations, the Free Party left the coalition talks, mainly due to disagreements on taxation and state funding of parties. The three remaining parties, known as the Triple Alliance parties, signed the coalition treaty on 8 April 2015, and the cabinet took office on 9 April.

On 9 September 2016 Minister of Foreign Affairs, Marina Kaljurand, announced her resignation to run independently in the 2016 Estonian presidential election. She had previously been the favourite for Reform Party nominee, but was eventually dropped in favour of Siim Kallas. Kaljurand later ran for the European Parliament on the list of the Social Democratic Party.

On 7 November 2016, the Social Democrats and the Pro Patria and Res Publica Union announced that they were asking Prime Minister Taavi Rõivas to resign and were planning on negotiating a new majority government. The announcement came soon after the opposition had submitted a motion to express lack of confidence in Rõivas’ government. SDE and IRL proceeded to support the motion, leaving the Reform the only party to support Rõivas. Rõivas commented the situation by declining to resign and arguing that a democratically elected government should be only removed by a democratic vote. In the following vote of confidence on 9 November, the majority of Riigikogu voted in favor of removing the prime minister’s government. In the following coalition talks, the Centre Party, SDE and IRL formed a new coalition led by Centre Party's chairman Jüri Ratas. The new coalition was sworn in on 23 November, becoming the first time since 1999 the liberal centre-right Reform Party were out of the government.

On 6 December 2016, Minister of Rural Affairs, Martin Repinski, resigned due to massive media criticism of the questionable business practices of his goat farm. Centre Party decided to nominate Tarmo Tamm as his successor.

On 24 May 2017, Minister of Public Administration, Mihhail Korb, resigned, in the interests of the health of the coalition, after the scandal that erupted following his comment on his lack of support for Estonia's NATO membership. He was replaced with Jaak Aab. Aab himself resigned on 17 April 2018 after being caught by Police speeding (73 km/h in 50 km/h zone) and driving under the influence (blood alcohol level 0.28‰) and was replaced with Janek Mäggi, until then non-partisan public relations specialist.

On 7 April 2018, Minister of Health and Labour, Jevgeni Ossinovski, announced his intention to resign in order to focus on leading the Social Democratic Party in the March 2019 elections. He was replaced with Riina Sikkut.

On 6 May 2018, IRL changed its name to Isamaa.

== Electoral system ==
The 101 members of the Riigikogu are elected by proportional representation in twelve multi-member constituencies. Seats are allocated using a modified D'Hondt method. Parties have to pass a nationwide threshold of 5% to win seats. If the number of votes cast for an individual candidate exceeds or equals the simple quota in their constituency (obtained by dividing the number of valid votes cast in the electoral district by the number of seats in the district), they are deemed elected. The remaining seats are allocated based on each party's share of the vote and the number of votes received by individual candidates. Any seats not allocated at the constituency level are filled using a closed list presented by each party at the national level.

Estonian citizens who are at least 18 years old, are registered in the voting list, have not been declared incapacitated or convicted of a crime by a court, or are serving a prison sentence have the right to vote.

=== Seats by electoral district ===
Electoral District		Seats
1	Haabersti, Põhja-Tallinn and Kristiine districts in Tallinn	10
2	Kesklinn, Lasnamäe and Pirita districts in Tallinn	13
3	Mustamäe and Nõmme districts in Tallinn	8
4	Harju (excluding Tallinn) and Rapla counties	15
5	Hiiu, Lääne and Saare counties	6
6	Lääne-Viru county	5
7	Ida-Viru county	7
8	Järva and Viljandi counties	7
9	Jõgeva and Tartu counties (excluding Tartu)	7
10	City of Tartu	8
11	Võru, Valga and Põlva counties	8
12	Pärnu county	7

== Contesting parties ==
The Estonian National Electoral Committee announced that ten political parties and 14 individual candidates registered to take part in the 2019 parliamentary election. Their registration numbers and order were determined by a draw lot.

#	Name	Ideology	Political position	Leader	Total candidates	2015 result	
#	Name	Ideology	Political position	Leader	Total candidates	Votes (%)	Seats
1	Free Party	Conservatism	Centre-right	Andres Herkel	125	8.7%	8 / 101
2	Reform Party	Classical liberalism	Centre-right	Kaja Kallas	125	27.7%	30 / 101
3	Greens	Green politics	Centre-left	Züleyxa Izmailova	125	0.9%	0 / 101
4	Social Democratic Party	Social democracy	Centre-left	Jevgeni Ossinovski	125	15.2%	15 / 101
5	Biodiversity Party	Grassroots democracy	Centre	Collective leadership	73	did not exist	
6	Conservative People's Party	Right-wing populism	Right-wing to far-right	Mart Helme	125	8.1%	7 / 101
7	Estonia 200	Liberalism	Centre	Kristina Kallas	125	did not exist	
8	Centre Party	Plurinationalism	Centre-left	Jüri Ratas	125	24.8%	27 / 101
9	United Left Party	Russian minority politics	Left-wing	Julia Sommer	11	0.1%	0 / 101
10	Isamaa	National conservatism	Centre-right to right-wing	Helir-Valdor Seeder	125	13.7%	14 / 101
—	Individual candidates	—			14	did not exist	

== Campaign ==
=== Restrictions on advertisements ===
From January 23, 2019 until election day on March 3, it was prohibited to advertise an individual candidate, political party, or a person running on a party list, or their logo or other distinguishing mark or program on the inside or outside of a building, facility, public transport vehicle, or taxi, as well as other outdoor political advertising. Political posters and billboards that were located inside premises open to the public (for example, in the premises of a store, theater, cinema, etc.) and that were not placed facing the window towards the outside were not considered outdoor advertising. A name, photo or a logo on a vehicle or trailer were not considered outdoor political advertising but during the ban period, the vehicle could not have a candidate's number or a direct call to vote for them or anyone else. On election day, active election campaigning was prohibited everywhere, including on television and radio. Any kind of political agitation was prohibited in the polling station and in the rooms to be passed through when entering it. The organization of public opinion polls was allowed both during the election period and on election day.

=== Initiatives to improve campaign quality ===
The initiative „Kust sa tead?“ ("How do you know?") called for the use of science-based argumentation in the election campaign with the aim of highlighting the importance of proving politicians' claims. Among others, several universities and research centers joined the initiative, and its patrons were Chancellor of Justice Ülle Madise and Milrem Research Director Mart Noorma. The website of the event www.kussatead.ee was used gather notes about cases where politicians' statements were not based on facts, evidence or science-based arguments.

Vabaühenduste Union (Union of Non-Governmental Organizations) called on the candidates to "follow good electoral practice so that the campaigns are meaningful and ethical and help the voter make a wise decision". Behavior in accordance with good electoral practice was monitored by volunteers called "election guards". Their evaluations of the campaign were shared via Facebook and ERR. At the same time, all people were expected to note any possible use of unfair campaign techniques.

=== Electoral compasses ===
ERR, Delfi and Postimees developed general electoral compasses designed to help a voter determine the degree to which his or her views resemble those of various parties and candidates. ERR's electoral compass "Valijakompass" (electoral compass) was prepared in cooperation with the Johan Skytte Institute for Political Studies of the University of Tartu, according to whose director Mihkel Solvak, the statements contained in the compass were chosen in such a way that they cover as many controversial issues as possible, formulating them in a way that forces people to take a clear position. The representatives of the political parties involved in the project also gave their party's position for each statement, which compass users can take a closer look at.

Political scientists from Tallinn University participated in the creation of the Delfi election compass "valimismootor" (electoral engine), who searched for the main election topics from the parties' programs that unite or divide the political forces running for the Riigikogu, and developed 20 election questions based on them. Only political parties which were assessed as capable of crossing the election threshold and at least theoretically participating in the formation of the government were included in the election engine. The Free Party criticized Delfi's electoral compass for excluding several parties, including themselves, Greens and the Biodiversity Party. Andres Herkel, a former leader of the Free Party, claimed that Delfi's editorial team manipulated the public and created the impression that the three political parties did not exist.

The questions of Postimees' election compass "Hääleandja" (vote-giver) were selected by the daily's editors together with political scientist Martin Mölder, who based it on value assessment surveys commissioned by the Institute for Social Studies from Turu-uuringute AS. The compass was criticized by representatives of the Centre Party, Reform Party, Estonia 200, the Social Democrats and the Free Party, who found that the electoral compass is biased towards the favorite topics of more conservative parties such as EKRE and Isamaa and that it contains problematic issues and that they consider the commissioner, Institute for Social Studies, to be conservative-leaning. Martin Mölder claimed that the questions were largely copied from other international surveys, that the questioner's worldview does not determine the respondent's answers, and that Turu-uuringute AS, as the survey provider, has ensured their quality. Psychologist Kenn Konstabel and Mai Beilmann, president of the Association of Estonian Sociologists, expressed doubts about the neutrality of the questions used in the election compass and their applicability as a measure of worldview, the role of the Institute for Social Studies, and the validity of Mölder's explanations. However, political scientist Kristjan Vassil said that he hadn't seen any "highly biased behavior or coding", and he commended its value-based approach.

=== Election promises ===
The Ministry of Finance assessed the expected financial impact of the political parties' election platform promises on the state budget and their pragmatism, including their compliance with the Estonian Constitution and European Union law. According to the analysis of the Ministry, the revenue-cost ratio of financially evaluated promises compared to the state budget of the time was the most in the negatives for EKRE and the Social Democrats, whose fulfillment of promises would bring an additional cost of 2.8 and 2.5 billion euros respectively. The smallest additional cost - 0.7 and 0.02 billion, respectively - would be brought about by the promises of Isamaa and the Biodiversity Party. The most expensive individual promises were EKRE's promises to double pensions (additional cost of 594 million) and reduce VAT (missing revenue of 570 million). At the same time, the Ministry explained that adding up the costs of the promises is conditional and not entirely correct, because in addition to promises that can be measured financially, the parties have many other promises that are difficult to evaluate financially. According to the Ministry of Finance, 7 of Estonia 200's, 6 of EKRE's, 5 of the Free Party's and 2 of the Social Democrats' promises were against either the Estonian Constitution or EU law. All the promises of the Centre Party, Reform Party and Isamaa were in accordance with the law.

The Chamber of Environmental Associations published a summary assessment of the environmental promises of the election programs, finding that environmental issues were more represented in them than in previous years, and that development of forestry and climate issues came first. Environmental associations also asked political parties questions in five major environmental areas (planning of large investments, climate change and energy, forestry, involvement of landowners in nature conservation and environmental fees). In general, the views of the Estonian Greens, the Biodiversity Party and the Social Democrats were considered to be the most environmentally responsible, while the answers of EKRE were seen as the least environmentally friendly.

== Opinion polls ==
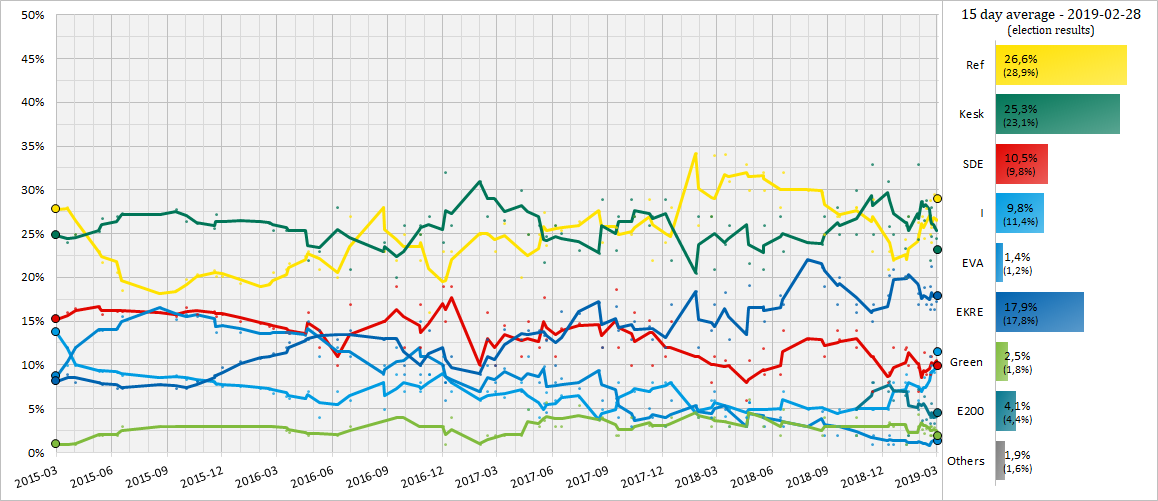

== Results ==
Most voted-for party by counties and city districts, excluding electronic voting (43.8% of all votes): Reform Centre Conservative People's

Most-voted for party (electronic voting) by electoral district: Reform Centre

Party	Votes	%	Seats	+/–
Estonian Reform Party	162,363	28.93	34	+4
Estonian Centre Party	129,618	23.10	26	−1
Conservative People's Party of Estonia	99,671	17.76	19	+12
Isamaa	64,219	11.44	12	−2
Social Democratic Party	55,175	9.83	10	−5
Estonia 200	24,448	4.36	0	New
Estonian Greens	10,227	1.82	0	0
Estonian Biodiversity Party	6,858	1.22	0	New
Estonian Free Party	6,461	1.15	0	−8
Estonian United Left Party	511	0.09	0	0
Independents	1,590	0.28	0	0
Total	561,141	100.00	101	0
Valid votes	561,141	99.31		
Invalid/blank votes	3,904	0.69		
Total votes	565,045	100.00		
Registered voters/turnout	887,420	63.67		
Source: Valimised

=== By constituency ===
Constituency	Reform		Centre		EKRE		Isamaa		Social Democratic	
Constituency	%	S	%	S	%	S	%	S	%	S
No. 1	29.0	3	30.2	4	11.3	1	8.8	1	10.1	2
No. 2	26.3	4	37.6	5	10.2	1	7.7	2	8.4	1
No. 3	32.5	4	23.9	2	14.1	1	10.2	1	9.3	0
No. 4	38.1	5	15.1	2	18.3	4	11.1	1	8.4	1
No. 5	28.6	3	17.9	2	21.5	1	10.5	0	10.7	0
No. 6	23.7	1	19.9	1	21.4	1	20.3	1	9.0	1
No. 7	14.0	1	50.7	3	8.3	1	6.5	0	14.8	1
No. 8	26.1	2	16.7	2	22.4	1	16.5	1	12.5	1
No. 9	27.2	2	15.4	1	22.4	2	17.5	2	9.3	0
No. 10	34.6	3	13.6	1	17.0	2	12.1	1	11.3	1
No. 11	23.3	3	21.3	2	24.7	2	9.6	1	11.7	2
No. 12	26.3	3	19.2	1	28.1	2	12.2	1	6.7	0
Total	28.9	34	23.1	26	17.8	19	11.4	12	9.8	10
Source: Valimised

According to a survey commissioned by ERR from Turu-uuringute AS after the elections, 48% of the respondents were completely or generally satisfied with the election results, and 38% of the respondents were rather or not at all satisfied. 84% (including 42% completely satisfied and 42% generally satisfied) of Reform Party voters, 55% (12% and 42%) of Isamaa voters, 47% (11% and 36%) of EKRE voters, 42% (4% and 38%) of Social Democrats' voters, 36% (10% and 26%) of Estonia 200 voters and 34% (4% and 30%) of the Centre Party voters were satisfied with the result.

According to a survey conducted by Kantar Emor on behalf of Postimees, when explaining their voting decision, Reform Party voters most often agreed with the statement that "the program and promises coincided with my worldview" (53%) and "I have always supported this party" (48%). Centre Party voters either said that "I am always supported this party" (48%) or that "the program and promises coincided with my worldview" (41%). EKRE voters mostly said that "the program and promises coincided with my worldview" (68%) and sometimes that it's a "reliable/pleasant party" (37%). Isamaa voters agreed with the statements "the program and promises matched my worldview" (42%) and "trustworthy/pleasant candidate" (41%) when describing their vote. Social Democrats voters agreed that "the program and promises matched my worldview" (52%) and that they voted for a "trustworthy/pleasant candidate" (39%). Voters of Estonia 200 mostly agreed that "the program and promises coincided with my worldview" (68%) and that it's a "reliable/pleasant political party" (34%). People who didn't vote mostly explained that "I am disappointed in politics/politicians / nothing changes anyway" (43%), "the campaign/agitation has become distasteful" (32%) and some said that they simply have "no interest in politics" (29%).

== Government formation ==
Having won the most seats, the Reform Party took the lead in forming a new government. Kallas stated that she would be seeking a three-party coalition with Isamaa and the Social Democratic Party, or a two-party coalition with the Centre Party.

On 6 March, the Reform Party announced that they would begin talks with the Centre Party. Two days later the Centre Party declined the offer, citing differences of opinion on tax matters and claiming that the Reform Party's demands were too ultimatum-like.

After the Centre Party's rejection, the Reform Party invited the Social Democrats and Isamaa to negotiations. The Reform party had previously said that the poor relationship between two in the previous government would be unhelpful for a future coalition.

On 11 March, the Centre Party announced that it would begin parallel coalition talks with Isamaa and the Conservative People's Party, while criticizing the Reform Party of "extreme uncertainty" in formation of a coalition. Isamaa rejected the Reform Party's proposal and accepted the Centre Party's proposal. At the same time the Conservative People's Party also decided to begin coalition talks with Centre and Isamaa.

=== Coalition attempt by the Centre Party ===
After having turned down an offer by the Reform party for coalition talks, the head of the Centre Party, Jüri Ratas, entered into talks with Isamaa and the Conservative People's Party (EKRE), the latter being widely considered a far-right party. Ratas had previously ruled out forming a coalition with EKRE during the election campaign because of its hostile views.

When I said before that it would be impossible for me to cooperate with a political party which cuts heads off, doesn't agree to certain nationalities or races, then EKRE has indeed said those things.

— Jüri Ratas, talking about EKRE in November 2018

The subsequent reversal of his stance and the inclusion of EKRE by Ratas in coalition talks after the elections was met with local and international criticism. In a poll conducted after the start of the coalition talks, the party of Jüri Ratas further lost support.

Critics of the decision to include the Conservative People's Party in a coalition government claimed that Ratas is willing to sacrifice the Centre Party's values, the confidence of Centre Party voters and the stability of the country to keep his position as prime minister. Ratas has countered that his first duty is to look for ways to get his party included in the government in order to be able to work for the benefit of his voters, and that the coalition would continue to firmly support the EU and NATO, and would be sending out messages of tolerance.

Some key members and popular candidates of Ratas' Centre Party have been critical of the decision, with Raimond Kaljulaid leaving the party's governing board in protest. Yana Toom, a member of the party and a party representative in the European Parliament, expressed criticism of the decision. Mihhail Kõlvart, popular among Russian-speaking voters, said the Centre Party cannot govern with the Conservative People's policy on languages in Estonia.

The decision to include the Conservative People's Party (EKRE) was also criticised in a letter written by Guy Verhofstadt, leader of the ALDE group in the European Parliament (the group in which Ratas' Centre Party is a member), suggesting that Ratas should break off coalition talks with the national-conservative EKRE. Ratas criticised Verhofstadt's letter in the Estonian media.

Brussels should not dictate to Estonia what our new coalition should be like.

— Jüri Ratas, head of the Centre Party, in response to a plea by Guy Verhofstadt to not include EKRE in the coalition.

On 6 April, coalition negotiations ended between the Centre Party, EKRE, and Isamaa, after the parties agreed on a coalition plan. The parties agreed that Jüri Ratas would retain the role of prime minister and that there would be four name and role changes to ministerial portfolios. The parties also agreed that the new cabinet will contain fifteen ministries (including the Prime Minister), with each party receiving a total of five ministries. It was the first time that a far-right party entered Estonia's government.

On 16 April, President Kersti Kaljulaid officially gave Jüri Ratas the mandate to form the next government, after Kallas failed to get parliament's approval to form a government.

=== Coalition attempt by the Reform Party ===
After the announcement, the leader of Reform, Kaja Kallas, who was tasked first by President Kersti Kaljulaid to form a coalition, said that she intended to hold a vote in the Riigikogu on 15 April on a coalition deal that she was trying to form. Kallas stated that she was considering two options, either inviting another party (except EKRE) to join the coalition or forming a minority government with the Social Democrats. There was also another possible option, with Reform forming a coalition with the Social Democrats and receiving backing from some Centre and Isamaa MPs who expressed their opposition about forming a government with EKRE, but "Kallas has not said that such a set-up was on the cards."

=== Coalition voting process ===
On 15 April, Estonia's parliament voted against the Reform Party's coalition attempt, with 45 MPs voting in favor, 53 voting against, 2 abstentions, and 1 absent.

On 17 April, Estonia's parliament approved the proposed coalition between Centre, EKRE and Isamaa, with a vote of 55–44, giving Jüri Ratas the chance to form a government.

Jüri Ratas' second cabinet, containing the Centre Party, EKRE and Isamaa, was sworn in on 29 April 2019.

=== 2021 change in government ===
On 25 January 2021, after the resignation of Jüri Ratas as prime minister following a scandal, Kallas formed a Reform-led coalition government with the Centre Party, making her the first female prime minister in Estonia's history.
