= Kert Kingo =

Estonian politician (born 1968)

Minister of Foreign Trade and Information Technology
- In office 16 May 2019 – 25 October 2019
- Prime Minister: Jüri Ratas
- Preceded by: Marti Kuusik
- Succeeded by: Kaimar Karu

Personal details
- Born: 5 March 1968 (age 58)
- Party: Conservative People's Party of Estonia

Kert Kingo (born 5 March 1968 in Tartu) is an Estonian politician. She served as Minister of Foreign Trade and Information Technology in the second cabinet of Jüri Ratas from 16 May 2019 to 25 October 2019. She resigned after lying over the appointment of an advisor. Kaimar Karu was appointed as her successor. She is affiliated with the Conservative People's Party of Estonia.

== Fraud ==
The Estonian Supreme Court ruled on 31. March 2025 not to hear the appeal of Kert Kingo (EKRE), which meant Kingo had to step down from the Riigikogu and also the previous ruling by the circuit court remained in force, sentencing Kingo to a suspended prison term of one year and nine months. An earlier ruling by the Harju County Court found Kert Kingo and attorney Martin Traat guilty of fraud.

The Office of the Prosecutor General launched a criminal investigation into Kert Kingo after the newspaper Õhtuleht discovered in 2021 that Kingo had submitted invoices from a law firm for reimbursement as parliamentary expenses, which were suspected to be falsified. Prosecutors alleged that Kingo used falsified invoices to have the Riigikogu reimburse legal expenses incurred by individuals unconnected to her parliamentary work. Attorney-at-law Martin Traat was charged with falsifying the invoices, having had his law office staff draft documents containing false information based on Kingo's instructions.

Political offices
Preceded by Marti Kuusik	Minister of Entrepreneurship and Information Technology; 2019–2019	Succeeded by Kaimar Karu
