= Jüri Ratas's second cabinet =

Government of Estonia from 2019 to 2021

Jüri Ratas' second cabinet
- 50th Cabinet of Estonia

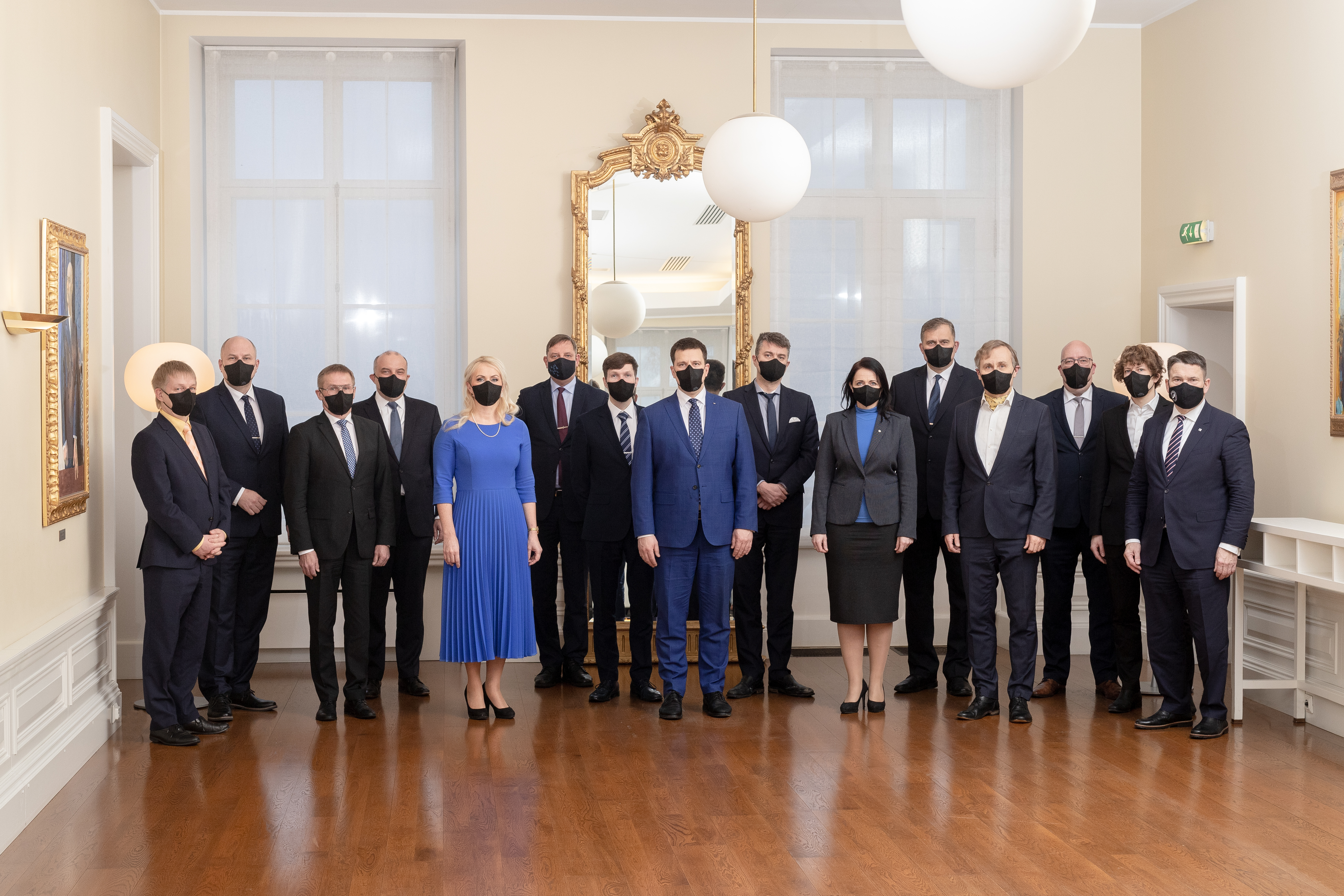
- Date formed: 29 April 2019
- Date dissolved: 14 January 2021

People and organisations
- Head of state: Kersti Kaljulaid
- Head of government: Jüri Ratas
- No. of ministers: 15
- Ministers removed: 8
- Total no. of members: 23
- Member parties: Centre; EKRE; Isamaa
- Status in legislature: Majority cabinet
- Opposition parties: Reform; SDE

History
- Election: 2019 election
- Predecessor: Jüri Ratas's first cabinet
- Successor: Kaja Kallas's first cabinet

Jüri Ratas's second cabinet, colloquially often referred to as EKREIKE (Note: A pun name combined of the acronyms of the three participating parties – the Conservative People's Party of Estonia (EKRE), Isamaa (I) and the Centre Party (KE), with the linguistic implication of ike (yoke), a word also used metaphorically for an oppressive, enslaving power or government.), was the 50th cabinet of Estonia, in office from 29 April 2019 to 14 January 2021. It was a centre-right to right-wing coalition cabinet of the Centre Party, right-wing populist Conservative People's Party (EKRE) and conservative Isamaa.

== History ==
Following the defeat for the sitting Ratas's first cabinet at the 2019 elections and the loss of majority in the parliament Centre Party initiated coalition talks with the third largest Conservative People's Party and fourth largest Isamaa. Although the election-winning Reform Party offered to form a coalition with Jüri Ratas's Centre Party, Ratas turned down the offer. This left the winners of the elections, Reform Party, with no chance to form a majority cabinet. Reform Party leader Kaja Kallas, however went on to propose a minority cabinet formed by Reform and the Social Democrats, but it did not gain the necessary number of votes in the parliament. The coalition partners nonetheless faced three rebel MPs with Centre MP Raimond Kaljulaid quitting the Centre Party in protest against the inclusion of EKRE in the coalition.

On 17 April 2019, the new cabinet got approval of Riigikogu with the support of 55 out of 101 MPs with one Isamaa rebel MP and former Centre MP Kaljulaid voting against with the opposition.

Ratas resigned as prime minister on the evening of 12 January 2021, in the wake of the Porto Franco corruption scandal and the comments by his coalition partners about the validity of the 2020 US elections, with the government as a whole resigning two days later. The cabinet continued to act as a caretaker government until the Kaja Kallas's first cabinet was sworn in on 26 January. The party leaders of EKRE accused the "deep state" of orchestrating the government's fall to reverse the party's goals, specifically a planned marriage referendum, using the corruption scandal as a front.

== Policies ==
The coalition agreement declared as its highest goal to secure the existence of Estonian people and an Estonia that is fortified and well-defended. Among the priorities of the government were reducing inequality between cities and countryside while moving closer to direct democracy.

The government adopted a controversial pension reform that turned the second pillar into a voluntary system, intending to give participants more control over their savings while creating a more competitive market to improve returns and cut fees. The formerly mandatory second pillar had been criticized by some of its opponents as essentially turning Estonians into slaves to an international banking system and the reform was compared to abolition of serfdom in the 19th century. On the other hand, Kaja Kallas called the pension reform a "crime against the future" and called upon people to protest against it. Under Minister of Finance Helme, Estonia also emitted sovereign bonds for the first time after 18 years to finance the government programs.

Another priority for the government was adoption of family-friendly policies with an objective to increase birth rates of ethnic Estonians. Government spokespeople presented this as an alternative to immigration that allows the percentage of ethnic Estonians to rise. Emphasis was put on a program to facilitate the return of Estonians from Finland. The government agreed on a referendum that would have defined marriage as being a union between a man and a woman, which would have created a constitutional prohibition against same-sex marriage. The referendum would have taken place in October 2021.

The government attempted to restrict both legal and illegal migration into Estonia. Many restrictions were targeted against foreigners coming to work and study in Estonia, especially those from outside the European Union. During the COVID-19 crisis, the government temporarily banned entrance of cheap labor force into Estonia, a move that was often seen as relating more to migration policy than the quarantine. The Estonian Border Guard was restored as a separate structure under the Police and Border Guard Board.

In foreign policy, Estonia moved closer to the Visegrád Group. Together with Hungary, Estonia declared the Global Compact for Migration a "dangerous document" and cooperated against its implementation while also working together to halt the European migrant crisis. In 2020, Estonia hosted a summit of the Three Seas Initiative. The government also implemented a new foreign policy strategy that gave additional focus to what it defines as "Estonian national and cultural interests", giving attention to Estonian diaspora and turning more awareness to indigenous rights. Estonia's defence budget was raised. It included increasing the armament of the Estonian Navy by introducing anti-ship missiles and naval mines while also making plans for procuring mid-range surface-to-air missiles.

The government launched an ambitious program of highway construction, planning to reconstruct national roads 1, 2 and 4 into first-class dual carriageways while paving every single local road with a daily traffic of 50 or more cars. They also invested heavily into regional rail transport, initiating the restoration of Haapsalu railway (closed to passenger traffic in 1995 and demolished afterwards) and were aiming to convert the whole of the Estonian passenger rail network into electric railways by 2028. Meanwhile the project of Rail Baltica caused controversy within government, with EKRE opposing it on the grounds of environmental protection and supposed economic inefficiency.

The government, especially Minister of Finance Martin Helme, attempted to open an investigation into the Danske Bank money laundering scandal, hiring American lawyer and former FBI director Louis Freeh to investigate it. Helme has implicated previous Estonian political elite in allowing the money laundering to continue. The government also launched a new investigation into the sinking of the MS Estonia in 1994, alluding to conspiracy theories according to which the ship sank as a result of an explosion or collision with a military submarine.

The government financed from state budget reconstruction of many churches while also giving money to protect pagan sacred groves. A decision to finance an anti-abortion NGO with €171,000 after a proposal by EKRE caused controversy. They also planned to finance erection of a statue of Roman von Ungern-Sternberg, although the initiators of the monument declined public funding.

== Incidents and controversies ==
=== Coalition formation ===
Ratas had previously ruled out forming a coalition with EKRE during the election campaign because of differences between their views.

"When I said before that it would be impossible for me to cooperate with a political party which cuts heads off, doesn't agree to certain nationalities or races, then EKRE has indeed said those things."

— Ratas talking about EKRE in November 2018, widely interpreted as ruling out a coalition with EKRE.

The subsequent reversal of his stance and the inclusion of EKRE by Ratas in coalition talks after the elections was met with local and international criticism. In a poll conducted after the start of the coalition talks, Ratas's Centre Party further lost support.

=== Gender equality ===
The cabinet faced criticism for having only two women, Centre MP Mailis Reps and Isamaa MP Riina Solman, with EKRE fielding a full male line-up for their portfolios. The party later named a female minister, Kert Kingo, after the resignation of Marti Kuusik.

EKRE party leader and Minister of the Interior Mart Helme faced criticism for calling president Kersti Kaljulaid an "emotionally heated woman".

=== Freedom of speech ===
A public debate on freedom of speech started after controversial actions by the new cabinet parties. On 28 March 2019, EKRE's proposed new Minister of Finance, Martin Helme, demanded that Estonian Public Broadcasting (ERR) would ban and punish journalists who had criticised his party. On 22 April, journalist Vilja Kiisler left Postimees, one of the biggest newspapers in Estonia, due to differences with the paper's newly appointed editor-in-chief on her op-ed about the policies of EKRE. The editor-in-chief Peeter Helme is the nephew of the leader of the Conservative People's Party Mart Helme and the newspaper is owned by a member and financier of the third government party Pro Partia. On 26 April, journalist Ahto Lobjakas announced that he was quitting the ERR where, he said, he was given a choice between self-censorship and leaving. On the swearing-in of the new cabinet president Kersti Kaljulaid wore a sweatshirt emblazoned with the slogan Sõna on vaba (the word/speech is free) as a statement of the importance of the freedom of speech.

On 14 May 2019, Minister of the Interior Mart Helme accused ERR's United States correspondent Maria-Ann Rohemäe of deceiving and lying. ERR responded with public statement in support of their journalist and condemning attacks against journalists.

=== "OK" hand gesture ===
EKRE party chairman and Minister of the Interior Mart Helme, and his son, Minister of Finance Martin Helme caused some controversy by publicly flashing the "OK" hand gesture which has been come to be seen as a white supremacist symbol. MP Jaak Madison commented afterwards that the symbols were used as "pure trolling" in order to rile the media and the party’s opponents.

In May 2019, when Marine Le Pen was visiting Estonia for discussions with EKRE, MP Ruuben Kaalep and Le Pen took a selfie together with both flashing the same gesture.

=== Resignation of Marti Kuusik ===
The following morning after the elections, EKRE's proposed new Minister of Foreign Trade and Information Technology, Marti Kuusik was caught by the police speeding (74 km/h in 50 km/h zone) and driving under the influence. Both prime minister Jüri Ratas, and EKRE stated that they do not see this as a reason to replace Kuusik.

On 29 April 2019, reports emerged of alleged history of Kuusik's domestic violence including breaking his wife's arm bone twice. Kuusik denied the accusations. Following the emergency meeting with Kuusik and EKRE's delegation, Ratas decided that there is no need to replace Kuusik and that he can take the oath of office. Before Kuusik took the oath, president Kaljulaid left the room, leaving Kuusik to bow for the empty seat. Kaljulaid promised to be the first to apologize to Kuusik should the accusations not be true.

On the same day, a criminal investigation was launched to determine whether the accusations were true. On 30 April 2019 the Director General of the Police and the Prosecutor General gave Ratas an overview of the collected evidence after which Ratas handed over Kuusik's letter of resignation to the President. Kuusik denied all the accusations, reasoning that he only resigned to ensure the stability of the government and to protect his family while focusing on disproving the accusations. EKRE party chairman Mart Helme heavily criticized the ousting of Kuusik, calling it a "witch hunt".

Afterwards, EKRE struggled to find a nominee, with a number of people declining the offer. Finally, two weeks after Kuusik's resignation, Kert Kingo was appointed as a replacement for Kuusik.

=== Resignation of Kert Kingo ===
On 25 October 2019, Minister of Foreign Trade and IT Kert Kingo resigned after being caught lying in front of the Riigikogu about the appointment of her new adviser who had posted sexually offensive remarks on Facebook. On 2 November, Kaimar Karu was appointed as Kingo's successor.

=== Dismissal of Mart Järvik ===
On 25 November 2019, Prime Minister Ratas proposed the dismissal of the Minister of Rural Affairs Mart Järvik after a commission of inquiry led by the Secretary of State Taimar Peterkop had found that Järvik had exceeded his authority and made inconsistent statements regarding findings of Listeria bacteria at a fish packing plant. After Järvik's dismissal by the President, he was followed in the position by Arvo Aller.

=== Recalling of Kaimar Karu ===
On the morning of 17 April 2020, Minister of Foreign Trade and Information Technology Kaimar Karu announced on social media that EKRE chairman Mart Helme has recalled him from the government. Helme accused Karu for not respecting party values, including their anti-immigration views. Karu had been under strain for not supporting changes made to the Aliens Act. Raul Siem was appointed as a replacement for Karu.

=== Resignation of Rene Kokk ===
On 4 November 2020, Minister of the Environment Rene Kokk resigned for health reasons, with both Prime Minister Ratas and Martin Helme stressed that his resignation had nothing to do with the unfinished forestry development plan. On 12 November, Rain Epler was confirmed as the new minister. Epler does not believe that the global warming is primarily caused by human activity and supports nuclear power.

=== Resignation of Mart Helme ===
On 9 November 2020, Minister of the Interior Mart Helme, a supporter of Donald Trump, resigned due to political pressure after he and his son, Minister of Finance, Martin Helme had in their weekly radio show called 2020 United States presidential elections fraudulent, rigged by the "deep state" and US president elect Joe Biden a "corrupt character". On 18 November 2020, Alar Laneman was confirmed as the new minister.

=== Resignation of Mailis Reps ===
On 20 November 2020, Minister of Education and Research Mailis Reps resigned due to the media criticism on her usage of the official ministerial vehicles for her personal purposes. She was replaced by Minister of Public Administration Jaak Aab, with Anneli Ott inheriting Aab's former post.

== Ministers ==
The coalition agreed to continue with fifteen portfolios equally allocated between the parties with each party holding five.

Cabinet
Portfolio	Minister	Took office	Left office	Party
Government's Office
Prime Minister	Jüri Ratas	23 November 2016	26 January 2021	Centre
Ministry of Finance
Minister of Finance	Martin Helme	29 April 2019	26 January 2021	EKRE
Minister of Public Administration	Jaak Aab	29 April 2019	25 November 2020	Centre
Minister of Public Administration	Anneli Ott	25 November 2020	26 January 2021	Centre
Ministry of Foreign Affairs
Minister of Foreign Affairs	Urmas Reinsalu	29 April 2019	26 January 2021	Isamaa
Ministry of Economic Affairs and Communications
Minister of Economic Affairs and Infrastructure	Taavi Aas	29 April 2019	to the next cabinet	Centre
Minister of Foreign Trade and Information Technology	Marti Kuusik	29 April 2019	30 April 2019	EKRE
Minister of Foreign Trade and Information Technology	Kert Kingo	16 May 2019	25 October 2019	EKRE
Minister of Foreign Trade and Information Technology	Kaimar Karu	2 November 2019	17 April 2020	Independent
Minister of Foreign Trade and Information Technology	Raul Siem	20 April 2020	26 January 2021	EKRE
Ministry of Justice
Minister of Justice	Raivo Aeg	29 April 2019	26 January 2021	Isamaa
Ministry of Defence
Minister of Defence	Jüri Luik	12 June 2017	26 January 2021	Isamaa
Ministry of Culture
Minister of Culture	Tõnis Lukas	29 April 2019	26 January 2021	Isamaa
Ministry of the Interior
Minister of the Interior	Mart Helme	29 April 2019	9 November 2020	EKRE
Minister of the Interior	Alar Laneman	18 November 2020	26 January 2021	EKRE
Minister of Population Affairs	Riina Solman	29 April 2019	26 January 2021	Isamaa
Ministry of Education and Research
Minister of Education and Research	Mailis Reps	23 November 2016	21 November 2020	Centre
Minister of Education and Research	Jaak Aab	25 November 2020	26 January 2021	Centre
Ministry of the Environment
Minister of the Environment	Rene Kokk	29 April 2019	7 November 2020	EKRE
Minister of the Environment	Rain Epler	16 November 2020	26 January 2021	EKRE
Ministry of Social Affairs
Minister of Social Affairs	Tanel Kiik	29 April 2019	26 January 2021	Centre
Ministry of Rural Affairs
Minister of Rural Affairs	Mart Järvik	29 April 2019	25 November 2019	EKRE
Minister of Rural Affairs	Arvo Aller	10 December 2019	26 January 2021	EKRE

1. Kaimar Karu represented EKRE as an independent politician.

== Notes ==
Preceded by Jüri Ratas's first cabinet	Government of Estonia; 2019–2021	Succeeded by Kaja Kallas's first cabinet
