= Riina Solman =

Estonian politician (born 1972)

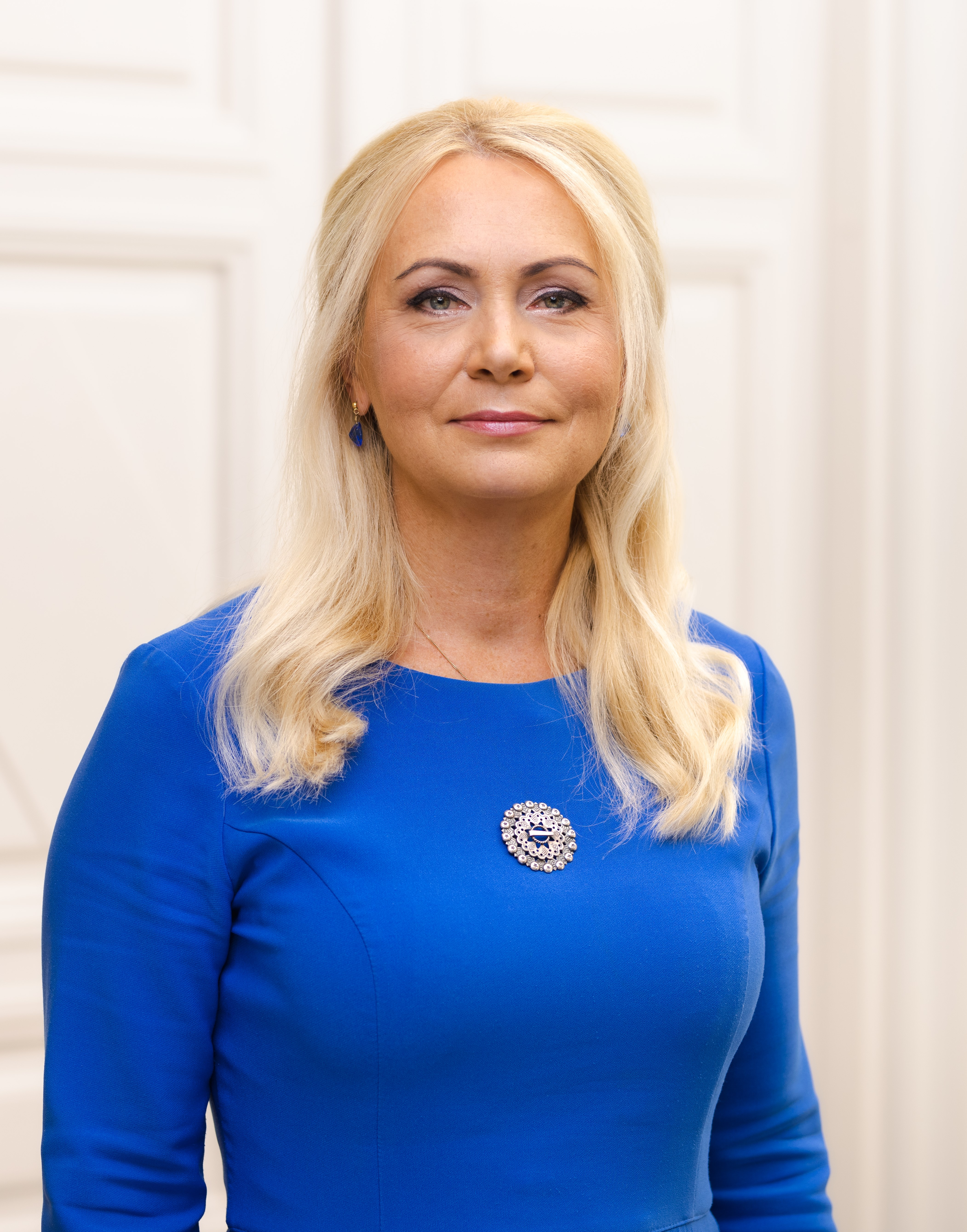
- Riina Solman

Minister of Public Administration
- In office 18 July 2022 – 17 April 2023
- Prime Minister: Kaja Kallas
- Preceded by: Jaak Aab
- Succeeded by: Office disestablished

Minister of Population Affairs
- In office 29 April 2019 – 26 January 2021
- Prime Minister: Jüri Ratas
- Preceded by: Office established
- Succeeded by: Office disestablished

Personal details
- Born: 23 June 1972 (age 54) Viljandi, then part of Estonian SSR, Soviet Union
- Party: Isamaa
- Education: Tallinn University

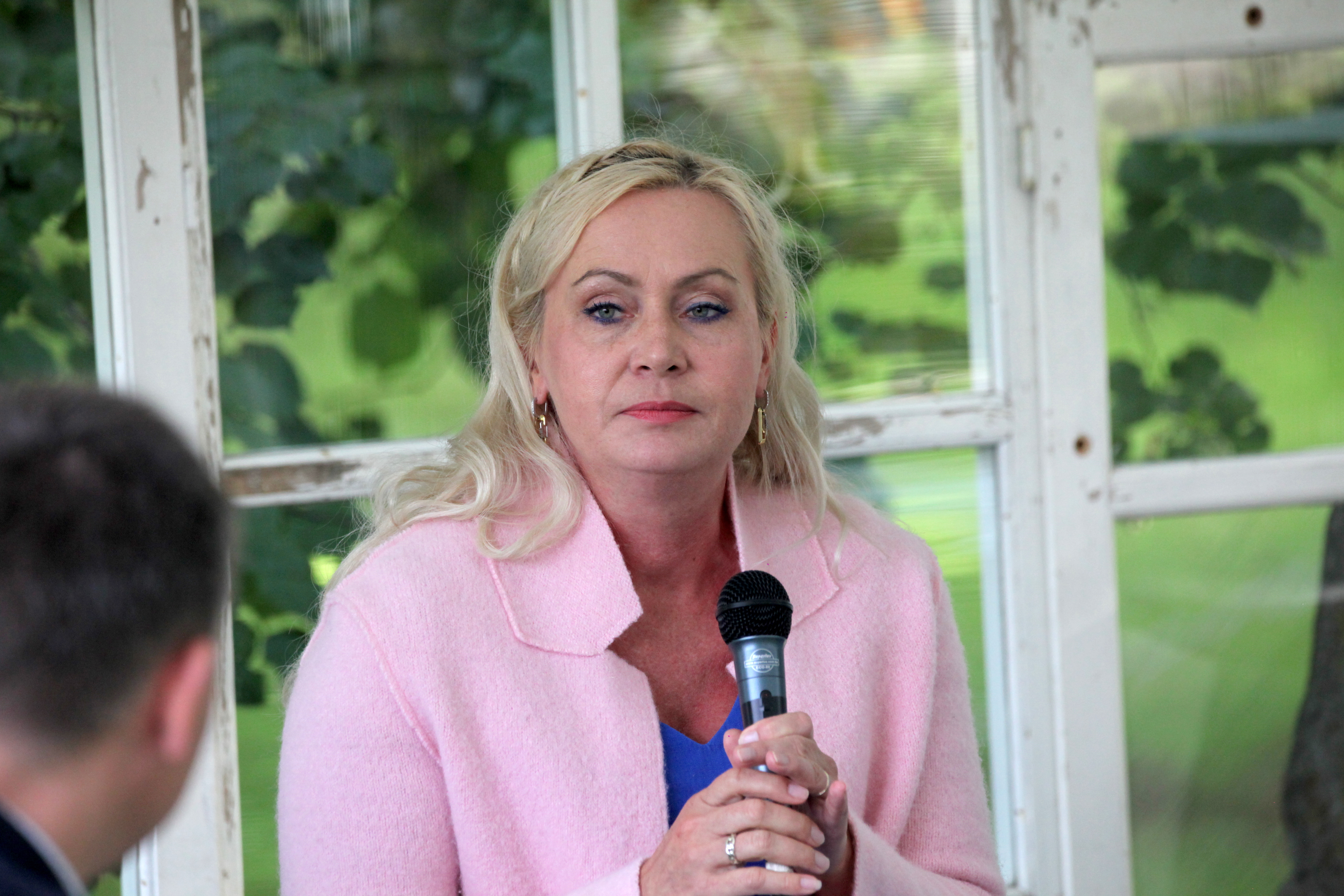
Riina Solman at the Opinion Festival 2021 in Paide, Estonia

Riina Solman (Estonian: [ˈriːnɑ ˈsolmɑn]; born 23 June 1972) is an Estonian politician. She served as Minister of Population Affairs in the second cabinet of Jüri Ratas from 29 April 2019 to 26 January 2021. The office of Minister of Population Affairs was removed in the cabinet of Prime Minister Kaja Kallas.

She stood for the Riigikogu in the 2023 elections, received 1773 votes in constituency No 1 (Haabersti, Põhja-Tallinn and Kristiine) and was elected.
