= Kaja Kallas's first cabinet =

Government of Estonia from 2021 to 2022

- 51st Cabinet of Estonia
- 2021-2022
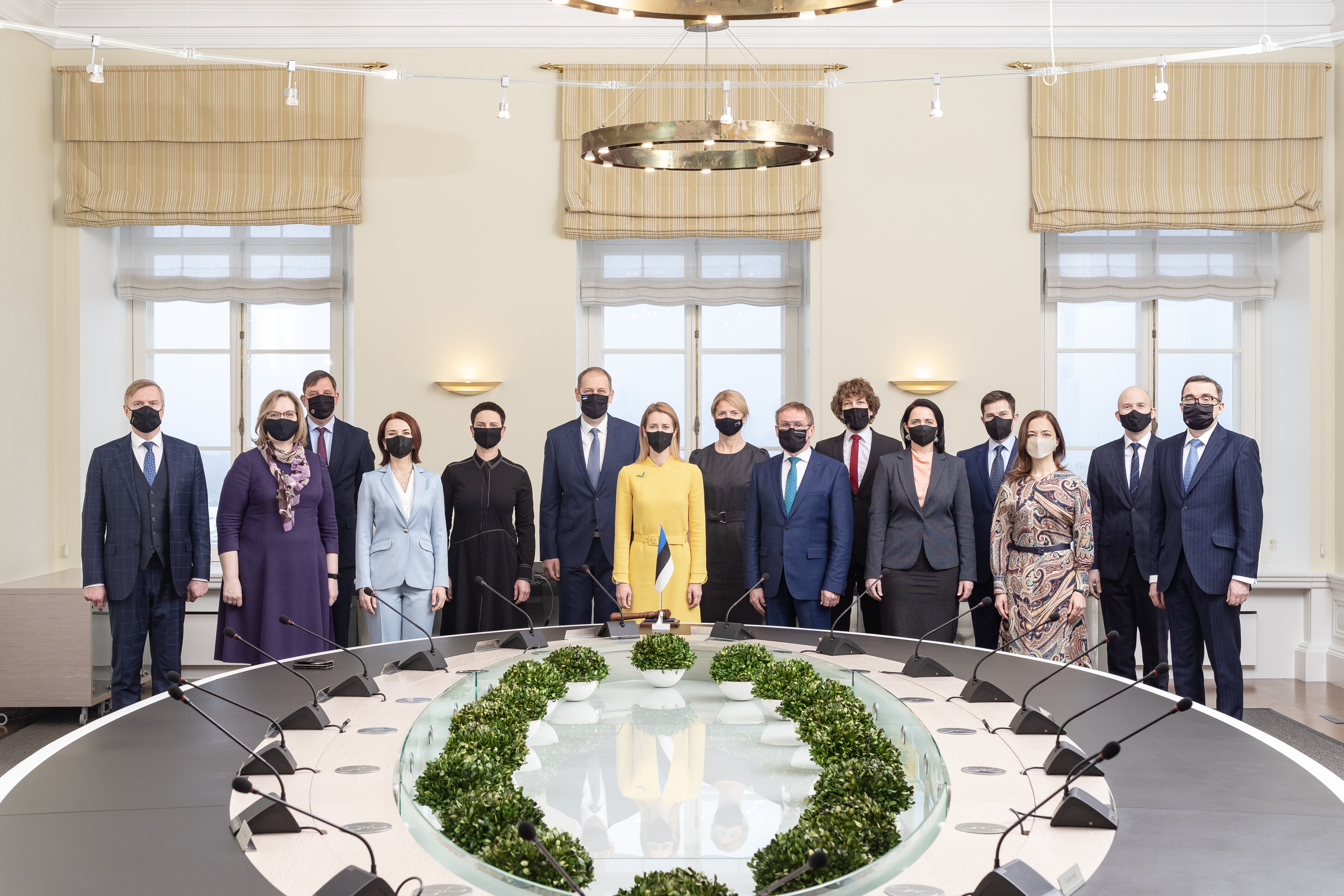
- Date formed: 26 January 2021
- Date dissolved: 14 July 2022

People and organisations
- Head of state: Kersti Kaljulaid; Alar Karis
- Head of government: Kaja Kallas
- No. of ministers: 15
- Ministers removed: 9
- Total no. of members: 17
- Member parties: Reform Party; Centre Party (until 3 June 2022)
- Status in legislature: Majority cabinet (until 3 June 2022); Minority cabinet (from 3 June 2022)
- Opposition parties: Centre Party (from 3 June 2022); Conservative People's Party; Isamaa; Social Democrats

History
- Election: 2019 election
- Predecessor: Jüri Ratas' second cabinet
- Successor: Kaja Kallas's second cabinet

Kaja Kallas's first cabinet was the Cabinet of Estonia between 26 January 2021 and 14 July 2022. It was a grand coalition cabinet of the Reform Party and the Centre Party until 3 June 2022 when Kallas dismissed Centre Party ministers from government after several weeks of disputes between the two parties.

== Background ==
The cabinet was formed after the previous cabinet led by the Centre Party resigned on 14 January 2021 following the resignation of the prime minister Jüri Ratas in the wake of a corruption scandal.

From the very beginning, pundits stated several possible coalitions, among them were Reform Party–Centre Party, Reform Party–Isamaa–SDE, Centre Party–EKRE–Isamaa, Reform Party–EKRE. On 14 January 2021, negotiations started between the Reform Party and the Centre Party. Although it was seen as a surprise to many, the leaders of Isamaa and EKRE (Helir-Valdor Seeder and Martin Helme, respectively) stated that the Centre Party members were probing a possible coalition with the Reform Party since the end of 2020.

The cabinet received its mandate on 25 January 2021.

This cabinet was the first coalition government between the Reform Party and the Centre Party since 2003. Also, it became the most gender-equal cabinet in Estonia's history.

The cabinet led Estonia in the times of health crisis of COVID-19 pandemic and energy and security crisis caused by 2022 Russian invasion of Ukraine. Estonia became one of the largest donors of weapons for Ukraine per capita and received over 40,000 Ukrainian refugees.

== Ministers ==
The coalition agreed on 14 ministers in addition to the prime minister with seven each for Reform and Center.

In November 2021, Centre's Anneli Ott announced her resignation after criticism related to her not allowing herself to be vaccinated against COVID-19, citing disagreements with the Reform Party on restrictions. Her resignation revealed deeper disagreements between the two coalition parties regarding COVID-19 restrictions and vaccination.

On 2 June 2022, Kallas dismissed the seven ministers of the Centre Party after several weeks of deadlock, during which her coalition partner voted with the far-right EKRE opposition against an education bill. Continuing with a minority cabinet, the Reform Party called up the conservative Isamaa and the Social Democrats for talks on a possible new coalition. On July 8, the three parties announced that they agreed on forming a new coalition government. The new coalition was given a mandate by the Riigikogu on July 15 and became Kaja Kallas's second cabinet.

Portfolio	Minister	Took office	Left office	Party
Government's Office
Prime Minister	Kaja Kallas	26 January 2021	to the next cabinet	Reform
Ministry of Finance
Minister of Finance	Keit Pentus-Rosimannus	26 January 2021	to the next cabinet	Reform
Minister of Public Administration	Jaak Aab	26 January 2021	3 June 2022	Centre
Ministry of Foreign Affairs
Minister of Foreign Affairs	Eva-Maria Liimets	26 January 2021	3 June 2022	Centre
Ministry of Economic Affairs and Communications
Minister of Economic Affairs and Infrastructure	Taavi Aas	29 April 2019	3 June 2022	Centre
Minister of Entrepreneurship and Information Technology	Andres Sutt	26 January 2021	18 July 2022	Reform
Ministry of Justice
Minister of Justice	Maris Lauri	26 January 2021	18 July 2022	Reform
Ministry of Defence
Minister of Defence	Kalle Laanet	26 January 2021	18 July 2022	Reform
Ministry of Culture
Minister of Culture	Anneli Ott	26 January 2021	3 November 2021	Centre
Minister of Culture	Tiit Terik	8 November 2021	3 June 2022	Centre
Ministry of the Interior
Minister of the Interior	Kristian Jaani	26 January 2021	3 June 2022	Centre
Ministry of Education and Research
Minister of Education and Research	Liina Kersna	26 January 2021	18 July 2022	Reform
Ministry of the Environment
Minister of the Environment	Tõnis Mölder	26 January 2021	18 November 2021	Centre
Minister of the Environment	Erki Savisaar	18 November 2021	3 June 2022	Centre
Ministry of Social Affairs
Minister of Health and Labour	Tanel Kiik	26 January 2021	3 June 2022	Centre
Minister of Social Protection	Signe Riisalo	26 January 2021	to the next cabinet	Reform
Ministry of Rural Affairs
Minister of Rural Affairs	Urmas Kruuse	26 January 2021	to the next cabinet	Reform

Preceded by Jüri Ratas's second cabinet	Government of Estonia; 2021–2022	Succeeded by Kaja Kallas's second cabinet
