= Kallas' cabinet =

Kallas' cabinet may refer to:

- Siim Kallas' cabinet
- Kaja Kallas' cabinet (disambiguation)
