= Anneli Ott =

Estonian politician (born 1976)

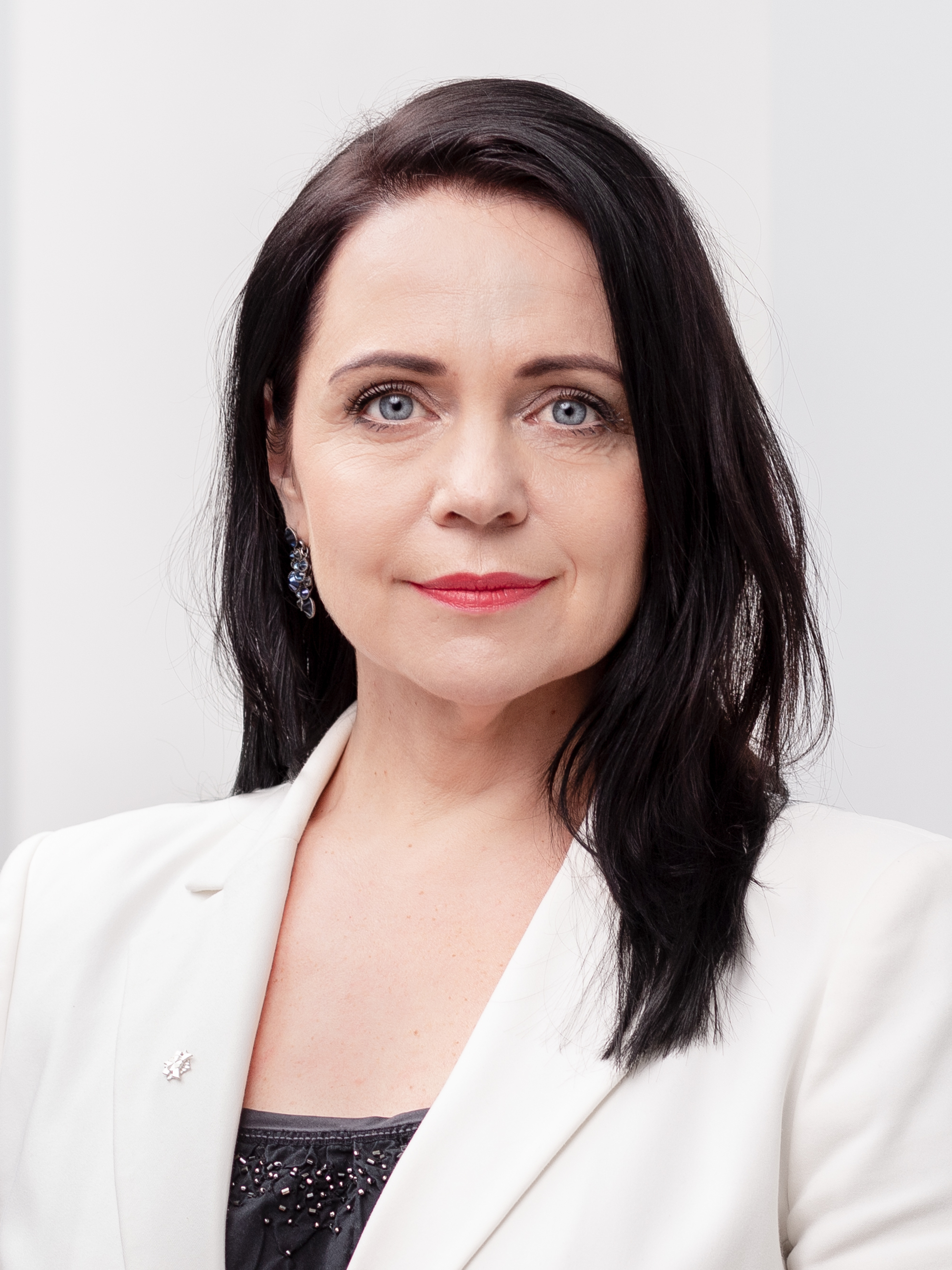
- Anneli Ott (2021)

Minister of Culture
- In office 26 January 2021 – 3 November 2021
- Prime Minister: Kaja Kallas
- Preceded by: Tõnis Lukas
- Succeeded by: Tiit Terik

Minister of Public Administration
- In office 25 November 2020 – 26 January 2021
- Prime Minister: Jüri Ratas
- Preceded by: Jaak Aab
- Succeeded by: Jaak Aab

Personal details
- Born: 2 May 1976 (age 50) Tartu, then part of Estonian SSR, Soviet Union
- Party: Centre Party
- Education: University of Tartu

Anneli Ott (Estonian: [ˈɑnʲːeli ˈotː]; born 2 May 1976) is an Estonian politician. She served as Minister of Culture in the cabinet of Prime Minister Kaja Kallas.

She previously served as Minister of Public Administration in the second cabinet of Jüri Ratas.

Political offices
Preceded by Jaak Aab	Minister of Public Administration; 2020–2021	Succeeded by Jaak Aab
Preceded by Tõnis Lukas	Minister of Culture; 2021	Succeeded by Tiit Terik
