= Minister of Public Administration (Estonia) =

Estonian cabinet position

The Minister of Public Administration of Estonia (Estonian: Riigihalduse minister) was a minister at the Ministry of Finance (Estonian: Rahandusministeerium) in the Estonian Government.

== List of ministers of public administration ==
Name	Portrait	Party	Term of office		Duration	Prime Minister (Cabinet)
Arto Aas		Reform	9 April 2015	23 November 2016	1 year, 228 days	Rõivas (II)
Mihhail Korb		Centre	23 November 2016	11 June 2017	201 days	Ratas (I)
Jaak Aab		Centre	12 June 2017	2 May 2018	324 days	Ratas (I)
Janek Mäggi		Centre	2 May 2018	29 April 2019	362 days	Ratas (I)
Jaak Aab		Centre	29 April 2019	20 November 2020	1 year, 205 days	Ratas (II)
Anneli Ott		Centre	25 November 2020	26 January 2021	62 days	Ratas (II)
Jaak Aab		Centre	26 January 2021	3 June 2022	1 year, 128 days	Kallas (I)
Riina Solman		Pro Patria	18 July 2022	17 April 2023	273 days	Kallas (II)

== See also ==
- Ministry of Finance
