= Liina Kersna =

Estonian politician and journalist

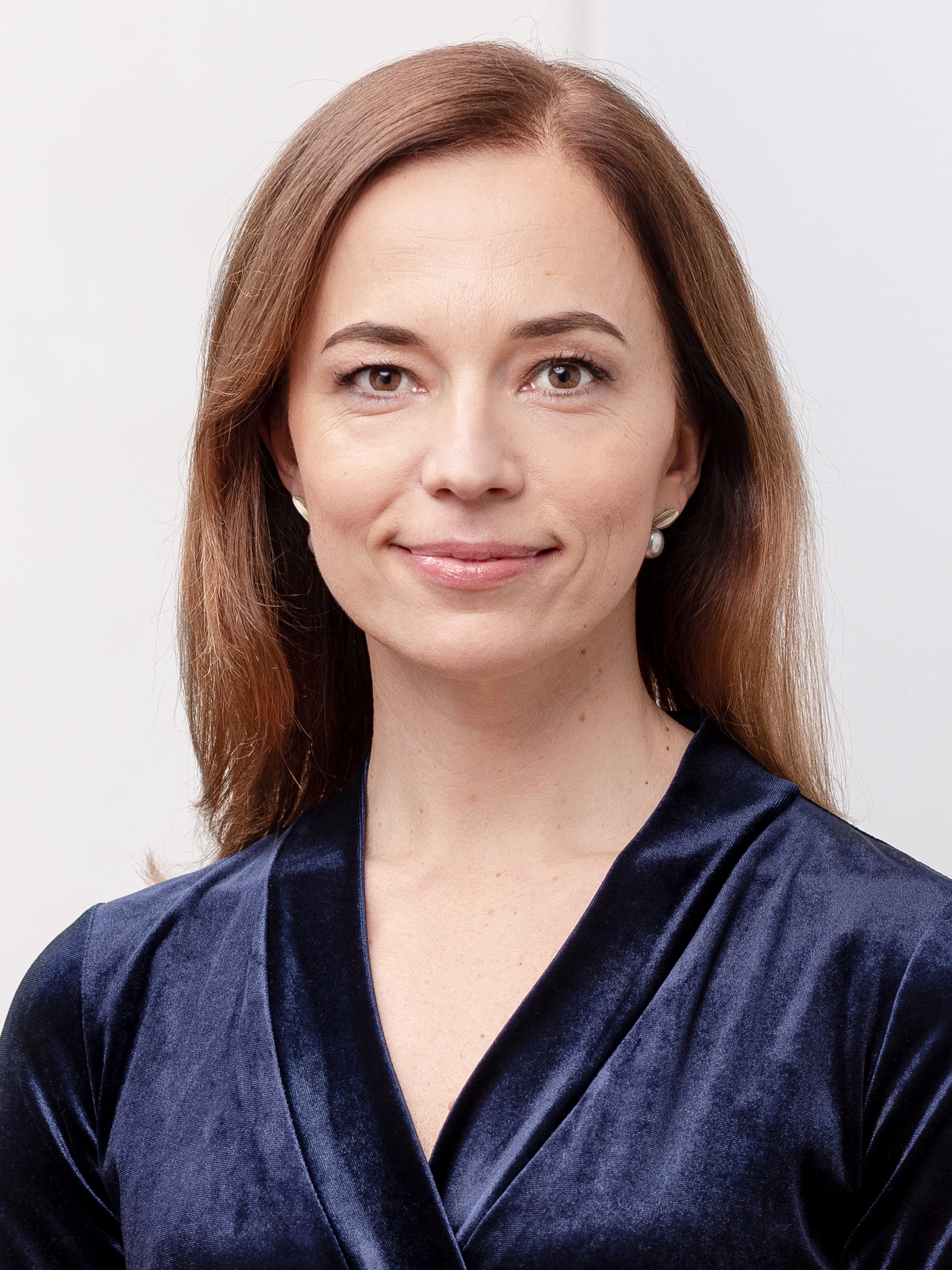
- Liina Kersna in 2021

Minister of Education and Research
- In office 26 January 2021 – 14 July 2022
- Prime Minister: Kaja Kallas
- Preceded by: Jaak Aab
- Succeeded by: Tõnis Lukas

Personal details
- Born: 3 April 1980 (age 46) Tallinn, then part of Estonian SSR, Soviet Union
- Party: Reform Party
- Education: University of Tartu

Liina Kersna (née Lepik; born 3 April 1980) is an Estonian journalist, civil servant and politician. From 2021 to 2022 Kersna was the Minister of Education and Research.

== Biography ==
Kersna graduated from Lasnamäe General Secondary School in 1998 and from the University of Tartu in the field of journalism and public relations in 2005.

She worked as a presenter and editor at Eesti Rahvusringhääling from 1998 to 2002. From 2002 to 2004, she worked as head of public relations of the Federation of Estonian Student Unions. In 2004, she worked as the Chief Specialist at the Press Office of the Ministry of Rural Affairs, as Deputy Director of the Public Relations Department of the Ministry of Agriculture and Forestry of Estonia from 2005 to 2006, and was its head from 2006 to 2007. From 2007 to 2010 and again from 2012 to 2013, Kersna was the Media Advisor to the Government of Estonia; From 2010 to 2012, she was the Director of Government Communications of the Government of Estonia. From 2013 to 2015, she was the head of the office of Advisor to the Prime Minister of the Republic of Estonia.

Kersna has been a member of the Estonian Reform Party since 2015. She has been a member of the Riigikogu since 2015. She was the Minister of Education and Research in Kaja Kallas' first cabinet. Kersna resigned on 30 June 2022 after criminal proceedings were opened up against her in respect of deviations from procurement rules to ensure the supply of rapid coronavirus tests for the schools during the COVID-19 outbreak.

== Personal life ==
Liina Kersna is married to Vahur Kersna, with whom she has a son.
