= Janek Mäggi =

Estonian politician (born 1973)

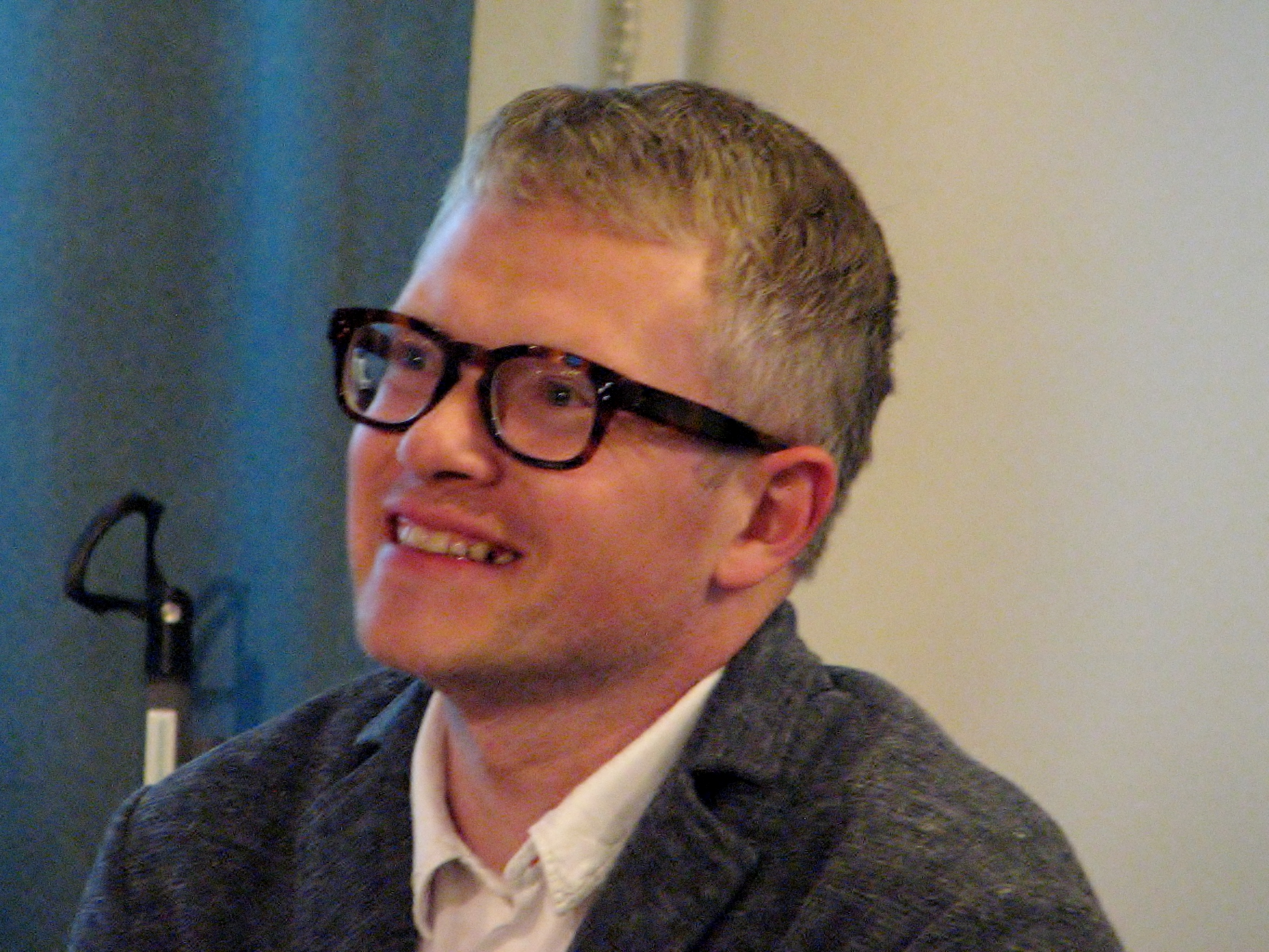

Minister of Public Administration
- In office 2 May 2018 – 29 April 2019
- Prime Minister: Jüri Ratas
- Preceded by: Jaak Aab
- Succeeded by: Jaak Aab

Personal details
- Born: 5 September 1973 (age 53)
- Party: Estonian Centre Party
- Education: University of Tartu

Janek Mäggi (born 5 September 1973) is an Estonian politician, television presenter and writer.

He served as Minister of Public Administration in the first cabinet of Prime Minister Jüri Ratas from 2 May 2018 to 29 April 2019. He is affiliated with the Estonian Centre Party.

In 1999, he graduated from School of Law of the University of Tartu.

Political offices
Preceded by Jaak Aab	Minister of Public Administration; 2018–2019	Succeeded by Jaak Aab
