= Kaja Kallas' cabinet =

Kaja Kallas's cabinet may refer to:

- Kaja Kallas's first cabinet
- Kaja Kallas's second cabinet
- Kaja Kallas's third cabinet
