= Estonian Patriotic Movement =

Estonian political pressure group

The Estonian Patriotic Movement (Estonian: Eesti Rahvuslik Liikumine, ERL) was a political pressure group in Estonia. The group was set up in the middle of 2006 to promote the removal of the monument to the Bronze Soldier of Tallinn from the heart of the Estonian capital, Tallinn. In February 2012, it claimed a membership of 268.

== Politics ==
As of 2007, the primary political positions of the ERL were opposition to building the planned Nord Stream 1 pipeline through the Baltic Sea, dislike for Estonia being a member state of the European Union, support for a NATO military base being installed in Estonia and disdain for the Estonian Centre Party's perceived improper acts.

The movement has also repeatedly expressed displeasure for the Russian Federation's covert influence in Estonia's internal affairs. On June 20, 2007, the movement issued a press release demanding declaring the Russian Ambassador to Estonia, Nikolai Uspenski, a persona non grata based on his repeated attempts to exert such influence. This was triggered by the ambassador's presence at an establishment meeting of Russki Mir in Tallinn.

In February 2012, it was announced that the movement would merge with the People's Union of Estonia to form the Estonian Conservative People's Party.
