= Conservative People's Party of Estonia =

Conservative People's Party of Estonia Eesti Konservatiivne Rahvaerakond
- Abbreviation: EKRE
- Chairman: Martin Helme
- Deputy Chairman: Mart Helme
- Founder: Mart Helme
- Founded: 24 March 2012; 14 years ago (de facto); 29 September 1994; 32 years ago (de jure)
- Merger of: People's Union of Estonia; Estonian Patriotic Movement
- Headquarters: Toompuiestee 27, Tallinn
- Newspaper: Konservatiivide Vaba Sõna
- Youth wing: Blue Awakening (2012–2024); Turning Point Estonia (2025-present)
- Women's wing: EKRE Naisühendus
- Membership (2026): ▼8998
- Ideology: Estonian nationalism; Social conservatism; Right-wing populism
- Political position: Far-right
- European affiliation: Patriots.eu
- European Parliament group: Patriots for Europe (since 2024) (Note: The party was formerly part of the European Conservatives and Reformists Group and the Identity and Democracy Group (2019–2024).)
- Colours: Blue
- Riigikogu: 10 / 101
- Municipalities: 164 / 1,688
- European Parliament: 0 / 7

Party flag

Website
- ekre.ee

EKRE – Conservative People's Party of Estonia (Estonian: EKRE – Eesti Konservatiivne Rahvaerakond, EKRE) is a nationalist and right-wing populist political party in Estonia led by Martin Helme. It was founded in March 2012 with the merger of People's Union of Estonia and Estonian Patriotic Movement while legally remaining the same entity as the People's Union of Estonia. Its first leader, Margo Miljand, served as the chairman until 2013 when he was succeeded by Mart Helme. Its popularity remained low until late 2014, when the party began to draw supporters from the right; in the 2015 Estonian parliamentary election, it passed the electoral threshold and won seats in parliament for the first time. Since then, its support has grown, turning it into one of the largest parties in Estonia. In the 2019 Estonian parliamentary election, EKRE placed third, winning 19 seats in total. Mart was succeeded as party chairman by his son, Martin Helme, in July 2020.

Since its inception, EKRE has been described as a radical right or a far-right party. The party's leadership rejects the left–right political spectrum. Widely described as a nationalist, ultranationalist, and national-conservative party, it opposes immigration, including Russian immigration, into Estonia. The party supports the transition of the public school education, which until now has been provided in Russian to the Russian-speaking Soviet immigrant minority in Estonia, into Estonian-language education, and wishes to implement Swiss-style direct democracy, e.g. popular initiatives. Due to its right-wing populist and anti-Russian rhetoric, it has been described by critics as xenophobic and racist. On social issues, it is traditionalist, while its foreign views are orientated towards Euroscepticism.

== History ==
The party is a descendant of several earlier Estonian nationalist movements and political groups. The Estonian Patriotic Movement (ERL) was a political pressure group founded in 2006. From 2008, the movement was led by Martin Helme. (Note: Mart Helme had formerly been a member of the People's Union of Estonia but was forced to leave the party in 2004 because of his opposition to the relocation of Monument of Lihula and the suppression of protests.) ERL was set up in the middle of 2006 to promote the removal of the "Bronze Soldier of Tallinn", a Stalinist war monument, from the centre of capital city Tallinn. After 2007, the main political positions of the ERL were opposition to the building of the Russian-German Nord Stream 1 pipeline through the Baltic Sea, criticism of the loss of Estonian sovereignty due to membership in the European Union, support for a NATO military base being installed in Estonia, and active opposition to the Estonian Centre Party's pro-Russia policies and other perceived improper acts. The movement repeatedly expressed displeasure for the Russian Federation's covert interference in Estonia's internal affairs. In June 2007, ERL issued a press release demanding the declaration of the Russian Ambassador to Estonia, Nikolai Uspenski, a persona non grata based on his repeated attempts at such interference.

The party (EKRE) was formally founded in March 2012 when an agrarian centrist party People's Union of Estonia and the Estonian Patriotic Movement (ERL) merged. The People's Union had started to look for a possible merging partner already in 2010. The talks then with the Social Democratic Party were concluded and a special congress was convened to approve the merger agreement. However, at the party congress, only 172 delegates out of 412 supported the deal. Following the failed merger attempt, many leading members (MPs) left the party and joined the Social Democrats. In the 2011 parliamentary election, the People's Union did not pass the 5% threshold.

Mart Helme and several of his close allies ran at the election as independent candidates, none of whom passed the threshold necessary for an independent to enter the parliament. After the election, the leader of the People's Union, Margo Miljand, met with Helme. To save the party, Helme advised him to change the party name and alter the program. With links to the nationalist Estonian Patriotic Movement, Helme advised a deal between the two. The movement promised it would help redo the party programme and elect new leaders.

In March 2012, the Estonian Patriotic Movement merged into the People's Union and the latter changed its name to the Conservative People's Party of Estonia. At the assembly in Põltsamaa, where the party was founded, EKRE made its first political statement: "No political party in the Riigikogu represents the Estonian people, our national interest or traditional values. The government acts on right- and left liberal, also socialist ideas that our countrymen are simply statistical units or taxpayers, consumers at best. It is not far right or far left, just ultra-liberalism. The Conservative People's Party gives a solution to the voters who are sick of forced choice between Ansip and Savisaar, East and West, left and right." For the first three months, EKRE's support according to the polls was zero, then it began to gradually rise.

Representatives of EKRE have taken part in the yearly gatherings of the veterans of the Estonian Legion at the Sinimäed Hills. In 2013, the attendance of Mart Helme was praised in Estonian media while the abstention of other parties' leaders was frown upon and seen as a result of Russian anti-fascist propaganda.

During the local elections in October 2013, the party gained representation in several smaller municipalities, such as the parishes of Tudulinna and Häädemeeste. A member of the party also became mayor of the town of Saue; however, he was set up independently of EKRE in a local party's list.

The first party since the 1990s to politically organise Estonian diaspora, EKRE founded its Finland branch in October 2014.

In the run-up to the 2015 parliamentary election, EKRE managed to draw supporters from the mainstream right, including defectors mainly from the IRL, but also from the liberal Reform Party and the Free Party's initiative group. In the election, EKRE won 8.1% of the vote and seven seats in the Riigikogu. Soon after, the winning Reform Party excluded EKRE from the coalition talks, citing as a reason a blog post by EKRE's MP Jaak Madison, written in January 2012. In the blog post, Madison, commented on the economic policies in Nazi Germany in the 1930s: "There is no perfect form of government, not even democracy. I consider that (German) fascism was a (negative) ideology that also included several positive nuances that could be needed in order to preserve the nation-state."

The former president of Estonia Arnold Rüütel voiced his support for Mart Helme in the 2016 Estonian presidential election.

As of 2018, EKRE was the only political party in Estonia with growing membership numbers. While all other parties were losing members, EKRE was gaining a few hundred members on a yearly basis.

In March 2019 Mart Helme said to the press that he wishes that one day his party would be the sole ruling party of Estonia.

After gaining 17.8% of the votes in the 2019 parliamentary election, EKRE joined Jüri Ratas' second cabinet with five out of fifteen cabinet positions. In 2021, Jüri Ratas resigned and the new government was formed without EKRE.

In 2021, pundits noticed that since 2019 EKRE support grew in the Russian community (notably in Ida-Viru County) This might be attributed to party's social conservative stance on social policy matters (e. g. opposition to the same-sex marriage).

The leadership of dissolved Estonian Independence Party joined EKRE in October 2022.

In the March 2023 general election, EKRE received 16,05% of the vote and won 17 seats. The party remained in opposition.

A major split in the party took place after the 2024 European Parliament election, with several MPs being expelled from the party, and the party's sole MEP, Jaak Madison leaving the party. Those who departed EKRE accused the EKRE leadership of pro-Russian stances and called for a less aggressive communication style towards political opponents. Several of the politicians who left EKRE subsequently formed the 'Estonian Nationalists and Conservatives' party.

== Ideology and political positions ==
EKRE describes itself as "a principled and bravely patriotic Estonian party with an unshakable mission to protect Estonian national values and interests".

The Estonian Conservative People's Party program states that it is founded on the continuity of the Republic of Estonia and its Constitution, and it unites people who fight for the nation state, social cohesion and democratic principles.

EKRE states that the activities of the party are based on three fundamental values:

- Endurance of the Estonian values, based on support for the language, culture, education, family, traditions and national economy
- Participation society of equal opportunities, where open, honest and democratic governance allows all citizens to reach fulfilment and get involved in politics
- Socially and regionally balanced development and well-being that are guaranteed by a fair and strong state by implementing caring and knowledge-based policies and by developing an ecologically sustainable living environment.

It has also been labelled "far-right" by Kari Käsper, the executive director of Estonian Human Rights Centre, and in foreign media by BBC News and The Christian Science Monitor. According to Fox News, EKRE is a far-right party, "considered by some to have Fascist-Neo-Nazi sympathies similar to many other flourishing nationalist parties in the Baltics and Eastern Europe". The Simon Wiesenthal Center has called EKRE youth organisation's annual torchlight procession an "extreme right march".

Martin Helme, the party leader, has said that the accusations of extremism simply reflect the unfamiliarity and discomfort of the ruling class and media with the new political rhetoric of EKRE: "The mainstream has become so orthodox, so narrow, that whatever is not immaculately, diligently, fervently more-catholic-than-pope mainstream is immediately labelled extremism."

The programme of EKRE states that the citizens must actively guard against the external as well as the internal enemy in order to secure the Estonian nation, the survival of its independence and its status as an ethno-state. It also states as its objectives the creation of the environment needed for the survival of the Estonian language and culture. The party calls for implementation of direct democracy, balanced state budget, and strict control over immigration to Estonia. Mart Helme has also expressed wishes for EKRE to gain the parliamentary majority and become the sole governing party (in contrast with Estonia's usual coalition governments).

=== Social policies ===
==== Education and health care ====
The EKRE strongly opposes the widespread closure of schools in the countryside. Its program requires the teachers to speak high-level Estonian and be loyal to the Estonian state. To raise the quality of education, EKRE desires to raise the wages of teachers.

According to the program of the party, the importance of health care is linked to the preservation of the Estonian nation. The party stands for free dental treatment, wants to limit the availability of tobacco, alcohol and narcotics, and opposes abortion.

==== Demography and immigration ====
According to EKRE, demography is one of the most crucial aspects in the survival of the Estonian state. According to Mart Helme, Estonia is in a "demographic crisis", characterised by low birth rate and emigration of more than 100,000 Estonians in recent years. To counter the falling birth rate, the party has proposed family welfare programs such as paying back a quarter of a married couple's mortgage loan with every child's birth and lowering a parent's income tax by 5% rate for every child being raised in the family.

EKRE has actively stood against immigration from the Middle East and Africa, especially regarding the quota system proposed by EU Commission in 2015 to resettle the immigrants to all EU member states. Citing a large number of Russians already imported during the Soviet occupation, the party has repeatedly ruled out supporting any further mass immigration into Estonia. The party upholds that the Estonian migration policies must advance the aim of "expanding the amount and percentage of Estonians in Estonia" and if the liberal government allows immigration to "alter the ethnic makeup of Estonia", it is "scandalous and undemocratic".

Commenting on riots in socially segregated suburbs in Sweden, Martin Helme, then board member and the party leader's son said in a TV talk show in May 2013: "Estonia shouldn't allow things to go as far as in England, France and Sweden. Our immigration policy should have one simple rule: if you're black, go back. As simple as that. We shouldn't allow this problem to emerge in the first place."

According to the political scientist Tõnis Saarts, the will to show the Russian minority "their proper place" by making the language and citizenship laws more strict seems to be the "ancient urge of this party".

In response to the arrest of Estonian Defence Forces Major Deniss Metsavas, who has ethnic Russian background, for giving classified information to the GRU, Blue Awakening has proposed ethnic profiling when giving non-ethnic Estonian officers access to government secrets. EKRE representative Ruuben Kaalep reasoned: "The only logical explanation for his actions is that blood is thicker than water. Loyalty is not guaranteed by Estonian citizenship or even a soldier's oath given to the Estonian state. Loyalty is based on a feeling of ethnic belonging and a bond with one's ancestors."

Prior to the 2019 Estonian parliamentary election, Mart Helme said that there was an "overlap" between the party's "very conservative" attitudes towards immigration and "homosexual propaganda" and those of Russians in Estonia. Mart Helme has criticised Ukrainian immigration to Estonia, on the basis that both Estonian and Russian residents would "lose their jobs" to lower-wage Ukrainian migrants.

==== Same-sex unions ====
The party strictly opposed the civil partnership law on registered partnership for same-sex couples that was adopted by Riigikogu in October 2014. Arguing the law grants adoption rights to homosexual couples, the party believes it essentially establishes same-sex marriage. Instead, the party proposes laws that would help to raise the birth rate and strengthen the societal attitudes towards having children, including the need to strengthen the traditional family model.

EKRE also says that pushing through the law while opinion polls showed that the majority of Estonian people opposed it was undemocratic. The party platform proposes a referendum on the civil partnership law.

The party's chairman Mart Helme has characterised the Baltic Pride as "some kind of a parade of perverts".

The safeguarding of a parade of perverts is not the job of the police.

— Mart Helme, chairman of EKRE, talking about the LGBT Pride march in Tallinn, in Uued Uudised, 2017

Homosexual- and multicultural propaganda has to be taken out of schools. Children need to get the best education, an Estonian-minded upbringing and healthy values from school. We support giving children a patriotic education. We do not allow so-called tolerance propaganda in schools. Education should not be played with!

— One of the "10 commandments" of EKRE

=== Direct democracy ===
EKRE views Estonia's form of government as heavily biased towards representative democracy, without means for the people to have an influence on politics other than elections. To change that, the party wants to return to more traditional ways of direct democracy, such as provided by the earlier Estonian constitutions of 1920 and 1934.

The party program includes support of the right of citizens to create initiatives if at least 25,000 registered voters sign a petition to put a bill on referendum. EKRE supports public presidential elections, recall elections and public elections of judges, prosecutors and local police prefects. The party wants to abolish D'Hondt method from the parliamentary elections.

=== Economic policies ===
The party program states that the development of the market must serve the national interest. The party calls for creation of a national public bank. It has also supported cooperative banking in Tartu, including in its program the establishment of an alternative interest-free currency.

EKRE has voiced criticism over the execution of the Rail Baltica project. According to the party, Rail Baltica could potentially bring great benefit to the economy of Estonia, but the current project has a questionable impact on the environment and local communities, as well as a doubtful economic viability. In 2016, both Mart Helme and Henn Põlluaas proposed that the current project should be replaced with a vactrain or Hyperloop connecting Estonia to Central Europe. The party has supported limiting the sale of land to foreigners.

=== Environment ===
According to EKRE, the "untouched natural beauty" of Estonia must be preserved more effectively. Therefore, the party supports alternative and environment-friendly sources of energy. EKRE wants to intensify the fight against littering and says the offenders must be punished at least with a sum necessary to compensate for the harm created to nature. The party's program includes a ban on all genetically modified foods and their import. EKRE has been described as being skeptical of climate change.

=== Foreign and defence policies ===
The Conservative People's Party of Estonia often calls to protect Estonia's independence and sovereignty from supranational unions. They say that the European Union is moving towards a federal state and Estonia should veto any legislation that centralises more power to the hands of EU. On 30 August 2012, EKRE organised a protest at Toompea against the ratification of European Stability Mechanism treaty.

While the party does not advocate Estonia's exit from the EU, it believes that the union has to undergo a drastic change. According to EKRE, the EU has to become a military alliance that would defend all European ethnicities based on the concept of ethnopluralism. EKRE wants to strongly limit the amount of bureaucracy in the EU.

EKRE strongly opposes a proposed border treaty between Estonia and Russia, which, according to the party, would cede 5.2% of Estonia's territory to the latter permanently and without compromise or compensation to Estonia. The party has called the possible signing of the treaty "treason" and the Estonian politicians who would sign it "traitors to the state". However, EKRE more recently has expressed support for the eventual normalisation of relations with Russia, urging a similar policy towards Russia as that of Finland, and to "not parlay up every minor incident into a drama". Although Mart Helme supports existing sanctions imposed against Russia, he has criticised American and EU sanctions policies towards Russia, warning that tougher sanctions would not "make Russia become a democracy", and believes "diplomatic negotiations" are the only way to resolve Estonia's disputes with Russia. He has also rejected suggestions that Russian President Vladimir Putin is an enemy of Estonia, describing Putin as a "pragmatist" who is "pretty neutral" towards Estonia. These mildly pro-Russian positions were abruptly reversed after the 2022 Russian invasion of Ukraine: after the invasion started, the EKRE proposed a ban on the ownership of weapons by Russians in Estonia and supported the proposal of stopping gas importations from Russia to Estonia. However, Martin Helme later expressed criticism of Estonian aid to Ukraine, citing the need to prioritize infrastructure investment, and suggested that Estonia "concentrate on striving for peace". He later advocated for Ukraine ceding territory to Russia in order to achieve a peace deal, supporting U.S. President Donald Trump's peace efforts.

The party opposes the accession of Turkey to the European Union and has called for reconsidering Turkey's membership in NATO. After the 2016 Turkish coup d'état attempt, EKRE expressed regret over its defeat and called Turkey "no more democratic country than Russia".

The EKRE proposes a national defence policy based on self-reliance of Estonia. The security of the country would be safeguarded by the existence of initial defence, compulsory military service, total defence, international cooperation and the membership of NATO. The platform of the party includes formation of two tank battalions and acquisition of medium-range anti-aircraft systems.

Martin Helme has expressed sympathy for American presidential candidate Donald Trump, including his argument the Baltic countries need to make a financial contribution in exchange for the military alliance with the United States. "He can see no reason why the United States should make the national defense of other countries its duty. And I believe this question is completely justified. It's namely our party that has been saying for a long time that making initial independent defense capability strong is the most important thing, allies being the next component," said Helme.

One of the party's members, Georg Kirsberg, running for election in 2017, supported "a correct teaching of the history of the Third Reich." However, party leader Martin Helme stated that was not the policy of the party, and only "the thought of one person."

The party is supportive of Israel and was the first party to support Estonian recognition of Jerusalem as its capital. During the 2022 Russian invasion of Ukraine, Martin Helme proposed a weapon deal between Estonia and Israel to defend the country from Russia.

Helme has expressed support for the Georgian government's stances on national sovereignty and LGBT issues, opposing a parliamentary statement in support of the Georgian opposition that condemned the ruling Georgian Dream party.

== Blue Awakening movement ==
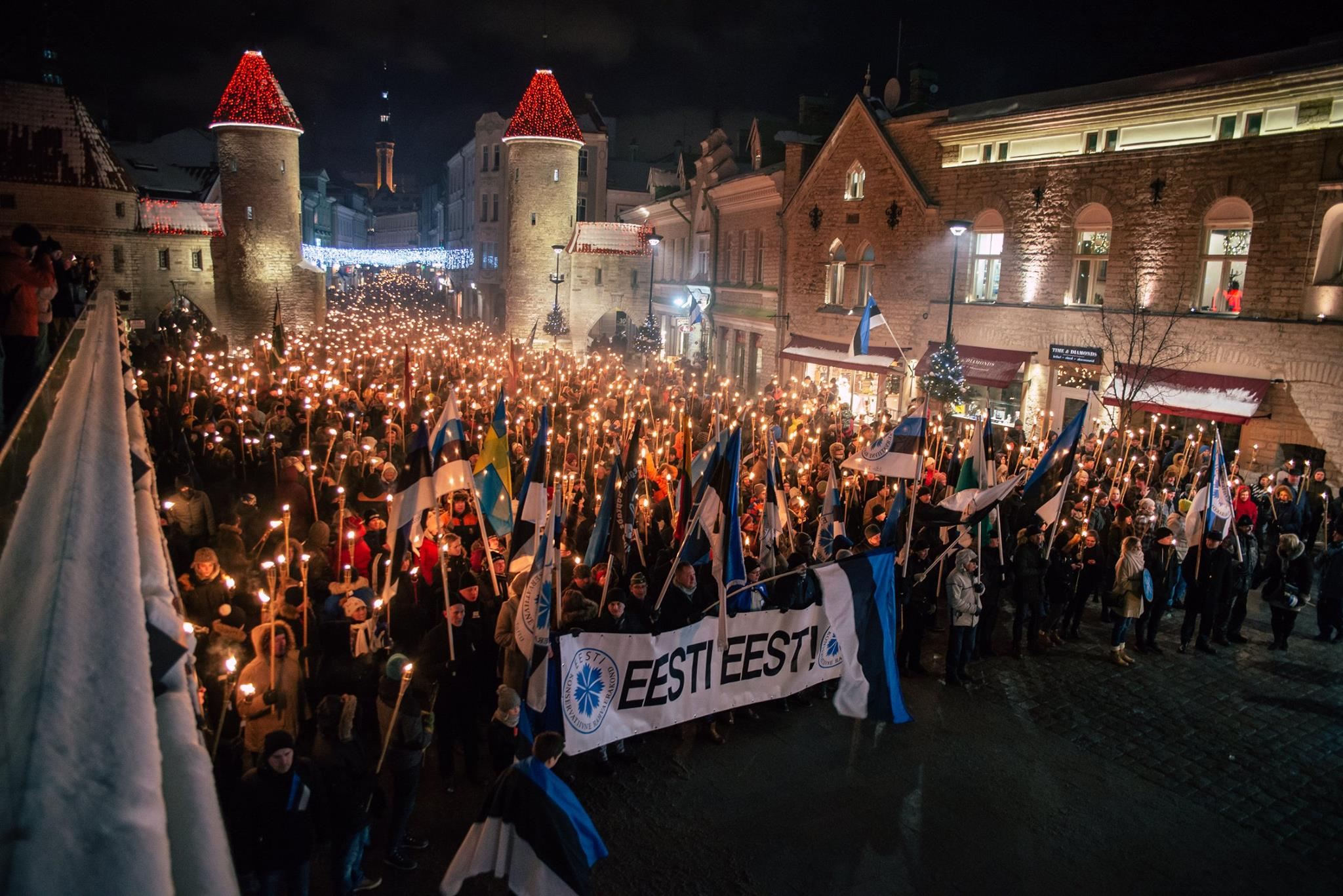
A political demonstration in Tallinn on 24 February 2018 featured torchlights. The annual event has been organised by EKRE and the Blue Awakening to mark the Independence Day of Estonia.

The party's affiliated nationalist youth movement, Blue Awakening, with links to the pan-European Identitarian movement and the alt-right in North America, states "a new national awakening of the Estonians" as its principal aim. This would come as a continuation to the 19th century Estonian national awakening and the Singing Revolution, leading the way to the establishment of "an eternal Estonian ethno-state".

Blue Awakening was founded on 30 November 2012 by Ruuben Kaalep and other youth from the Estonian Patriotic Movement. The young activists have been behind many of the party's protest marches. In addition to politics, the youth of Blue Awakening focus on art, music and right-wing philosophy such as the Traditionalist School of Julius Evola and René Guénon. The movement is disciplined and its activists have formed several squads. In 2019, it was reported that Kaalep had organised firearms training with pistols and assault rifles to youths from the Blue Awakening. Their activities have included rituals shaped after shamanism, and celebrations of sunrise on ancient tumuli.

Blue Awakening was the main organiser of the annual torchlight procession through Tallinn on 24 February to commemorate the 1918 Independence Day of Estonia. The first such Independence Day demonstration was held in 2014. According to Blue Awakening, "the event is meant to honor those who have fallen for the nation of Estonia and to signify that Estonian youth have not abandoned the patriotic principles." The event has been condemned by the Simon Wiesenthal Center who described it as "Nuremberg-esque" and likened the ideology of the participants to that of the Estonian collaborators with the Nazi German regime during World War II.

On 6 July 2024, Blue Awakening left EKRE with a plan to join the newly formed Estonian Nationalists and Conservatives.

== International relations ==
EKRE has close links with similar right-wing nationalist parties in Latvia and Lithuania. On 23 August 2013, EKRE signed the Declaration of Bauska together with political parties National Alliance and Lithuanian Nationalist Union. The declaration calls for a new national awakening of the Baltic countries and warns about threats posed by international globalism, multiculturalism and Russian imperialist ambitions.

In 2014, the party's congress in Tallinn was visited by a delegation from the UK Independence Party. The delegation was led by Roger Helmer who gave a speech in support of Euroscepticism in Estonia.

Organisations with whom EKRE cooperates take regularly part of the annual torchlight march in Tallinn. They include all signatories of the Declaration of Bauska and the Scandinavian nationalist youth movement Nordisk Ungdom.

The party also has contacts among Ukrainian nationalists. During Euromaidan, Mart Helme sent an address to the protestors in Kyiv, urging the Ukrainian patriots not to succumb to Russian demands.

In February 2019, EKRE joined the Identity and Democracy Party, which was rebranded as Patriots.eu in 2024.

In July 2019, Mart Helme met with Hungarian Prime Minister and Fidesz leader Viktor Orbán, and stressed that "Fidesz and EKRE are political parties based on Christian traditions and a desire to create a political Christian alliance-based alignment, in order to resist the liberal worldview throughout Europe".

In December 2021, the party participated in the Warsaw summit with Fidesz, Law and Justice, the Finns Party, the Christian Democratic National Peasants' Party, Electoral Action of Poles in Lithuania – Christian Families Alliance, Vox, National Rally, JA21 and Vlaams Belang. The party also has links with the National Party of Ireland.

In May 2025, Martin Helme met with Georgian Prime Minister and Georgian Dream party chairman Irakli Kobakhidze, describing him as a "Georgian patriot" and pledging to send an EKRE delegation to visit Georgia after the 2025 Estonian municipal elections.

== Support base ==
EKRE's support base has also attracted scholarly interest. Jokubas Salyga argues that it should be understood as comprising various disenfranchised working-class and middle-class segments. Among the former one finds agricultural laborers, larger households who struggle financially, elderly individuals living in poverty, and disillusioned young people.

In 2019, EKRE also attracted support from the middle-class segments in Estonia. Martin Helme described the electoral cartography of the 2019 polls by noting that while wealthier municipalities voted for the neoliberal Reform Party, and the poorer for the left-leaning Centre Party, those of Pro Patria and EKRE were distinctly middle-class. The districts in which the party came a close second (Laane-Viru, Jarva and Viljandi) are typified by the highest average standard output per agricultural holding. They also qualify as those hardest hit by the economic recession, which is indicative of the far-right's ability to marshal support from relatively better-off electorate, disillusioned with their previous choice of the Reform Party.

Additionally, some owners of small and large businesses who are unhappy with policies that benefit multinational corporations and the wealthy ruling class also support the far-right party. This support is particularly strong in the rural areas of the country. Interestingly, even some locally owned companies based in Tallinn, such as the software consultancy multinational Helmes, showed support for the far-right party's economic agenda.

== Election results ==
=== Parliamentary elections ===
Election	Leader	Votes	%	Seats	+/−	Status
2015	Mart Helme	46,772	8.15 (#6)	7 / 101	New	Opposition
2019	Mart Helme	99,671	17.76 (#3)	19 / 101	▲12	Coalition (2019–2021)
2019	Mart Helme	99,671	17.76 (#3)	19 / 101	▲12	Opposition (2021–2023)
2023	Martin Helme	97,966	16.05 (#2)	17 / 101	▼2	Opposition

=== European Parliament elections ===
Election	List leader	Votes	%	Seats	+/−	EP Group
2014	Martin Helme	13,247	4.03 (#6)	0 / 6	New	–
2019	Mart Helme	42,265	12.73 (#4)	1 / 7	▲1	ID
2024	Martin Helme	54,712	14.86 (#4)	1 / 7	Steady	– (Note: The party's only elected MEP, Jaak Madison, left the party less than a month after the election, leaving the party without representation at the European Parliament.)

=== Municipal elections ===
Election	Votes	%
2013	8,337	1.3% (#5)
2017	39,003	6.7% (#5)
2021	77,236	13.2% (#3)
2025	48,478	8.20% (#6)

== See also ==
- List of political parties in Estonia
