= Marti Kuusik =

Estonian politician (born 1970)

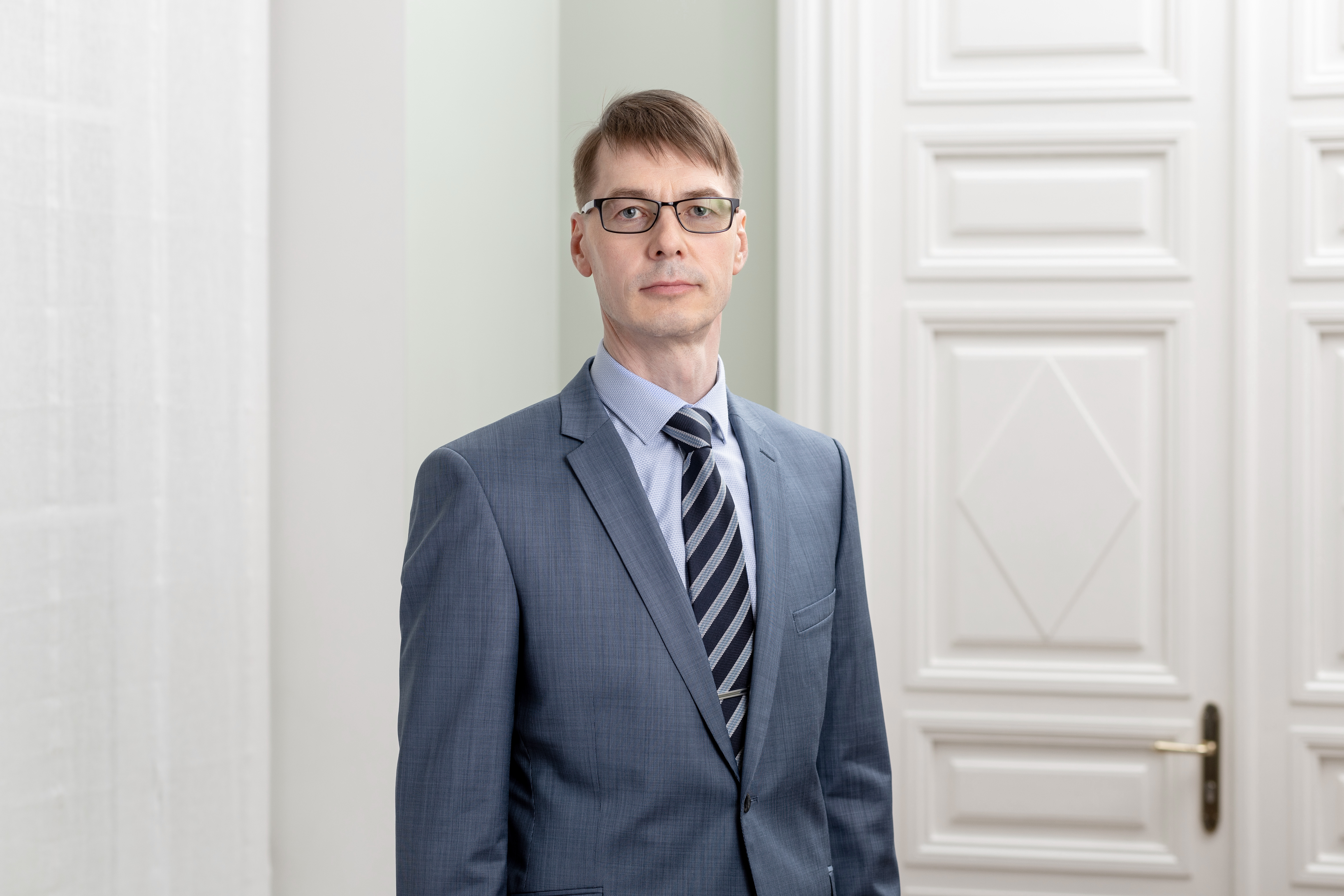

Marti Kuusik (born 4 July 1970) is an Estonian politician.

In April 2019, he was Minister of Foreign Trade and Information Technology. The post lasted only one day because there were alleged complaints related to domestic violence.

He has been a member of Estonian Conservative People's Party.
