= Jaak Aab =

Estonian politician (born 1960)

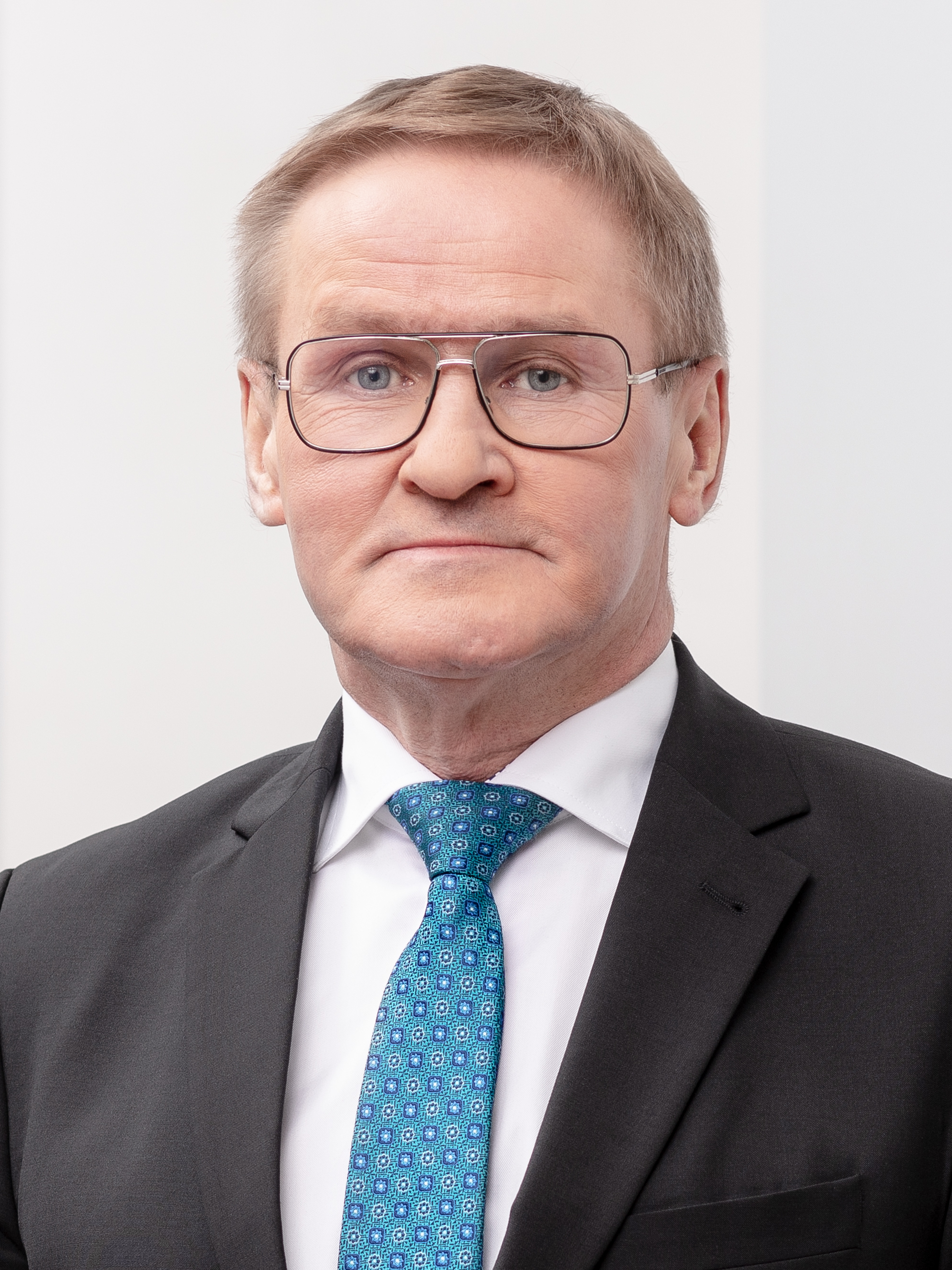
- Jaak Aab in 2021

Minister of Public Administration
- In office 26 January 2021 – 3 June 2022
- Prime Minister: Kaja Kallas
- Preceded by: Anneli Ott
- Succeeded by: Riina Solman
- In office 29 April 2019 – 25 November 2020
- Prime Minister: Jüri Ratas
- Preceded by: Janek Mäggi
- Succeeded by: Anneli Ott
- In office 12 June 2017 – 2 May 2018
- Prime Minister: Jüri Ratas
- Preceded by: Mihhail Korb
- Succeeded by: Janek Mäggi

Minister of Education and Research
- In office 25 November 2020 – 26 January 2021
- Prime Minister: Jüri Ratas
- Preceded by: Mailis Reps
- Succeeded by: Liina Kersna

Minister of Social Affairs
- In office 13 April 2005 – 5 April 2007
- Prime Minister: Andrus Ansip
- Preceded by: Marko Pomerants
- Succeeded by: Maret Maripuu

Personal details
- Born: 9 April 1960 (age 66) Taagepera, then part of Estonian SSR, Soviet Union
- Party: Estonian Centre Party (1994–2024); Social Democratic Party (2024–present)
- Education: Tallinn University

Jaak Aab (Estonian: [ˈjɑːkˑ ˈɑːp]; born 9 April 1960) is an Estonian politician who has served as Minister of Education and Research and three times as the Minister of Public Administration from 2017 to 2018, from 2019 to 2020 and from 2011 to 2022 and as the Minister of Social Affairs from 2005 to 2007. From 1994 until 5 January 2024, he was a member of the Estonian Centre Party before joining the Social Democratic Party. He is the former mayor of Võhma and has served in the IX, XI, XIV and XV Riigikogu.

== Life ==
Jaak Aab attended school in Ala (Helme Parish in Valga County) and in Viljandi. After graduating from high school in 1978, he studied to become a teacher in Russian language and literature from 1978 to 1986 at the Pedagogical Institute in Tallinn (Tallinna Pedagoogiline Instituut, today known as the Tallinn University). From 1984 to 1991, he was active as a teacher in Ala and Võhma. From 1991 to 1994, Aab worked in Finland.

Upon returning to Estonia, Aab started working in politics. From November 1994 to January 1996, he served as a senior mayor of the city of Võhma. From August 1998 to February 2002, Aab held the office of senior mayor. From February 2002 to March 2003, Aab was a member of the Estonian Parliament (Riigikogu). From July 2003 to April 2005, he was the executive director of the Association of Estonian Cities and Municipalities (Eesti Linnade ja Valdade Liit), before Prime Minister Andrus Ansip appointed him to his cabinet in 2005. From 13 April 2005 to 5 April 2007, Jaak Aab was the Minister of Social Affairs of the Republic of Estonia.

Since April 2007, Aab has been a representative of the Estonian Parliament and acting chairman of the Social Committee.

== Personal life ==
Jaak Aab was married to teacher Kaie Aab (born 1958). The couple had two daughters. Since 2020 is married to Marian Aab (née Kullerkupp).

Political offices
Preceded by Marko Pomerants	Minister of Social Affairs; 2005–2007	Succeeded by Maret Maripuu
Preceded by Mihhail Korb	Minister of Public Administration; 2017–2018	Succeeded by Janek Mäggi
Preceded by Janek Mäggi	Minister of Public Administration; 2019–2020	Succeeded by Anneli Ott
Preceded by Mailis Reps	Minister of Education and Research; 2020–2021	Succeeded by Liina Kersna
Preceded by Anneli Ott	Minister of Public Administration; 2021–2022	Succeeded by Riina Solman
