= Ministry of Finance (Estonia) =

Government ministry of Estonia

- Eesti Vabariigi Rahandusministeerium

Ministry overview
- Formed: 24 February 1918
- Jurisdiction: Government of Estonia
- Headquarters: Suur-Ameerika 1, 10122 Tallinn, Estonia
- Annual budget: €382 million (2023)
- Minister responsible: Mart Võrklaev, Minister of Finance
- Child agencies: Statistics Estonia; Tax and Customs Board; Information Technology Centre for the Ministry of Finance; State Shared Service Center
- Key document: https://www.riigiteataja.ee/akt/129122011136?leiaKehtiv
- Website: http://www.fin.ee/

The Ministry of Finance is the Estonian government department responsible for the implementation of tax, financial and fiscal policies, and setting economic goals.

== See also ==
- Minister of Finance
- Minister of Public Administration
