= Jüri Ratas =

18th Prime Minister of Estonia (born 1978)

Jüri Ratas MEP
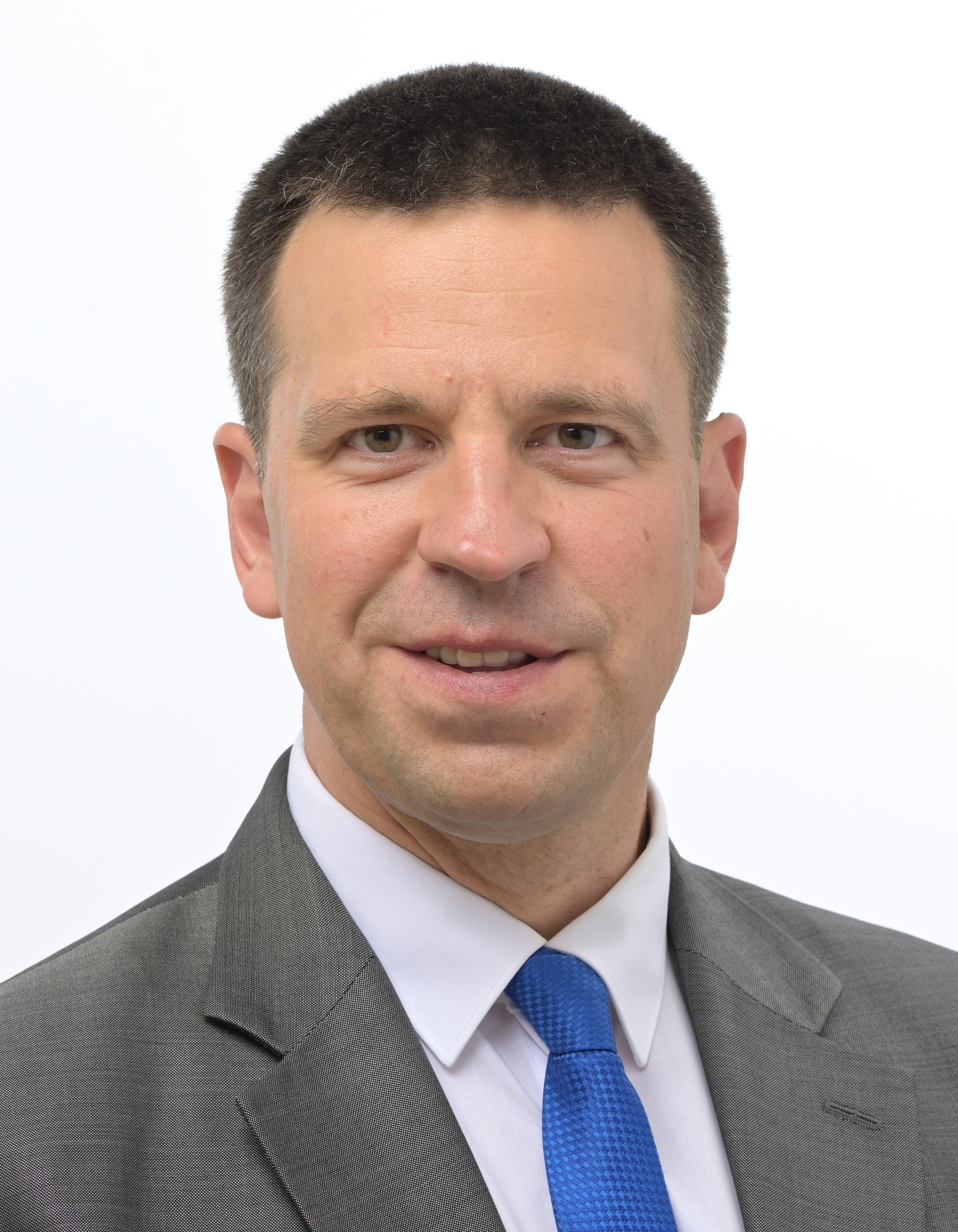
- Official portrait, 2024

Prime Minister of Estonia
- In office 23 November 2016 – 26 January 2021
- President: Kersti Kaljulaid
- Preceded by: Taavi Rõivas
- Succeeded by: Kaja Kallas

President of the Riigikogu
- In office 18 March 2021 – 10 April 2023
- Preceded by: Henn Põlluaas
- Succeeded by: Lauri Hussar

Leader of the Centre Party
- In office 5 November 2016 – 10 September 2023
- Preceded by: Edgar Savisaar
- Succeeded by: Mihhail Kõlvart

Mayor of Tallinn
- In office 15 November 2005 – 5 April 2007
- Preceded by: Tõnis Palts
- Succeeded by: Edgar Savisaar

Member of the Riigikogu
- In office 2 April 2007 – 15 July 2024
- Constituency: Tallinn

Member of the European Parliament for Estonia
- Incumbent
- Assumed office 16 July 2024

Personal details
- Born: 2 July 1978 (age 48) Tallinn, then part of Estonian SSR, Soviet Union
- Party: Centre (2000–2024); Isamaa (since 2024)
- Spouse: Karin Ratas
- Children: 4
- Parent: Rein Ratas (father)
- Education: Tallinn University of Technology

Jüri Ratas (Estonian pronunciation: [ˈjyri ˈrɑtːɑs]; born 2 July 1978) is an Estonian politician who served as the prime minister of Estonia from 2016 to 2021 and as the leader of the Centre Party from 2016 to 2023, and the mayor of Tallinn from 2005 to 2007. Ratas was a member of the Centre Party until switching to Isamaa in 2024.

As the prime minister Ratas led two cabinets. His first cabinet was in office from 2016 to 2019 and the second from 2019 to 2021. His second cabinet was notable for its share of public scandals, the highest number of resignations of ministers in Estonian history and the number of public apologies from Ratas, mostly connected to the activities and offensive public statements of the smaller coalition partner nationalist and right-wing populist EKRE party. Among others they called Sanna Marin a "non-educated sales girl" and Joe Biden a "corrupt character" forcing Ratas to apologize on their behalf.

His tenure also saw the national budget of Estonia going into deficit after years of being in surplus.

== Career ==
He acted as the vice-president of the Riigikogu from 2007 to 2016 and Mayor of Tallinn from 2005 to 2007, attaining the post at the age of 27. As a mayor of Tallinn he initiated the European Green Capital Award programme.

In the 2015 Estonian parliamentary election, Ratas was re-elected to the parliament with 7,932 individual votes. In March he was elected as the second deputy speaker of the Riigikogu.

On 5 November 2016, Ratas was elected to succeed Edgar Savisaar as the leader of the Centre Party. After Taavi Rõivas' second cabinet split in November 2016 due to internal struggle, coalition talks began between Centre Party, Social Democratic Party, and Pro Patria and Res Publica Union.

== Premiership ==
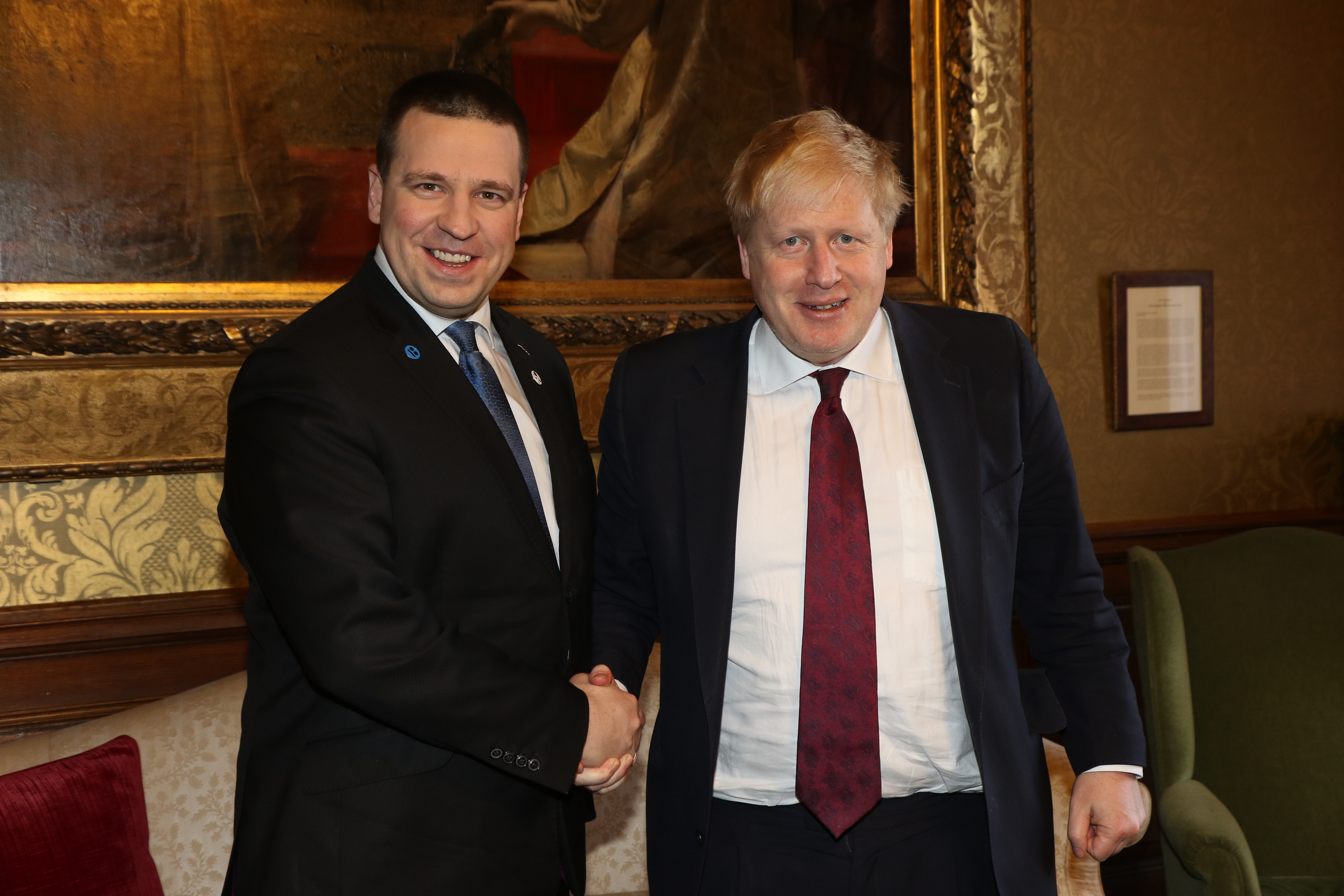
Ratas with Boris Johnson

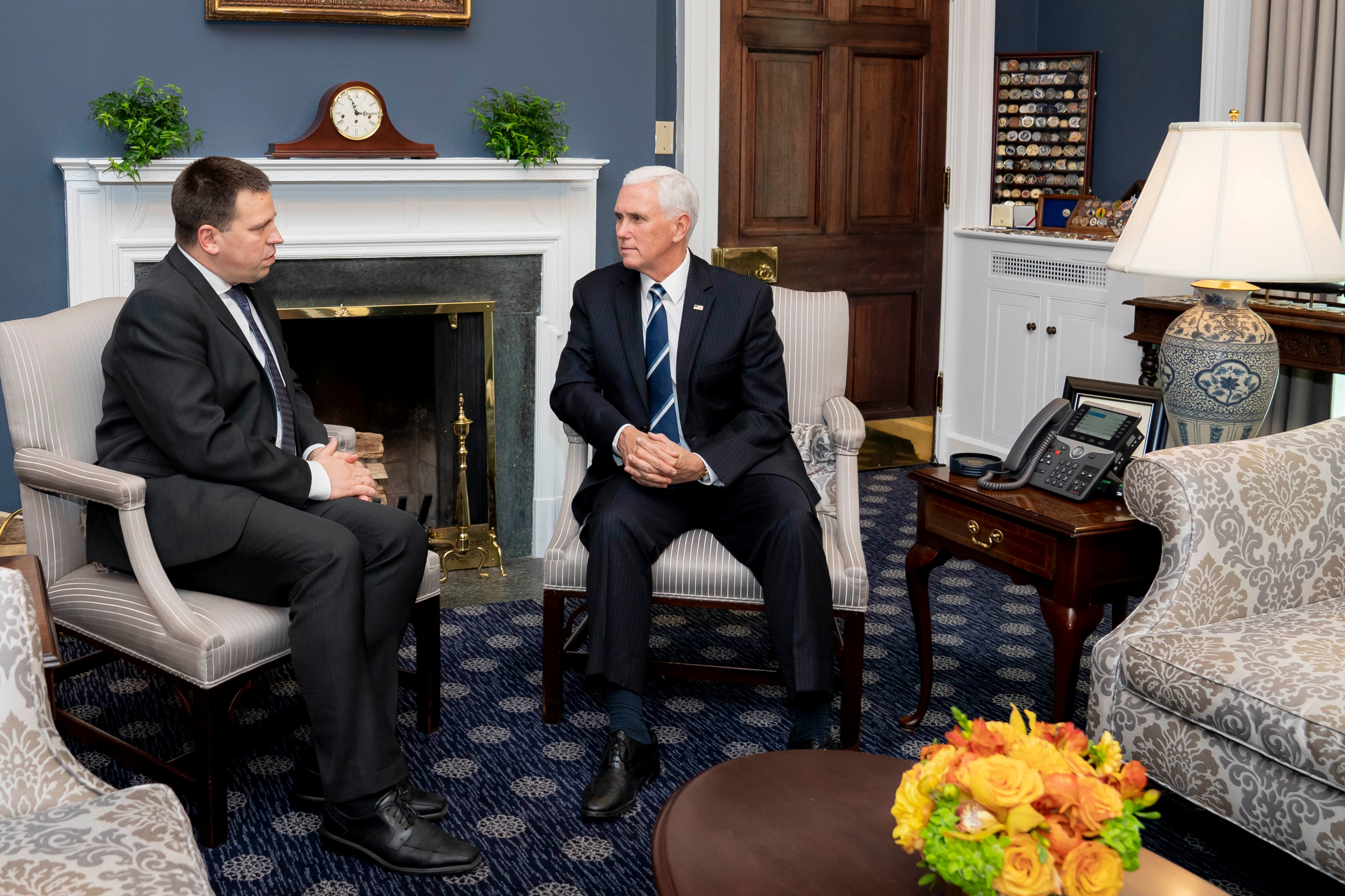
Ratas with U.S. Vice President Mike Pence on 31 October 2019

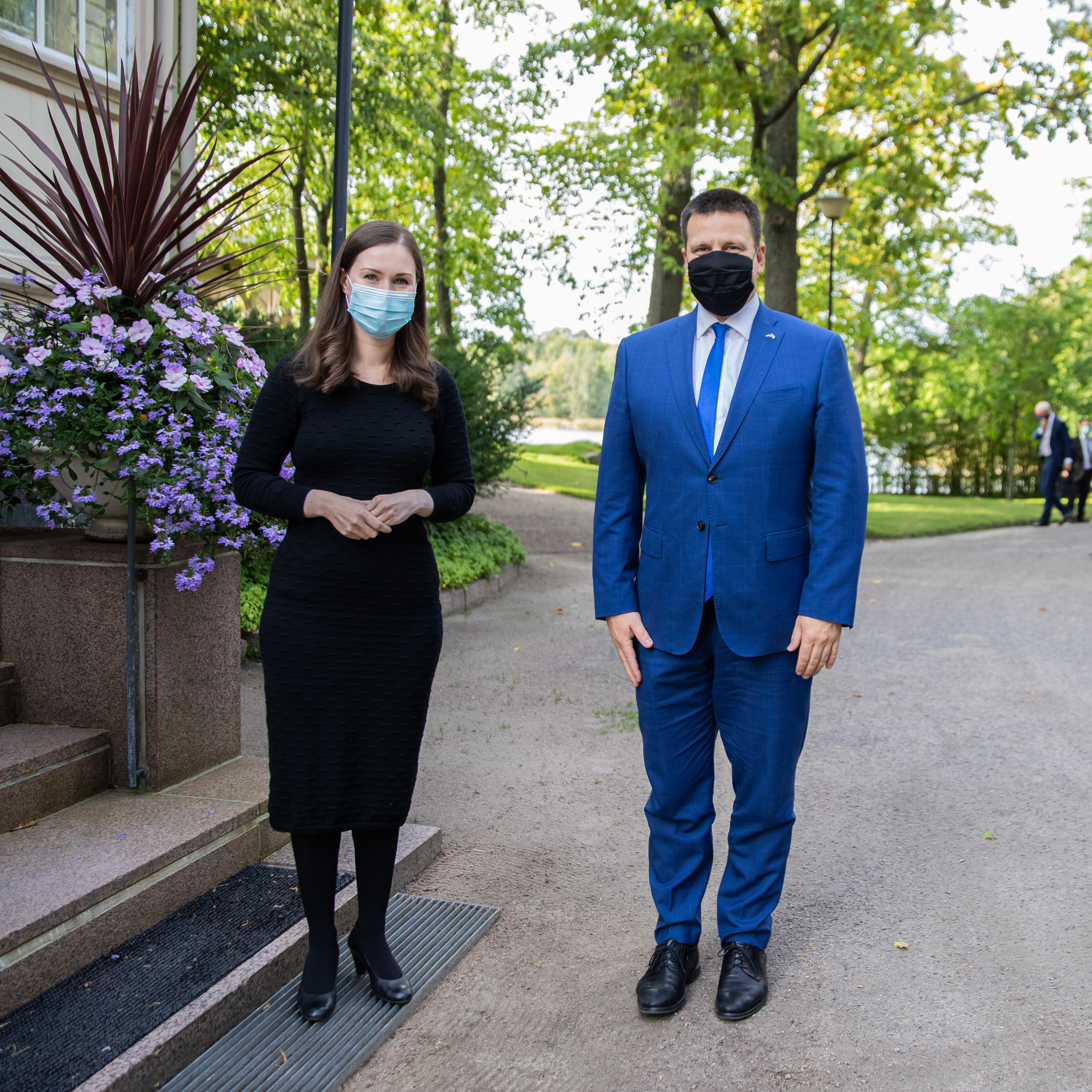
Ratas with Finnish Prime Minister Sanna Marin on 22 September 2020

On 19 November, the three parties agreed on the conditions of Ratas' first cabinet. Ratas was sworn in as the prime minister of Estonia on 23 November.

After 2019 parliamentary election, Ratas turned down a coalition offer from the liberal Reform Party which had won the election and instead entered into talks with the conservative Isamaa and the often-considered as far-right, EKRE. On 17 April, Riigikogu granted Ratas the authority to form the government and remain Prime Minister. These talks resulted in the formation of Ratas' second cabinet in April 2019.

During his tenure, the national budget of Estonia went into deficit after years of being in surplus. This drew widespread criticism, notably from the European Commission and the Estonian Central Bank.

On 9 March 2018, after Poland's referral to the European Court of Justice, leaders of Latvia, Lithuania and Estonia expressed their support for Poland over the Article 7 of the Treaty on European Union. Ratas said that "Any problems related to voting and taking away the right to vote – I do not think that it should happen at all, it would be a step too far."

=== Coalition formation in 2019 ===
In the elections of 2019, the party of Ratas, the Estonian Centre Party, lost support while the opposition liberal Estonian Reform Party, gained support and became the largest party by seat count. After the elections, Ratas turned down an offer by the Reform party for coalition talks and entered into talks with Isamaa and EKRE, the latter being widely considered a far-right party. Ratas had previously ruled out forming a coalition with EKRE during the election campaign because of its hostile views.

When I said before that it would be impossible for me to cooperate with a political party which cuts heads off, doesn't agree to certain nationalities or races, then EKRE has indeed said those things.

— Ratas talking about EKRE in November 2018, widely interpreted as ruling out a coalition with EKRE.

The subsequent reversal of his stance and the inclusion of EKRE by Ratas in coalition talks after the elections was met with local and international criticism. In a poll conducted after the start of the coalition talks, the party of Jüri Ratas further lost support.

The critics of the decision have claimed that Ratas is willing to sacrifice his party's values, the confidence of his voters and the stability and reputation of the country to keep his position as prime minister. Ratas countered that his first duty is to look for ways to get his party included in the government to be able to work in the benefit of his voters and that the coalition would continue to firmly support the EU, NATO and would be sending out messages of tolerance.

Some key members and popular candidates of the party of Ratas have been critical of the decision, with Raimond Kaljulaid leaving the party in protest. Yana Toom, a member of the party and its representative in the European Parliament expressed criticism of the decision. Mihhail Kõlvart, popular among the Russian-speaking voters and the newly-elect mayor of Tallinn, has said the Centre party cannot govern with EKRE's approach.

The decision was also criticised by Guy Verhofstadt, leader of the ALDE group in the European Parliament, of which the Centre Party of Ratas is a member, suggesting that Ratas should break off coalition talks with the national-conservative EKRE. Ratas responded in the Estonian media that "Brussels should not dictate to us what our coalition should be like."

When on the third week of coalition talks, Martin Helme of EKRE accused gynaecologists of violating their Hippocratic Oath by performing abortions, Ratas demanded the party to stop accusing doctors – with this being the first public criticism of EKRE by Ratas after the start of the coalition talks.

On 17 April, the Riigikogu voted in favour of granting Ratas the authority to form the government.

Ratas resigned as prime minister on 13 January 2021 after the Prosecutor General suspected the Centre Party of "criminal involvement" in an influence peddling scandal involving businessman Hillar Teder. Ratas stated that he had no knowledge of the alleged affair and had committed no wrongdoing, but chose to resign to take political responsibility for the scandal. He remained as the head of a caretaker government until a new coalition was formed. On 25 January 2021 Kaja Kallas formed an Estonian Reform Party-led coalition government with the Estonian Centre Party. He was succeeded by Lauri Hussar as the president of Riigikogu on 10 April 2023.

=== Changing party ===
On 29 January 2024, Ratas announced he was leaving the Center Party and joining the conservative-christian democratic Isamaa due to value differences with his successor as the leader of the party Mihhail Kõlvart.

== Personal life ==
Ratas was born in Tallinn, Estonia. His father was Centre Party politician Rein Ratas. He attended secondary school in Nõmme. He graduated in Business Management from Tallinn University of Technology and obtained a master's degree in Economic Sciences from the same university. He also holds a bachelor's degree in Law from the University of Tartu.

Ratas is married; he has a daughter and three sons.

Ratas regards himself to be a believer and has completed the Alpha course at St. Olaf's Church. Although in the press he has been described as a baptist, he has denied this. Apart from the Estonian language, Ratas is fluent in English and has an understanding of Russian, Swedish and Portuguese. He began learning Russian in early 2017.

His hobbies include chess, reading and horse riding.

== Honours ==
=== National honours ===
- Estonia: Order of the National Coat of Arms, 2nd class (23 February 2021)

=== Foreign honours ===
- Netherlands: Knight Grand Cross of the Order of Orange-Nassau (12 June 2018)
- Italy: Knight Grand Cross of the Order of Merit of the Italian Republic (14 January 2019)
- Latvia: Grand Officer of the Order of the Three Stars (8 April 2019)
- Ukraine: Member 2nd Class of the Order of Prince Yaroslav the Wise (21 October 2022)

Party political offices
| Preceded by Edgar Savisaar | Leader of the Centre Party; 2016–2023 | Succeeded by Mihhail Kõlvart |
Political offices
| Preceded by Tõnis Palts | Mayor of Tallinn; 2005–2007 | Succeeded by Edgar Savisaar |
| Preceded by Taavi Rõivas | Prime Minister of Estonia; 2016–2021 | Succeeded by Kaja Kallas |
| Preceded by Henn Põlluaas | President of the Riigikogu; 2021–2023 | Succeeded by Lauri Hussar |
