= LGBTQ rights in Estonia =

- Location of Estonia (dark green) – in Europe (light green & dark grey) – in the European Union (light green) – [Legend]
- Legal status: Legal (1935–1940; 1992–present); Age of consent equalized in 2002 (see below)
- Gender identity: Right to change legal gender since 1992; no sterilization or surgery required since 1997
- Military: LGBTQ people allowed to serve openly
- Discrimination protections: Sexual orientation protections in employment; implicit gender identity protections in all areas (see below)

Family rights
- Recognition of relationships: Cohabitation agreement since 2016; Same-sex marriage since 2024
- Adoption: Full adoption rights since 2024

Lesbian, gay, bisexual, transgender, and queer (LGBTQ) rights in Estonia have advanced significantly over the course of the last few decades, especially since the turn of the 21st century. Among the countries which after World War II were controlled by the former Soviet Union, independent Estonia is now considered to be the most liberal when it comes to LGBTQ rights. There is a notable age gap, as younger people tend to be more tolerant and liberal, while older people tend to be more socially conservative.

Both male and female forms of same-sex sexual activity are legal in Estonia, with the age of consent having been equalized in 2002. Transgender people have been allowed to change their legal gender since 1992. Discrimination on the basis of sexual orientation is prohibited in employment, discrimination on the basis of gender identity is implicitly prohibited by law in all areas. An LGBT+ Community Support Group was formed in the Riigikogu in May 2023, with openly gay Social Democrat Eduard Odinets as its chairman.

Since 1 January 2016, same-sex couples may register their relationship as a cohabitation agreement, which gives them the same legal protections available to opposite-sex couples. A marriage equality bill was passed on 20 June 2023, which made same-sex couples able to marry and jointly adopt. The law took effect on 1 January 2024. A lesbian couple were the first ones to be officially married the following day. Estonia is the first formerly Soviet-occupied state as well as the only Baltic country to have legalized same-sex marriage.

According to ILGA-Europe's 2025 Rainbow Europe Index, Estonia ranks 21st among 49 countries in Europe on LGBTQ rights legislation. This is lower than the neighbouring countries of Finland or Sweden, but higher than the other two Baltic states, as well as some Western European countries, such as the United Kingdom. A 2023 opinion survey found that 75% of the Estonian population supported an anti-discrimination law covering LGBTQ people, 53% supported same-sex marriage, 71% supported civil partnerships for same-sex couples, and 61% believed that someone who was assigned male at birth could identify as a woman (or vice versa - someone assigned female at birth could identify as a man).

== Laws regarding same-sex sexual activity ==
Estonia was relatively liberal and open during the first period of independence from the 1920s to the 1930s. Same-sex sexual activity between consenting males, which until 1917 had been illegal in the former Russian Empire, was formally legalised in the newly independent Republic of Estonia when the country's parliament approved changes in the criminal code in 1929. It came into force in 1935. Before the adoption of the new criminal law, the criminal and correctional penal code of Imperial Russia was observed.

In 1940, Estonia was occupied and annexed by the Soviet Union, then by Nazi Germany in 1941, and ultimately re-occupied in 1944 by the Soviets. In Soviet-occupied Estonia, same-sex sexual activity between males was a criminal offense under paragraph 118 of the penal code. At least 67 court cases and 155 men convicted under the law are known. After Estonia restored its independence on 20 August 1991, it was made legal again on 1 June 1992. This only removed the punishment for consensual same-sex sexual activity, with the paragraph itself being removed in 2001, with the adoption of a new penal code. This makes Estonia one of the few countries to have legalised same-sex sexual activity twice.

In 2002, the age of consent was set at 14 years and equalized for both homosexual and heterosexual sex. In 2022, the age of consent was raised to 16 years for all persons.

== Recognition of same-sex relationships ==
=== Cohabitation agreements ===
In March 2014, a parliamentary group began to work on a draft bill to regulate the legal status of cohabiting couples. The draft bill was submitted to the Parliament (Riigikogu) on 17 April 2014. On 22 May, the bill was backed by the Government. On 19 June 2014, the Parliament rejected a motion to kill the bill, in a 32–45 vote. The bill's second reading took place on 8 October where a motion to hold a referendum on the issue was defeated in a 35–42 vote and another motion to kill the bill was defeated in a 41–33 vote. The bill's final vote took place on 9 October, where it was passed 40–38. It was signed into law by President Toomas Hendrik Ilves that same day, becoming the Registered Partnership Act, and took effect on 1 January 2016. The campaign against the law was led by the Christian conservative foundation For Family and Tradition (Estonian: SA Perekonna ja Traditsiooni Kaitseks).

However, some implementing acts required for the law to enter into force were not passed at the time. On 26 November 2015, Parliament approved the first implementing acts on a vote of 42–41 with several abstentions. In February 2017, the Tallinn Administrative Court ordered the Estonian Government to pay monetary damages for failing to adopt the implementing acts. In September 2017, President Kersti Kaljulaid criticised the Parliament for failing to accept the implementing acts.

In April 2023, the incoming government pledged to adopt the implementing provisions for the Registered Partnership Act. With the changes to the Family Law Act on 20 June 2023, the implementing provisions for the Act were also fully implemented.

=== Same-sex marriages performed abroad or after sex reassignment ===
A same-sex marriage was recognised by a court in December 2016. The couple, two men who had originally married in Sweden but now live in Estonia, had their marriage officially registered in late January 2017. Initially, a court in Harju County refused to register their marriage, but the couple appealed the decision. In December, the Tallinn Circuit Court ruled that the marriage must be entered into the Estonian population register.

In December 2021, the Ministry of the Interior confirmed that transgender people can change their legal sex while remaining married. Changes made to the Family Law Act in July 2014 permitted them to petition the court to annul such a marriage, but the Ministry had no obligation to do so. If the spouses met the preconditions for entering into a marriage at the time of marriage, then it was not automatically an invalid marriage. By 2021, there were already several couples in Estonia whose marriage had turned into a same-sex marriage as a result of the sex reassignment of one spouse. A spokesman for the Ministry said, "during the last five or six years, significant changes have taken place in society, as a result of which it can no longer be said that the marriage of a same-sex couple is contrary to Estonian public order."

=== Marriage equality ===
On 8 April 2023, the incoming government of the Reform Party, Estonia 200 and the Social Democratic Party, formed following the March 2023 election, published a coalition agreement, including a promise to legalize same-sex marriage by changing the Family Law Act (Estonian: Perekonnaseadus) to define marriage as between two adults.

The government approved a draft same-sex marriage bill in May 2023 and sent it to the Riigikogu on May 15. It was approved at first reading on May 22, with a motion to kill the bill failing 27–53 and the bill moving on to the second reading. It passed the second reading 55–34 on 20 June, before being signed into law by president Alar Karis on 27 June. The bill took effect on 1 January 2024. It allows for same-sex couples to marry and jointly adopt.

Marriage applications could be filed from the moment the bill took effect. A lesbian couple, Leore and Katarina, were the first ones to be officially married on 2 January, the first work day for the Tallinn Vital Statistics Department after the New Year. The couple had originally gotten married in Katarina's native Sweden, but were able to get their marriage recognized due to her also holding Estonian citizenship. Due to the one-month waiting period mandated by the state in order to process marriage applications, other couples must wait until the beginning of February.

In response, the Estonian Evangelical Lutheran Church (Estonian: Eesti Evangeelne Luterlik Kirik) at first made a preliminary decision to stop registering any marriages, on a temporary basis. This decision was announced by archbishop Urmas Viilma, head of the EELK, in July 2023. Minister of Social Protection Signe Riisalo said that the EELK and other churches were free to make their own decision. The church may forgo the right to register marriages once and for all, according to Viilma. In 2022, only six percent of marriages were registered by clergy, with the vast majority being registered by a local government official. On 17 October 2023, the church council voted to have clergy keep registering opposite-sex marriages after the bill takes effect, but not same-sex ones.

== Adoption and family law ==
Single gay, lesbian and bisexual people may petition to adopt. Same-sex couples are allowed to foster. Same-sex couples can adopt jointly since 2024.

Due to the Registered Partnership Act, couples are allowed to adopt stepchildren since 2016. In February 2017, the Tallinn Administrative Court allowed a lesbian woman to adopt her partner's children. There have been other cases of same-sex couples successfully adopting. Additionally, lesbian couples have access to IVF.

== Discrimination protections ==
=== Sexual orientation and gender identity ===
As an obligation for acceptance into the European Union, Estonia transposed an EU directive into its own laws banning discrimination based on sexual orientation in employment from 1 May 2004. The Equal Treatment Act (Estonian: Võrdse kohtlemise seadus), which entered into force on 1 January 2009, also prohibits discrimination on the basis of sexual orientation in employment, but not in the provision of goods and services. Since 2006, the Penal Code (Estonian: Karistusseadustik) has prohibited public incitement to hatred on the basis of sexual orientation.

According to the Gender Equality and Equal Treatment Commissioner, the prohibition of discrimination on the grounds of sex and/or gender provided by the Gender Equality Act (Estonian: Soolise võrdõiguslikkuse seadus) since 1 May 2004 extends to transgender and non-binary individuals. According to the Act, direct discrimination based on sex (Estonian: otsene sooline diskrimineerimine) also means less favourable treatment of a person in connection with other circumstances related to gender (Estonian: muude soolise kuuluvusega seotud asjaoludega), as well as gender-based harassment and sexual harassment.

An employer has no right to demand that an employee match a gender stereotype, such as a female employee wearing make-up, clothes, or jewelry that are generally considered to be feminine. This also applies to the service sector. As such an employer cannot set barriers for a transgender employee in wearing clothes that match their gender identity. Thus a transgender woman may wear a dress in a work environment, and an employer cannot forbid them from doing so. If a person's identity documents or diploma do not match their appearance or gender identity, then they cannot be treated unfairly at a job interview because of this.

According to a series of interviews conducted with LGBTQ people in 2016, experiences in the workplace split mostly into two. On one hand, some have had no serious problems in their professional life. Their experiences have been more neutral or positive, such as a trans woman being backed by her superior when coming out. On the other hand, some emphasize their negative experiences or problems. Some feel the need to stay in the closet, because they fear a strong reaction from their colleague(s) or employer. Some report a situation at work where the topic is mutually avoided. Even in cases where LGBTQ people report having no troubles and an overall positive environment at work, they still recount having to navigate situations relating to their identity.

=== Hate speech ===
In June 2023, the government of Estonia approved a draft bill to explicitly ban hate speech based on both sexual orientation and gender identity. In the draft, the Ministry of Justice has taken into consideration some of the substantive feedback received during the coordination round. The proposed legislation will be sent to the Riigikogu. The bill passed first reading in September 2023, with the second reading planned for early 2024.

According to the Estonian Human Rights Centre, incitement to hatred is already prohibited by paragraph 151 of the Penal Code, but using it in court is extraordinarily difficult due to the current wording. Only such activity which results in danger to the life, health or property of a person can be punished.

== Gender identity and expression ==
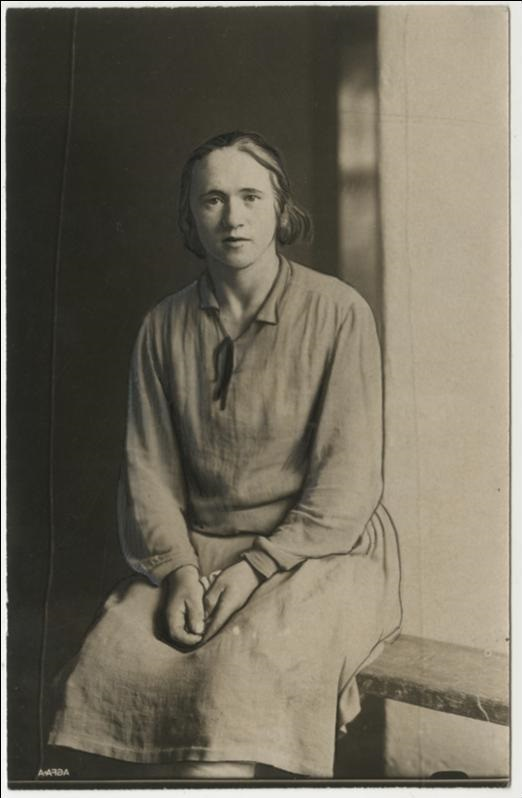
A. Oinatski, originally printed in the newspaper Postimees, 1929

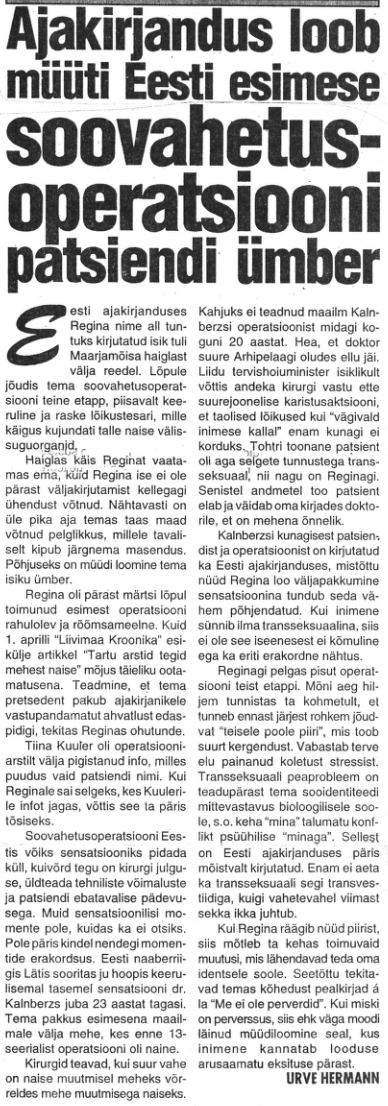
Article in the tabloid newspaper Post, July 1993

=== History ===
A. Oinatski is said to be the first known openly transgender person in Estonia, during the interwar period. A journalist writing for the newspaper Postimees in 1929 is confused on the point whether Oinatski is rather a young man in a dress trying to avoid compulsory military service, or a strange woman with entirely feminine speech and expression. In the same article, Oinatski describes themselves as a woman. They appeared under various pseudonyms. Many newspaper articles were written about them in the period from 1929 to 1934, mostly due to their various run-ins with the law, due to petty theft and fraud. This resulted in many stints in prison. Later they proceeded to return to living as a man at the end of the decade, and married.

Gender reassignment was in essence already possible during the Soviet occupation, under ad-hoc regulation set out by the Ministry of Health of the USSR, after the adoption of the ICD-9 in 1980. This required a long stay in a psychiatric hospital, with no guarantee of success. Some applicants were simply sent back home after a period. Others were given the scientifically discredited diagnosis of sluggish schizophrenia, used by the Soviet state as a means of locking up dissenters. Very few were able to actually transition. At least two Estonian trans men are known to have done so in the late 1980s. Any surgical interventions were considered to be in bad taste by medical professionals, but were sometimes still performed. In the Estonian SSR specifically, regulation dating from 1970 concerning "hermaphrodites" may have been the legal basis for transgender people to correct their legal data.

On 6 April 1992, Kristel Regina became the first trans person in independent Estonia to legally correct her name and gender on her birth certificate. As a university student, she had previously requested and received information concerning transgender people from various university libraries in the West. She had then been meeting with doctors since 1990, who familiarised themselves with the research she had done. A medical expert committee was assembled to assess her case and allowed for gender reassignment. Changing legal data was viewed as a prerequisite to any gender-affirming surgery, as it would have otherwise been considered mutilation. Such surgery was then also carried out afterwards, although the doctor who did so was later professionally, but not legally, reprimanded.

Her case received substantial coverage in the press. A tabloid newspaper said that she had been "born as a woman in the most unique way yet seen in Estonia", and congratulated her on finally receiving a feminine appearance to compliment her feminine being. Other articles provided a detailed background of her struggles. According to her, she first became aware of the possibility of gender reassignment after coming across an article in an East German magazine talking about April Ashley, in 1978. Other coverage was more lurid, prompting a columnist to chide the papers for sensationalising a person "suffering for nature's incomprehensible mistake," claiming that "a person being born a transsexual is in and of itself not anything sensational or especially unusual."

=== Current process ===
The process for gender reassignment was for the first time regulated by a decree of Minister of Social Affairs Tiiu Aro on 24 April 1997, on the Establishment of Mandatory Processes for Gender Reassignment (Estonian: Soovahetuse kohustuslike protseduuride kehtestamine). Legal gender recognition is currently regulated by regulation concerning the Common Requirements for Medical Operations for Gender Reassignment (Estonian: Soovahetuse arstlike toimingute ühtsed nõuded), in force since May 1999, and parts of the Vital Statistics Registration Act (Estonian: Perekonnaseisutoimingute seadus) which entered into force in January 2014.

To begin the process of gender reassignment, a transgender person must submit an application to the Ministry of Social Affairs for the first appointment with the medical expert committee formed for this purpose. They will then receive a ministerial decree from the responsible Minister giving them permission to begin hormone replacement therapy. Since February 2022, undergoing such therapy is no longer mandatory, neither is genetic testing. Surgical intervention is permitted one year after the issue of this directive, but has not been required since April 1997. There is also no requirement for forced sterilization. Minors have access to puberty blockers.

Another application must be submitted to the Ministry for a second appointment with the committee in order for a person's legal data in the Population Register to be corrected. This generally takes place a year after the first appointment with the committee, not earlier. Changing one's legal name may be possible before this, under the Names Act (Estonian: Nimeseadus). Afterwards, the decision of the committee together with a written application must be submitted to a county town local government (Estonian: maakonnakeskuse kohalik omavalitsus). The restoration of the gender at birth can be applied for in the same manner. Other data and vital statistics entries of the person are not changed.

=== Recent developments ===
A new committee was assembled in July 2021 by Minister of Health and Labour Tanel Kiik to replace the previous one in place since March 2000. It had disbanded itself in 2020, creating a situation where no medical or legal procedures were in practice accessible for people wanting to transition. The new committee relies on both self-identification as well as a mental health diagnosis to make a judgement on whether a transition is appropriate. The stated goal of the committee is to help transgender people "function socially in accordance with their gender identity," with them experiencing a state of both mental and physical well-being.

In May 2023, Minister of Social Protection Signe Riisalo expressed an intent to amend the current process of legal gender recognition, saying that a person's right to change their legal data should be based on self-identification. This sentiment is also held by the chairman of the current medical expert committee, Dr. Kai Haldre. According to Minister of Health Riina Sikkut, the matter could be debated in the autumn at the earliest. According to Dr. Haldre and her colleagues, making the process less bureaucratic would free up resources for those who desire medical intervention. She states that non-binary people should be able to mark their gender correctly on identity documents, and countries that allow this have not seen any negative effects.

In the period between 1999 and 2021, a total of 186 people have begun the process of gender reassignment: 91 trans women, and 95 trans men. Since the medical expert committee reconvened in early 2022, it has seen around a hundred applicants.

== Military service ==
Lesbian, gay, bisexual, and transgender people are allowed to serve openly in the military.

Some non-heterosexuals may reportedly be sent for additional medical consultation before being declared fit for military service. Same-sex attraction tendencies are "generally not an obstacle to military service," according to the head of the vocational department at the Defense Resources Agency (Estonian: Kaitseressursside Amet), Merle Ulst. If a prospective conscript or volunteer has a mental or behavioral disorder diagnosis which is "connected to homosexuality," then this "may become an obstacle to military service."

== Living conditions ==
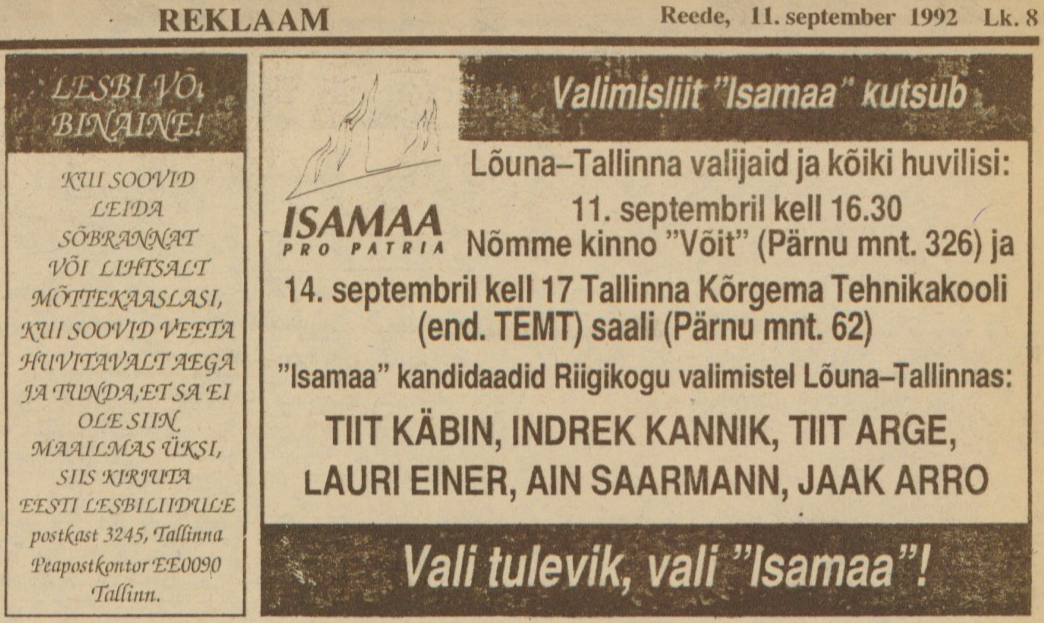
Ad by the Estonian Lesbian Union, September 1992 (left)

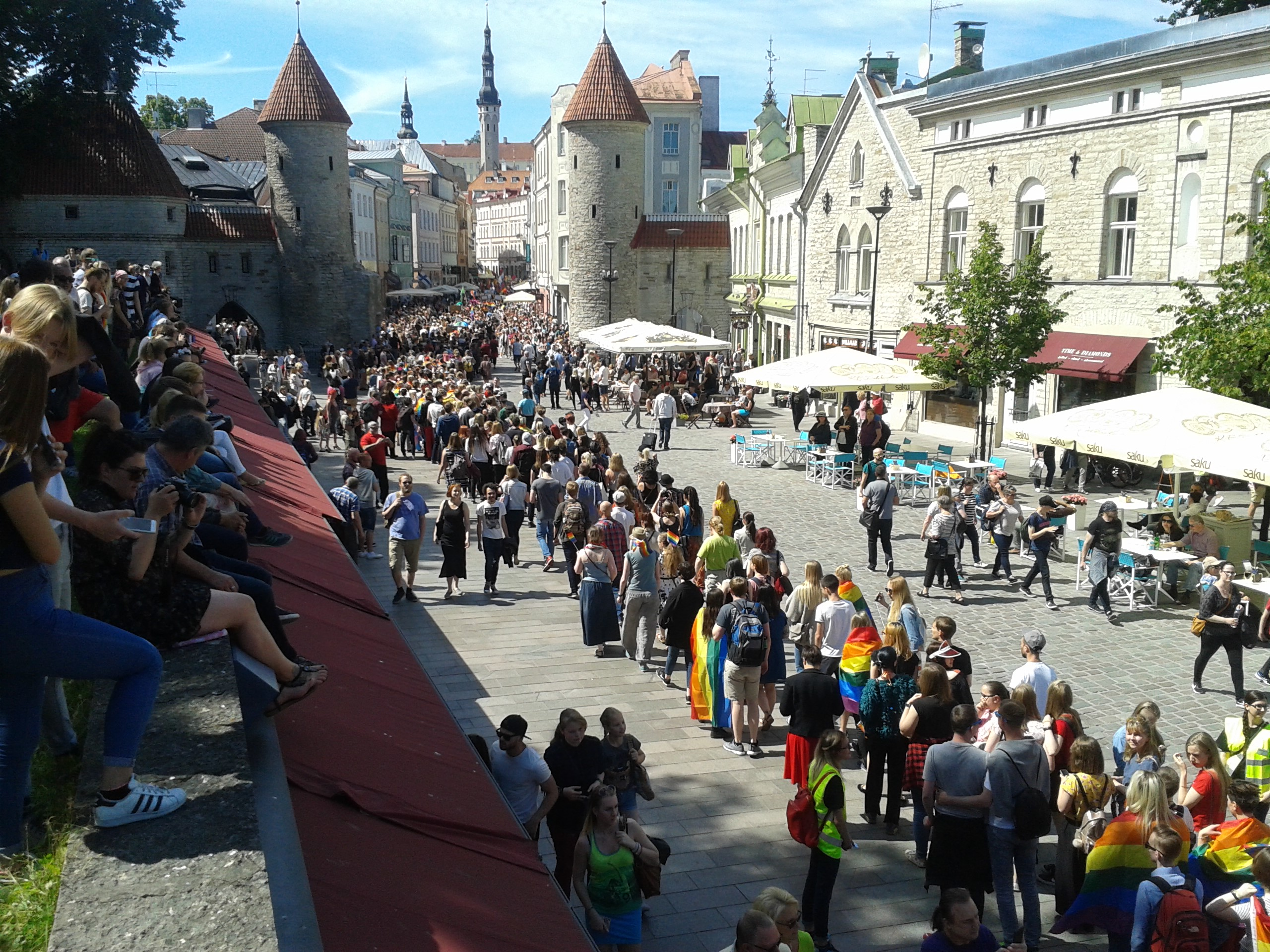
The 2017 edition of Tallinn Pride

=== Community organization ===
Although male homosexuality was illegal until the end of the Soviet occupation in 1991, already in the 1980s, Kastani bar was popular among gay people during the nighttime. There was also at least one cruising area in both Tallinn and Tartu, though outside of these two cities, the gay scene was invisible. The first gay bar in independent Estonia, Pika Kelder, was opened in April 1993, intended mainly for women. X-Baar is the oldest continuously operating LGBTQ bar and community space in both the Baltic states and Estonia, and perhaps the most beloved. It opened on 14 June 1998 as a gay bar, before being bought by its late owner, Sirje Atso. Most recently, a queer community bar, Hungr, was opened in April 2023, in Tallinn, aiming to provide a modern, inclusive, and safe space for LGBTQ people and their friends.

The first conference dedicated to sexual minorities took place in Tallinn in May 1990, leading to the founding of the Estonian Lesbian Union (Estonian: Eesti Lesbiliit) on 13 October of the same year. One of the key organizers was Lilian Kotter, who had spoken at the conference. It was the first LGBTQ association in independent Estonia. It had a monthly newsletter for members, and in December 1992, the Lesbian Union also set up a helpline. While it also had the political ambition of trying to change the attitude of society towards sexual minorities, the main focus was on organizing the fledgling community through various events. These mainly catered to lesbian and bisexual women, transgender people were also accepted. The Lesbian Union was also the driving force behind opening the Pika Kelder bar.

These visible activities were a major factor in people having the courage to come out of the closet. The Estonian Lesbian Union was also a role model for the first association for transgender people in Estonia, Gendy. It was founded on 8 August 1993 and provided a support group for trans individuals. Both organizations were tightly knit, as it was possible to contact Gendy through the Union, with them also distributing information about their activities. Gendy activists also answered questions relating to trans issues through their helpline, once a month. Gendy did not organize any events of its own.

The first association specifically for gay men was the Estonian Gay Union (Estonian: Eesti Gayliit), founded on 2 May 1992. The aim of the organization was to create opportunities for men to socialize between themselves, do HIV/AIDS prevention work, and perform outreach work on issues related to homosexuality. This was focused on spreading awareness and better educating the public about gay issues, dispelling negative stereotypes, as well as encouraging gay men to come out of the closet. The Gay Union also ran a helpline as well as community events, but did not open their own bar. AIDS prevention work included handing out free condoms as well as informational leaflets.

The Estonian LGBT Association (Estonian: Eesti LGBT Ühing) is the main representative for LGBTQ citizens in the present day, having been founded in 2008 as the Estonian Gay Youth (Estonian: Eesti Gay Noored). There also exists an organization specifically for trans and non-binary people, the Estonian Association for Transgender People (Estonian: Eesti Transinimeste Ühing), having grown out of a podcast, founded in 2022.

=== Pride parades ===
Annual Pride parades had been organised in Tallinn since 2004. In an incident in 2007, some of the parade's participants were verbally and physically attacked by anti-gay protesters. After the 2007 violent anti-gay attacks, no Tallinn Pride parade took place until 2017. Some 1,800 people attended the event in 2017. The pride parade also received the backing of numerous foreign embassies, including the American, British, French, German, Latvian and Lithuanian embassies, among many others.

In June 2011, Estonia hosted Baltic Pride. Key speakers at the event included Riho Rahuoja, the Deputy Secretary General for Social Policy at the Ministry of Social Affairs; Christian Veske, the Chief Specialist in the Ministry's Gender Equality Department; Kari Käsper, Project Manager of the "Diversity Enriches" campaign from the Estonian Human Rights Centre; Hanna Kannelmäe from the Estonian Gay Youth NGO; U.S. Ambassador to Estonia Michael C. Polt; British Ambassador to Estonia Peter Carter and British LGBTQ activist Clare Dimyon, who exhibited "Proud of our Identity" at Tallinn's Solaris Center on 31 March. "Proud of our Identity" comprises photographs of and by lesbian, gay, bisexual and transgender people taken at various Pride events throughout Europe, including photographs of Estonian LGBTQ people.

Tallinn hosts Baltic Pride every three years, it most recently did so in 2026. 7000 people marched in the 2023 Baltic Pride parade. This included the speaker of the Riigikogu, Lauri Hussar; the Minister of Foreign Affairs, Margus Tsahkna; Minister of Health, Riina Sikkut; Minister of Education and Research, Kristina Kallas; the Gender Equality and Equal Treatment Commissioner, Christian Veske; and representatives of NATO and multiple foreign embassies.

=== Social attitudes ===
Discrimination and prejudice against LGBTQ persons remain a significant problem in several parts of Estonian society.

In June 2006, Dutch Ambassador to Estonia Hans Glaubitz requested he be transferred to the Dutch consulate in Canada after he had reportedly been suffering from repeated homophobic and racial verbal abuse being hurled by some locals in Tallinn against his partner, an Afro-Cuban dancer Raúl García Lao. A statement subsequently released by the Estonian authorities stated that they "regretted the incidents very much".

In February 2019, the LGBTQ association SevenBow, organizers of the Festheart LGBTI film festival, sued the Rakvere City Council for cutting their funding by 80%. The city's Cultural Affairs Committee initially endorsed the group's funding applications, but the City Council cut its funding to just a fifth of the applied sum. Lawyers argued that anti-gay views motivated the cutback. In May 2019, an administrative court ruled that the council's decision to provide less funding was unlawful. It ruled that the council had no justification to give a smaller grant to SevenBow. The court added that the council had also not raised an appropriate legal basis which would have allowed it to deviate from the decision drawn up by the Cultural Affairs Committee.

On 11 June 2023, during a small speaking event organized by an association of gay Christians at the X-Baar, a visiting Finnish pastor and others were violently assaulted by a 25-year-old Estonian-speaking Russian citizen in a homophobic hate crime. The man yelled about God's wrath against homosexuals in Russian, punching the pastor in the face and stabbing a woman sitting next to him with a knife. The suspect was arrested by police at the scene after he was wrestled down by bar staff and spectators, and charged with a serious breach of public order. The man is previously known to police, as he had been fined for appearing in a public place on Victory Day with prohibited insignia supporting Russia's invasion of Ukraine, for which he had been given a monetary fine. Minister of the Interior Lauri Läänemets confirmed that he can be deported from the country. He added that words have consequences when politicians or religious leaders "systematically belittle the rights and freedoms of a minority in their public speeches, sooner or later such thoughtless or, on the contrary, very well-thought-out opposing language can become a crime at the hands of some radicalized fanatics."

On 14 July 2023, a Russian-speaking man who murdered a Jamaican trans woman whom he had met in a Tallinn Old Town bar in 2022 was sentenced to 12 years in jail. The judge gave the defendant a harsh sentence due to the severity of the crime, as she had been stabbed more than 34 times whilst trying to flee. The defense had argued for a lesser sentence, claiming that the attack was provoked by the victim. This was contradicted by the victim having to ask the man's friend to tell him that she was transgender, as the defendant does not speak any English. She also asked the defendant's friend whether the defendant was comfortable with intercourse a second time. The victim had fled from her native country in 2009 due to negative attitudes towards transgender people. She had been working as an escort, and was always open about her transgender identity and conscious about her safety.

== Public opinion ==
According to a survey conducted in 2000, 50% of surveyed men and 63% of women agreed with the statement "Homosexuality among adults is a private affair of the people concerned with which officials of the law should in no way interfere"; 29% of men and 25% of women found it hard to say what their position was.

A Eurobarometer survey published in December 2006 showed that 21% of Estonians surveyed supported same-sex marriage and 14% supported the right of same-sex couples to adopt (EU-wide average: 44% and 33%, respectively).

According to a Eurobarometer survey published in 2008, only 13 percent of Estonians professed to have homosexual friends or acquaintances, compared to a 34 percent average in the EU. However, Estonians ranked higher than the European average in willingness to grant equal opportunities to sexual minorities.

A poll conducted in June 2009 showed that 32% of Estonians believed that same-sex couples should have the same legal rights as opposite-sex couples. Support was 40% among young people, but only 6% among older people.

A poll conducted in September 2012 found that 34% of Estonians supported same-sex marriage and 46% supported registered partnerships (in contrast to 60% and 45% that shared the opposing stance respectively). The poll found an ethnic divide: while 51% of ethnic Estonians supported registered partnerships, only 21% of ethnic Russians were of the same view.

The same poll conducted in 2014 during the parliamentary debate on registered partnership revealed that the support dropped significantly with only 29% and 40% of respondents supporting same-sex marriage and registered partnership legislation respectively, and the level of opposition on both issues had increased to 64% and 54%.

The 2015 Eurobarometer survey showed that 44% of Estonians supported gay, lesbian and bisexual people having the same equal rights as heterosexuals, while 45% were opposed. 40% of Estonians believed there is nothing wrong with homosexual relationships and 49% disagreed, while 31% of Estonians supported same-sex marriage and 58% were against it.

A poll conducted between 28 March 2017 to 10 April 2017 found that, while support for same-sex registered partnership legislation was unchanged in three years (45% vs 46%), support for same-sex marriages had increased to 39% with 52% against (compared to 60% against in 2012 and 64% against in 2014). It also found that acceptance of homosexuality had increased from 34% in 2012 to 41% in 2017, with 52% against. At the same time, support for joint adoption rights remained unchanged with 66% opposing such legislation.

A public opinion survey conducted in 2019 showed that 49% of Estonians supported same-sex registered partnerships and 39% opposed them.

The 2019 Eurobarometer found that 41% of Estonians thought same-sex marriage should be allowed throughout Europe; 51% were against it.

A public opinion survey conducted between 1 April 2021 to 18 April 2021 found that 53% of the respondents consider same-sex attraction completely or somewhat acceptable, 42% did not. 64% of respondents believed that someone who was born a man could identify as a woman (and vice versa), while 20% disagreed. 47% considered transgender people to be completely or somewhat acceptable, while 39% did not. In addition, 64% of respondents support or somewhat support the Registered Partnership Act, and 47% support same-sex marriages, with 46% against.

A poll conducted in March 2023 by the Liberal Citizen Foundation (Estonian: Sihtasutus Liberaalne Kodanik, SALK) found that 44.9% of respondents were in favour of same-sex marriage (24.6% "fully" and 20.3% "somewhat") and 43.4% were against (29.3% "fully" and 14.1% "somewhat"). 11.7% did not answer.

A poll conducted between 3 April 2023 and 12 April 2023 found that 56% of Estonians consider same-sex attraction completely or somewhat acceptable, 39% did not. 53% support same-sex marriage, with 39% opposed. 47% support adoption for married same-sex couples, with 44% opposed. 55% support a hate speech law, with 32% opposed. 71% support the Registered Partnership Act. 61% of respondents believed that someone who was born a man could identify as a woman (and vice versa), while 24% disagreed. 47% considered transgender people to be completely or somewhat acceptable, while 37% did not.

A public opinion survey conducted between 18 May 2023 and 22 May 2023 found that 55% of Estonians (62% of ethnic Estonians and 41% of other nationalities) think that marriage equality provides all people with the same rights and responsibilities, without lessening the rights of anyone else. 37% do not agree with such a statement.

The 2023 Eurobarometer found that 41% of Estonians thought same-sex marriage should be allowed throughout Europe, and 51% agreed that "there is nothing wrong in a sexual relationship between two persons of the same sex".

According to the 2026 opinion survey by the Estonian Human Rights Centre, 53% of Estonians supported same-sex marriage. The support was higher among Estonian speakers (60%) compared to non-Estonian speakers (38%), mostly Russian. The support was higher among 18 to 29 age group (82%).

== Summary table ==
Same-sex sexual activity legal	Yes (Legal between 1935 and 1940; legal again since 1992)
Equal age of consent (16)	Yes (Since 2002)
Anti-discrimination laws in employment	Yes (Since 2004)
Anti-discrimination laws in the provision of goods and services	Yes
Anti-discrimination laws in all other areas (incl. indirect discrimination, hate speech)	Yes (Since 2008)
Anti-discrimination laws concerning gender identity	Yes (Since 2004, implicit protection under "other circumstances related to gender" according to the Gender Equality and Equal Treatment Commissioner)
Same-sex marriage	Yes (Since 2024)
Recognition of same-sex couples	Yes (Since 2016)
Stepchild adoption by same-sex couples	Yes (Since 2016)
Joint adoption by same-sex couples	Yes (Since 2024)
Adoption by a single LGBTQ person	Yes
LGBTQ people allowed to serve openly in the military	Yes (Never banned)
Right to change legal gender	Yes (Since 1992)
Right to change legal gender without having to end marriage	Yes (Since 2021)
Gender self-identification	Yes
Access to IVF for lesbian couples	Yes (Since 1997, all women regardless of their sexual orientation have the right to access IVF)
Conversion therapy banned for minors	No
Automatic parenthood on birth certificates for children of same-sex couples conceived via IVF	No
Commercial or altruistic surrogacy for gay male couples	No (Banned for all couples regardless of sexual orientation)
MSMs allowed to donate blood	Yes (Since 2022, no deferral period since 1 March 2024)

== See also ==
- Human rights in Estonia
- LGBT rights in Europe
- LGBT rights in the European Union
- Recognition of same-sex unions in Europe
