= Peeter Raudsepp =

Mayor of Tallinn, business executive

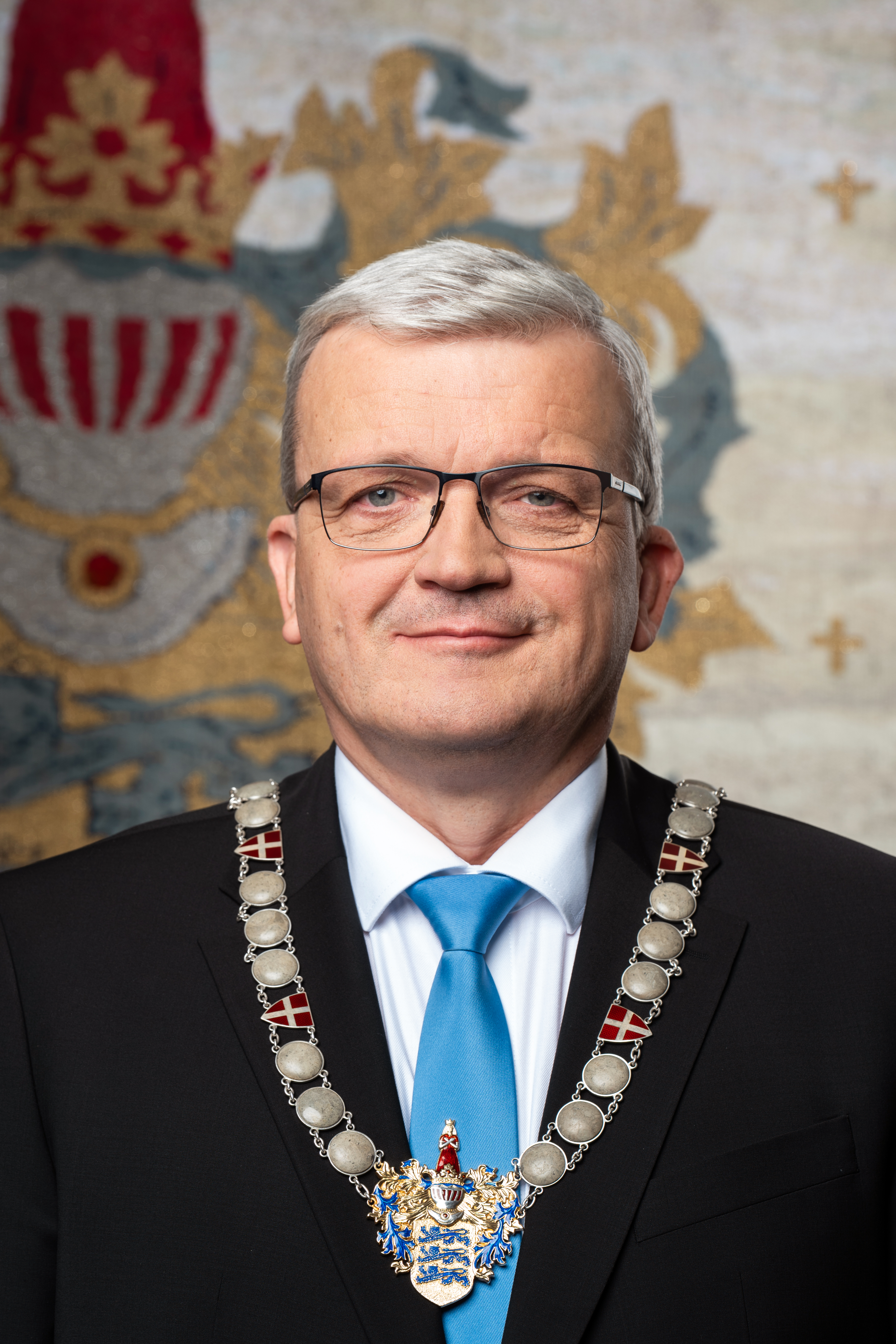
- Peeter Raudsepp in 2025

Mayor of Tallinn
- Incumbent
- Assumed office 8 December 2025
- Preceded by: Jevgeni Ossinovski

Personal details
- Born: 24 May 1970

Peeter Raudsepp (born 24 May 1970) is an Estonian business executive, politician, and the current Mayor of Tallinn.

== Education and career ==
Peeter Raudsepp graduated from the University of Tartu, majoring in finance and credit in the School of Economics and Business Administration.

Raudsepp had worked as a manager for several companies and organizations.

== Political career ==
On 28 November 2025, the Isamaa party nominated Raudsepp as a candidate for Mayor of Tallinn. On 8 December 2025, the Tallinn City Council elected Peeter Raudsepp as Mayor of Tallinn. In the secret ballot, Raudsepp received 46 votes in favor. At least 40 votes were required for election. A total of 74 council members participated in the vote. According to the power-sharing agreement between Isamaa and the Estonian Centre Party, he will serve as mayor for two years, after which the position will pass to the Estonian Centre Party.

== Personal life ==
Peeter Raudsepp is associated with the Tallinn Jaani congregation of the Estonian Evangelical Lutheran Church, where he is an active member and participates in the congregation's activities.

== See also ==
- List of mayors of Tallinn
