= Urmas Kruuse =

Estonian politician (born 1965)

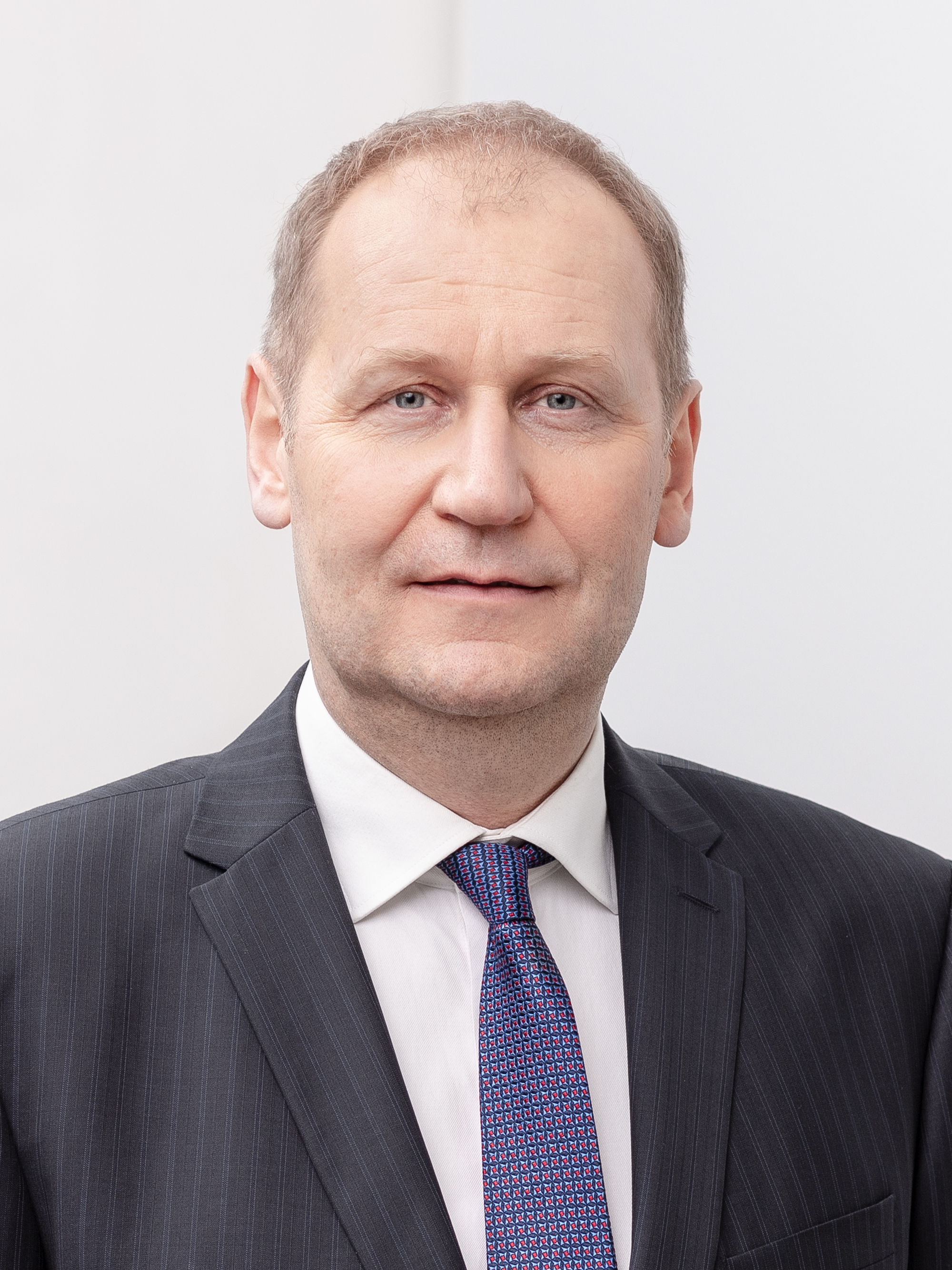
- Urmas Kruuse in 2021

Minister of Rural Affairs
- In office 26 January 2021 – 17 April 2023
- Prime Minister: Kaja Kallas
- Preceded by: Arvo Aller
- In office 9 April 2015 – 23 November 2016
- Prime Minister: Taavi Rõivas
- Preceded by: Ivari Padar (as Minister of Agriculture)
- Succeeded by: Martin Repinski

Minister of Health and Labour
- In office 26 March 2014 – 30 March 2015
- Prime Minister: Taavi Rõivas
- Preceded by: Taavi Rõivas (as Minister of Social Affairs)
- Succeeded by: Rannar Vassiljev

Mayor of Tartu
- In office 26 April 2007 – 26 March 2014
- Preceded by: Laine Jänes
- Succeeded by: Urmas Klaas

Personal details
- Born: 14 July 1965 (age 61) Elva, then part of Estonian SSR, Soviet Union
- Party: Reform Party
- Education: International University Audentes

Urmas Kruuse (born 14 July 1965) is an Estonian politician who was the Minister of Rural Affairs from 2021 to 2023. From 2014 to 2015, he was the Minister of Health and Labour. He is a member of the Estonian Reform Party.

== Early life ==
Urmas Kruuse graduated from Elva Secondary School and obtained a degree in business management at International University Audentes. From 1997 to 1999, he worked as sales manager at Siberry Rebase Hulgiladu and from 1999 to 2002, as sales manager of Kesko Food AS. Kruuse has also been active as a freelance musician and has worked as a warehouse operator at Tallinna Tööstuskaubastu.

== Political career ==
From 2002 to 2007, Kruuse was Mayor of his hometown Elva and from 2007 to 2014, the Mayor of Tartu.

Kruuse became the Minister of Health and Labour in Taavi Rõivas' first cabinet on 26 March 2014 and the Minister of Rural Affairs on 9 April 2015 in Taavi Rõivas' second cabinet.

Political offices
Preceded by Aare Anderson	Mayor of Elva; 2002–2007	Succeeded by Reno Laidre
Preceded by Laine Jänes	Mayor of Tartu; 2007–2014	Succeeded by Urmas Klaas
Preceded by Taavi Rõivas as Minister of Social Affairs	Minister of Health and Labour; 2014–2015	Succeeded by Rannar Vassiljev
Preceded by Ivari Padar as Minister of Agriculture	Minister of Rural Affairs; 2015–2016	Succeeded by Martin Repinski
Preceded by Arvo Aller	Minister of Rural Affairs; 2021–present	Incumbent
