= Kaia Iva =

Estonian politician (1964–2023)

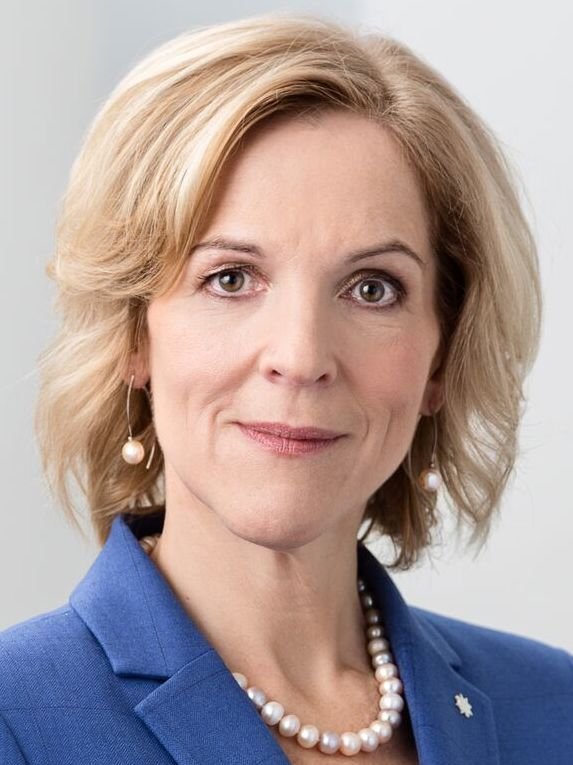
- Kaia Iva in 2017

Minister of Social Protection
- In office 23 November 2016 – 29 April 2019
- Prime Minister: Jüri Ratas
- Preceded by: Margus Tsahkna
- Succeeded by: Tanel Kiik (as Minister of Social Affairs)

Personal details
- Born: 28 April 1964 Türi, then part of Estonian SSR, Soviet Union
- Died: 2 November 2023 (aged 59)
- Party: Pro Patria and Res Publica Union
- Education: Tallinn University

Kaia Iva (28 April 1964 – 2 November 2023) was an Estonian Pro Patria and Res Publica Union politician. She was Minister of Social Protection of Estonia from 23 November 2016. She served as the mayor of Türi from 2002 until 2005. She served as a member of Riigikogu from 2007 to 2015.

Kaia Iva died on 2 November 2023, at the age of 59.

Political offices
Preceded by Margus Tsahkna	Minister of Social Protection; 2016–2019	Succeeded by Tanel Kiik
