= Minister of Economy and Industry =

Estonian cabinet position

- Incumbent; Erkki Keldo since 23 July 2024
- Ministry of Economic Affairs and Communications
- Appointer: Prime Minister

The Minister of Economy and Industry of Estonia (Estonian: Majandus- ja tööstusminister) is a minister at the Ministry of Economic Affairs and Communications (Estonian: Majandus- ja Kommunikatsiooniministeerium) in the Estonian Government.

== List of ministers ==
Name	Portrait	Party	Term of office		Duration	Prime Minister
Minister of Economic Affairs and Infrastructure
Urve Palo		Social Democratic	26 March 2014	9 April 2015	1 year, 14 days	Rõivas (I)
Kristen Michal		Reform	9 April 2015	23 November 2016	1 year, 228 days	Rõivas (II)
Kadri Simson		Centre	23 November 2016	29 April 2019	2 years, 157 days	Ratas (I)
Taavi Aas		Centre	29 April 2019	3 June 2022	7 years, 131 days	Ratas (II) Kallas (I)
Riina Sikkut		Social Democratic	18 July 2022	17 April 2023	273 days	Kallas (II)
Minister of Economic Affairs and Information Technology
Tiit Riisalo		Estonia 200	17 April 2023	23 July 2024	3 years, 143 days	Kallas (III)
Minister of Economy and Industry
Erkki Keldo		Reform	23 July 2024		2 years, 46 days	Michal (I)

== See also ==
- Ministry of Economic Affairs and Communications
