= Taavi Aas =

Estonian politician (born 1966)

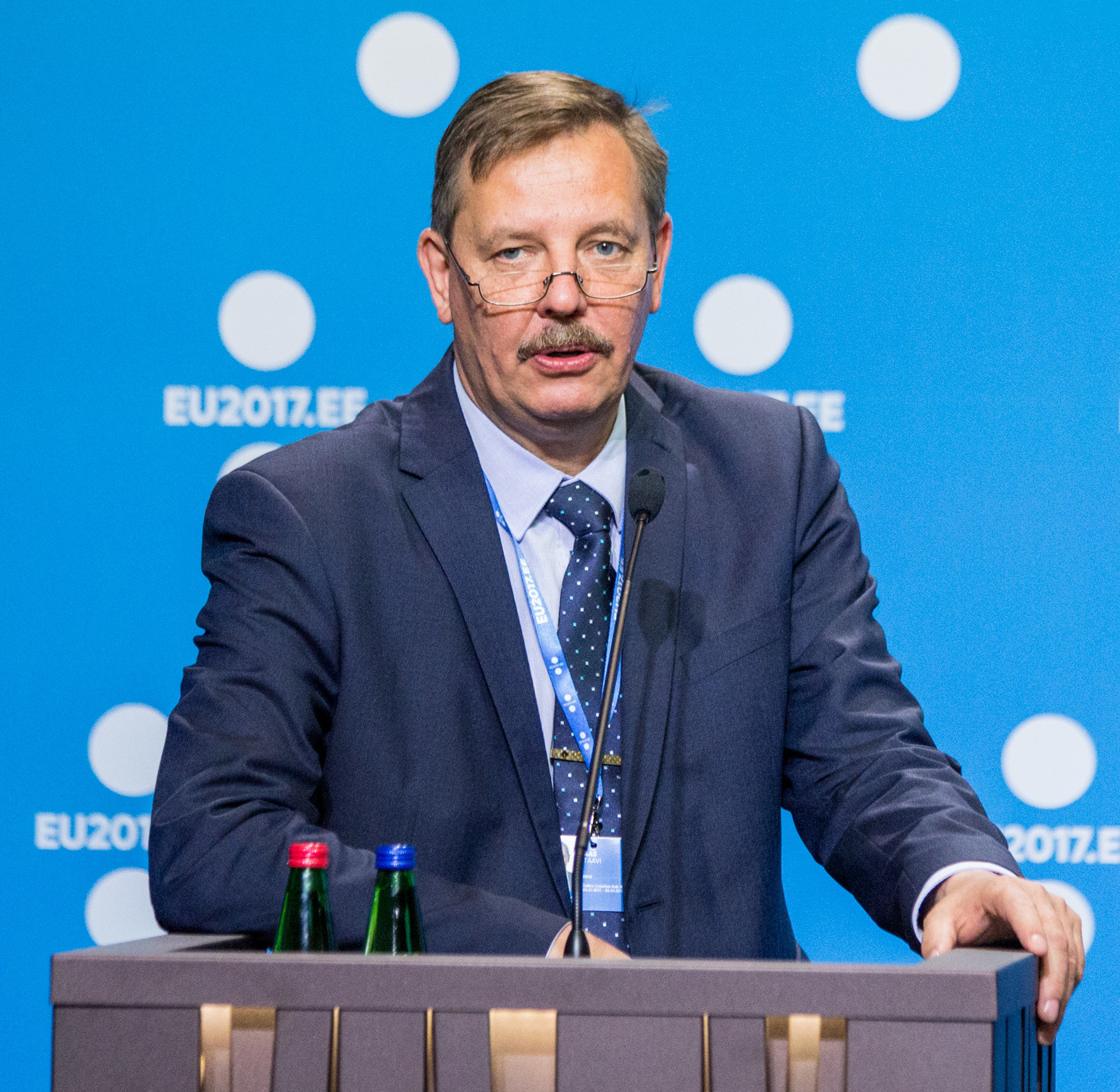
- Aas in 2017

Minister of Economic Affairs and Infrastructure
- In office 29 April 2019 – 3 June 2022
- Prime Minister: Jüri Ratas; Kaja Kallas
- Preceded by: Kadri Simson
- Succeeded by: Riina Sikkut

Mayor of Tallinn
- In office 9 November 2017 – 4 April 2019
- Preceded by: Edgar Savisaar
- Succeeded by: Mihhail Kõlvart

Personal details
- Born: 10 January 1966 (age 60) Tallinn, then part of Estonian SSR, Soviet Union
- Party: Centre (2002–2023)
- Education: Estonian University of Life Sciences

Taavi Aas (born 10 January 1966) is an Estonian politician who served as Minister of Economic Affairs and Infrastructure from 2019 to 2022.

== Early life and education ==
Aas was born on 10 January 1966 in Tallinn.

He graduated from the Estonian University of Life Sciences in 1991, with a degree in Economics and Organization. He speaks Estonian, English, Russian, and Finnish.

== Career ==
Aas served as Mayor of Tallinn from 2017 to 2019. Before that, he served as the Acting Mayor of Tallinn since 30 September 2015 and Vice Mayor of Tallinn from April 2005. Aas has been the Chairman of Estonian Union of the Cities since 2010. As the Vice Mayor, he coordinated the work of the Tallinn City Planning Office and the Tallinn Transportation Office, managing the reconstruction of Freedom Square (Vabaduse Väljak) and the transition to free public transportation in Tallinn in 2013. Aas became the Acting Mayor of Tallinn in September 2015 after the suspension of the duties of Mayor Edgar Savisaar by the Harju Land Court. In March 2017 Aas admitted he was ready to run as the candidate for Mayor of the ruling Center Party. In the 2019 parliamentary election, Aas was elected into the Riigikogu, due to which he resigned as mayor. He was succeeded by Mihhail Kõlvart. On 29 April 2019, he was sworn in as the Minister of Economic Affairs and Infrastructure in Jüri Ratas' second cabinet.

Political offices
Preceded by Edgar Savisaar	Mayor of Tallinn; 2015–2019	Succeeded by Mihhail Kõlvart
