= Kadri Simson =

Estonian politician

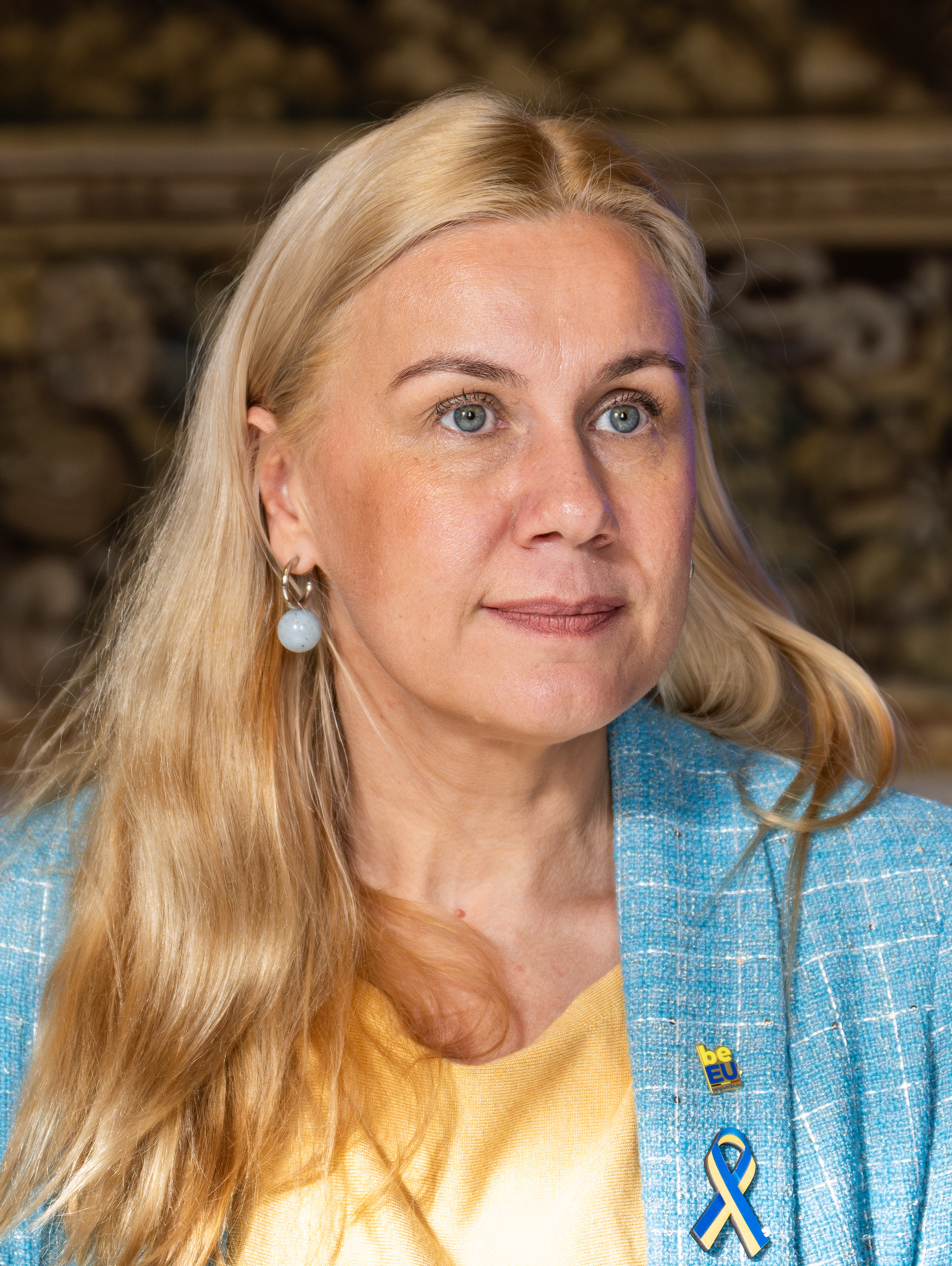
- Simson in 2024

European Commissioner for Energy
- In office 1 December 2019 – 30 November 2024
- Commission: Von der Leyen I
- Preceded by: Miguel Arias Cañete
- Succeeded by: Dan Jørgensen

Minister of Economic Affairs and Infrastructure
- In office 23 November 2016 – 29 April 2019
- Prime Minister: Jüri Ratas
- Preceded by: Kristen Michal
- Succeeded by: Taavi Aas

Personal details
- Born: Kadri Must; 22 January 1977 (age 49) Tartu, then part of Estonian SSR, Soviet Union
- Party: SDE (2026-present)
- Other political affiliations: Centre (1995-2024)
- Education: University of Tartu; University College London
- Kadri Simson's voice Speech delivered by Simson to the European Nuclear Safety Regulators Group Conference; Recorded 30 May 2022

Kadri Simson (née Must, born 22 January 1977) is an Estonian politician of the Social Democratic Party, who served as the European Commissioner for Energy in the von der Leyen Commission between 2019 and 2024, then as a member of the Centre Party.

== Early life ==
Simson graduated from Tartu 10th Middle School in 1995, Tartu University in 2000, (majoring in history). She holds an MA in Political Science from University College London (2003). Simson was a board member of the NGO Institute of Recent Studies.

== Political career ==
Simson was a member of the Estonian Centre Party from 1995 to 2024. She worked as an advisor to the Tallinn City Government in 1999, later Tallinn Mayor between 2001 and 2002. Simson served as chairwoman of the Pärnumaa region from 2011 until 2021.

In 2015, Simson failed to beat party leader Edgar Savisaar for his role after an almost uninterrupted 25-year tenure. Savisaar won the vote of 541 delegates, to Simson's 486, from a total of 1,051.

In December 2024, Simson announced that she would be leaving the Centre Party.

In October 2026, Simson announced she would be joining the Social Democratic Party and running the 2027 Estonian parliamentary election.

== Other activities ==
- Paris Peace Forum, Member of the Global Council for Responsible Transition Minerals (since 2025)

== Personal life ==
Between 6 June 2008 and February 2015, Simson was married to journalist Priit Simson. Afterwards, she began a relationship with former chairman of HKScan Estonia, Teet Soorm.

Political offices
Preceded by Kristen Michal	Minister of Economic Affairs and Infrastructure; 2016–2019	Succeeded by Taavi Aas
Preceded by Andrus Ansip	Estonian European Commissioner; 2019–2024	Succeeded by Kaja Kallas
