= Tallinn City Council =

Local representative body

Tallinn City Council Tallinna linnavolikogu
- 11th Tallinn City Council

History
- Founded: 1892

Leadership
- Chair: Mihhail Kõlvart, Centre
- Vice Chair: Sven Sester, Isamaa

Structure
- Seats: 79
- Political groups: Government (48): Centre (37); Isamaa (11); Opposition (31): SDE (17); Reform (7); Parempoolsed (6); Independent (1)
- Committees: 10 committees: Education and Culture Committee; Innovation Committee; Environment and Climate Committee; Order and Consumer Protection Committee; City Planning Committee; City Property Committee; Finance Committee; Audit Committee; Social Welfare and Health Care Committee; Judicial Committee
- Length of term: 4 years

Elections
- Last election: 19 October 2025
- Next election: no later than October 2029

Meeting place
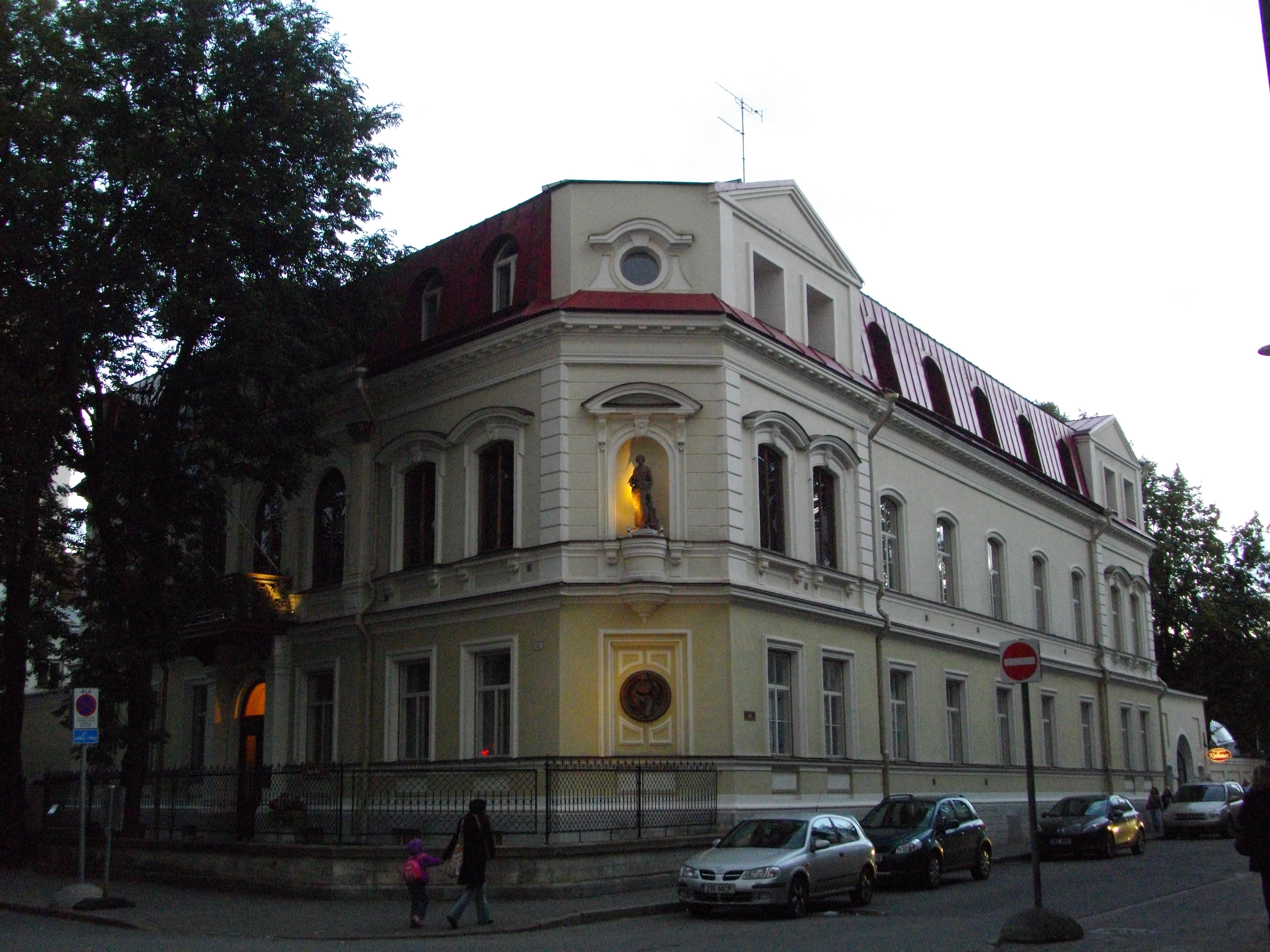
- Vana-Viru 12, Tallinn

Website
- https://www.tallinn.ee/en/tallinn-city-council

Tallinn City Council (Estonian: Tallinna linnavolikogu) is the representative body of the municipality of Tallinn, the capital and biggest city of Estonia.

The executive power body of Tallinn is the Tallinn City Government.

== Election ==
The members of the Tallinn City Council are elected by residents of the city who have the right to vote on the basis of the Local Government Council Election Act (Estonian citizens and citizens of the European Union who have attained 18 years of age by election day, as well as aliens who reside in Estonia on the basis of a long-term residence permit or the right of permanent residence) for a duration of four years. The most recent election took place in 2021 with its members taking office on 11 November 2021.

== Organisation ==
The Tallinn City Council works as a plenary assembly. The working bodies of the city council are the leadership, permanent and temporary committees and factions. A faction can be formed by five or more members of the city council who have been elected according to the same electoral list. City council members belonging to the same electoral list can only form one faction.

The City Council issues regulations as legislation of general application and adopts resolutions as individual acts.

The organisation of the city council's affairs, economic services and the work of the city council, its committees and factions are ensured by the City Council Office.

Regular sittings of the city council are held on Thursdays of every even week, starting at 16:00. The Mayor also participates in sittings, and in the case of their absence is substituted by one of the deputy mayors.

Under the city council’s sole jurisdiction are:

- adoption and alteration of the city budget, establishing, changing and repealing of local taxes;
- granting support;
- adoption of the Tallinn development plan;
- forming and dissolution of districts, determination of their jurisdictions and approval of statutes;
- election of the mayor and releasing them from office;
- approval of the number, structure and candidates of the city administration.

== List of City Council chairs ==
- 1892–1905 Johann Karl Etienne Girard de Soucanton
- 1905–1909 Jaan Poska
- 1909–1913 Nikolai Groševoi
- 1913–1917 Friedrich Karl Akel
- 1917–1918 Jaan Anvelt
- 1918–1919 Nikolai Köstner
- 1919–1930 Rudolf Paabo
- 1930–1934 August Rei
- 1934–1937 Rudolf Kuuskmaa
- 1937–1939 Rudolf Paabo
- 1989–1992 Andres Kork
- 1992–1993 Sulev Mäeltsemees
- 1993–1995, Tiit Vähi (Coalition)
- 1995–1996 Koit Kaaristu (Coalition)
- 1996 Mart Laar (Pro Patria Union)
- 1996–1999 Edgar Savisaar (Centre)
- 1999–2001 Rein Voog (Reform)
- 2001–2005 Maret Maripuu (Reform)
- 2005 Edgar Savisaar (Centre)
- 2005–2015 Toomas Vitsut (Centre)
- 2015–2017 Kalev Kallo (Centre)
- 2017–2019 Mihhail Kõlvart (Centre)
- 2019–2021 Tiit Terik (Centre)
- 2021–2023 Jevgeni Ossinovski (SDE)
- 2023–2024 Maris Sild (SDE)
- 2024–2025 Toomas Kruusimägi (Reform)
- 2025– Mihhail Kõlvart (Centre)

== History ==
On 26 March 1877, the General Russian Town Law came into force in Tallinn and formed a Duma on the basis of Lübeck law, elected for four years. The Duma elected a four-member Tallinn City Government and Mayor. The first Duma elections took place in 1877, a 72-member city council was elected.

On the basis of the General Russian Town Law, the right to vote was given to all subjects of the Russian Empire who were at least 25 years old, had lived in the city of Tallinn for at least 2 years and owned real estate or a company in the city. Until 1892, voters were divided into 3 classes (curias) based on the amount of taxes paid to the city, each of which had the right to appoint one third of the 72 members of the Duma, who were elected for four years.

In the first Duma elections held in December 1877, 86 citizens belonged to the first curia, 281 to the second and 1610 to the third. Thus, only nearly 5% of the city's residents ended up represented. The first two curias consisted mostly of Germans, while the third consisted of many wealthy Russians and Estonians.

From 1892, voters were divided into 6 sections based on police station locations, and each section elected a certain number of city councilors according to its size. The changes that year also included making the property census stricter, reducing the number of Duma members, narrowing the powers of the city government, and expanding those of the governor of the Governorate of Estonia.

In the December 1904 Duma elections, the joint Estonian-Russian electoral bloc achieved a majority for the first time in history. 37 Estonians, 4 Russians and 19 Germans were elected to the 60-member Duma. the Estonians joined the Russians as one bloc and achieved a 2/3 majority.

Based on the new regulations of the Provisional Government on 15 April 1917, a new election was held in August 1917 on the basis of the principles of general, uniform, and proportional elections with a secret ballot. In the election held on 19 August 1917, 101 deputies were elected. The Bolsheviks (31 seats), the Estonian Socialist Revolutionary Party (22) and Mensheviks (12) clinched a majority of the seats and elected Jaan Anvelt as the Chair.

Soon after the Estonian Declaration of Independence, a new election for the city council was once again held.

From 2005 to 2021, the Centre Party had held an absolute majority in the council, though was forced to enter a coalition with the Social Democrats in order to remain in power after losing the absolute majority in 2021. The coalition collapsed on 26 March 2024 as the Social Democrats joined the opposition in voting for the motion of no confidence in mayor Mihhail Kõlvart.

2025 Tallinn City Council

2021 Tallinn City Council

== See also ==
- Riga City Council
- City Council of Helsinki
