= Jevgeni Ossinovski =

Mayor of Tallinn

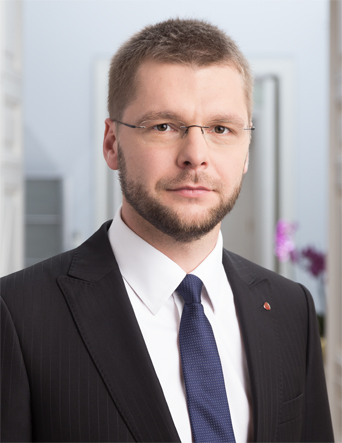
- Jevgeni Ossinovski in 2015

Leader of the Social Democratic Party
- In office 30 May 2015 – 9 June 2019
- Preceded by: Sven Mikser
- Succeeded by: Indrek Saar

Mayor of Tallinn
- In office 14 April 2024 – 8 December 2025
- Preceded by: Mihhail Kõlvart
- Succeeded by: Peeter Raudsepp

Minister of Health and Labour
- In office 14 September 2015 – 2 May 2018
- Prime Minister: Taavi Rõivas; Jüri Ratas
- Preceded by: Rannar Vassiljev
- Succeeded by: Riina Sikkut

Minister of Education and Research
- In office 26 March 2014 – 9 April 2015
- Prime Minister: Taavi Rõivas
- Preceded by: Jaak Aaviksoo
- Succeeded by: Jürgen Ligi

Member of the Riigikogu
- In office 4 April 2011 – 14 April 2024

Personal details
- Born: 15 March 1986 (age 40) Kohtla-Järve, then part of Estonian SSR, Soviet Union
- Party: Social Democratic Party (2011–present)
- Spouse: Triinu Ossinovski (m. 2014)
- Children: 2
- Education: University of Tartu (BA); University of Warwick (MA); London School of Economics (MSc)

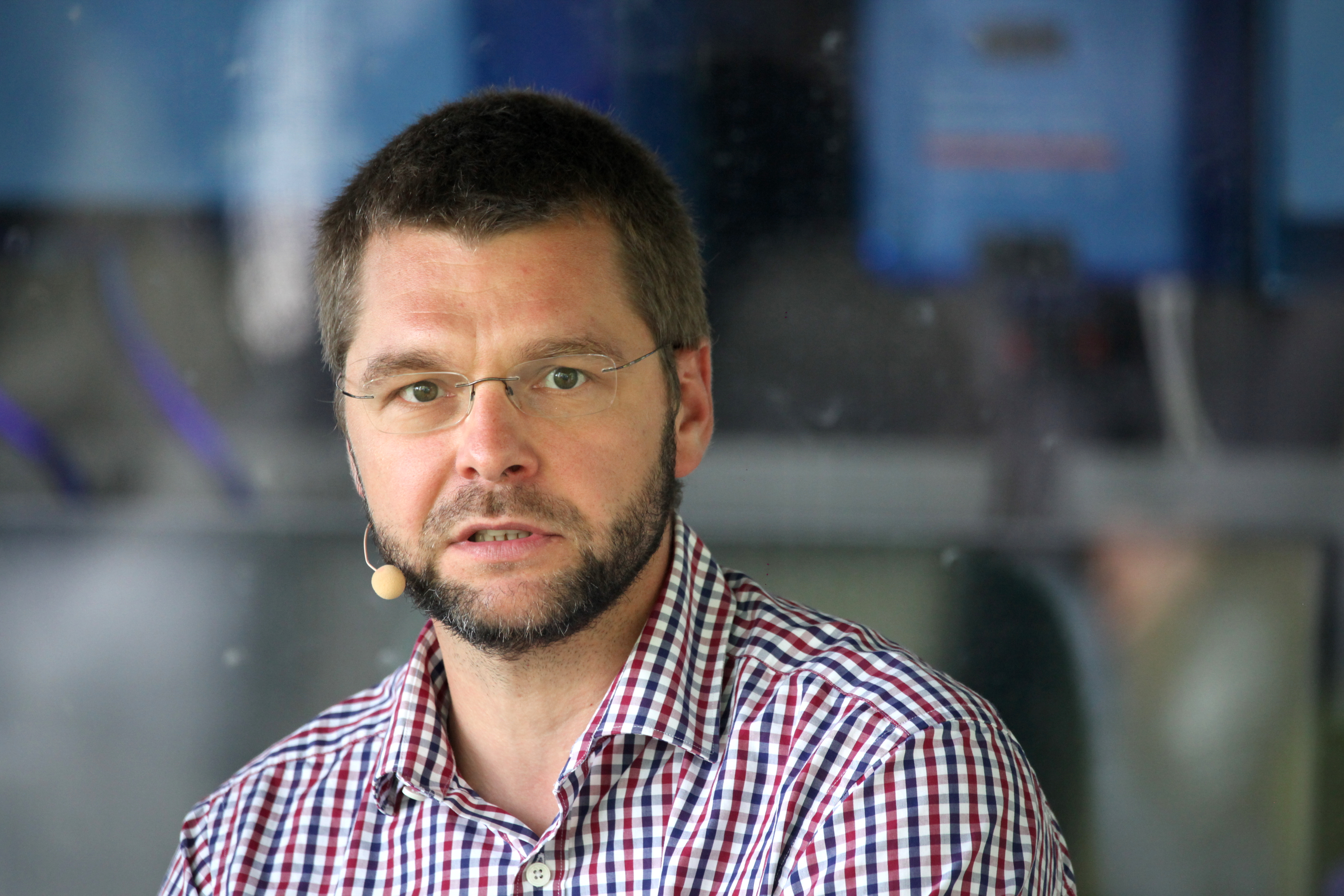
Jevgeni Ossinovski at the Opinion Festival 2021 in Paide, Estonia

Jevgeni Ossinovski (born 15 March 1986) is an Estonian politician, formerly the mayor of Tallinn and former leader of the Estonian Social Democratic Party.

Ossinovski was voted as mayor in an especial meeting of the city council after the no confidence motion of his predecessor Mihhail Kõlvart. The four political parties that voted against Kõlvart, previously held coalition meetings for the last 2 weeks to make agreements. The mayor’s position to be given to the Social Democratic party was in that agreement.

After the October 2025 Tallinn city council elections, Ossinovski lost the mayoral position and on 8 December he was replaced by Peeter Raudsepp.

== Early life and education ==
He is the son of Oleg Ossinovski (et), a prominent Russian railway industrialist who moved to Estonia from Kazakhstan in the 1980s.

London School of Economics and Political Science has awarded him MSc in Comparative Politics (with Distinction) in 2010.

== Political career ==
Ossinovski was the Minister of Education and Research from 26 March 2014 to 9 April 2015. Since 14 September 2015 he is the Minister of Health and Labor.

In March 2017, Ossinovski chaired the first ever gathering of the Party of European Socialists’ health ministers.

In April 2018, Ossinovski announced that he would step down as minister in order to focus on the party ahead of the 2019 parliamentary election. On 2 May 2018, his cabinet position was passed to Riina Sikkut. After the Social Democratic Party suffered a loss in the election and was left in the opposition, Ossinovski announced that he would stand down as the leader of the party.

== See also ==
- List of mayors of Tallinn

Party political offices
Preceded by Sven Mikser	Leader of the Social Democratic Party; 2015–2019	Succeeded by Indrek Saar
