= Mihhail Kõlvart =

Estonian politician (born 1977)

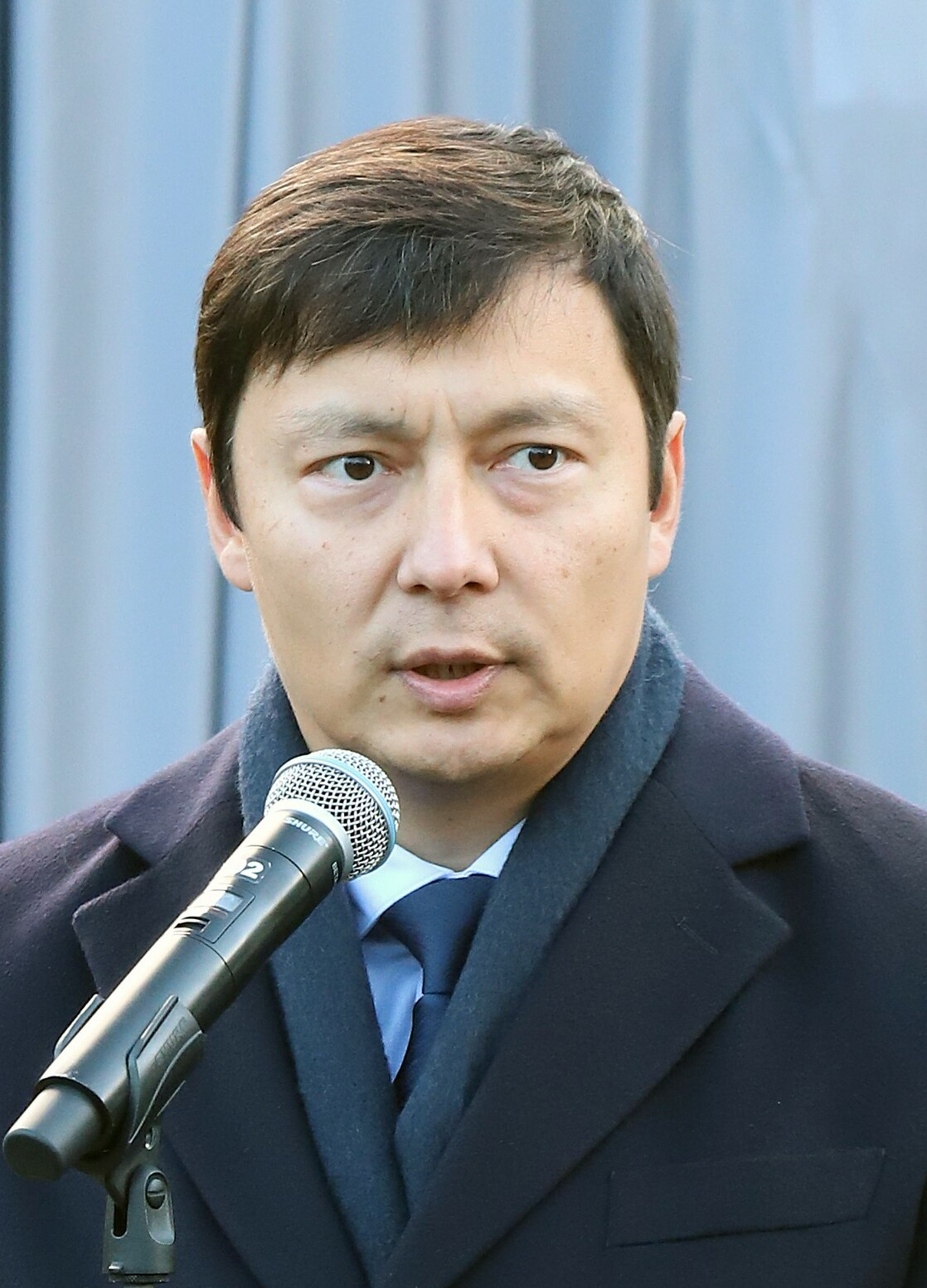
- Kõlvart in 2023

Leader of the Centre Party
- Incumbent
- Assumed office 10 September 2023
- Preceded by: Jüri Ratas

Mayor of Tallinn
- In office 11 April 2019 – 26 March 2024
- Preceded by: Taavi Aas
- Succeeded by: Jevgeni Ossinovski

President of the Municipal Council of Tallinn
- In office 3 November 2017 – 10 April 2019
- Preceded by: Kalev Kallo
- Succeeded by: Tiit Terik

Personal details
- Born: 24 November 1977 (age 48) Kyzylorda, Kazakh SSR, Soviet Union
- Citizenship: Estonia
- Party: Centre Party (2009–present)
- Other political affiliations: Social Democratic Party (1998–2009)
- Spouse: Anastassia Kovalenko (m. 2022)
- Children: 1
- Profession: Politician

Mihhail Kõlvart (born 24 November 1977) is an Estonian politician currently serving as the leader of the Centre Party since 2023. He served as the mayor of Tallinn, Estonia from April 2019, after the resignation of Taavi Aas, until the passing of a non-confidence motion on 26 March 2024.

== Early life ==
Kõlvart was born in Kyzylorda, Kazakh SSR, to an Estonian father, Ülo Kõlvart, and Liidia Kõlvart (née Shek), who was of Chinese and Korean ancestry. The couple met while they were both studying at Moscow State University. His father is the founder of the Estonian National Taekwondo Association in 1992 and was its first president from 1992 to 1996. His mother was a teacher. He moved with his parents to Estonia when he was three years old. Kõlvart has a daughter with Jaana Kalinistova.

He graduated from Tallinn Secondary School No. 15 in 1995. He studied jurisprudence and later business law at the International College of Applied Social Sciences LEX in Tallinn.

== Athletic career ==
Kõlvart made a name for himself as a top athlete nationally and internationally in the disciplines of boxing, kickboxing and Taekwondo, of which he has a black belt in (5th dan). Starting in 1993, he worked in Tallinn as a Taekwondo coach. In 1996, he was elected President of the Estonian National Taekwondo Association. In 2016, he became a member of the executive committee of the Estonian Olympic Committee. In 2017 was elected as a president of Estonian Taekwondo Federation. In 2022 obtained an honorary 7 dan from Kukkiwon.

== Political career ==
From 1999 to 2002, Kõlvart was a member of the district council of the Lasnamäe district of Tallinn. In 2008, he joined the Estonian Centre Party. In 2009, he was elected to the Tallinn city council. He was particularly committed to youth and sport and the rights of ethnic minorities in Tallinn, and as such, has made him popular with the Russian-speaking minority of Tallinn.

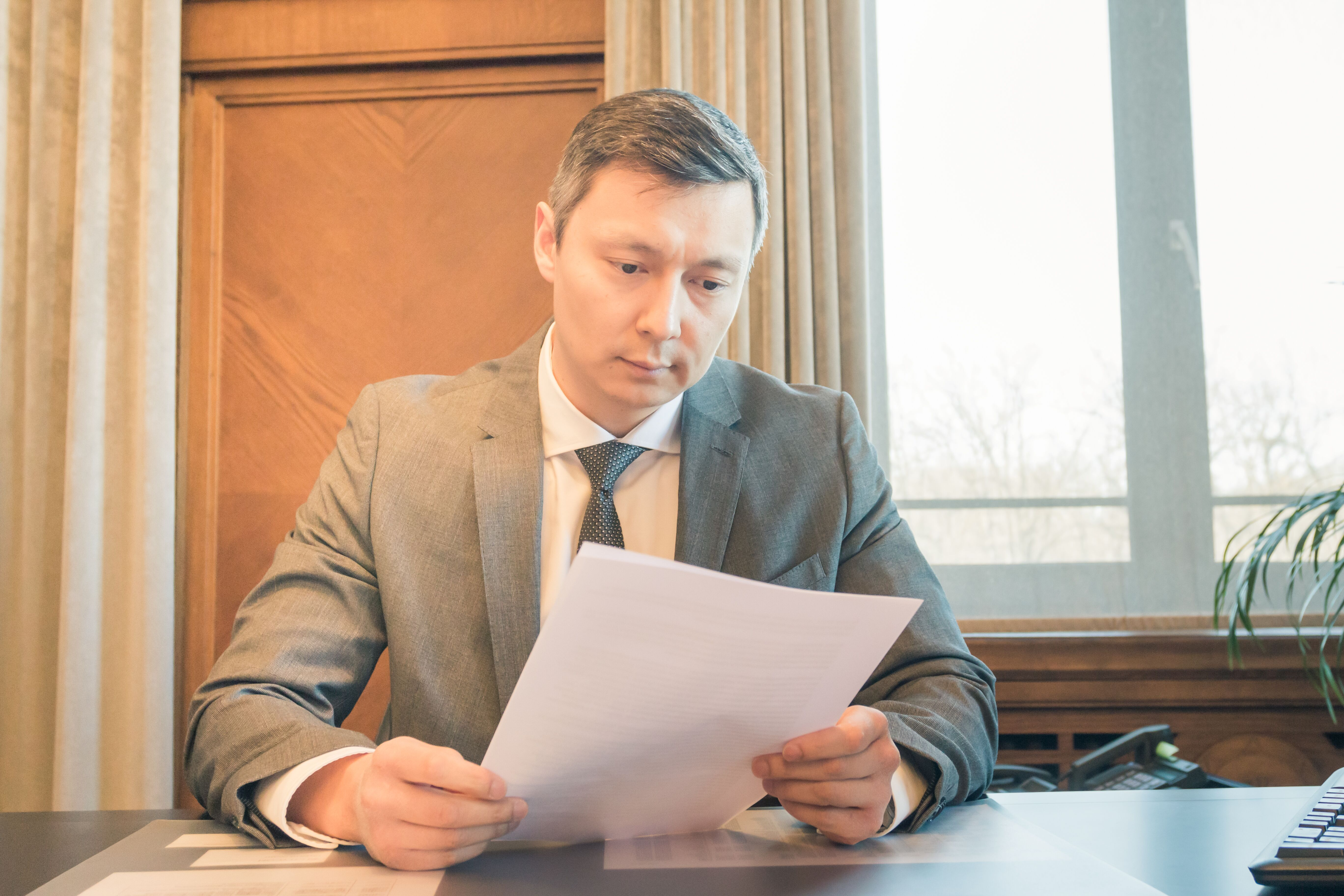
Kõlvart in 2020

He was elected to the Riigikogu in 2011, of which he was a member of until 2019. In April 2011, he resigned as a deputy mayor of Tallinn to serve in the Riigikogu. Later on, from 2017 to 2019, he was the chairman of the Tallinn City Council. He resigned in April 2019, as he was elected mayor of Tallinn on 11 April after the resignation of mayor Taavi Aas to serve in the cabinet of Jüri Ratas. On 30 September 2019, he was made an honorary citizen of Seoul, South Korea by Seoul's mayor Park Won-soon, and in April 2022 he was awarded an honorary doctorate from Shinhan University.

On 10 September 2023, Kõlvart was elected leader of the Estonian Centre Party at a special party conference in Paide. He received 543 votes (51.91%), defeating Tanel Kiik who received 489 votes (46.75%).

On 26 March 2024, Kõlvart was removed from the office of mayor after the Social Democrats joined the opposition in the Tallinn City Council in voting for the motion of no confidence in him.
