= Riina Sikkut =

Estonian politician (born 1983)

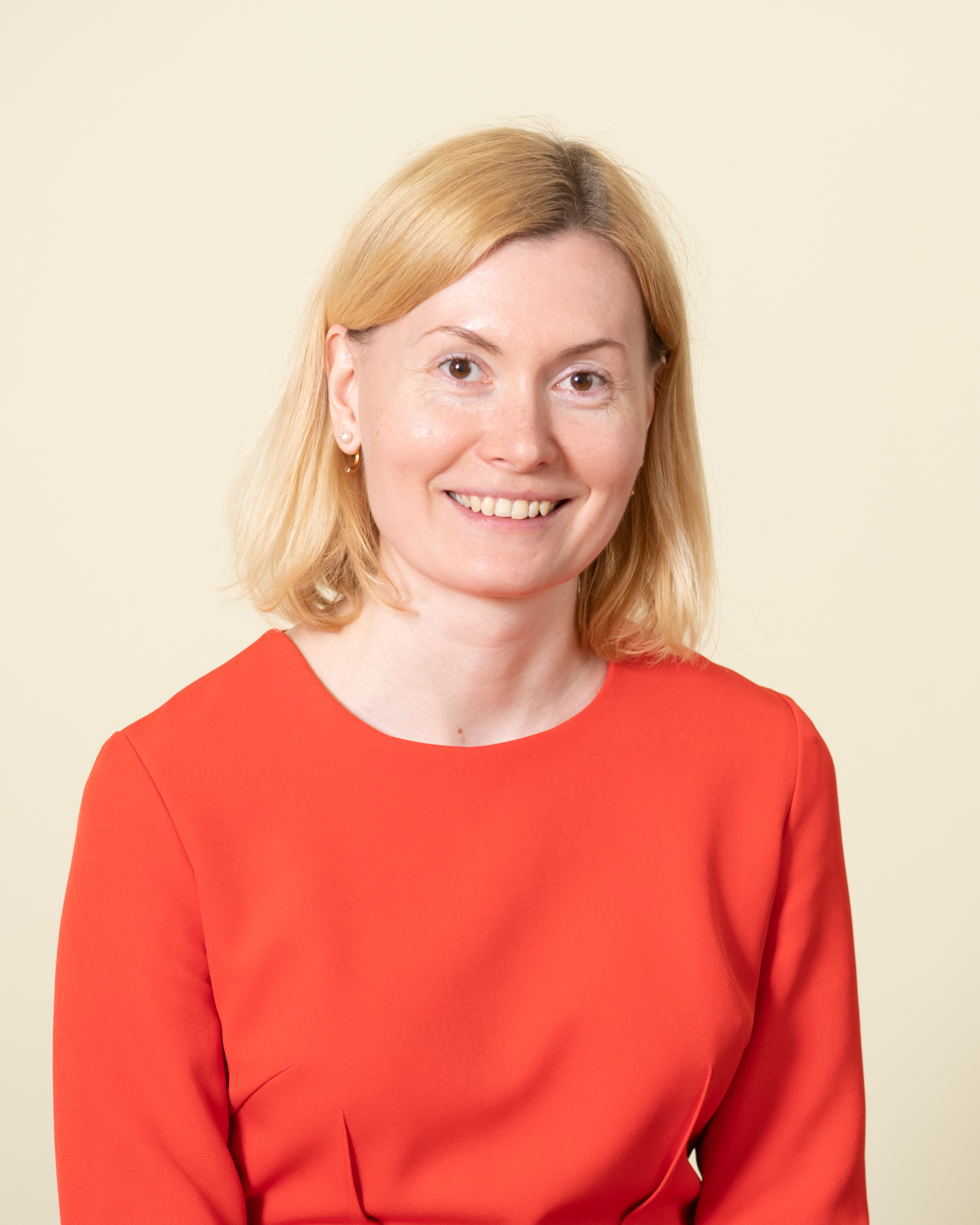
- Sikkut in 2019

Minister of Health
- In office 17 April 2023 – 11 March 2025
- Prime Minister: Kaja Kallas; Kristen Michal
- Preceded by: Peep Peterson
- Succeeded by: Signe Riisalo (acting)

Minister of Economic Affairs and Infrastructure
- In office 18 July 2022 – 17 April 2023
- Prime Minister: Kaja Kallas
- Preceded by: Taavi Aas
- Succeeded by: Tiit Riisalo

Minister of Health and Labour
- In office 2 May 2018 – 29 April 2019
- Prime Minister: Jüri Ratas
- Preceded by: Jevgeni Ossinovski
- Succeeded by: Tanel Kiik (as Minister of Social Affairs)

Personal details
- Born: 12 January 1983 (age 43)
- Party: Social Democratic Party
- Education: University of Tartu; University of London

Riina Sikkut (born 12 January 1983) is an Estonian politician of the Social Democratic Party of Estonia, member of two national parliament Riigikogu legislatures and longest-serving Minister of Health in the Government of Estonia after Restoration of Independence in 1991.

She served as Minister of Health and Labour in Jüri Ratas' first cabinet in 2018-2019. She was sworn in on 2 May 2018, after the former minister Jevgeni Ossinovski had vacated the seat, and left the office on 29 April 2019. She later served as Minister of Economic Affairs and Infrastructure in the second cabinet of Prime Minister Kaja Kallas 2022-2023.

Sikkut was sworn in as Minister of Health in the third cabinet of Kaja Kallas on 17 April 2023 and served until 11 March 2025. After the Social Democratic Party was removed from government by its coalition partners, she was succeeded by Karmen Joller.

Sikkut holds Bachelor’s Degree from the University of Tartu in 2005 in macroeconomics. In 2010, she graduated with a Master’s degree in health policy from the London School of Hygiene Tropical Medicine / London School of Economics joint programme under the University of London.
