= Peep Peterson =

Estonian politician (born 1975)

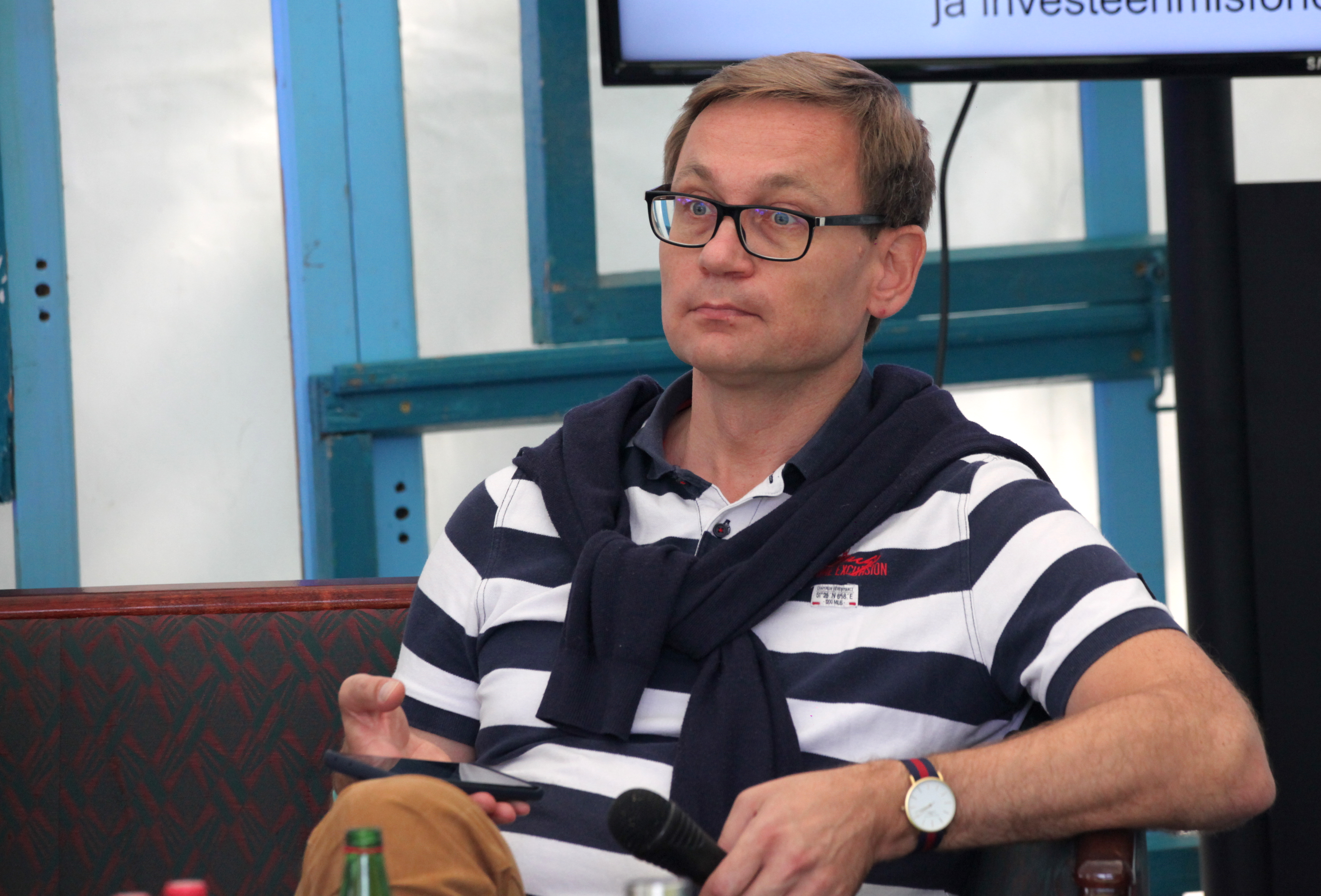
- Peterson in 2021

Minister of Health and Labour
- In office 18 July 2022 – 17 April 2023
- Prime Minister: Kaja Kallas
- Preceded by: Tanel Kiik
- Succeeded by: Riina Sikkut as Minister of Health

Personal details
- Born: 29 March 1975 (age 51) Tartu, Estonia
- Party: Social Democratic Party
- Education: Tallinn School of Economics

Peep Peterson (born 29 March 1975) is an Estonian politician. He served as Minister of Health and Labour in the second cabinet of Prime Minister Kaja Kallas from 2022-2023.
