= Karmen Joller =

Estonian medical doctor and politician

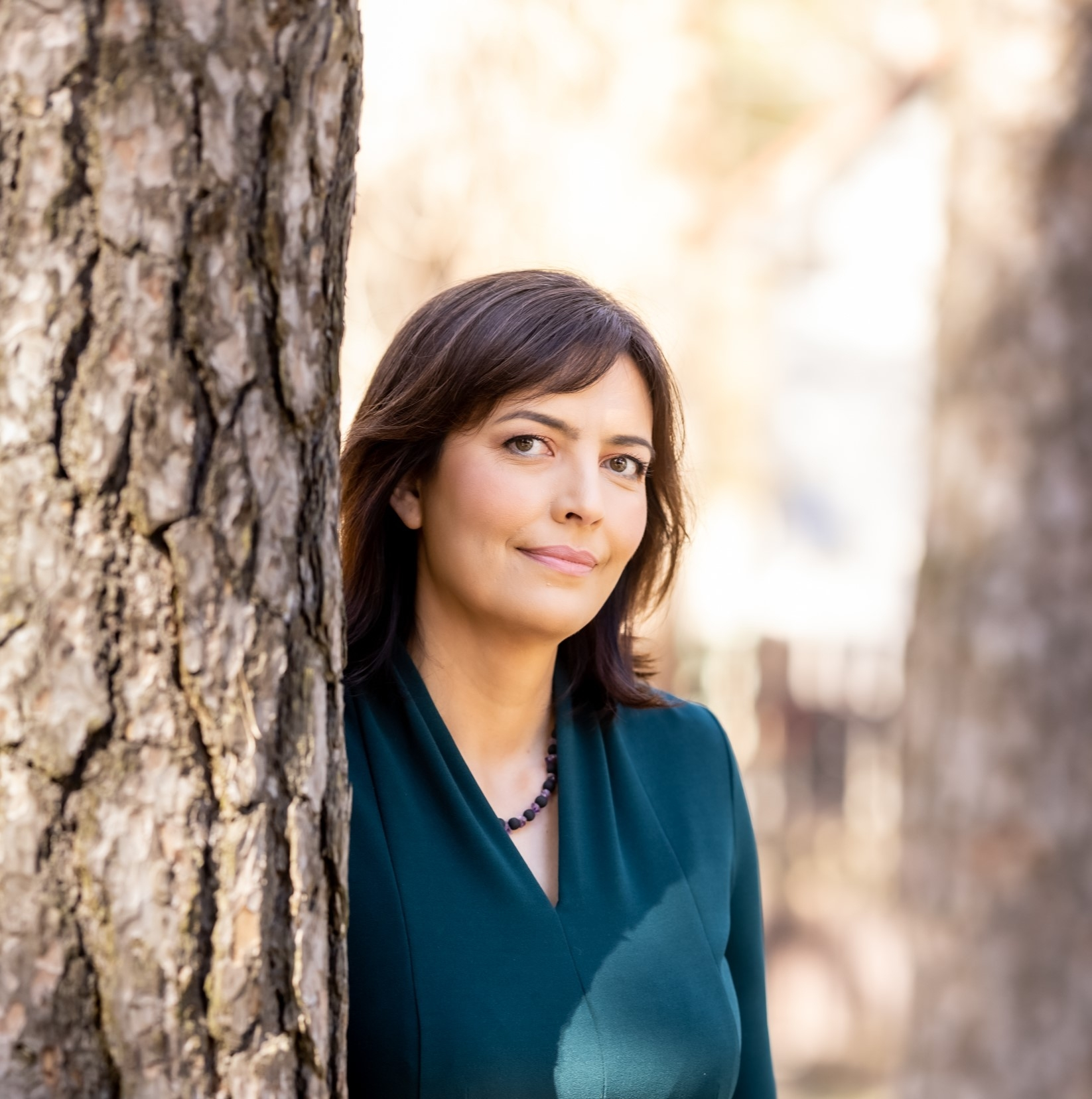

Minister of Social Affairs
- Incumbent
- Assumed office 25 April 2025
- Preceded by: Riina Sikkut as Minister of Health

Member of the Riigikogu
- In office 2023–2025

Personal details
- Born: Karmen Palts; 3 January 1976 (age 50) Rakvere, then part of Estonian SSR, Soviet Union
- Party: Estonian Reform Party
- Children: 2
- Occupation: Politician, doctor

Karmen Joller (née Palts; born 3 January 1976) is an Estonian family doctor and politician. A member of the Reform Party, currently serves as the Minister of Social Affairs of Estonia.

In 2019 and 2020, Eesti Päevaleht (Estonian Daily) included Joller in the list of the most influential people in Estonia.

== Biography ==
Joller graduated from the University of Tartu Faculty of Medicine in 2001 and completed her residency in family medicine in 2005.

Joller has worked as a family doctor at various healthcare centres, including OÜ Meditiim from 2005 to 2006, and Telliskivi Perearstikeskus from 2006 to 2016. Since 2016, she has been a family doctor at Kivimäe Perearstikeskus. She is also a member of the Estonian Society of Family Doctors.

Additionally, from 2016 onwards, Joller has been a lecturer at the University of Tartu.

=== Political career ===
On 23 November 2022, Karmen Joller joined the Estonian Reform Party.

Joller ran for the Riigikogu in the 2023 elections and received 3,564 votes in the electoral district number 2 (Tallinn Central, Lasnamäe, and Pirita districts), securing her election.

In April 2025, after the Social Democratic Party was sacked from Kristen Michal's coalition government, she succeeded Riina Sikkut as the Minister of Social Affairs.

== Personal life ==
Joller has been married to Jüri Joller since August 2011, and they have two sons. The Joller family has also raised the children of Karmen's late sister.

In her free time, Joller engages in activities such as music, handicrafts, reading, and horseback riding. Additionally, she is one of the founders of the NGO Nõmme Abikäsi, which helps Ukrainian refugees. She collects and processes wool, which volunteers use to knit woollen items for sending to the front lines.
