= Signe Riisalo =

Estonian politician (born 1968)

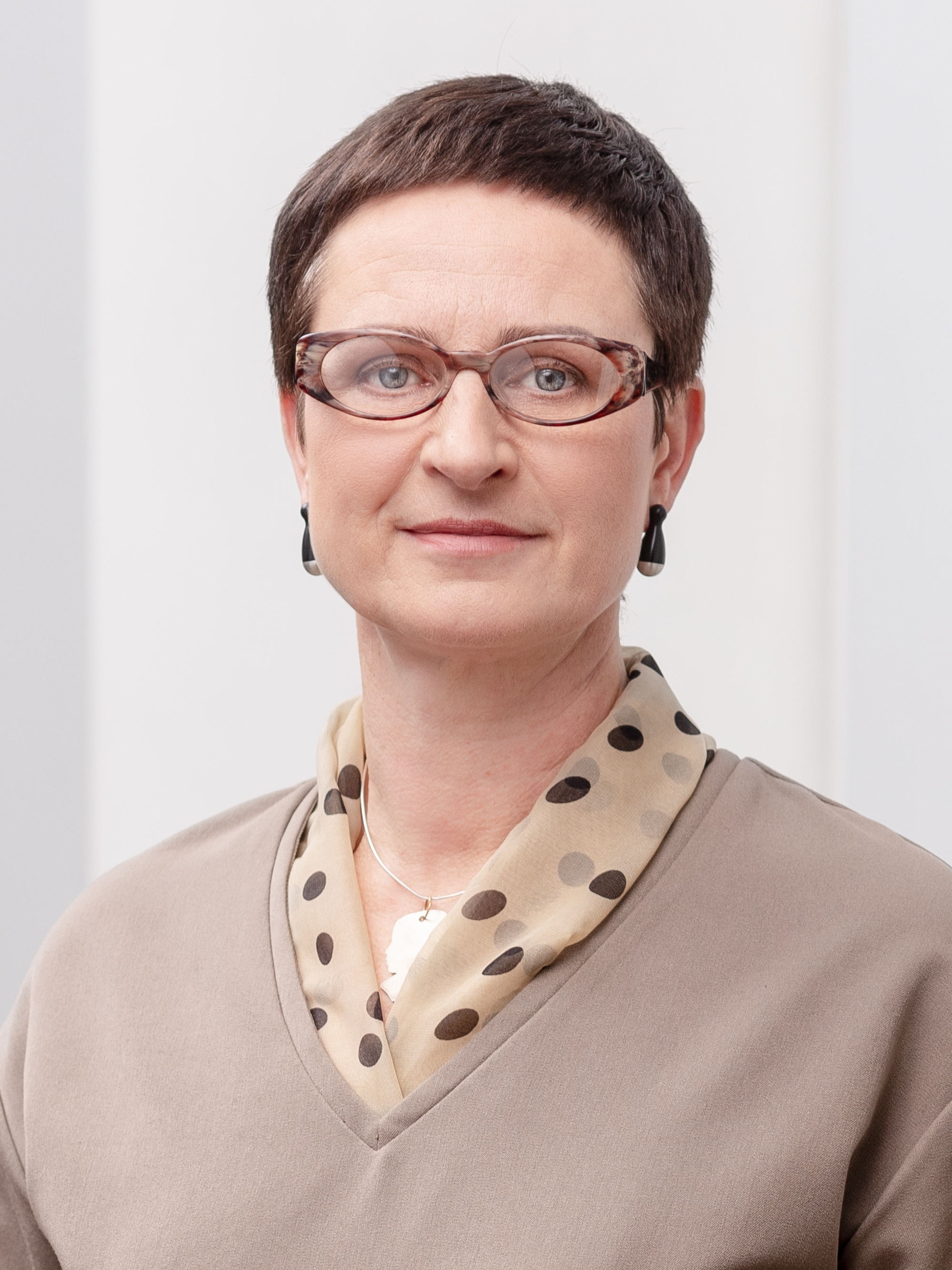
- Riisalo in 2021

Minister of Social Protection
- In office 26 January 2021 – 25 March 2025
- Prime Minister: Kaja Kallas; Kristen Michal
- Preceded by: Tanel Kiik (as Minister of Social Affairs)
- Succeeded by: Karmen Joller (as Minister of Social Affairs)

Personal details
- Born: 8 October 1968 (age 57) Tallinn, Estonia
- Party: Reform Party
- Education: Tallinn University; University of Tartu

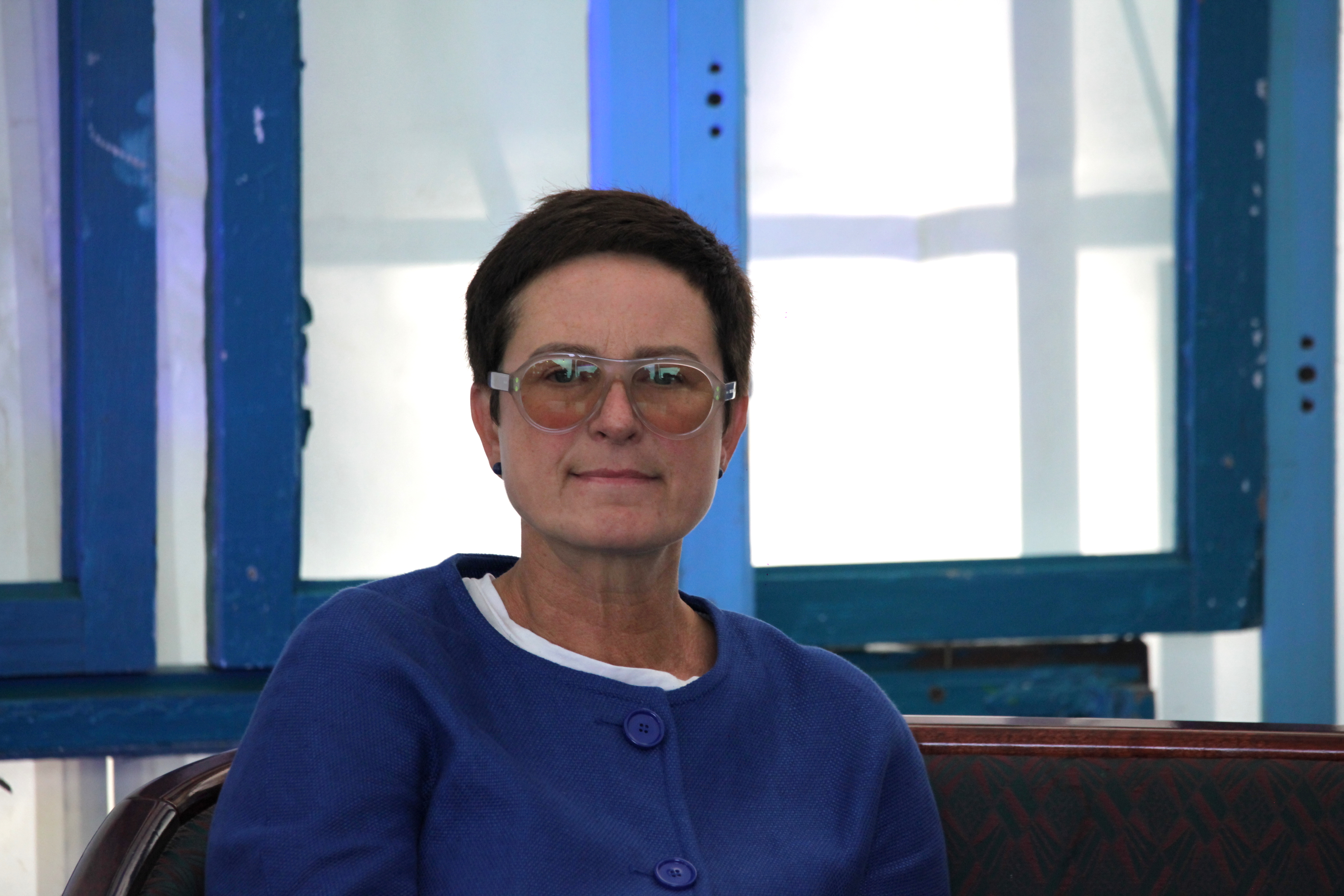
Signe Riisalo at the Opinion Festival 2021 in Paide, Estonia

Signe Riisalo (born 8 October 1968) is an Estonian politician. As of 26 January 2021, she serves as Minister of Social Protection in the cabinet of Prime Minister Kaja Kallas. She is affiliated with the Reform Party.

Political offices
Preceded by Tanel Kiik as Minister of Social Affairs	Minister of Social Protection; 2021–present	Incumbent
