= Ministry of Social Affairs (Estonia) =

Government ministry of Estonia

Agency overview
- Jurisdiction: Government of Estonia
- Headquarters: Suur-Ameerika 1, 10122 Tallinn, Estonia
- Annual budget: €7.92 billion (2023)
- Minister responsible: Karmen Joller, Minister of Social Affairs
- Child agencies: Estonian Social Insurance Board; Estonian Health Board; Labour Inspectorate of Estonia; State Agency of Medicines; National Institute for Health Development; Astangu Vocational Rehabilitation Centre; Health and Welfare Information Systems Centre
- Website: http://www.sm.ee/en/

The Ministry of Social Affairs of Estonia (Estonian: Eesti Sotsiaalministeerium) is a government ministry of Estonia responsible for social policies of the country.

The Ministry was formed on 1 February 1993, when three earlier ministries were merged. These three ministries were Ministry of Health (Estonian: Tervishoiuministeerium), Ministry of Social Care (Estonian: Sotsiaalhooldusministeerium) and Ministry of Labor (Estonian: Tööministeerium).

== List of ministers ==
The position first appeared in the government of Mart Laar established in 1992. In 2014, the responsibilities of the Minister of Social Affairs were divided between the two newly established positions of Minister of Social Protection and Minister of Health. Since then, over time, the responsibilities have been merged and divided again. Currently, the minister responsible for Social Affairs since 2025 is Karmen Joller.

=== Social affairs (1992–2014) ===
- 22 October 1992 – 20 September 1994 Marju Lauristin.
- 20 September 1994 – 1 May 1995 Toomas Vilosius.
- 17 April 1995 – 20 November 1995 Siiri Oviir.
- 6 November 1995 – 1 December 1996 Toomas Vilosius.
- 2 December 1996 – 25 March 1999 Tiiu Aro.
- 25 March 1999 – 28 January 2002 Eiki Nestor.
- 28 January 2002 – 9 April 2003 Siiri Oviir.
- 10 April 2003 – 13 April 2005 Marko Pomerants.
- 13 April 2005 – 5 April 2007 Jaak Aab.
- 5 April 2007 – 23 February 2009 Maret Maripuu.
- 23 February 2009 – 10 December 2012 Hanno Pevkur.
- 11 December 2012 – 26 March 2014 Taavi Rõivas

=== Social protection (2014–2019) ===
- 26 March 2014 – 30 March 2015 Helmen Kütt
- 9 April 2015 – 23 November 2016 Margus Tsahkna
- 23 November 2016 – 29 April 2019 Kaia Iva

=== Health and labour (2014–2019) ===
- 26 March 2014 – 30 March 2015 Urmas Kruuse
- 9 April 2015 – 14 September 2015 Rannar Vassiljev
- 14 September 2015 – 2 May 2018 Jevgeni Ossinovski
- 2 May 2018 – 29 April 2019 Riina Sikkut

=== Social affairs (2019–2021) ===
- 29 April 2019 – 26 January 2021 Tanel Kiik

=== Health and labour (2021–2023) ===
- 26 January 2021 – 3 June 2022 Tanel Kiik
- 18 July 2022 – 17 April 2023 Peep Peterson

=== Health (2023–2025) ===
- 17 April 2023 – 11 March 2025 Riina Sikkut

=== Social protection (2021–2025) ===
- 26 January 2021 – 25 March 2025 Signe Riisalo

=== Social affairs (2025–) ===
- 25 March 2025 – present Karmen Joller
