= Rannar Vassiljev =

Estonian politician (born 1981)

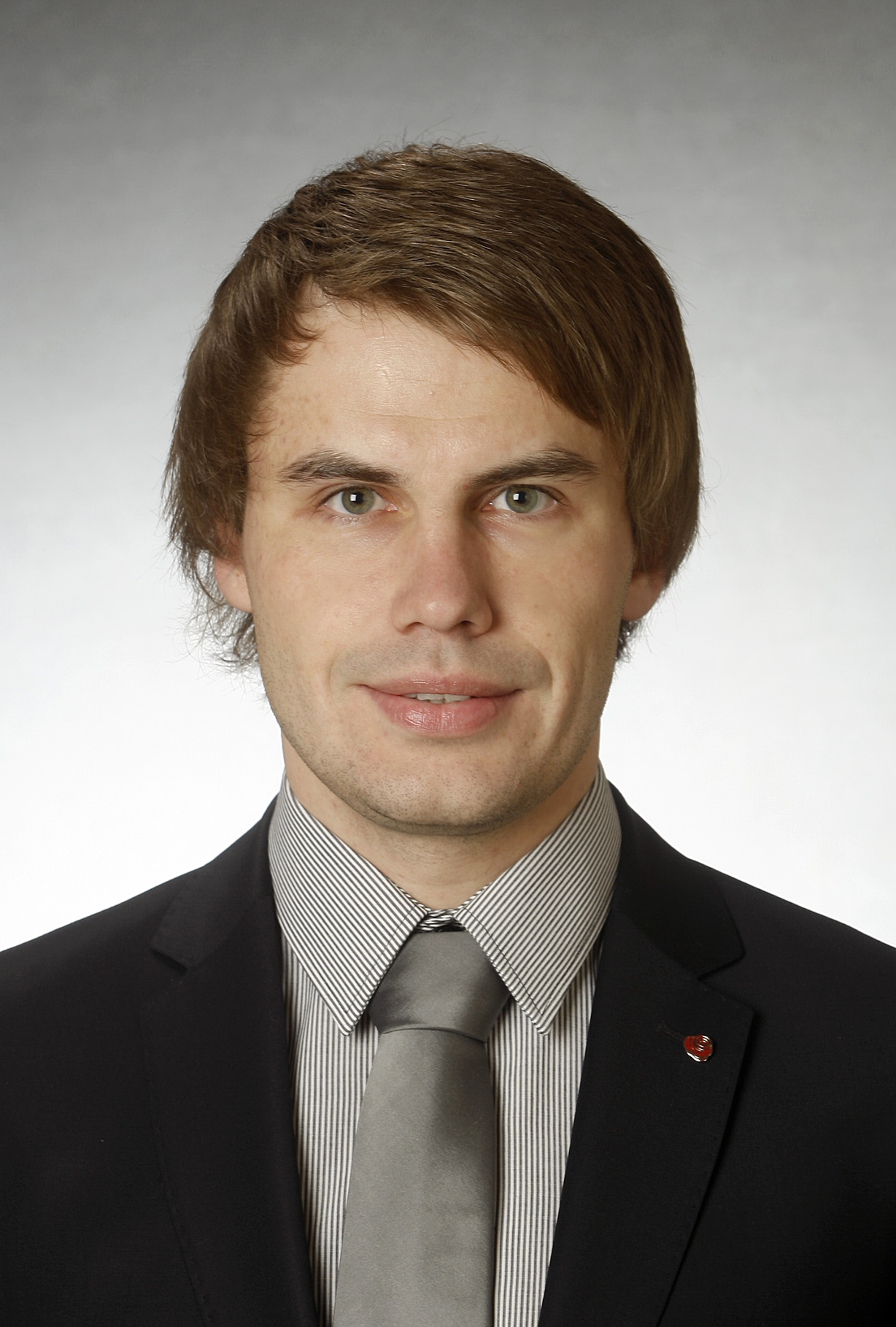
Rannar Vassiljev in 2011

Rannar Vassiljev (born 8 November 1981 in Rakvere) is an Estonian politician. He has been a member of the XII Riigikogu. In 2015 he was Minister of Health and Labour.

Rannar Vassiljev graduated from Rakvere Gymnasium in 2000 and from the University of Tartu in 2004 with a degree in political science. From 2005 to 2009 he worked as the Deputy Mayor of Rakvere and from 2009 to 2010 as the Mayor of Rakvere. He is a member of the Estonian Social Democratic Party.
