= Tanel Kiik =

Estonian politician (born 1989)

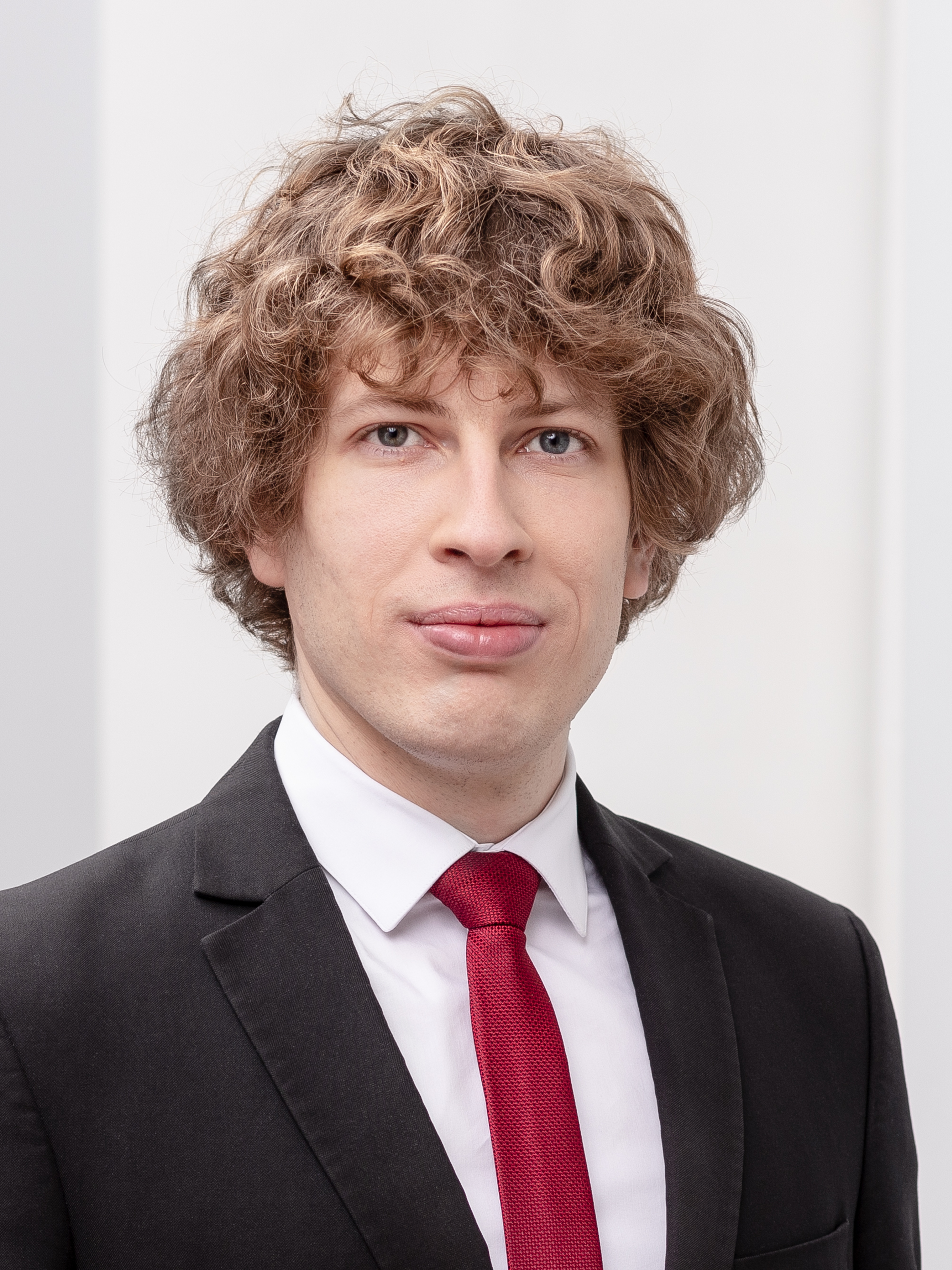
- Tanel Kiik in 2021

Minister of Health and Labour
- In office 26 January 2021 – 3 June 2022
- Prime Minister: Kaja Kallas
- Preceded by: Himself as Minister of Social Affairs
- Succeeded by: Peep Peterson

Minister of Social Affairs
- In office 29 April 2019 – 26 January 2021
- Prime Minister: Jüri Ratas
- Preceded by: Riina Sikkut (as Minister of Health and Labour)
- Succeeded by: Office split into Minister of Health and Labour and Minister of Social Protection

Member of the Riigikogu
- Incumbent
- Assumed office 10 April 2023

Deputy Mayor of Tallinn
- In office 9 September 2022 – 9 April 2023

Personal details
- Born: 23 January 1989 (age 37) Tallinn, then part of Estonian SSR, Soviet Union
- Party: Estonian Social Democratic Party (2024–present)
- Other political affiliations: Centre Party (2018–2024)
- Children: 2
- Education: University of Tartu

Tanel Kiik (born 23 January 1989) is an Estonian politician and former cabinet minister. After being an advisor, Kiik was Minister of Social Affairs from 2019 to 2021. In the government of Kaja Kallas, he became Minister of Health and Labour from 2021 to 2022, and was then Deputy Mayor of Tallinn. In 2023, he became a member of the Riigikogu but left the Centre Party in 2024 for the Estonian Social Democratic Party.

== Early and personal life ==
Kiik was born on 23 January 1989. He is the son of art historian Helena Risthein and organist and organ maintainer Tiit Kiik. His grandfather is Endel Risthein, professor emeritus at Tallinn University of Technology, electrical engineer.

Kiik speaks Estonian, English, and German. He is married to Marii Kiik, and together they have two children. One daughter, Evita, was born in 2018, and they had a son named Lukas Tobias in 2025.

== Political career ==
From 2012–2016, Tanel Kiik was an advisor to Jüri Ratas in the Riigikogu and ifrom 2016–2019, he was the head of Prime Minister Jüri Ratas's office in the State Chancellery.

He served as Minister of Social Affairs in the second cabinet of Jüri Ratas.

In the cabinet of Kaja Kallas, his office was split into Minister of Health and Labour and Minister of Social Protection. Kiik was appointed as Minister of Health and Labour and Signe Riisalo was appointed as Minister of Social Protection.

In 2023, Kiik ran to be leader of the Centre Party. He received 489 votes (46.75%) at the party's special conference in Paide, being defeated by Mihhail Kõlvart who won 543 votes (51.91%).

On 5 January 2024, Kiik and three other members (Ester Karuse, Jaak Aab and Andre Hanimägi) of the 15th Riigikogu announced their departure from the Centre Party and joined the Estonian Social Democratic Party.

Political offices
Preceded by Himself as Minister of Social Affairs	Minister of Health and Labour; 2021–2022	Succeeded by Peep Peterson
Preceded by Riina Sikkut as Minister of Health and Labour	Minister of Social Affairs; 2019–2021	Office split into Minister of Health and Labour and Minister of Social Protection
