= Estonian Centre Party =

Political party in Estonia

Estonian Centre Party Eesti Keskerakond
- Leader: Mihhail Kõlvart
- Founder: Edgar Savisaar
- Founded: 12 October 1991; 35 years ago
- Split from: Popular Front of Estonia
- Headquarters: Narva mnt. 31-M1, Tallinn 10120
- Newspaper: Kesknädal
- Youth wing: Estonian Centre Party Youth
- Membership (2024): ▼12,308
- Ideology: Populism; Conservatism (Note: Pundits and experts previously noted that the party had a conservative wing and a liberal wing, heavily highlighted amidst the 2023 leadership election between Mihhail Kõlvart and Tanel Kiik. However, after Kõlvart's victory and the exodus of many liberal members from the party, Kõlvart stated "Originally, the Centre Party is more of a centre-conservative party. Political scientists have also observed this. Our messages have become more specific and conservative." The party has also been described as left-conservative.); Left-conservatism
- Political position: Economic: Centre-left; Social: Centre-right
- European affiliation: None (since 2024) (Note: The party was formerly part of the ALDE Party (2004–2024).)
- European Parliament group: Renew Europe and European Conservatives and Reformists (Note: Jana Toom sits with Renew Europe, and Jaak Madison sits with the ECR Group)
- Colours: Green
- Riigikogu: 8 / 101
- European Parliament: 2 / 7
- Municipalities: 198 / 1,688

Party flag

Website
- keskerakond.ee

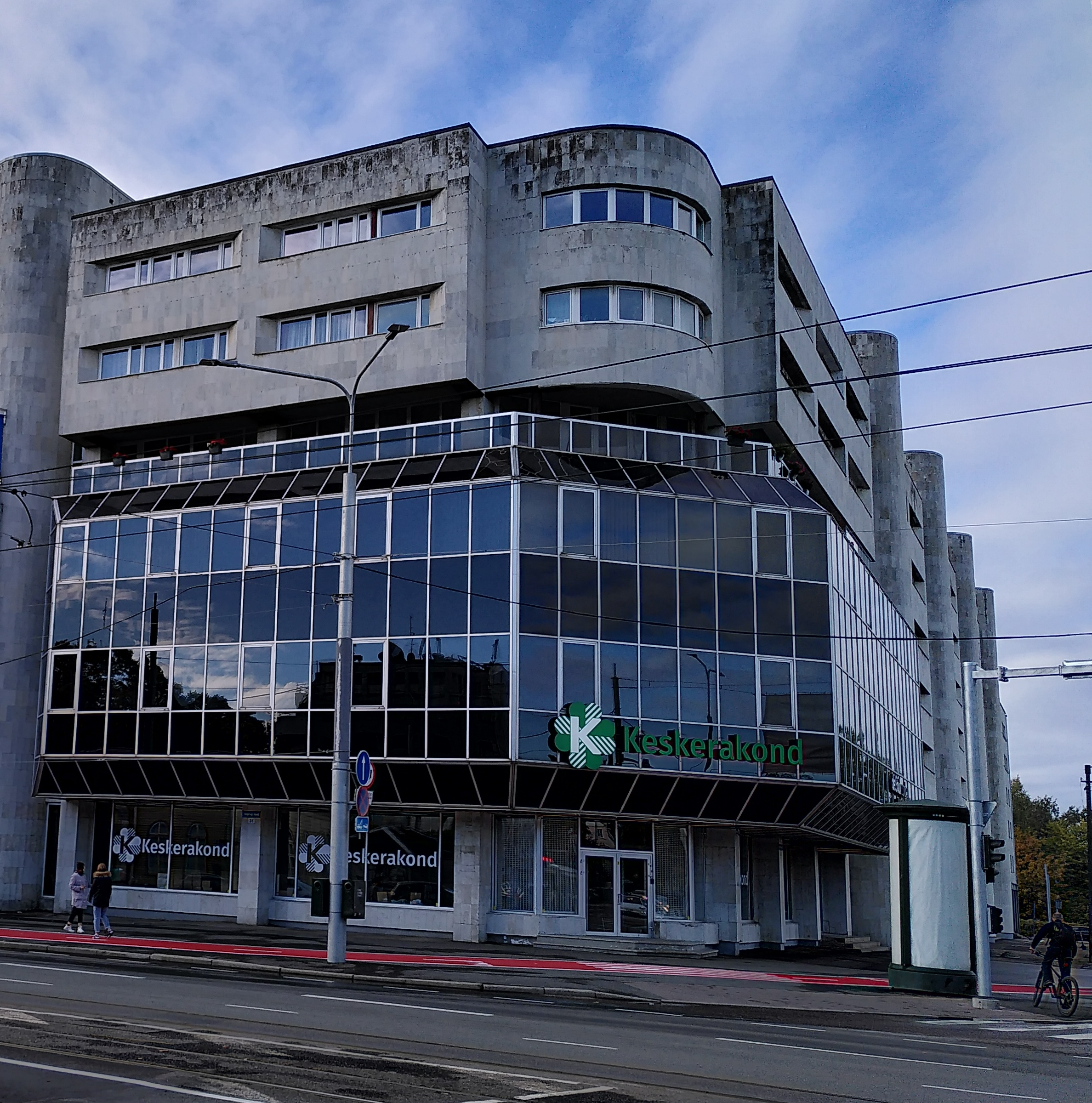
Headquarters of the Estonian Centre Party in Tallinn

The Estonian Centre Party (Estonian: Eesti Keskerakond, KE) is a populist political party in Estonia. It was founded in 1991 as a direct successor of the Popular Front of Estonia, and it is currently led by Mihhail Kõlvart. The party was founded on 12 October 1991 from the basis of the Popular Front of Estonia after several parties split from it. At that time, the party was called the People's Centre Party (Rahvakeskerakond) to differentiate from the smaller centre-right Rural Centre Party (Maa-Keskerakond). The party was a member of the Alliance of Liberals and Democrats for Europe until 14 September 2024. On 14 March 2026, the party voted to begin negotiations to join the European Conservatives and Reformists Party.

== History ==
In the parliamentary elections of March 1995, the Centre Party was placed third with 14.2% of votes and 16 seats. It entered the coalition, Edgar Savisaar taking the position of the Minister of Internal Affairs, and four other ministerial positions (Social Affairs, Economy, Education and Transportation & Communications). After the "tape scandal" (secret taping of talks with other politicians) in which Savisaar was involved, the party was forced to go to opposition. A new party was formed by those who were disappointed by their leader's behaviour. Savisaar became the Chairman of the City Council of the capital city Tallinn. In 1996, Siiri Oviir ran for the presidency of Estonia. In the parliamentary elections of March 1999, the Centre Party, whose main slogan was progressive income tax, gained 23.4% of votes (the first result) and 28 seats in the Riigikogu. Party members are active in its 26 branches – eight of them are active in Tallinn, 18 in towns and counties. The Centre Party became a member of the Alliance of Liberals and Democrats for Europe Party (then known as the European Liberal Democrat and Reform Party) at the organisation's July 2003 London Congress. The party also applied for the membership of the Liberal International (LI) in 2001, but the LI decided to reject the party's application in August 2001, as Savisaar's conduct was adjudged to "not always conform to liberal principles".

In 2001, Kreitzberg unsuccessfully ran for the presidency of Estonia. Savisaar was the Mayor of Tallinn, the capital of Estonia, from 2001 to fall 2004, when he was forced to step down after a vote of no confidence. He was replaced by Tõnis Palts of Res Publica. In January 2002, the Centre Party and the Estonian Reform Party formed a new governmental coalition where Centre Party got 8 ministerial seats (Minister of Defense, Education, Social Affairs, Finances, Economy & Communications, Interior, Agriculture and Minister of integration and national minorities). The coalition stayed until the new elections in 2003, in which the party won 28 seats. Though the Centre Party won the greatest per cent of votes, it was in opposition until March 2005 when Juhan Parts' government collapsed. In 2003, the majority of the party's assembly did not support Estonia's joining the European Union (EU). Savisaar did not express clearly his position. A number of Centre Party members exited the party in autumn 2004, mostly due to objections with Savisaar's autocratic tendencies and the party's EU-sceptic stance, forming the Social Liberal group. Some of them joined the Social Democratic Party, others the Reform Party and others the People's Party. One of these MPs later rejoined the Centre Party. Since Estonia's accession to the EU, the party has largely revised its formerly EU-sceptic positions.

In 2004, the Centre Party gained one member in the European Parliament – Siiri Oviir. The Centre Party gathered 17.5% share of votes on the elections to the European Parliament. Oviir joined the Alliance of Liberals and Democrats for Europe (ALDE) Group. The Centre Party participated in government with the Estonian Reform Party and the People's Union of Estonia from 12 April 2005 until a new government took office after the March 2007 elections. The Centre Party had five minister portfolios (Edgar Savisaar as Minister of Economy, also Minister of Social Affairs, Education, Culture and Interior). Local elections on 16 October 2005 were very successful to the Centre Party. It managed to win 32 seats out of 63 in Tallinn City Council, having now an absolute majority in that municipality. One of the factors behind this success in Tallinn was probably the immense popularity of Centre Party among Russian speaking voters. The controversial contract of co-operation between the Estonian Centre Party and the Russia's dominant political party of power United Russia has probably contributed to the success in ethnic Russian electorate as well.

The Centre Party formed a one-party administration in the City of Tallinn led by Jüri Ratas, a 27-year-old politician elected the Mayor of Tallinn in November 2005. He was replaced by Savisaar in April 2007. The Centre Party is also a member of coalitions in 15 other major towns of Estonia like Pärnu, Narva, Haapsalu and Tartu. In the 2007 Estonian parliamentary election, the party received 143,528 votes (26.1% of the total), an improvement of +0.7%. They took 29 seats, a gain of one seat compared to the 2003 elections, though due to the 2004 defections which had decreased their strength, they actually gained 10 seats. They are now the second largest party in Parliament and the largest opposition party. In 2008, the party criticised Andrus Ansip's policies, that in Centre Party's opinion have contributed to Estonia's economic problems of recent times. On 16 June 2007, Edgar Savisaar and Jaan Õmblus published a proposal of how to improve what they regard as Estonia's economic crisis.

In the European Parliament elections of 2009, the Centre Party gained the most votes and 2 out of 6 Estonian seats, which were filled by Siiri Oviir and Vilja Savisaar. In local elections of 2009, the party strengthened its absolute majority in the Tallinn city council. Despite their absolute majority, they formed a coalition with the Social Democratic Party. Recent polls suggest the party is especially popular amongst Estonia's Russophone minority. On 9 April 2012, eight prominent Centre Party members decided to leave the party citing frustration of their attempts to bring openness and transparency into party leadership. Previously MP Kalle Laanet was expelled on 21 March for his criticism of the party leadership. The leaving politicians included MEPs Siiri Oviir and Vilja Savisaar-Toomast, MPs Inara Luigas, Lembit Kaljuvee, Deniss Boroditš and Rainer Vakra, and also Ain Seppik, Toomas Varek. In the local elections of 20 October 2013, the Center Party and its leader Edgar Savisaar were successful, obtaining the absolute majority in the city of Tallinn with 53% of votes, winning 46 seats out of 79 (2 more than the 2009 results), considerably more than the second party, the Pro Patria and Res Publica Union, which received 19% of votes and 16 seats.

The Estonian Centre Party obtained a good result in the 2015 election, obtaining 24.8% of votes and electing 27 MPs. The party remained in opposition to the new government of Taavi Rõivas, which was supported by the Estonian Reform Party, the Social Democratic Party and the Pro Patria and Res Publica Union. In Autumn 2016, Savisaar stepped down as party leader and Jüri Ratas was elected in his place. In November 2016, the Social Democratic Party and the Pro Patria Union withdrew from the government coalition and entered a no-confidence motion against the government, together with the Estonian Centre Party. On 9 November 2016, the Riigikogu approved the motion with a 63–28 vote and Rõivas was forced to resign; in a following coalition talk, the Centre Party, SDE and IRL formed a new coalition led by Center Party's chairman Jüri Ratas. The new government was sworn in on 23 November.

=== Parliamentary elections of 2019 ===
In the 2019 parliamentary election, the Centre Party lost support while the opposition Estonian Reform Party gained support and won a plurality in election. After the election, the head of the Centre Party, Jüri Ratas turned down an offer by the Reform Party for coalition talks and entered into talks with Isamaa and Conservative People's Party of Estonia (EKRE), the latter widely considered a far-right party. Ratas had previously ruled out forming a coalition with EKRE during the election campaign because of its hostile views. The inclusion of EKRE in coalition talks after the elections was met with local and international criticism. In a poll conducted after the start of the coalition talks, the party of Jüri Ratas further lost support.

The critics of the decision have claimed that Ratas is willing to sacrifice his party's values, the confidence of his voters and the stability and reputation of the country to keep his position as prime minister. Ratas has countered that his first duty is to look for ways to get his party included in the government to be able to work in the benefit of his voters and that the coalition would continue to firmly support the EU, NATO and would be sending out messages of tolerance.

Some key members and popular candidates of the party have been critical of the decision, with Raimond Kaljulaid leaving the board of the party in protest. Yana Toom, a member of the Centre Party and its representative in the European Parliament expressed criticism of the decision. Mihhail Kõlvart, popular among the Russian-speaking voters, has said the Centre Party cannot govern with EKRE's approach. On 5 April 2019, Raimond Kaljulaid announced his decision to quit the party, deciding to sit as an independent member of the Parliament.

==== Coalition government (2021–2022) ====
In January 2021, after the resignation of Jüri Ratas as Prime Minister, Kaja Kallas formed a Reform Party-led grand coalition government with the Estonian Centre Party. However, on 3 June 2022, Kallas dismissed the seven ministers affiliated with the Centre Party, governing as a minority government until a new coalition without the Centre Party was formed on 8 July.

=== In opposition (2022–present) ===
In the 2023 parliamentary election, the Centre Party received 15.3% of the vote and 16 seats in the Riigikogu. The party remained in opposition. Following a donation from businessman Parvel Pruunsild that split the party's board and led to a special congress, party leader Jüri Ratas announced his intention to not run for leadership again. Following the announcement, he endorsed Tanel Kiik as his successor while Tallinn mayor Mihhail Kõlvart declared his candidacy for leadership. Pundits speculated the election to be the most important in the party's history, with Kiik being perceived as representing the liberal and Estonian-speaking wing of the party while Kõlvart was seen as the representation of the conservative and Russian-speaking wing. Kõlvart won the leadership election with 543 votes against Kiik's 489, being elected the third leader in the party's history.

In September 2023, Kõlvart won the Centre Party's leadership election. His victory marked a significant change in the party's direction, choosing to focus more on its Russophone electoral base and shifting to socially conservative and economically syncretic positions, with the party becoming seen as one specifically of the niche Russian minority concentrated in the capital Tallinn and Ida-Viru County. As a result, in the following months the previous party leader Jüri Ratas and several other party members defected to other political forces, leaving Centre Party with one third of its initial parliamentary representation (down to only 6 MPs) and with an increasingly weaker position in the following opinion polls.

In August 2024, Jaak Madison, an MEP and former member of the Conservative People's Party of Estonia, joined the Centre Party. Madison rejected allegations that the party was pro-Russian and stated that he wished to reorient the party as a conservative people's party.

On 14 September 2024, the party withdrew from the Alliance of Liberals and Democrats for Europe Party, citing a policy divergence on issues of European integration between the Centre Party and ALDE.

On 14 March 2026, the Centre Party voted to apply for membership in the European Conservatives and Reformists Party.

== Ideology and platform ==
The Estonian Centre Party has been described as a social-liberal, or left-conservative, party that is in favour of the social market economy, and it has been also described as populist. Its political position has been described as either centrist, centre-left, or left-wing, since it combines left-wing populist elements and social liberalism.

This is despite the fact that the party holds positions considered contrary to social liberalism on a number of issues. For example, the party suggests that Estonia should deliberate re-establishing criminal punishments for the possession of even small amounts of illegal substances, and the Centre Party's parliamentary faction did not agree on its stance in regards to same-sex marriage, which is traditionally supported by social liberals. Party leader Jüri Ratas opposed same-sex marriage, while his preferred successor in the 2023 leadership election, Tanel Kiik, stated his support for it. Political scientist Martin Mölder labelled the party as left-conservative, adding that the party's voter base is "equally as conservative as Isamaa". It has also been described as left-conservative by political scientists Mari-Liis Jakobson, Josefina Sipinen and Kaarel Taimla. Former Prime Minister Andrus Ansip also pointed to the party's conservative voter base. The potential alliance of Isamaa, EKRE, and the Centre Party has often been labelled as the "conservative camp", "conservative wing", or "conservative alliance", while many experts regard the party as having a notable liberal and conservative wing, highlighted by the 2023 leadership election.

Historically, the party has been the most popular party among Russian-speaking citizens. In 2012, it was supported by up to 75% of ethnic non-Estonians.

=== Platform ===
The party says it promotes the protection of human rights; solidarity and tolerance; and freedom and pluralism. They advocate for a strong and well-functioning state, as well as evidence-based governance.

==== Economic Policy ====
The party claims that its goal is the formation of a strong middle class in Estonia. The Centre Party declares itself as a "middle class liberal party"; however, against the backdrop of Estonia's economically liberal policies, the Centre Party has a reputation of having more left-leaning policies. They promote keeping the minimum wage steady while trying to reduce economic inequality. They hope to accomplish this through targeted investment to regions with weaker economies, training and up-skilling workers, and tax system reform. The party mentions income redistribution and supporting social justice in the aims of its tax policy. The party also supports a progressive income tax.

In 2014, the party opened a city-run grocery store in Tallinn. The policy lasted until 2020, when the store was shut down and given to the Estonian food bank.

Additionally, they support the continued development of Rail Baltic. The party is responsible for having introduced fare-free public transport in Tallinn for all residents in 2013, a policy that the party still supports today.

==== Cultural Policy ====
Despite its reputation as a stronghold for ethnically non-Estonian voters, it professes support for the Estonian language as the basis for the Estonian national identity. However, it does promote respect for ethnic and linguistic minorities. As such, it was the only party to vote against a 2025 constitutional amendment which stripped the right of non-citizens to vote in local elections, which largely affected the substantial population of Russian citizens and stateless residents living in Estonia.

==== Social Policy ====
The party supports the creation of social welfare programs such as a social housing program and support for single parents. It also supports a strict immigration and migrant policy.

==== Foreign Policy ====
The party was divided over the question of EU accession. At a party congress in Tartu on 9 August 2003, a majority of delegates voted against EU membership. Party Chairman Edgar Savisaar, however, had advocated a position that would have allowed party members to decide for themselves how to vote in the upcoming membership referendum.

After the Russian invasion of Ukraine the party, under the leadership of Jüri Ratas, shifted its position on Russia. In March 2022 a agreement with United Russia signed in 2004 was annuelled. After Mihhail Kõlvart won the leadership election in September 2023, which was seen as the party returning to the old Russophone roots, ten out of the 16 MPs defected to other parties.

== European representation ==
The Estonian Centre Party currently has two members of the European Parliament, one of whom sits in the Renew Europe group and the other of whom sits in the European Conservatives and Reformists group. In the European Committee of the Regions, the Estonian Centre Party sits in the Renew Europe CoR group, with one full and two alternate members for the 2025–2030 mandate. Andres Jaadla is the Deputy Coordinator of the COTER Commission.

== Leadership ==
- Edgar Savisaar (1991–1995)
- Andra Veidemann (1995-1996)
- Edgar Savisaar (1996-2016)
- Jüri Ratas (2016–2023)
- Mihhail Kõlvart (2023–)

On 10 September 2023, Mihhail Kõlvart was elected party leader at a special party conference in Paide. He received 543 votes (51.91%), defeating Tanel Kiik who received 489 votes (46.75%).

== Election results ==
=== Parliamentary elections ===
Election	Leader	Votes	%	Seats	+/–	Status
1992	Edgar Savisaar	56,124	12.25 (#3)	15 / 101	New	Opposition
1995	Edgar Savisaar	76,634	14.17 (#2)	16 / 101	▲1	Coalition (1995)
1995	Edgar Savisaar	76,634	14.17 (#2)	16 / 101	▲1	Opposition (1995-1999)
1999	Edgar Savisaar	113,378	23.41 (#1)	28 / 101	▲12	Opposition (1999–2002)
1999	Edgar Savisaar	113,378	23.41 (#1)	28 / 101	▲12	Coalition (2002–2003)
2003	Edgar Savisaar	125,709	25.40 (#1)	28 / 101	Steady	Opposition (2003–2005)
2003	Edgar Savisaar	125,709	25.40 (#1)	28 / 101	Steady	Coalition (2005–2007)
2007	Edgar Savisaar	143,518	26.08 (#2)	29 / 101	▲1	Opposition
2011	Edgar Savisaar	134,124	23.32 (#2)	26 / 101	▼3	Opposition
2015	Edgar Savisaar	142,458	24.81 (#2)	27 / 101	▲1	Opposition (2015–2016)
2015	Edgar Savisaar	142,458	24.81 (#2)	27 / 101	▲1	Coalition (2016–2019)
2019	Jüri Ratas	129,618	23.10 (#2)	26 / 101	▼1	Coalition (2019–2022)
2019	Jüri Ratas	129,618	23.10 (#2)	26 / 101	▼1	Opposition (2022–2023)
2023	Jüri Ratas	93,254	15.28 (#3)	16 / 101	▼10	Opposition

=== European Parliament elections ===
Election	List leader	Votes	%	Seats	+/–	EP Group
2004	Vilja Toomast	40,704	17.53 (#2)	1 / 6	New	ALDE
2009	Edgar Savisaar	103,506	26.07 (#1)	2 / 6	▲1	ALDE
2014	Edgar Savisaar	73,419	22.4 (#2)	1 / 6	▼1	ALDE
2019	Yana Toom	47,799	14.39 (#3)	1 / 7	Steady	RE
2024	Mihhail Kõlvart	45,767	12.43 (#5)	1 / 7	Steady	RE

== See also ==
- List of political parties in Estonia
