= Triple Alliance (Estonia) =

Political alliance in Estonia

Triple Alliance cabinets
- 41st, 45th, 48th and 52nd majority cabinets of Estonia
- 1999–2002; 2007–2009; 2015–2016; 2022–2023
- Date established: 25 March 1999

Leadership and composition
- Head of state: Lennart Meri; Arnold Rüütel; Toomas Hendrik Ilves; Kersti Kaljulaid; Alar Karis
- Head of government: Mart Laar; Andrus Ansip; Taavi Rõivas; Kaja Kallas
- Member parties: Reform Party; Pro Patria Union/IRL/Isamaa; Moderates/Social Democrats
- Status in legislature: Majority cabinet (1999–2002) 53 / 101 (52%); Majority cabinet (2007–09) 60 / 101 (59%); Majority cabinet (2015–16) 59 / 101 (58%); Majority cabinet (2022–23) 56 / 101 (55%)

Formation and history
- Elections: 1999 election; 2007 election; 2015 election; 2019 election

Triple Alliance (Estonian: Kolmikliit) is a commonly used political term in Estonia to refer to the various coalition governments between the centre-left Social Democratic Party, centre-right Reform Party and conservative Isamaa or their predecessors. This coalition has formed four times in history — from 1999 to 2002, from 2007 to 2009, from 2015 to 2016 and from 2022 to 2023. None of the coalitions governments have lasted a full parliamentary term. All of the Triple Alliance cabinets have been the second ones of the respective Prime Minister.

== History ==
=== Mart Laar's second cabinet ===
In September 1997, the Reform Party, Pro Patria Union (predecessor of Isamaa) and Moderate People's Party (SDE) signed a cooperation agreement, with which the parliamentary group 'United Opposition' was created in order to oppose the perceived populism and left-leaning economics of the Coalition Party and Country Union-led and the Centre Party-backed coalition government. In January 1998, the Reform Party proposed to the Pro Patria Union and Moderates to come to an agreement to form a government in the event that the parties achieve a parliamentary majority in the upcoming 1999 election. At the end of 1998, the parties signed the agreement without agreeing on an eventual prime minister.

Siim Kallas, chairman of the Reform Party, wanted the leader of the party with the most votes to become prime minister. Other political parties were initially against it due the support of the Reform Party being much higher than that of the other signatories to the agreement and Kallas' reputation being tarnished by the 10 million dollar scandal. However, eventually the parties settled on the chairman of the party with the most votes becoming the prime minister.

Thus, the first coalition to bear the label was formed in 1999 between the Reform Party, Pro Patria Union and the Moderates. The government remained in office for over two and a half years. By late 2001, scandals related to the privatization of state-owned enterprises had made the government unpopular, and relations between the Pro Patria Union and the Reform Party deteriorated. In December 2001, the Reform Party entered a coalition with the Centre Party in Tallinn, as a result of which Edgar Savisaar became the mayor. This happened after Reform had left the same Triple Alliance governing coalition in Tallinn. Prime Minister Mart Laar decided to resign, as he felt that the national level Triple Alliance government had essentially collapsed

=== Andrus Ansip's second cabinet ===
The second Triple Alliance government took office after the 2007 election. The major issues that this government faced included the Bronze Night riots as well as the Great Recession. In the dire economic situation, the government was incapable of solving the problem of required budget cuts due to disagreements with the Social Democrats, who left from the coalition on 21 May 2009 together with its three ministers. Coalition talks with the People's Union of Estonia were derailed on 1 June 2009 by the party councils of the People's Union and of the Union of Pro Patria and Res Publica (IRL). Therefore, from 4 June 2009 the cabinet continued as a minority cabinet with 50 seats out of 101 in the Riigikogu without asking for a new mandate.

=== Taavi Rõivas's second cabinet ===
Following the 2015 election, Reform started coalition talks with the Social Democrats, Pro Patria and Res Publica Union (IRL) and the Free Party. After nearly three weeks of negotiations, the Free Party left the coalition talks, mainly due to disagreements on taxation and state funding of parties. Following that, Reform successfully negotiated a new Triple Alliance coalition with SDE and IRL, forming a second government headed by Rõivas in April.

On 7 November 2016, SDE and IRL announced that they were asking Prime Minister Taavi Rõivas to resign and were planning on negotiating a new majority government. The announcement came soon after the opposition had submitted a motion to express lack of confidence in Rõivas' government. SDE and IRL proceeded to support the motion, leaving the Reform the only party to support Rõivas. Rõivas commented the situation by declining to resign and arguing that a democratically elected government should be only removed by a democratic vote. In the following vote of confidence on 9 November, the majority of Riigikogu voted in favor of removing the government from office. In the following coalition talks, the Centre Party, SDE and IRL formed a new coalition led by Centre Party's chairman Jüri Ratas. The new coalition was sworn in on 23 November, bringing about the first government to not feature Reform since 1999 due to the collapse of the cordon sanitaire around the Centre Party after it elected a new leader, ending the long-lasting leadership of Edgar Savisaar, who had been perceived as too Russophilic.

=== Kaja Kallas' second cabinet ===
On 3 June 2022, Kaja Kallas dismissed Centre Party ministers from her first cabinet after several weeks of disputes between the two parties and Centre party voting with opposition against a government supported bill. Continuing with a minority cabinet, the Reform Party called up the conservative Isamaa and the Social Democrats for talks on a possible new coalition. On July 8, the three parties announced that they agreed on forming a new coalition government. Although law allows ministerial changes without cabinet resignation, Kallas stepped back so that the new coalition got to vote for the Prime Minister's mandate in the parliament. The new coalition was given a mandate by the Riigikogu on July 15 with a 52–26 vote. The coalition lasted until the aftermath of the 2023 election, when a new government coalition was negotiated.

== Control of portfolios by party ==
Moderates / SDE Reform Pro Patria Union / IRL / Isamaa

Portfolio	Party control																	
Portfolio	PM	Edu.	Finance	Def.	Social	Rural	Foreign	Justice	IT	Public Admin.	Interior	Culture	Econ.Affairs	Envir.	Health and Labour	Roads & Comms.	Reg.	Pop.
Laar II									—N/a	—N/a					—N/a			
Ansip II									—N/a	—N/a					—N/a	—N/a		
Rõivas II																—N/a	—N/a	—N/a
Kallas II																—N/a	—N/a	—N/a

== Alternatives ==
=== Municipal level ===
Triple Alliance coalitions were formed in the town of Kuressaare both in 2009 and later in 2021 when the entire Saaremaa island was one municipality.

Following the 2021 municipal elections, Reform, SDE and Isamaa formed a coalition in the town of Võru and city of Tartu.

=== Alternatives ===
In 2021, the Triple Alliance name was used to refer to a coalition in the Hiiumaa municipality but instead of Isamaa, it included a local electoral alliance as the third partner. Recently, the name has begun to be used more to refer to other coalitions consisting of three parties.

After the 2023 parliamentary election, there was speculation of a "new Triple Alliance" consisting of Reform, liberal Estonia 200 and the Social Democrats or Isamaa, although the traditional Triple Alliance remained an option.
