= Minister of Entrepreneurship and Information Technology =

Estonian cabinet position

The Minister of Entrepreneurship and Information Technology of Estonia (Estonian: Ettevõtlus- ja infotehnoloogiaminister) was a minister at the Ministry of Economic Affairs and Communications (Estonian: Majandus- ja kommunikatsiooniministeerium) in the Estonian Government.

== List of ministers ==
Name	Portrait	Party	Term of office		Duration	Prime Minister
Minister of Foreign Trade and Entrepreneurship
Anne Sulling		Reform	26 March 2014	9 April 2015	1 year, 14 days	Rõivas (I)
Minister of Entrepreneurship
Urve Palo		Social Democratic	9 April 2015	30 August 2015	143 days	Rõivas (II)
Liisa Oviir		Social Democratic	14 September 2015	23 November 2016	1 year, 70 days	Rõivas (II)
Minister of Entrepreneurship and Information Technology
Urve Palo		Social Democratic	23 November 2016	22 August 2018	1 year, 272 days	Ratas (I)
Rene Tammist		Social Democratic	22 August 2018	29 April 2019	6 years, 218 days	Ratas (I)
Minister of Foreign Trade and Information Technology
Marti Kuusik		EKRE	29 April 2019	30 April 2019	1 day	Ratas (II)
Kert Kingo		EKRE	16 May 2019	25 October 2019	162 days	Ratas (II)
Kaimar Karu		Independent (nominated by EKRE)	2 November 2019	20 April 2020	170 days	Ratas (II)
Raul Siem		EKRE	21 April 2020	26 January 2021	280 days	Ratas (II)
Minister of Entrepreneurship and Information Technology
Andres Sutt		Reform	26 January 2021	18 July 2022	1 year, 173 days	Kallas (I)
Kristjan Järvan		Pro Patria	18 July 2022	17 April 2023	273 days	Kallas (II)

== See also ==
- Ministry of Economic Affairs and Communications
