= Opinion polling for the 2019 Estonian parliamentary election =

In the run up to the 2019 Estonian parliamentary election, various organisations carry out opinion polling to gauge voting intention in Estonia. Results of such polls are displayed in this article.

The date range for these opinion polls are from the previous general election, held on 22 September 2015, to the 26–28 February 2019.

Poll results are listed in the table below in reverse chronological order, showing the most recent first. The highest percentage figure in each poll is displayed in bold, and the background shaded in the leading party's color. In the instance that there is a tie, then no figure is shaded.

== Graphical Summary ==
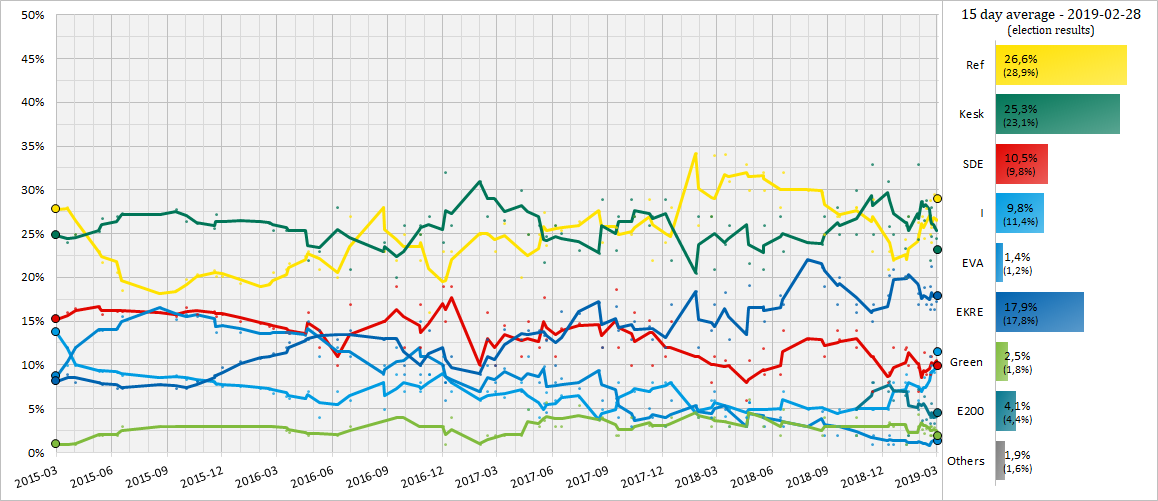
30 day moving average trend line of Estonian polls towards the election in 2019, each line corresponds to a political party.

== Polling Results ==
=== 2019 ===
Date	Polling firm	Ref	Kesk	SDE	I	EVA	EKRE	Green	E200	Others	Lead	Ratas' cabinet – Opposition
**3 Mar 2019**	**Election Results**	**28.9**	**23.1**	**9.8**	**11.4**	**1.2**	**17.8**	**1.8**	**4.4**	**1.6**	**5.8**	**44.3 – 55.7**
26–28 Feb 2019	Kantar Emor	**26.6**	24.5	11.9	10.1	1.3	17.3	2.2	4.3	1.8	2.1	46.5 – 45.2
28 Jan–24 Feb 2019	Norstat	**29.5**	25.7	10.2	9.2	1	16.4	2.9	3.3	1.8	3.8	45.1 – 46.9
7–20 Feb 2019	Turu-uuringute AS	24	**28**	11	10	2	17	3	4	1	4	49 – 43
14–20 Feb 2019	Kantar Emor	**25.7**	24.7	10.1	9.2	0.9	21.3	2	5.6	0.5	1	44 – 47.9
12–18 Feb 2019	Faktum Ariko	**25**	22	11	11	2	18	2	4	4	3	44 – 45
21 Jan–17 Feb 2019	Norstat	**28.8**	27.1	9	9.2	0.9	16.4	3	3.4	2.2	1.7	45.3 – 46.1
14 Jan–11 Feb 2019	Norstat	27.9	**28.8**	8.9	7.7	1	17	2.8	3.8	2.1	0.9	45.4 – 45.9
4–7 Feb 2019	Kantar Emor	24.5	**26.5**	11.5	8.6	0.7	18.9	2.2	6.4	0.7	2	46.6 – 44.1
7 Jan–4 Feb 2019	Norstat	27	**28.7**	9.1	7.4	0.7	17.7	2.7	3.7	3	1.7	45.2 – 45.4
24–29 Jan 2019	Kantar Emor	**26.3**	24.4	9.7	7.5	1.7	18.2	4.4	7.2	0.6	1.9	41.6 – 46.2
15–28 Jan 2019	Turu-uuringute AS	25	**33**	7	6	1	17	3	5	3	8	46 – 43
7–13 Jan 2019	Norstat	**27**	**27**	10	7	–	20	2	2	5	0	44 – 47
4–8 Jan 2019	Kantar Emor	**24.4**	23.3	11.8	8	1.4	20.2	3	6.6	1.3	1.1	43.1 – 46
3–9 Jan 2019	Turu-uuringute AS (Online poll)	20	**26**	12	9	1	20	1	7	4	6	47 – 41

=== 2018 ===
Date	Polling firm	Ref	Kesk	SDE	I	EVA	EKRE	Green	E200	Others	Lead	Ratas' cabinet – Opposition
13–19 Dec 2018	Turu-uuringute AS (Online poll)	22	**25**	12	8	1	21	3	6	2	3	45 – 44
December 2018	Kantar Emor	23	**25.9**	9.2	7.8	2	20.3	3.5	8.2	–	2.9	42.9 – 45.3
December 2018	Turu-uuringute AS	21	**31**	8	5	1	18	3	7	6	10	44 – 43
November 2018	Turu-uuringute AS	23	**33**	7	5	1	15	3	8	5	10	45 – 39
November 2018	Kantar Emor	**29**	25	11	5	2	17	3	8	–	4	41 – 48
October 2018	Kantar Emor	**28**	25	14	5	2	16	4	5	1	3	44 – 46
October 2018	Turu-uuringute AS	28	**30**	12	5	2	17	2	–	4	2	47 – 47
September 2018	Kantar Emor	**27**	25	13	5	3	20	3	–	4.7	2	43 – 50
September 2018	Turu-uuringute AS	27	**28**	14	3	2	17	3	–	6	1	45 – 46
August 2018	Turu-uuringute AS	25	**27**	11	5	2	19	4	–	7	2	43 – 46
August 2018	Kantar Emor	**29.8**	23.8	12.7	5.2	4.7	21.2	2	–	0.6	6	41.7 – 55.7
July 2018	Kantar Emor	**30**	24	13	5	3	22	3	–	0.7	6	42 – 55
June 2018	Kantar Emor	**32**	23	14	7	3	17	5	–	–	9	44 – 52
June 2018	Turu-uuringute AS	**28**	27	9	5	4	18	2	–	7	1	41 – 50
May 2018	Kantar Emor	**32**	21	11.9	5	4	16.7	3	–	6.4	11	37.9 – 52.7
May 2018	Turu-uuringute AS	**30**	26	9	5	3	15	4	–	8	4	40 – 48
April 2018	Kantar Emor	**30**	21.6	10.6	5.8	5.8	19.1	6.1	–	1	8.4	38 – 54.9
April 2018	Turu-uuringute AS	**33**	26	6	4	3	14	3	–	9	7	36 – 50
8–21 Mar 2018	Turu-uuringute AS	**31**	26	10	5	3	13	3	–	9	5	41 – 47
8–14 Mar 2018	Kantar Emor	**34.1**	23.8	10.6	4.1	5.0	18.3	3.6	–	0.5	10.3	38.5 – 57.4
7–20 Feb 2018	Turu-uuringute AS	**27**	**27**	8	6	4	14	3	–	11	0	41 – 45
Feb 2018	Kantar Emor	**34**	21	11	6	7	17	4	–	0	13	38 – 58
15–29 Jan 2018	Turu-uuringute AS	26	**27**	11	5	4	12	4	–	11	1	43 – 42
18–25 Jan 2018	Kantar Emor	**34.2**	20.5	11	4.5	5.4	18.4	4.5	–	1.5	13.7	36 – 58

=== 2017 ===
Date	Polling firm	Ref	Kesk	SDE	I	EVA	EKRE	Green	Others	Lead	Ratas' cabinet – Opposition
8–14 Dec 2017	Kantar Emor	**28**	22	15	8	6	17	4	0	6	45 – 51
22 Nov–5 Dec 2017	Turu-uuringute AS	24	**29**	11	8	3	12	3	10	5	48 – 39
1–14 Nov 2017	Turu-uuringute AS	22	**27**	10	8	4	13	3	13	5	45 – 39
1–9 Nov 2017	Kantar Emor	**29.0**	26.0	15.1	7.0	5.1	14.4	3.1	0.3	3	48.1 – 48.5
Oct 2017	Kantar Emor	**27**	**27**	16	7	4	15	3	1	0	50 – 46
26 Sep–10 Oct 2017	Turu-uuringute AS	25	**29**	10	7	3	13	4	9	4	46 – 41
5–18 Sep 2017	Turu-uuringute AS	25	**27**	12	8	4	14	2	8	2	47 – 43
8–14 Sep 2017	Kantar Emor	**25.7**	23.1	18.7	5.8	6.2	16.7	2.0	1.8	2.6	47.6 – 48,6
9–22 Aug 2017	Turu-uuringute AS	24	**29**	12	5	6	12	4	8	5	46 – 42
11–17 Aug 2017	TNS Emor	**27.6**	22.8	14.6	3.8	9.4	17.2	3.7	0.9	4.8	41.2 – 54.2
Jul 2017	TNS Emor	**26.4**	23.1	14.8	6.3	7.4	15.9	5.4	0.7	3.3	44.2 – 49.7
9–16 June 2017	TNS Emor	**25.4**	25.1	14.2	6.6	8.5	16.2	3	1	0.3	45.9 – 50.1
25 May–6 Jun 2017	Turu-uuringute AS	**26**	**26**	11	6	8	10	3	10	0	43 – 44
17–22 May 2017	Turu-uuringute AS	23.7	**24.7**	12.9	6.9	4.6	12.8	5.7	8.7	1	44.5 – 41.1
12–18 May 2017	TNS Emor	**27.5**	21.8	17.8	5.6	9.9	13.4	3.7	0.3	5.7	45.2 – 50.8
25 Apr–9 May 2017	Turu-uuringute AS	25	**26**	12	4	8	14	3	8	1	42 – 47
Apr 2017	TNS Emor	**25**	**25**	15	5	11	14	5	1	0	45 – 50
28 Mar–10 Apr 2017	Turu-uuringute AS	20	**30**	11	8	7	13	2	9	10	49 – 40
1–14 Mar 2017	Turu-uuringute AS	25	**29**	11	7	7	8	3	10	4	47 – 40
Mar 2017	TNS Emor	26	**27**	15	6	10	14	2	0	1	48 – 50
Feb 2017	Turu-uuringute AS	23	**29**	10	7	8	10	2	11	6	46 – 41
Feb 2017	TNS Emor	25	**27**	16	7	10	13	2	0	2	50 – 48
19–31 Jan 2017	Turu-uuringute AS	25	**31**	10	6	7	9	1	11	6	47 – 41

=== 2016 ===
Date	Polling firm	Ref	Kesk	SDE	I	EVA	EKRE	Green	Others	Lead	Ratas' cabinet – Opposition
Dec 2016	TNS Emor	23	**26**	19	7	8	11	4	2	3	52 – 42
Dec 2016	Turu-uuringute AS	20	**32**	15	8	6	8	1	10	12	55 – 34
23 Nov 2016	**Jüri Ratas' cabinet is sworn in**										
Nov 2016	TNS Emor	23	**24**	19	9	11	10	3	1	1	—
Nov 2016	Turu-uuringute AS	21	**29**	13	9	9	12	–	7	8	—

Date	Polling firm	Ref	Kesk	SDE	I	EVA	EKRE	Green	Others	Lead	Rõivas' cabinet – Opposition
9 Nov 2016	**Taavi Rõivas loses the vote of no confidence in Riigikogu**										
Oct 2016	TNS Emor	22	**25**	17	8	15	10	3	0	3	47 – 50
Oct 2016	Turu-uuringute AS	25	**26**	12	7	9	10	–	11	1	44 – 45
Sep 2016	TNS Emor	**22**	20	19	9	12	13	4	1	2	50 – 45
Sep 2016	Turu-uuringute AS	25	**26**	12	7	9	10	–	11	1	44 – 45
Aug 2016	TNS Emor	**28**	23	15	8	9	13	3	1	5	51 – 45
Aug 2016	Turu-uuringute AS	23	**24**	15	5	10	13	–	10	1	43 – 47
Jun 2016	TNS Emor	**27**	21	17	6	11	14	3	1	6	50 – 46
Jun 2016	Turu-uuringute AS	20	**28**	10	7	12	13	2	8	8	37 – 53
May 2016	Turu-uuringute AS	21	**23**	12	4	11	14	–	15	2	37 – 48
Apr 2016	TNS Emor	**23**	22	16	7	15	13	2	2	1	46 – 50
Apr 2016	Turu-uuringute AS	21	**25**	13	7	12	14	–	8	4	41 – 51
Mar 2016	Turu-uuringute AS	23	**25**	13	6	12	13	–	8	2	42 – 50
Mar 2016	TNS Emor	23	**25**	14	6	15	14	2	1	2	43 – 54
Feb 2016	Turu-uuringute AS	23	**29**	12	6	12	11	–	7	6	41 – 52
Feb 2016	TNS Emor	**22**	**22**	16	6	16	13	3	2	0	44 – 51
Jan 2016	Turu-uuringute AS	17	**26**	13	7	13	12	–	12	9	37 – 51

=== 2015 ===
Date	Polling firm	Ref	Kesk	SDE	I	EVA	EKRE	Green	Others	Lead	Rõivas' cabinet – Opposition
Dec 2015	Turu-uuringute AS	20	**25**	14	7	13	10	–	11	5	41 – 48
Dec 2015	TNS Emor	21	**25**	16	8	15	11	3	1	3	45 – 51
Nov 2015	Turu-uuringute AS	17	**33**	13	8	11	9	–	9	16	38 – 53
Nov 2015	TNS Emor	20	**23**	16	7	16	12	3	1	3	43 – 51
Oct 2015	Turu-uuringute AS	19	**27**	14	8	14	10	–	8	8	41 – 51
Sep 2015	TNS Emor	**24**	**24**	18	7	17	7	3	1	0	49 – 48
Sep 2015	Turu-uuringute AS	21	**29**	15	9	11	6	–	9	8	45 – 46
Aug 2015	TNS Emor	20	**25**	16	9	17	9	3	2	5	45 – 51
Jun 2015	Turu-uuringute AS	16	**28**	18	9	15	6	–	8	10	43 – 49
Jun 2015	TNS Emor	18	**26**	16	8	19	9	3	1	7	42 – 54
May 2015	Turu-uuringute AS	18	**31**	13	9	14	7	–	8	13	40 – 52
May 2015	TNS Emor	19	**26**	17	8	18	8	3	1	7	44 – 52
Apr 2015	Turu-uuringute AS	22	**26**	17	10	12	7	–	6	4	49 – 45
Mar 2015	TNS Emor	**28**	24	16	10	12	9	1	0	4	54 – 45
**1 Mar 2015**	**Election results**	**27.7**	**24.8**	**15.2**	**13.7**	**8.7**	**8.1**	**0.9**	**0.9**	**2.9**	**56.6 – 41.6**
