= Indrek Saar =

Estonian politician and actor

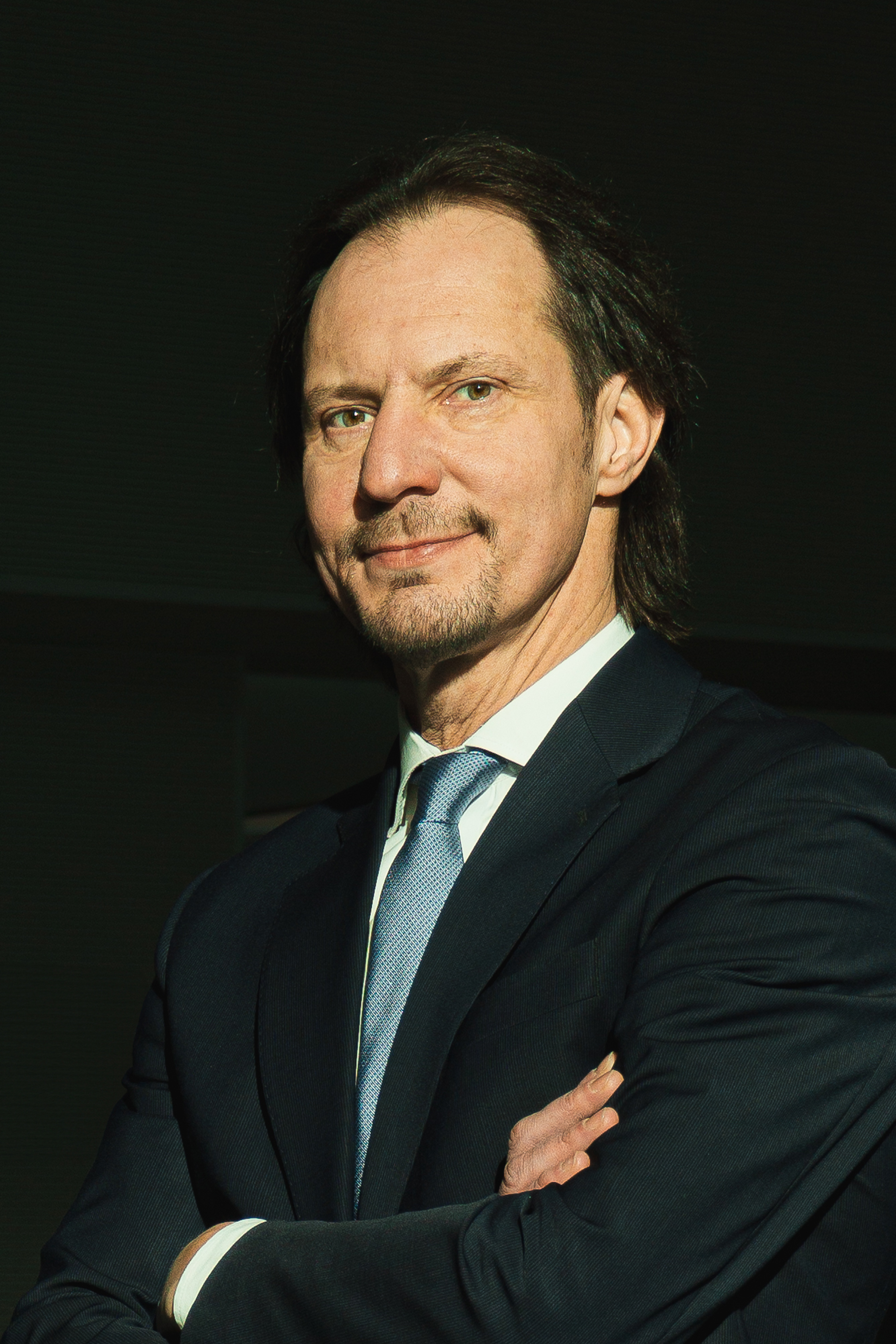
- Saar in 2024

Leader of the Social Democratic Party
- In office 9 June 2019 – 5 February 2022
- Preceded by: Jevgeni Ossinovski
- Succeeded by: Lauri Läänemets

Minister of Culture
- In office 9 April 2015 – 29 April 2019
- Prime Minister: Taavi Rõivas; Jüri Ratas
- Preceded by: Urve Tiidus
- Succeeded by: Tõnis Lukas

Personal details
- Born: 20 February 1973 (age 53) Kuressaare, Saare, then part of Estonian SSR, Soviet Union
- Party: Social Democratic Party
- Spouse: Ülle Lichtfeldt
- Children: 2
- Education: Estonian Academy of Music and Theatre

Indrek Saar (born February 20, 1973) is an Estonian actor and politician. He was the leader of the Social Democratic Party from 2019 to 2022 and Minister of Culture of Estonia from 2015 to 2019.

Saar was elected to the Riigikogu in consecutive general elections in 2007, 2011, 2015 and 2019 and served as a member of the XI, XII, XIII and XIV Riigikogu from 2007 to 2023.

Saar attended secondary school in Kuressaare and graduated from the Estonian Academy of Music and Higher Drama (now, the Estonian Academy of Music and Theatre) in Tallinn. He was an actor and director of the Rakvere Theatre from 1996 until 2005. From 2002 until 2007, he was Deputy Chairman of Rakvere City Council. In 2004 and 2005, he was a theatre director and advisor at the NO99 theatre and from 2006 to 2007, he was a chief executive officer at the NO99 theatre.

According to Saar, his decision to enter national politics was spurred by the suggestion by the then leader of the People's Union of Estonia party, Villu Reiljan that "people of the arts remain true to their trade" in response to 80 renowned Estonian writers, composers, actors, artists and scientists endorsing Toomas Hendrik Ilves for the office of President of Estonia in 2006.

As the Estonian minister of culture, Saar oversaw a substantial rise in the wages of state-employed culture and arts professionals and sports instructors as well as a general overhaul of the principles of funding sports. He also presided over the sessions of culture ministers in the Council of the European Union, achieving significant progress in the negotiations over the Audiovisual Media Services Directive.

As a member of parliament, Saar was the chair and vice chair of the Social Democratic parliamentary group as well as the deputy chair of the constitutional committee and a member of the legal affairs committee and the European Union affairs committee.

Saar served as a representative in the Estonian delegation to the Parliamentary Assembly of the Council of Europe (PACE) between 2007 and 2023, having served as the chairperson of the national delegation, the chairperson of the Committee on Rules of Procedure as well as the vice-chairperson of the Socialists, Democrats and Greens Group. Saar has participated in election monitoring missions in Moldova (as the leader of the delegation), Albania, Azerbaijan, Georgia, Montenegro, Serbia, Ukraine as well as Russia and has been co-rapporteur of the PACE for the monitoring of Serbia. Saar has worked in several PACE committees: the Committee on Migration, Refugees and Displaced Persons, the Monitoring Committee the Committee on Political Affairs and Democracy, the Social, Health and Family Affairs Committee, the Committee on Culture, Science, Education and Media as well as the Committee on Equality and Non-Discrimination.

From 1995 until 2015, Indrek Saar played the role of Raim Raidver on the long-running ETV television drama series Õnne 13.

== Background ==
=== Early life and education ===
Indrek Saar was born in Kuressaare, the administrative centre of the Saaremaa island. His father Jüri Saar has served as the County Governor of Saaremaa as well as the mayor of the rural municipalities of Pihtla and Kihelkonna and was a member of the Estonian parliament from 2003 to 2007.

Saar graduated from Kuressaare Secondary School No. 2 in 1991 and studied as an exchange student in Rønne, Denmark. He received a master's degree in acting from the theatre faculty of the Estonian Academy of Music in 1996. Saar speaks Estonian, English, Danish and Russian, with a limited proficiency in German and French.

=== Early career ===
In 1995, Saar was cast as Raim Randver in the long-running ETV drama Õnne 13. He appeared in the role as a regular cast member until 2015.

From 1996 to 2005, Indrek Saar was the director of the Rakvere Theatre (from 2005, manager of the foundation Rakvere Teatrimaja). In 2004 and 2005, he served as an adviser at Vanalinnastuudio/Theatre NO99, becoming the chief executive officer of Theatre NO99 from 2006 to 2007.

Indrek Saar has served as the member of the supervisory boards of the Estonian public broadcaster Eesti Rahvusringhääling, Rakvere Theatre, Theatre NO99, the Estonian National Opera, the Estonian Academy of Arts and the Cultural Endowment of Estonia. He is a member of the Association of Professional Actors of Estonia and of the Estonian Stage Fight Society.

Since 2020, Saar has been a member of the executive board of the Estonian Olympic Committee.

=== Family ===
Saar is married to actress Ülle Lichtfeldt. The couple have two daughters and two grandchildren.

== Political career ==
Indrek Saar has been a member of the Social Democratic Party since 1998. From 2002 to 2007, he was the deputy chairman of the municipal council of Rakvere. Saar was elected as the deputy chairman of the Social Democratic Party on 7 March 2009. He served as the Secretary General of the party from 2011 to 2015. Indrek Saar was the chairman of the Social Democratic Party from 9 June 2019 until 5 February 2022. He has also been the leader of the party organisations in Rakvere and Lääne-Viru County.

=== Member of parliament ===
Saar was first elected to the Riigikogu in 2007 election with 1,855 votes. He was elected again in the 2011 and 2015 elections, with 3,931 and 1,944 votes respectively. In 2019, he was again elected to the Riigikogu.

Indrek Saar was a member of the Foreign Affairs Committee of the Estonian Parliament from 2019 to 2023.

As deputy chairman of the Social Democratic Party from 2009, Indrek Saar was involved in merger talks with the People's Union of Estonia. After the Congress of the People's Union rejected the merger proposal presented by the party leadership on 23 May 2010, several members of the management board and other leading members of the People's Union, including half the People's Union's caucus in the Estonian parliament, joined the Social Democratic Party. In the Estonian parliamentary election in March 2011, the enlarged Social Democratic Party achieved the highest share of the vote since the restoration of Estonia's independence in 1991, with 19,1 per cent of the vote and 19 seats in the 101-member legislature.

=== Secretary General of the Social Democratic Party ===
Indrek Saar was appointed Secretary General of the Social Democratic Party in 2011, his candidacy was proposed by the party chairman Sven Mikser. As secretary general, Saar oversaw the merger of the Russian Party in Estonia with the Social Democratic Party in 2012 and the surge of the party in the polls to the position of the most popular political party in Estonia with a support of 27 per cent in the spring of 2013.

At the municipal elections in 2013, the Social Democratic Party received 12.5 per cent of the vote. Social Democrats became mayors in Kuressaare, Paide, Põltsamaa, Valga as well as Võru; after a years-long hiatus, the party became one partner of the governing coalition in Tartu, the second city of Estonia. At the elections to the European Parliament in 2014, the party received 13.6 per cent of the vote and one of the six seats reserved for Estonia.

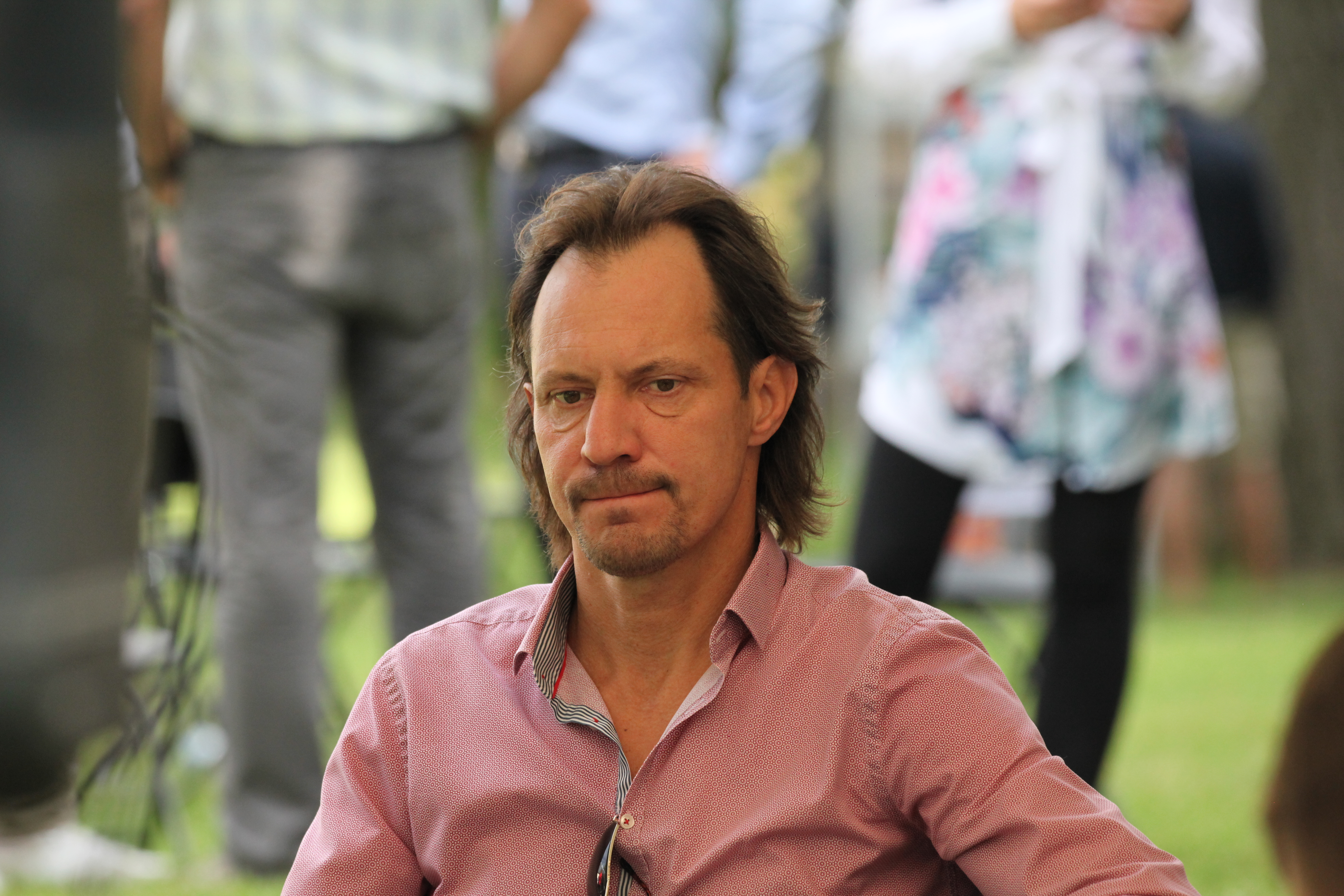
Saar at Arvamusfestival in 2021

In 2014, the Social Democratic Party formed a coalition government with the Estonian Reform Party. The government proceeded to increase universal family benefits and propose amendments to the Estonian nationality law that, after being passed by the parliament, eased the eligibility criteria for Estonian citizenship for children and the elderly. According to Saar, the changes were meant to "strengthen the rule of law, the cohesion of the society and the loyalty of the people to the state" without undermining the prior principles of Estonian citizenship policy. The coalition also passed the Registered Partnership Act allowing civil unions for same-sex couples.

=== Minister of Culture ===
Indrek Saar was the minister of culture of Estonia in the second cabinet of prime minister Taavi Rõivas and the first cabinet of prime minister Jüri Ratas from 9 April 2015 to 29 April 2019, making him the longest-serving Estonian minister of culture. During the tenure of Indrek Saar from 2015 to 2019, the government of Estonia and the Ministry of Culture accepted measures raising the minimum public-sector wages of people employed in culture, the arts and sports by 78 per cent, from 731 euros to 1300 euros per month.

During the Estonian presidency of the Council of the European Union in 2017, Saar presided the meetings of ministers of culture and sports of the EU member states (the Education, Youth, Culture and Sport Council configuration), achieving notable progress in the negotiations on the draft Audiovisual Media Services Directive (adopted in 2018). Saar's tenure as the Minister of Culture also included the celebration of the 100th anniversary of the Republic of Estonia that included a programme of cultural events spanning a period of over a year.

== Awards and decorations ==
- Culture Worker of the Year (Estonia, 2001)
- Annual Award of the Cultural Endowment of Estonia in Dramatic Arts 2001 (for elevating and maintaining the artistic level of the Rakvere Theatre; shared with Üllar Saaremäe)
- Ants Lauter Theatre Award for rejuvenating Rakvere Theatre (Estonia, 2005)
- Commander, Order of Civil Merit (Spain, 2007)
- City Decoration of Rakvere (Rakvere Kroonimärk, 2008)
- Medal of Merit of the Estonian Association of Architects (2018)
- Badge of Merit of the Estonian Olympic Committee (2019)
- Order of the National Coat of Arms, 3rd Class (Estonia, 2023)
- Title of honorary associate of the Parliamentary Assembly of the Council of Europe and Assembly medal, 2023.

Political offices
Preceded by Urve Tiidus	Minister of Culture; 2015–2019	Succeeded by Tõnis Lukas
