= Taavi Rõivas's first cabinet =

Cabinet of Estonia (2014–2015)

- 47th Cabinet of Estonia
- Date formed: 26 March 2014
- Date dissolved: 30 March 2015

People and organisations
- Head of state: Toomas Hendrik Ilves
- Head of government: Taavi Rõivas
- No. of ministers: 14
- Member party: Estonian Reform Party, Social Democratic Party
- Status in legislature: Majority cabinet
- Opposition parties: Estonian Centre Party; Pro Patria and Res Publica Union

History
- Election: 2011 election
- Legislature term: 4 years
- Predecessor: Andrus Ansip's third cabinet
- Successor: Taavi Rõivas's second cabinet

Taavi Rõivas's first cabinet was the cabinet of Estonia from March 26, 2014 to March 30, 2015. It was a coalition cabinet of free market liberal Estonian Reform Party and Social Democratic Party.

== Ministers ==
Portfolio	Minister	Took office	Left office	Party
Government's Office
Prime Minister	Taavi Rõivas	26 March 2014	to the next cabinet	Reform
Ministry of Finance
Minister of Finance	Jürgen Ligi	4 June 2009	3 November 2014	Reform
Minister of Finance	Maris Lauri	3 November 2014	30 March 2015	Reform
Ministry of Foreign Affairs
Minister of Foreign Affairs	Urmas Paet	13 April 2005	3 November 2014	Reform
Minister of Foreign Affairs	Keit Pentus-Rosimannus	17 November 2014	to the next cabinet	Reform
Ministry of Economic Affairs and Communications
Minister of Economic Affairs and Infrastructure	Urve Palo	26 March 2014	30 March 2015	SDE
Minister of Foreign Trade and Entrepreneurship	Anne Sulling	26 March 2014	30 March 2015	Reform
Ministry of Justice
Minister of Justice	Andres Anvelt	26 March 2014	30 March 2015	SDE
Ministry of Defence
Minister of Defence	Sven Mikser	26 March 2014	to the next cabinet	SDE
Ministry of Culture
Minister of Culture	Urve Tiidus	4 December 2013	30 March 2015	Reform
Ministry of the Interior
Minister of the Interior and Regional Affairs	Hanno Pevkur	26 March 2014	to the next cabinet	Reform
Ministry of Education and Research
Minister of Education and Research	Jevgeni Ossinovski	26 March 2014	30 March 2015	SDE
Ministry of the Environment
Minister of the Environment	Keit Pentus-Rosimannus	6 April 2011	17 November 2014	Reform
Minister of the Environment	Mati Raidma	17 November 2014	30 March 2015	Reform
Ministry of Social Affairs
Minister of Social Protection	Helmen Kütt	26 March 2014	30 March 2015	SDE
Minister of Health and Labour	Urmas Kruuse	26 March 2014	30 March 2015	Reform
Ministry of Agriculture
Minister of Agriculture	Ivari Padar	7 April 2014	30 March 2015	SDE

== Resignations ==
On 3 November 2014 Minister of Finance, Jürgen Ligi, resigned due to public pressure after scandalous Facebook post in which he insulted the Minister of Education and Research Jevgeni Ossinovski. On the same day Maris Lauri became the new Minister of Finance.

Also on 3 November 2014 Minister of Foreign Affairs, Urmas Paet, resigned to become an MP in the European Parliament.

== See also ==
- Politics of Estonia
- Lists of office-holders

Preceded by Andrus Ansip's third cabinet	Government of Estonia; 2014–2015	Succeeded by Taavi Rõivas's second cabinet
