= Urmas Reinsalu =

Estonian politician (born 1975)

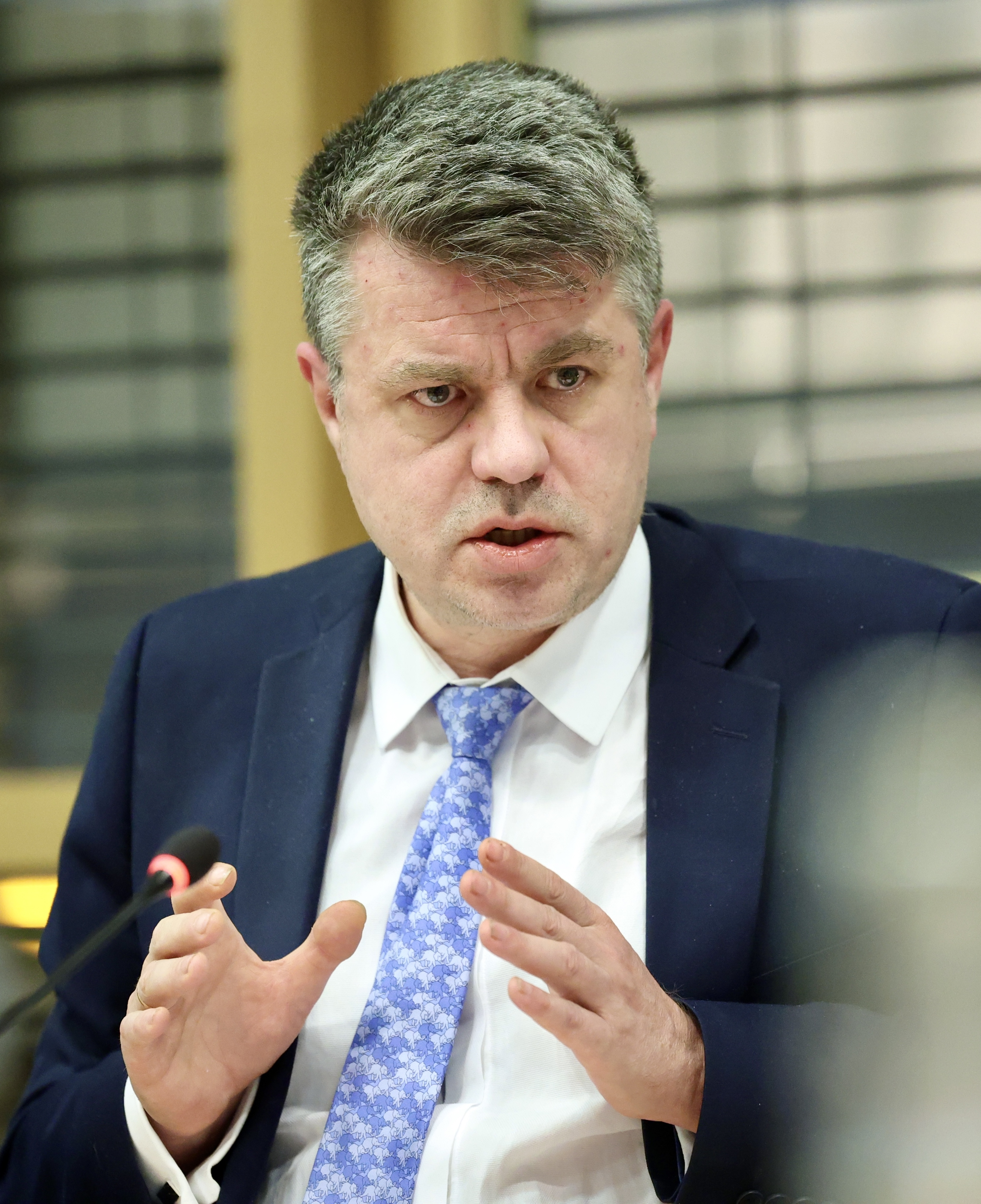
- Reinsalu in 2025

Leader of Isamaa
- Incumbent
- Assumed office 11 May 2023
- Preceded by: Helir-Valdor Seeder
- In office 28 January 2012 – 6 June 2015
- Preceded by: Mart Laar
- Succeeded by: Margus Tsahkna

Minister of Foreign Affairs
- In office 18 July 2022 – 17 April 2023
- Prime Minister: Kaja Kallas
- Preceded by: Eva-Maria Liimets
- Succeeded by: Margus Tsahkna
- In office 29 April 2019 – 26 January 2021
- Prime Minister: Jüri Ratas
- Preceded by: Sven Mikser
- Succeeded by: Eva-Maria Liimets

Minister of Justice
- In office 9 April 2015 – 29 April 2019
- Prime Minister: Taavi Rõivas; Jüri Ratas
- Preceded by: Andres Anvelt
- Succeeded by: Raivo Aeg

Minister of Defence
- In office 11 May 2012 – 26 March 2014
- Prime Minister: Andrus Ansip
- Preceded by: Mart Laar
- Succeeded by: Sven Mikser

Member of the Riigikogu
- Incumbent
- Assumed office 10 April 2023
- In office 2 March 2003 – 14 May 2012

Personal details
- Born: 22 June 1975 (age 51) Tallinn, then part of Estonian SSR, Soviet Union
- Party: Isamaa (since 2006)
- Children: 2
- Education: University of Tartu

Urmas Reinsalu (Estonian: [ˈuɾmɑs ˈɾeinsɑlu]; born 22 June 1975) is an Estonian politician who served as Minister of Foreign Affairs from 2022 to 2023 and previously from 2019 to 2021. Before that, Urmas has served as the Minister of Defence between 2012 and 2014, and Minister of Justice from 2015 to 2019. Reinsalu is a member and current leader of the Isamaa ("Fatherland") political party (formerly called the Pro Patria and Res Publica Union), and was the party leader from 2012 to 2015.

== Early life and education ==
Reinsalu was born in Tallinn, Estonia, on 22 June 1975. He graduated from the Tallinn Secondary School No. 37. He then studied law at the University of Tartu, graduating in 1997.

== Political career ==
=== Early years ===
From 1996 to 1997, Reinsalu worked as a specialist in public law in the Estonian Ministry of Justice, and as an advisor to then Estonian President from 1996 to 1998. In 1998, Reinsalu was appointed Director of the Office of the President of Estonia, when Lennart Meri was in office. From 2001 to 2002, he worked as the political secretary of the Res Publica Party. From 2002 to 2003, Reinsalu was a lecturer in the Estonian Academy of Security Sciences.

From 2007 to 2013, Reinsalu was a member of the Riigikogu, the unicameral parliament of Estonia. On 28 January 2012, Reinsalu became the chairman of the Pro Patria and Res Publica Union, an Estonian national-conservative, Christian-democratic political party, replacing Mart Laar. He was elected chairman with an absolute majority in the first round of voting at the party congress held in Tallinn.

=== Minister of Defence (2012-2015) ===
On 11 May 2012, Reinsalu was appointed minister of defence, replacing Mart Laar, who resigned from office for health reasons. Reinsalu's term as the minister of defence ended on 26 March 2014, when he was replaced by Sven Mikser. From 2014 to 2015, he was a member of the Riigikogu.

=== Minister of Justice (2015-2019) ===
In the 2015 parliamentary election, Reinsalu was re-elected to the Riigikogu with 2,949 individual votes. On 9 April 2015, Reinsalu became the minister of justice in Taavi Rõivas' second cabinet.

As the Pro Patria and Res Publica Union was the biggest loser in the elections with 9 seats lost, Reinsalu announced he would resign as party chairman after the party's congress in June 2015. On 6 June 2015, he was replaced by Margus Tsahkna in the post.

=== Minister of Foreign Affairs (2019-2021, 2022-2023) ===
Reinsalu was the Estonian Minister of Foreign Affairs from April 2019 until January 2021.

He returned to the foreign ministry in July 2022, after Prime Minister Kaja Kallas dismissed her Estonian Centre Party coalition partners.

On 31 March 2023 at a meeting of the Bucharest Nine Reinsalu called for the cancellation of the NATO-Russia Founding Act, because in his view cooperation with the country was "out of the question".

At the NATO Foreign Ministers' Meeting on 4–5 April 2023 in an exclusive interview with the Kyiv Independent Reinsalu warned that a "false peace is prelude to new wars"; Reinsalu "think[s] it is very reasonable" if his country acted as a conduit for the Ukrainians to obtain F-16s.

== Controversies ==
In 2012, Reinsalu was criticized for endorsing Estonia's "Valentine's Day Law" that declared Estonian WW2 veterans who fought on the side of Nazi Germany (including members of the 20th Waffen Grenadier Division of the SS) "freedom fighters", and for attending the meeting of the Union of Estonian Freedom Fighters (an organization of these veterans) on the island Saaremaa. During his visit, Reinsalu gave a laudatory speech to the veterans for having "liberated Estonia". Later on, in July 2013, he sent his greetings to the Union, praising the organization for "keeping the ideals of liberty alive".

In January 2014, Reinsalu also drew ire for lauding the Waffen SS veteran Harald Nugiseks, who was the recipient of Nazi Germany's highest military award Knight's Cross of the Iron Cross, at his honorary burial.

== Personal life ==
Ummi is married and has two children. He is fluent in English, German, Russian and Finnish.

== Notes ==
Previously called the Pro Patria and Res Publica Union.

Political offices
Preceded by Mart Laar	Minister of Defence; 2012–2014	Succeeded by Sven Mikser
Preceded by Mart Laar	Leader of the Pro Patria and Res Publica Union; 2012–2015	Succeeded by Margus Tsahkna
Preceded by Andres Anvelt	Minister of Justice; 2015–2019	Succeeded by Raivo Aeg
Preceded by Sven Mikser; Andres Sutt (acting)	Minister of Foreign Affairs; 2019–2021	Succeeded by Eva-Maria Liimets
Preceded by Eva-Maria Liimets	Minister of Foreign Affairs; 2022–2023	Succeeded by Margus Tsahkna
