= Jüri Ratas's first cabinet =

2016 Estonian government

Jüri Ratas's cabinet
- 49th Cabinet of Estonia

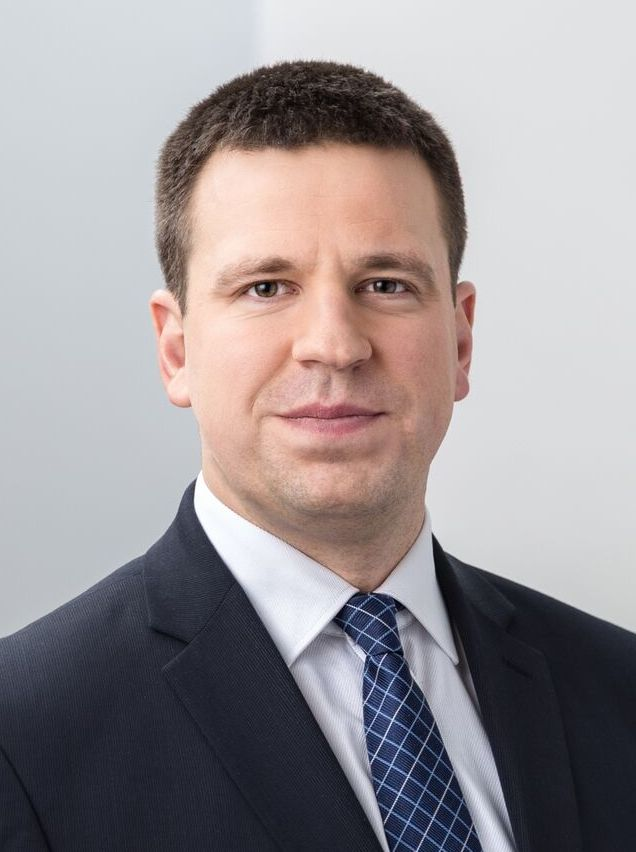
- Date formed: 23 November 2016
- Date dissolved: 29 April 2019

People and organisations
- Head of state: Kersti Kaljulaid
- Head of government: Jüri Ratas
- No. of ministers: 15
- Ministers removed: 9
- Total no. of members: 24
- Member parties: Centre; SDE; Pro Patria
- Status in legislature: Majority cabinet
- Opposition parties: Reform; Free Party; EKRE

History
- Election: 2015 election
- Predecessor: Taavi Rõivas's second cabinet
- Successor: Jüri Ratas's second cabinet

Jüri Ratas's cabinet was the 49th cabinet of Estonia, in office from 23 November 2016 to 29 April 2019. It was a centre-left coalition cabinet of Centre Party, Social Democratic Party and conservative Pro Patria and Res Publica Union. It was preceded by the Second Cabinet of Taavi Rõivas, a cabinet that ended when Social Democrats and the Union of Pro Patria and Res Publica joined the opposition's no confidence vote against the cabinet. This was the first time since 1999 the liberal centre-right Reform Party were out of the government.

== Ministers ==
Centre Party and Social Democratic Party announced the names of their chosen cabinet ministers on 19 November, whereas Pro Patria and Res Publica made the announcement on 21 November.

| Portfolio | Minister | Took office | Left office | Party |
Government's Office
| Prime Minister | Jüri Ratas | 23 November 2016 | to the next cabinet | Centre |
Ministry of Finance
| Minister of Finance | Sven Sester | 9 April 2015 | 12 June 2017 | Pro Patria (Estonian political party) |
| Minister of Finance | Toomas Tõniste | 12 June 2017 | 29 April 2019 | Pro Patria (Estonian political party) |
| Minister of Public Administration | Mihhail Korb | 23 November 2016 | 12 June 2017 | Centre |
| Minister of Public Administration | Jaak Aab | 12 June 2017 | 2 May 2018 | Centre |
| Minister of Public Administration | Janek Mäggi | 2 May 2018 | 29 April 2019 | Centre |
Ministry of Foreign Affairs
| Minister of Foreign Affairs | Sven Mikser | 23 November 2016 | 29 April 2019 | SDE |
Ministry of Economic Affairs and Communications
| Minister of Economic Affairs and Infrastructure | Kadri Simson | 23 November 2016 | 29 April 2019 | Centre |
| Minister of Entrepreneurship and Information Technology | Urve Palo | 23 November 2016 | 22 August 2018 | SDE |
| Minister of Entrepreneurship and Information Technology | Rene Tammist | 22 August 2018 | 29 April 2019 | SDE |
Ministry of Justice
| Minister of Justice | Urmas Reinsalu | 9 April 2015 | 29 April 2019 | Pro Patria (Estonian political party) |
Ministry of Defence
| Minister of Defence | Margus Tsahkna | 23 November 2016 | 12 June 2017 | Pro Patria (Estonian political party) |
| Minister of Defence | Jüri Luik | 12 June 2017 | to the next cabinet | Pro Patria (Estonian political party) |
Ministry of Culture
| Minister of Culture | Indrek Saar | 9 April 2015 | 29 April 2019 | SDE |
Ministry of the Interior
| Minister of the Interior | Andres Anvelt | 23 November 2016 | 26 November 2018 | SDE |
| Minister of the Interior | Katri Raik | 26 November 2018 | 29 April 2019 | SDE |
Ministry of Education and Research
| Minister of Education and Research | Mailis Reps | 23 November 2016 | to the next cabinet | Centre |
Ministry of the Environment
| Minister of the Environment | Marko Pomerants | 9 April 2015 | 12 June 2017 | Pro Patria (Estonian political party) |
| Minister of the Environment | Siim Kiisler | 12 June 2017 | 29 April 2019 | Pro Patria (Estonian political party) |
Ministry of Social Affairs
| Minister of Social Protection | Kaia Iva | 23 November 2016 | 29 April 2019 | Pro Patria (Estonian political party) |
| Minister of Health and Labour | Jevgeni Ossinovski | 14 September 2015 | 2 May 2018 | SDE |
| Minister of Health and Labour | Riina Sikkut | 2 May 2018 | 29 April 2019 | SDE |
Ministry of Rural Affairs
| Minister of Rural Affairs | Martin Repinski | 23 November 2016 | 9 December 2016 | Centre |
| Minister of Rural Affairs | Tarmo Tamm | 12 December 2016 | 29 April 2019 | Centre |

== Resignations and changes ==
On 6 December 2016, Minister of Rural Affairs, Martin Repinski, resigned due to massive media criticism of the questionable business practices of his goat farm. Centre Party decided to nominate Tarmo Tamm as his successor.

On 24 May 2017, Minister of Public Administration, Mihhail Korb, resigned, in the interests of the health of the coalition, after the scandal that erupted following his comment on his lack of support for Estonia's NATO membership. He was replaced with Jaak Aab. Aab himself resigned on 17 April 2018 after being caught by Police speeding (73 km/h in 50 km/h zone) and driving under the influence (blood alcohol level 0.28‰) and was replaced with Janek Mäggi, until then non-partisan public relations specialist.

On 7 June 2017, following the change of party leadership, Pro Patria and Res Publica Union, decided to replace three of it ministers in the Cabinet.

- Siim Kiisler replaced Marko Pomerants as Minister of the Environment.
- Toomas Tõniste replaced Sven Sester as Minister of Finance.
- Jüri Luik replaced Margus Tsahkna as Minister of Defence.

On 7 April 2018, Minister of Health and Labour, Jevgeni Ossinovski, announced his intention to resign in order to focus on leading the Social Democratic party to the March 2019 elections. He was replaced with Riina Sikkut.

On 23 July 2018, Minister of Entrepreneurship, Urve Palo, announced her resignation and that she had also quit Social Democratic Party. She was replaced with Rene Tammist.

On 20 November 2018, Minister of the Interior, Andres Anvelt, announced that he would resign and leave politics for health reasons. He was replaced by Katri Raik on November 26.

| Preceded by Taavi Rõivas's second cabinet | Government of Estonia; 2016–2019 | Succeeded by Jüri Ratas's second cabinet |
