= Jürgen Ligi =

Estonian politician (born 1959)

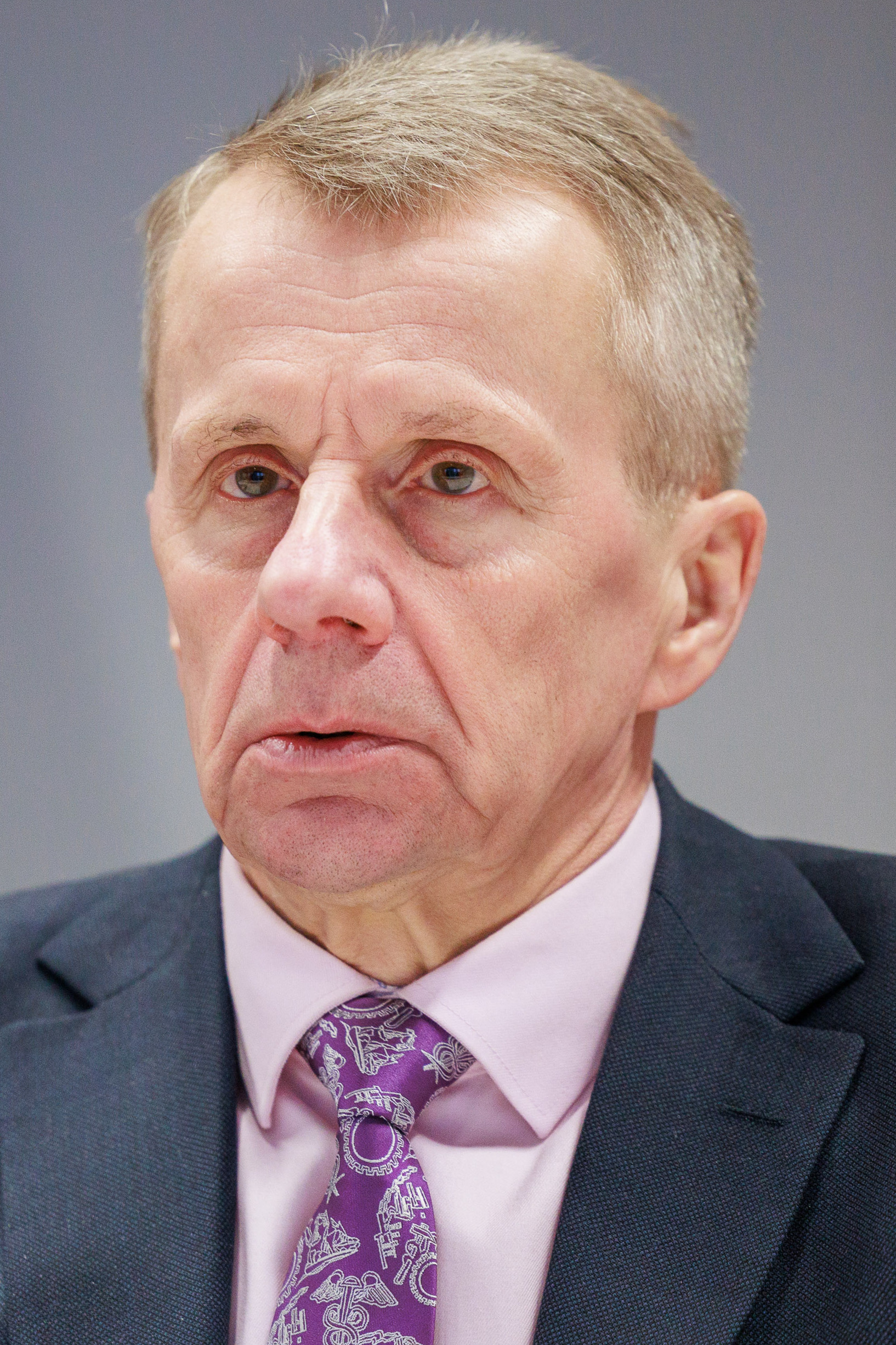
- Ligi in 2025

Minister of Finance
- Incumbent
- Assumed office 23 July 2024
- Prime Minister: Kristen Michal
- Preceded by: Mart Võrklaev
- In office 3 June 2009 – 3 November 2014
- Prime Minister: Andrus Ansip; Taavi Rõivas
- Preceded by: Ivari Padar
- Succeeded by: Maris Lauri

Minister of Foreign Affairs
- In office 12 September 2016 – 23 November 2016
- Prime Minister: Taavi Rõivas
- Preceded by: Marina Kaljurand
- Succeeded by: Sven Mikser

Minister of Education and Research
- In office 9 April 2015 – 12 September 2016
- Prime Minister: Taavi Rõivas
- Preceded by: Jevgeni Ossinovski
- Succeeded by: Maris Lauri

Minister of Defence
- In office 10 October 2005 – 5 April 2007
- Prime Minister: Andrus Ansip
- Preceded by: Jaak Jõerüüt
- Succeeded by: Jaak Aaviksoo

Personal details
- Born: 16 July 1959 (age 67) Tartu, then part of Estonian SSR, Soviet Union
- Party: Reform Party
- Children: 2
- Education: University of Tartu

Jürgen Ligi (born 16 July 1959) is an Estonian politician, former Minister of Foreign Affairs, and a member and the vice-chairman of the liberal Reform Party. He was Minister of Education and Research in Taavi Rõivas' cabinet from 9 April 2015 to 12 September 2016. Previously, Ligi has served as the Minister of Defence from 2005 to 2007 and as the Minister of Finance from 2009 to 2014.

== Early life ==
After graduating from Tartu Second Gymnasium in 1977, he studied geography and foreign economics at the University of Tartu. He also graduated from the Estonian Business School. Ligi has been the Head of the Kuressaare Branch of the EVEA Pank, the Economic Advisor and Business Consultant to the Kaarma Parish Rural Municipality Government, the Head of the Kuressaare Regional Office of the Estonian Chamber of Commerce and Industry, the Chief Specialist of the Saaremaa Agro-industrial Association, and the Economist of the Planning Institute of the National Planning Committee.

== Political career ==
=== Member of Parliament ===
Ligi was member of the Riigikogu from 1995 to 2005, from 2007 to 2009 and from 2014 to 2015.

=== Minister of Defence ===
From 2005 to 2007, Jürgen Ligi was the Minister of Defence.

=== Minister of Finance ===
On 3 June 2009, he was nominated Minister of Finance and sworn in a day later. In October 2014, Ligi raised controversy by bringing up the ethnicity of the Minister of Education and Research Jevgeni Ossinovski. Ligi later apologized, but was pressured to resign from his post.

=== Minister of Education and Research ===
On 9 April 2015, Ligi became the Minister of Education and Research in Taavi Rõivas' second cabinet.

=== Minister of Foreign Affairs ===
On 12 September 2016, Ligi was nominated Minister of Foreign Affairs, after the former Minister Marina Kaljurand had decided to step down and run for president.

== Personal life ==
Jürgen Ligi is the son of archaeologist Herbert Ligi. Jürgen's mother Reet's father was archaeologist Harri Moora. His brother Priit Ligi was also an archaeologist; he died on the cruise ferry MS Estonia that sank in 1994. Jürgen's sister Katre is married to poet Hando Runnel. He is also related to poet Juhan Viiding and politician Indrek Tarand. Jürgen Ligi himself is married and has two sons.

Political offices
Preceded by Jaak Jõerüüt	Minister of Defence; 2005–2007	Succeeded by Jaak Aaviksoo
Preceded by Helir-Valdor Seeder; Acting	Minister of Finance; 2009–2014	Succeeded by Maris Lauri
Preceded by Jevgeni Ossinovski	Minister of Education and Research; 2015–2016	Succeeded by Maris Lauri
Preceded by Marina Kaljurand	Minister of Foreign Affairs; 2016	Succeeded by Sven Mikser
