= Liisa Oviir =

Estonian politician

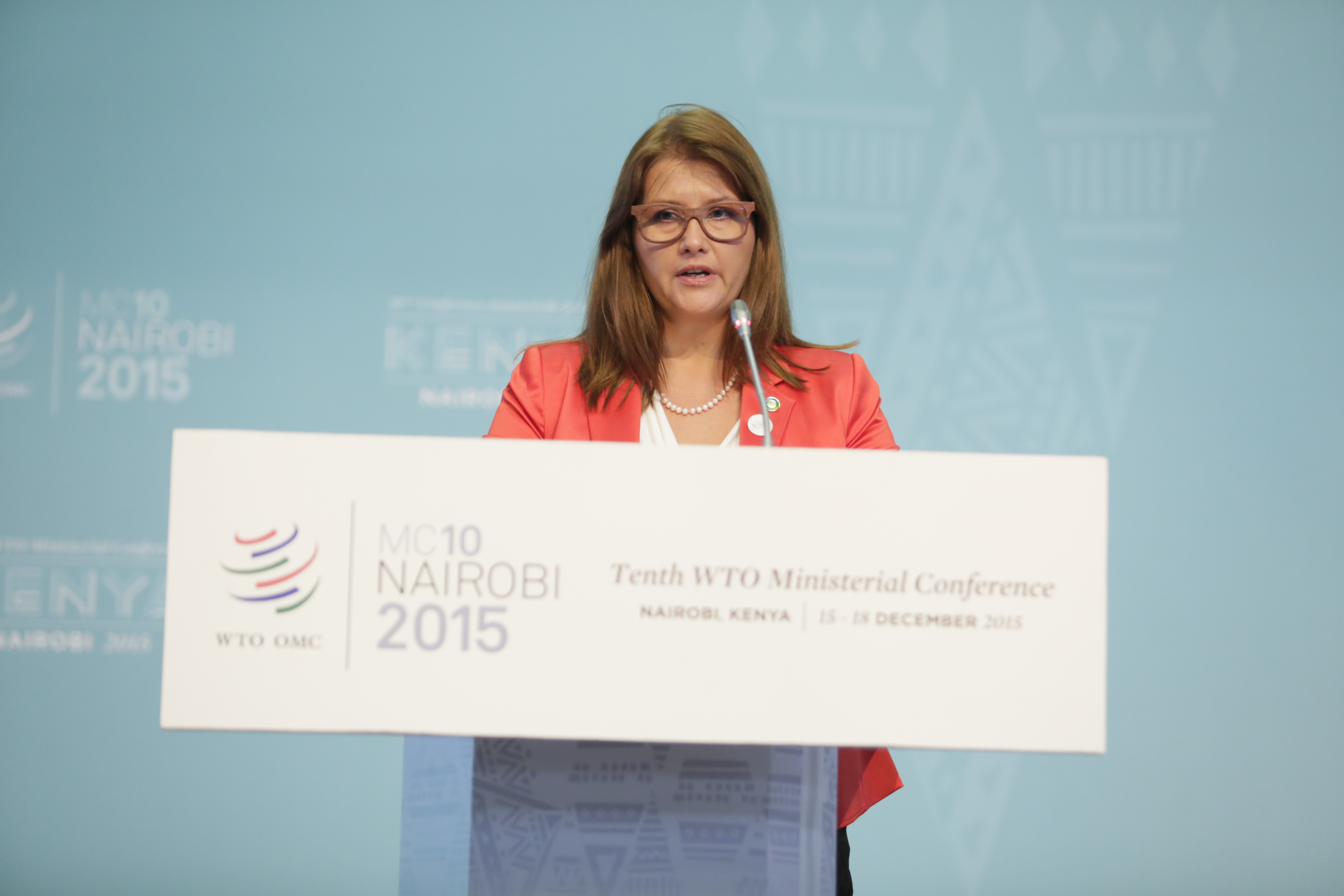

Minister of Entrepreneurship
- In office 14 September 2015 – 23 November 2016
- Prime Minister: Taavi Rõivas
- Preceded by: Urve Palo
- Succeeded by: Urve Palo (as Minister of Entrepreneurship and Information Technology)

Personal details
- Born: 1 March 1977 (age 49) Tallinn, then part of Estonian SSR, Soviet Union
- Party: Social Democratic Party
- Education: University of Tartu

Liisa Oviir (born 1 March 1977) is an Estonian lawyer and politician who was Estonia's Minister of Entrepreneurship from 2015 to 2016.

== Early life ==
Liisa Oviir is the mother of two sons. She has been divorced from her husband since 2010. Her father is lawyer and civil servant Mihkel Oviir and her mother is politician Siiri Oviir. Her great-grandfather was pastor Madis Oviir.

== Career ==
From 1997–1998, Liisa Oviir served as a referent in the Estonian Embassy in London. Oviir graduated from the Faculty of Law of the University of Tartu in 2000. She worked as a lawyer for Tallink from 1998 to 2008 and Eesti Energia from 2008 to 2015.

On 14 September 2015, Oviir became the Minister of Entrepreneurship in Taavi Rõivas' second cabinet. She is a member of the Social Democratic Party.

Political offices
Preceded by Urve Palo	Minister of Entrepreneurship; 2015–2016	Succeeded by Urve Palo
