= Margus Tsahkna =

Estonian politician (born 1977)

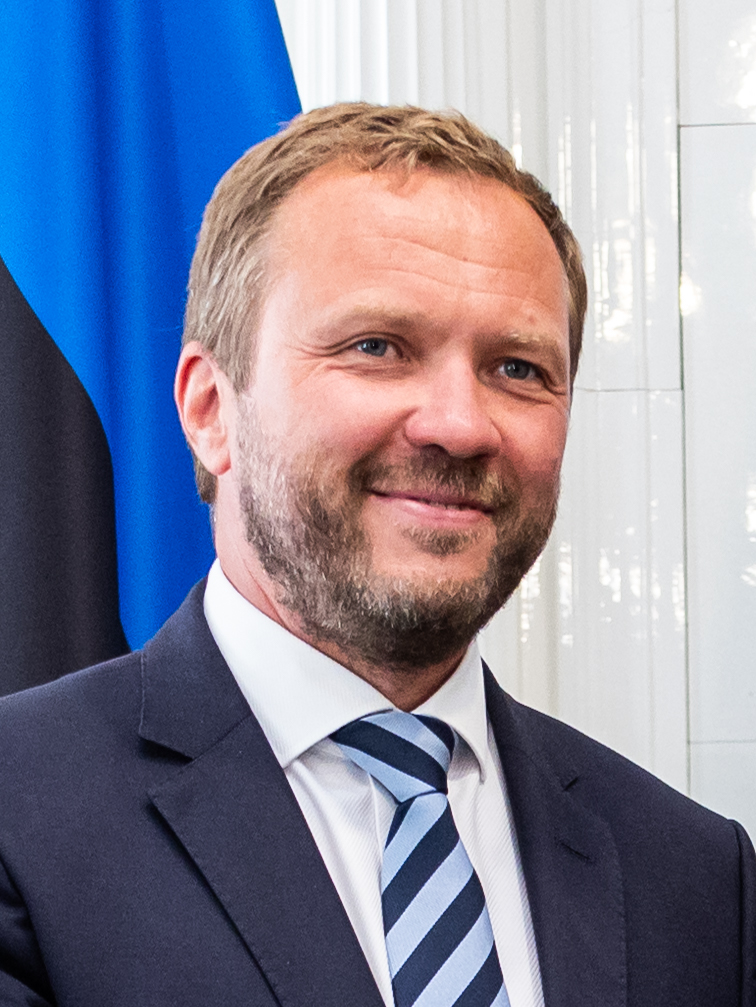
- Tsahkna in 2024

Minister of Foreign Affairs
- Incumbent
- Assumed office 17 April 2023
- Prime Minister: Kaja Kallas; Kristen Michal
- Preceded by: Urmas Reinsalu

Minister of Defence
- In office 23 November 2016 – 12 June 2017
- Prime Minister: Jüri Ratas
- Preceded by: Hannes Hanso
- Succeeded by: Jüri Luik

Minister of Social Protection
- In office 9 April 2015 – 23 November 2016
- Prime Minister: Taavi Rõivas
- Preceded by: Helmen Kütt
- Succeeded by: Kaia Iva

Leader of the Union of Pro Patria and Res Publica
- In office 6 June 2015 – 13 May 2017
- Preceded by: Urmas Reinsalu
- Succeeded by: Helir-Valdor Seeder

Leader of Eesti 200
- In office 19 November 2023 – 31 August 2024
- Preceded by: Lauri Hussar
- Succeeded by: Kristina Kallas

Personal details
- Born: 13 April 1977 (age 49) Tartu, then part of Estonian SSR, Soviet Union
- Party: Eesti 200 (2018–present)
- Other political affiliations: Pro Patria and Res Publica Union (2000–2017)
- Spouse: Anna-Greta Tsahkna
- Children: 4

Margus Tsahkna (born 13 April 1977) is an Estonian politician. He has been Minister of Foreign Affairs since the third cabinet of Kaja Kallas was sworn in on 17 April 2023 and continues in that role in Kristen Michal's cabinet. He was also the leader of the Estonia 200 party from 19 November 2023 to 31 August 2024.

Previously, he was the leader of the conservative Isamaa party, Minister of Defence in Jüri Ratas' cabinet and Minister of Social Protection in Taavi Rõivas' second cabinet.

== Early life ==
Tsahkna was born in Tartu, Estonia. In 1995, he graduated from a secondary school. From 1996 to 2002, he studied theology and law at the University of Tartu, without graduating. Between 1999 and 2000 he also studied international law at the University of Toronto, without graduating.

== Political career ==
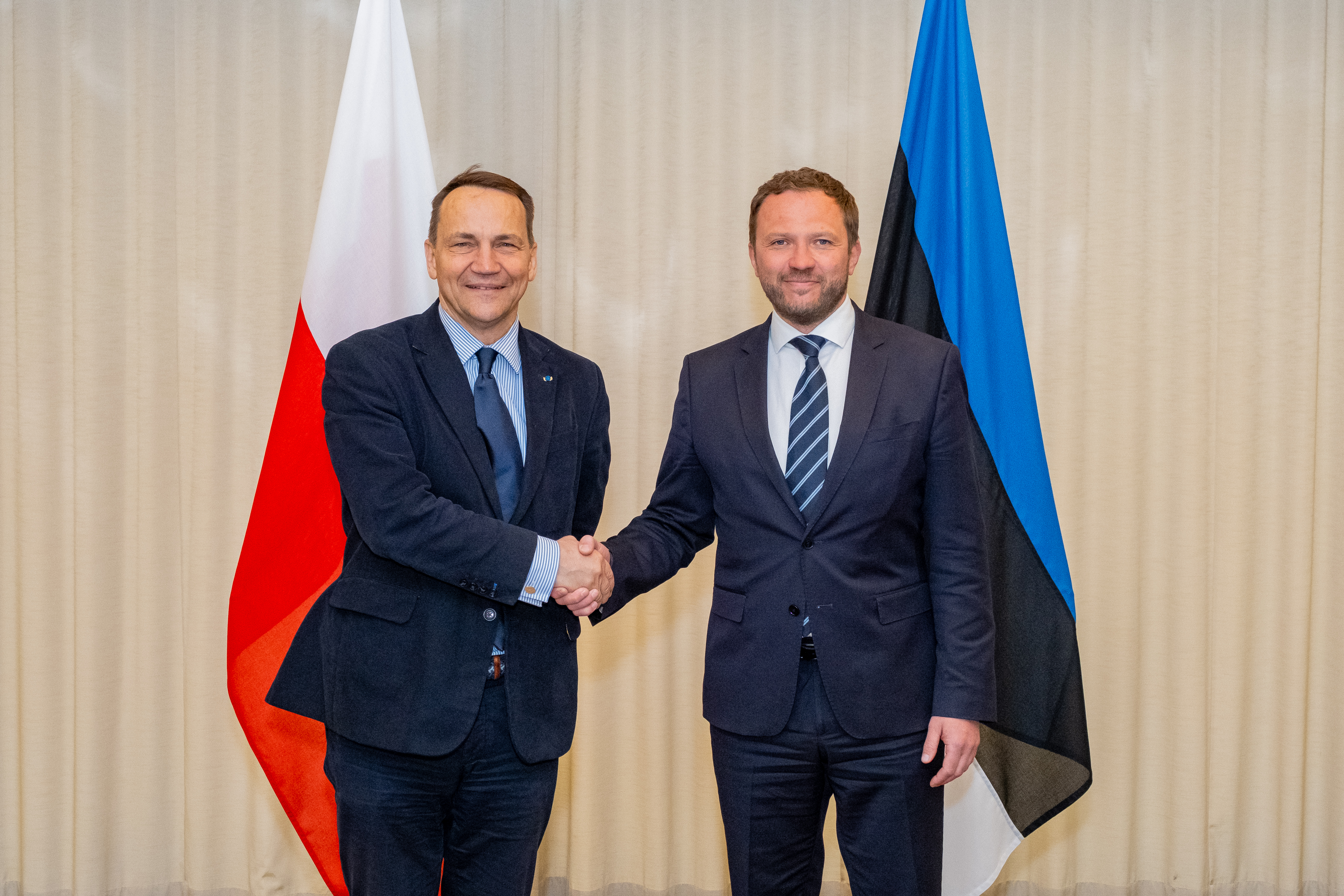
Minister Tsahkna and Polish Foreign Minister Radosław Sikorski, May 2024

In 2000, he joined the Pro Patria party. From 2001 to 2004 he was chairman of Noor-Isamaa, the party's youth organisation. From 2001 to 2003 he was a member of Tartu city council. From 2003 to 2006 he was the party's political secretary. After the affiliation of the Pro Patria and Res Publica parties, to form the Pro Patria ja Res Publica Liit party, he was secretary general from 2007 to 2010, and political secretary from 2010 to 2013. In 2013, he became assistant chairman. He has been a member of the Estonian parliament since 2007, the member of the parliaments finance committee and social committee. He has also acted as a chairman of the parliaments social committee from 2011 to 2014.

In the 2015 parliamentary election, Tsahkna was re-elected to the parliament with 2,267 individual votes. He was chosen the chairman of the Pro Patria and Res Publica Union on 6 June 2015.

In April 2017, Tsahkna announced that he would not seek re-election as chairman. He was followed by Helir-Valdor Seeder on 13 May 2017. Tsahkna left the party on 26 June 2017. In 2018 he left Isamaa and joined Estonia 200.

As the defence minister and a member of the Riigikogu, Tsahkna promoted the interests of the defence industry. During a break in his political career, he became an export manager of medical device manufacturer Semetron, owned by an Estonian tycoon Margus Linnamäe, and a shareholder of MM Hospital OÜ (a company co-owned by Linnamäe and affiliated with Semetron's field hospital business).

The investigation by Eesti Ekspress highlighted that while working in the private sector, Tsahkna organized deals and visits with the support of the Estonian Ministry of Foreign Affairs. Following the 2022 Russian invasion of Ukraine, Tsahkna (appointed as foreign minister in 2023) ultimately benefited from deals between Estonia and other counties to provide Ukraine with container field hospitals produced exclusively by Semetron. By mid-2023, these contracts totaled 28.3 million euros, with future procurement for 150 million euros announced by Estonia and Lithuania.

Tsahkna denied an alleged conflict of interest. In August 2023, he sold his share in MM Hospital OÜ to Semetron.

== Personal life ==
Tsahkna is married to Anna-Greta Tsahkna and they have four children. He speaks Estonian, fluent English, and some Russian.

He's a half-brother of Anders Tsahkna, a former deputy mayor of Tallinn and former adviser to the minister of social affairs, tied up in several influence peddling charges.

In 2000, he founded the Christian Adolescent Home in Tartu.

He is a member of the General Johan Laidoner Society and of the Korp! Sakala student society.

In 2009, he won second place in the Estonian television singing competition Laulud tähtedega ("Singing with Stars"). He sang with Birgit Õigemeel, winner of the Eesti otsib superstaari.

== Honours ==
- Ukraine Order of Merit, II class (2025)

Political offices
Preceded by Helmen Kütt	Minister of Social Protection; 2015–2016	Succeeded by Kaia Iva
Preceded by Hannes Hanso	Minister of Defence; 2016–2017	Succeeded by Jüri Luik
Preceded by Urmas Reinsalu	Minister of Foreign Affairs; 2023–present	Incumbent
