= Anne Sulling =

Estonian politician (born 1976)

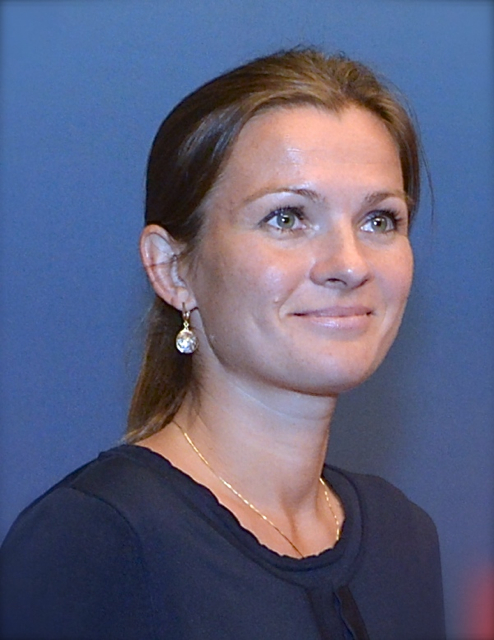

Minister of Foreign Trade and Entrepreneurship
- In office 26 March 2014 – 9 April 2015
- Prime Minister: Taavi Rõivas
- Preceded by: Post created
- Succeeded by: Urve Palo (Entrepreneurship)

Personal details
- Born: 12 October 1976 (age 49) Tartu, then part of Estonian SSR, Soviet Union
- Party: Reform Party

Anne Sulling (born 12 October 1976 in Tartu) is an Estonian politician and a member of the Riigikogu. She represents the Tartu constituency as a member of the Estonian Reform Party.

Between 2005 and 2006, Sulling worked for the Ministry of Finance on the Estonia's euro transition project. Between 2009 and 2014, Sulling was an adviser to the Prime Minister Andrus Ansip in matters related to macro-economics, the euro and the CO_{2} quota trade. She was named the “Person of the Year” by Postimees in 2011, for her work concerning CO_{2} quota sales.

In March 2014, Sulling was named Minister of Foreign Trade and Entrepreneurship in Taavi Rõivas' first cabinet. In the 2015 parliamentary election, Sulling was elected to the Riigikogu with 4,197 votes.
