= Urve Palo =

Estonian politician

Urve Paris Palo
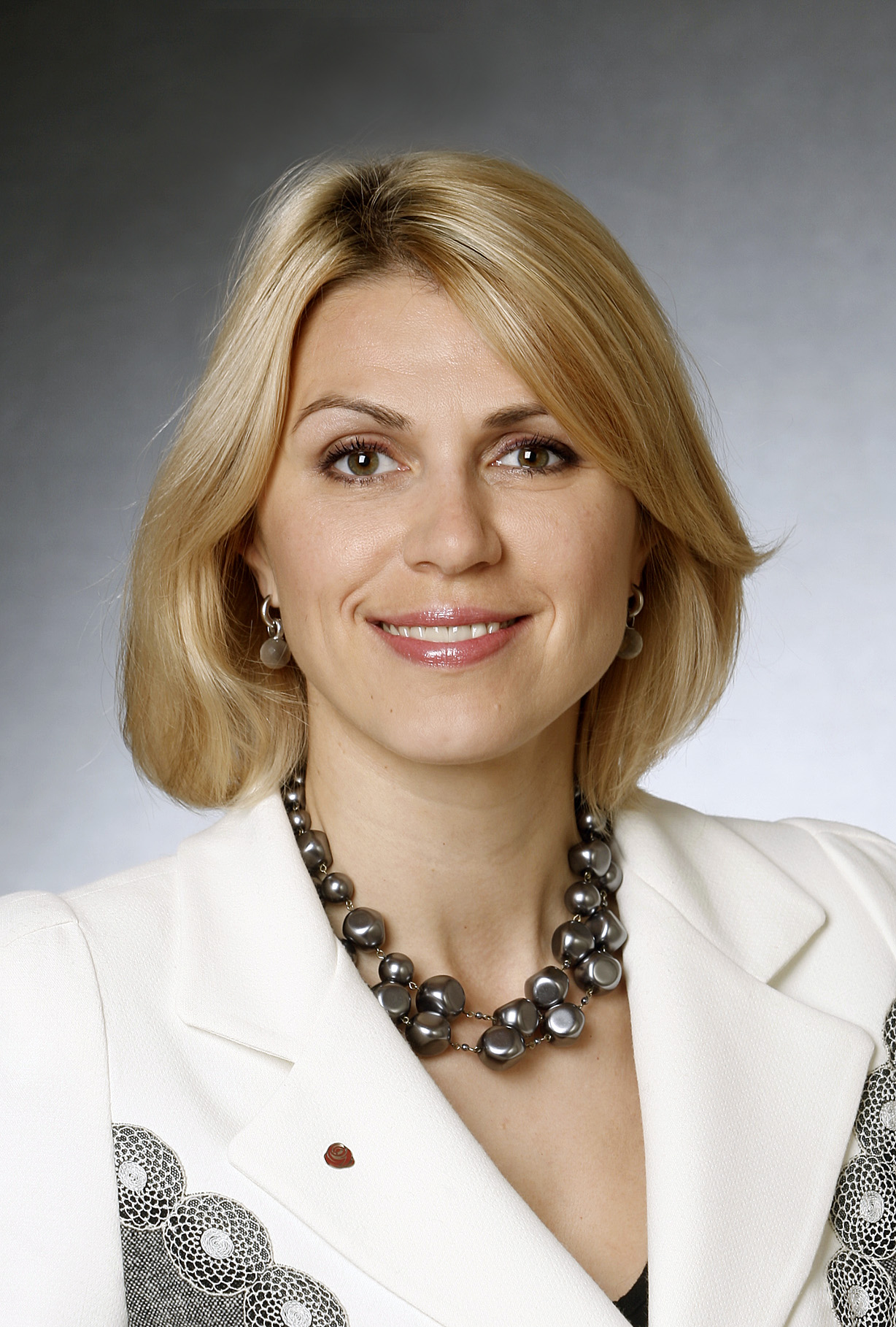

Minister of Entrepreneurship and Information Technology
- In office 23 November 2016 – 22 August 2018
- Prime Minister: Jüri Ratas
- Preceded by: Liisa Oviir (Minister of Entrepreneurship)
- Succeeded by: Rene Tammist

Minister of Entrepreneurship
- In office 9 April 2015 – 14 September 2015
- Prime Minister: Taavi Rõivas
- Preceded by: Anne Sulling (Foreign Trade and Entrepreneurship)
- Succeeded by: Liisa Oviir

Minister of Economic Affairs and Infrastructure
- In office 26 March 2014 – 9 April 2015
- Prime Minister: Taavi Rõivas
- Preceded by: Juhan Parts
- Succeeded by: Kristen Michal

Minister of Population and Ethnic Affairs
- In office 4 April 2007 – 21 May 2009
- Prime Minister: Andrus Ansip
- Preceded by: Paul-Eerik Rummo
- Succeeded by: Office abolished

Personal details
- Born: 10 July 1972 (age 54) Haapsalu, then part of Estonian SSR, Soviet Union
- Party: Social Democratic Party (2006-)
- Spouse: Janek Palo
- Children: 2
- Education: University of Tartu

Urve Paris Palo (born 10 July 1972) is an Estonian economist and politician, a member of the Social Democratic Party.

== Biography ==
Palo was born in Haapsalu. From April 2007 until May 2009, she served as Estonian Minister of Population and Ethnic Affairs. She also served as the Minister of Entrepreneurship in Taavi Rõivas' second cabinet from 9 April 2015, but resigned on 31 August while being disappointed with the coalition with the Reform Party.

In November 2016, the coalition led by Rõivas fell apart and a new coalition was formed by the Center Party, SDE and IRL. On 23 November 2016, Palo was nominated as the Minister of Entrepreneurship and Information Technology. Palo continued in her position until July 2018, when she submitted her resignation while stating that she would leave politics at the end of her term in the Riigikogu.

In 2010, Palo participated as a celebrity contestant on the fourth season of Tantsud tähtedega, the Estonian version of Dancing with the Stars. Her professional dancing partner was Aleksandr Makarov.

Political offices
Preceded by Paul-Eerik Rummo	Minister of Population and Ethnic Affairs; 2007–2009	Succeeded by Office abolished
Preceded by Juhan Parts	Minister of Economic Affairs and Infrastructure; 2014–2015	Succeeded by Kristen Michal
Preceded by Anne Sulling	Minister of Entrepreneurship; 2015	Succeeded by Liisa Oviir
Preceded by Liisa Oviir	Minister of Entrepreneurship and Information Technology; 2016–2018	Succeeded by Rene Tammist
