= Taavi Rõivas's second cabinet =

Government of Estonia from 2015 to 2016

- 48th Cabinet of Estonia
- Date formed: 9 April 2015
- Date dissolved: 23 November 2016

People and organisations
- Head of state: Toomas Hendrik Ilves (until 10 October 2016); Kersti Kaljulaid (from 10 October 2016)
- Head of government: Taavi Rõivas
- No. of ministers: 15
- Member parties: Estonian Reform Party, Social Democratic Party, Pro Patria and Res Publica Union
- Status in legislature: Majority cabinet
- Opposition parties: Estonian Centre Party; Estonian Free Party; Conservative People's Party of Estonia

History
- Election: 2015 election
- Legislature term: 4 years
- Predecessor: Taavi Rõivas's first cabinet
- Successor: Jüri Ratas' first cabinet

Taavi Rõivas's second cabinet was the cabinet of Estonia, in office from 9 April 2015 to 23 November 2016. It was a Triple Alliance coalition cabinet of liberal centre-right Estonian Reform Party, Social Democratic Party and conservative Pro Patria and Res Publica Union.

== History ==
On 7 November 2016, the Social Democratic Party and Pro Patria and Res Publica Union announced that they were asking Prime Minister Taavi Rõivas to resign and were planning on negotiating a new majority government. The announcement came soon after the opposition had submitted a motion to express lack of confidence in Rõivas's government. SDE and IRL proceeded to support the motion, leaving the Reform the only party to support Rõivas. Rõivas commented the situation by declining to resign and arguing that a democratically elected government should be only removed by a democratic vote. In the following vote of confidence on 9 November, the majority of Riigikogu voted in favor of removing the prime minister's government. In the following coalition talks Center Party, SDE and IRL formed a new coalition led by Center Party's chairman Jüri Ratas. The new coalition was sworn in on 23 November.

== Ministers ==
Portfolio	Minister	Took office	Left office	Party
Government's Office
Prime Minister	Taavi Rõivas	26 March 2014	23 November 2016	Reform
Ministry of Finance
Minister of Finance	Sven Sester	9 April 2015	to the next cabinet	Pro Patria and Res Publica
Minister of Public Administration	Arto Aas	9 April 2015	23 November 2016	Reform
Ministry of Foreign Affairs
Minister of Foreign Affairs	Keit Pentus-Rosimannus	17 November 2014	1 July 2015	Reform
Minister of Foreign Affairs	Marina Kaljurand	16 July 2015	12 September 2016	Independent
Minister of Foreign Affairs	Jürgen Ligi	12 September 2016	23 November 2016	Reform
Ministry of Economic Affairs and Communications
Minister of Economic Affairs and Infrastructure	Kristen Michal	9 April 2015	23 November 2016	Reform
Minister of Entrepreneurship	Urve Palo	9 April 2015	30 August 2015	SDE
Minister of Entrepreneurship	Liisa Oviir	14 September 2015	23 November 2016	SDE
Ministry of Justice
Minister of Justice	Urmas Reinsalu	9 April 2015	to the next cabinet	Pro Patria and Res Publica
Ministry of Defence
Minister of Defence	Sven Mikser	26 March 2014	14 September 2015	SDE
Minister of Defence	Hannes Hanso	14 September 2015	23 November 2016	SDE
Ministry of Culture
Minister of Culture	Indrek Saar	9 April 2015	to the next cabinet	SDE
Ministry of the Interior
Minister of the Interior	Hanno Pevkur	26 March 2014	23 November 2016	Reform
Ministry of Education and Research
Minister of Education and Research	Jürgen Ligi	9 April 2015	12 September 2016	Reform
Minister of Education and Research	Maris Lauri	12 September 2016	23 November 2016	Reform
Ministry of the Environment
Minister of the Environment	Marko Pomerants	9 April 2015	to the next cabinet	Pro Patria and Res Publica
Ministry of Social Affairs
Minister of Social Protection	Margus Tsahkna	9 April 2015	23 November 2016	Pro Patria and Res Publica
Minister of Health and Labour	Rannar Vassiljev	9 April 2015	14 September 2015	SDE
Minister of Health and Labour	Jevgeni Ossinovski	14 September 2015	to the next cabinet	SDE
Ministry of Rural Affairs
Minister of Rural Affairs	Urmas Kruuse	9 April 2015	23 November 2016	Reform

== Resignations ==
On 1 July 2015 Minister of Foreign Affairs, Keit Pentus-Rosimannus, resigned due to a court decision which made her partly liable for debts accumulated by her father's bankrupt company. Reform Party decided to nominate independent Marina Kaljurand as her successor.

On 30 August 2015 The Social Democrat council vote whether to continue in the government coalition, with the result turning out positive Urve Palo, the Minister of Entrepreneurship, resigned in protest. She was replaced with Liisa Oviir. Social Democrats also decided to bring their new chairman Jevgeni Ossinovski into the government as Minister of Health and Labour. The Minister of Defence and former chairman of Social Democrats Sven Mikser was replaced with Hannes Hanso.

On 9 September 2016 Minister of Foreign Affairs, Marina Kaljurand, announced her resignation to run independently in the 2016 Estonian presidential election. She had previously been the favourite for Reform Party nominee, but was eventually dropped in favour of Siim Kallas. In a ministerial reshuffle Jürgen Ligi was moved from the chair of Minister of Education to Minister of Foreign Affairs with Maris Lauri taking his seat in the Ministry of Education and Research.

== See also ==
- Triple Alliance (Estonia)

Preceded by Taavi Rõivas's first cabinet	Government of Estonia; 2015–2016	Succeeded by Jüri Ratas' first cabinet
