= Ülle Lichtfeldt =

Estonian actress

Ülle Lichtfeldt (born 4 August 1970) is an Estonian actress.

Since 1995 she has worked at Rakvere Theatre. Besides theatre roles she has also appeared in films and television series.

Lichtfeldt is married to actor and politician Indrek Saar.

== Selected filmography ==
- 1997 Minu Leninid (feature film; role: ?)
- 1999-... Õnne 13 (television series; role: Are Prillop)
- 2006 Kuldrannake (feature film; role: Angela)
- 2008 Tuulepealne maa (television mini-series; role: Maria Kallaste)
- 2013 Elavad pildid (feature film; role: Notary)
- 2014-2015 Viimane võmm (television series; role: Tanja Murrik)
- 2015 Klassikokkutulek (feature film; role: Eva)
- 2016 Siberi võmm (television series; role: Tanja Murrik)
