= Rene Tammist =

Estonian politician

Minister of Entrepreneurship and Information Technology
- Incumbent
- Assumed office 22 August 2018
- Prime Minister: Jüri Ratas
- Preceded by: Urve Palo

Personal details
- Born: 5 July 1978 (age 47) Tartu, then part of Estonian SSR, Soviet Union
- Party: Social Democratic Party

Rene Tammist (born 5 July 1978) is an Estonian politician representing the Social Democratic Party (SDE). He was sworn is as the Minister of Entrepreneurship and Information Technology in the cabinet of Jüri Ratas on 22 August 2018, succeeding Urve Palo, who resigned from the post.

== Background ==
Before entering the politics, Tammist served as director of the Estonian Renewable Energy Association, a member of the Board of the European Agency for the Cooperation of Energy Regulators and adviser to the S&D Group in the European Parliament's Industry, Research and Energy Committee.
