= Meelis Atonen =

Estonian politician

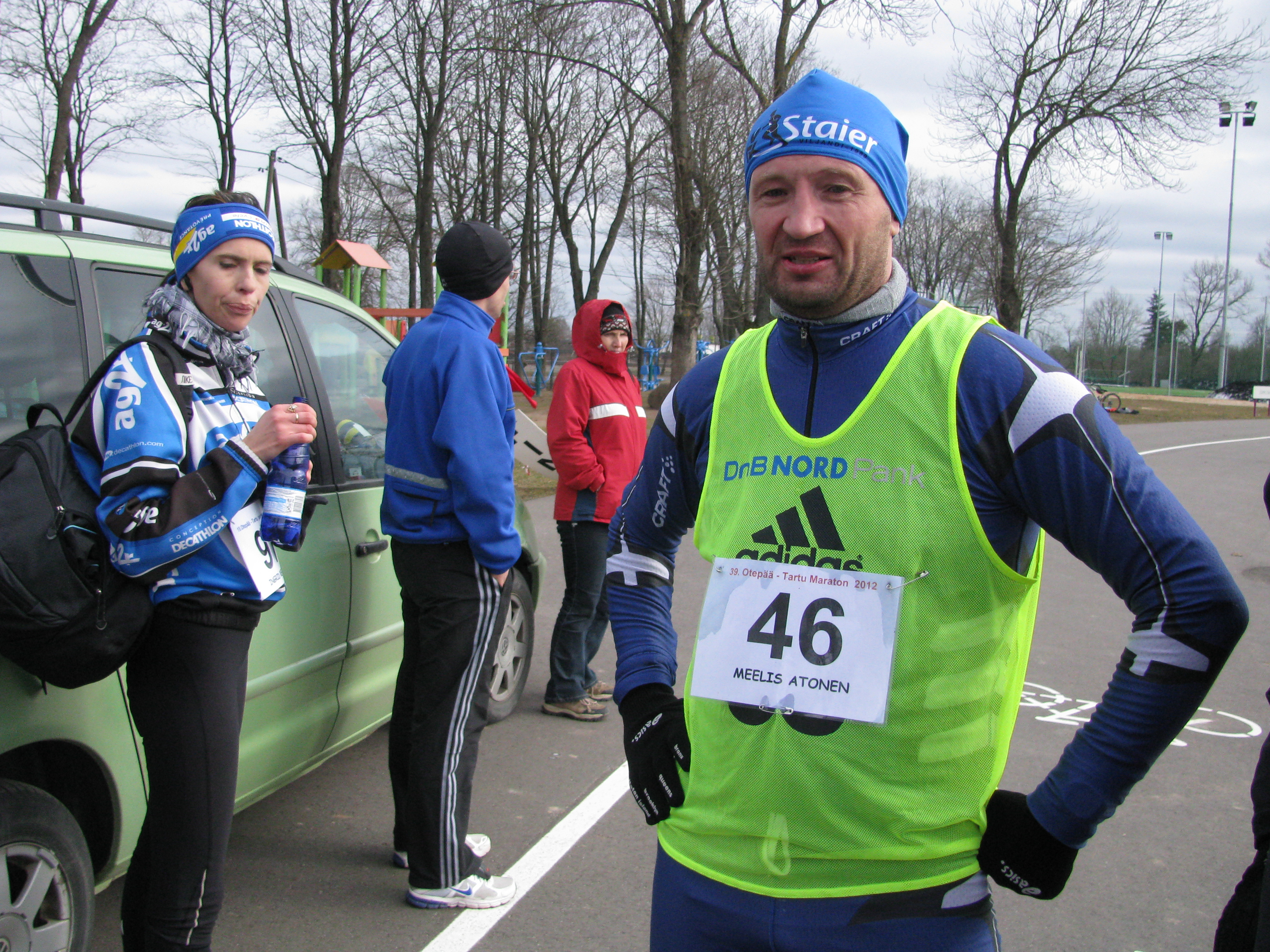
Meelis Atonen at the Otepää-Tartu marathon in 2012.

Meelis Atonen (born 5 December 1966 in Viljandi) is an Estonian politician and entrepreneur. He has been a member of the IX, X and XI Riigikogu representing the Estonian Reform Party. In 2003–2004, he was Minister of Economic Affairs and Communications.
