= Sven Mikser =

Estonian politician (born 1973)

Sven Mikser MEP
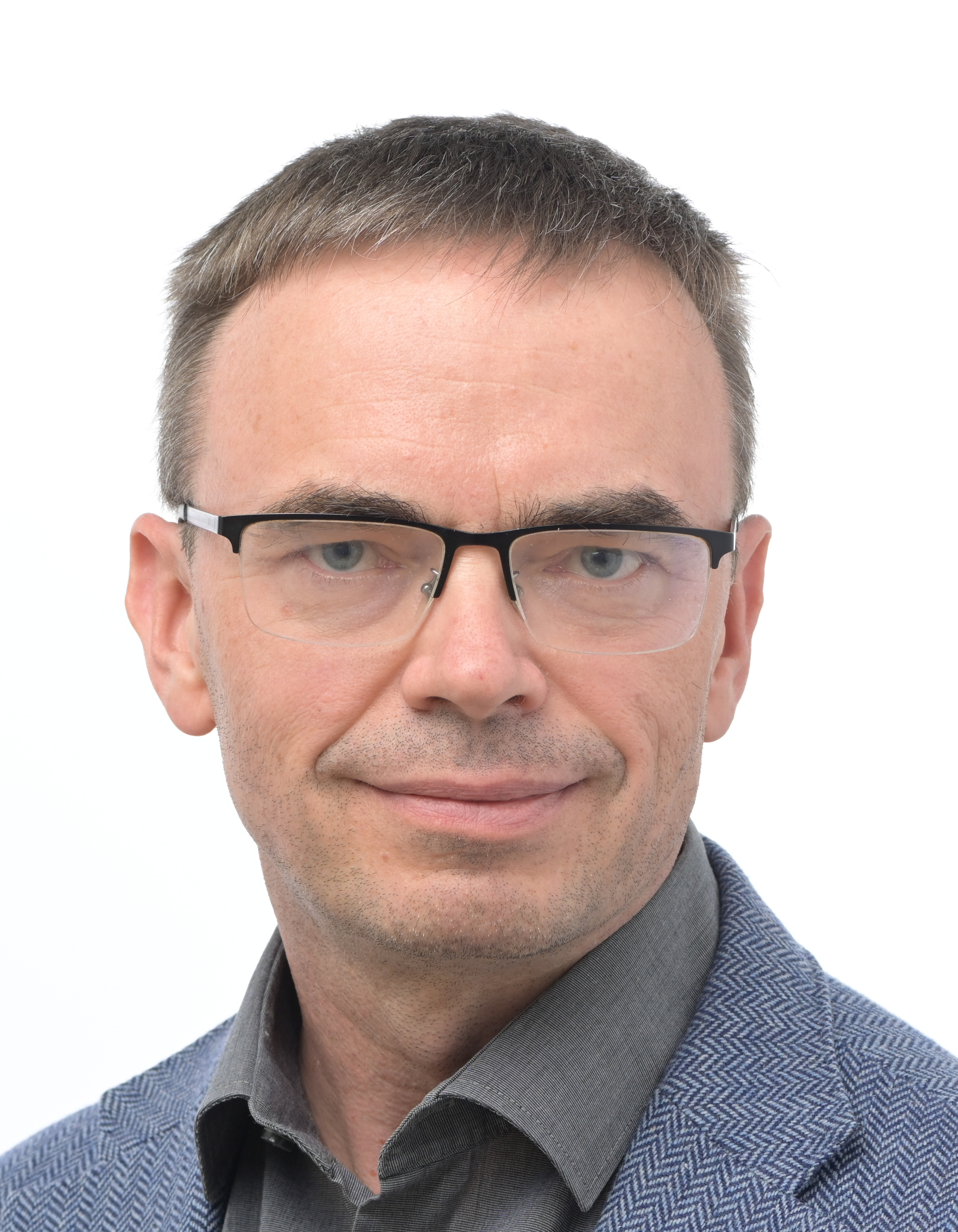
- Mikser in 2024

Member of the European Parliament for Estonia
- Incumbent
- Assumed office 2 July 2019

Minister of Foreign Affairs
- In office 23 November 2016 – 29 April 2019
- Prime Minister: Jüri Ratas
- Preceded by: Jürgen Ligi
- Succeeded by: Urmas Reinsalu

Minister of Defence
- In office 26 March 2014 – 14 September 2015
- Prime Minister: Taavi Rõivas
- Preceded by: Urmas Reinsalu
- Succeeded by: Hannes Hanso
- In office 28 January 2002 – 10 April 2003
- Prime Minister: Siim Kallas
- Preceded by: Jüri Luik
- Succeeded by: Margus Hanson

Leader of the Social Democratic Party
- In office 16 October 2010 – 30 May 2015
- Preceded by: Jüri Pihl
- Succeeded by: Jevgeni Ossinovski

Personal details
- Born: 8 November 1973 (age 52) Tartu, then part of Estonian SSR, Soviet Union
- Party: Centre Party (Before 2005); Social Democratic Party (2005–present)
- Education: University of Tartu
- Website: Official website

Sven Mikser (born 8 November 1973) is an Estonian politician. A member of the Social Democratic Party, he has served as a member of the European Parliament for Estonia since 2019. He previously served as minister of foreign affairs between 2016 and 2019 and minister of defence on two occasions. He also led his party between 2010 and 2015.

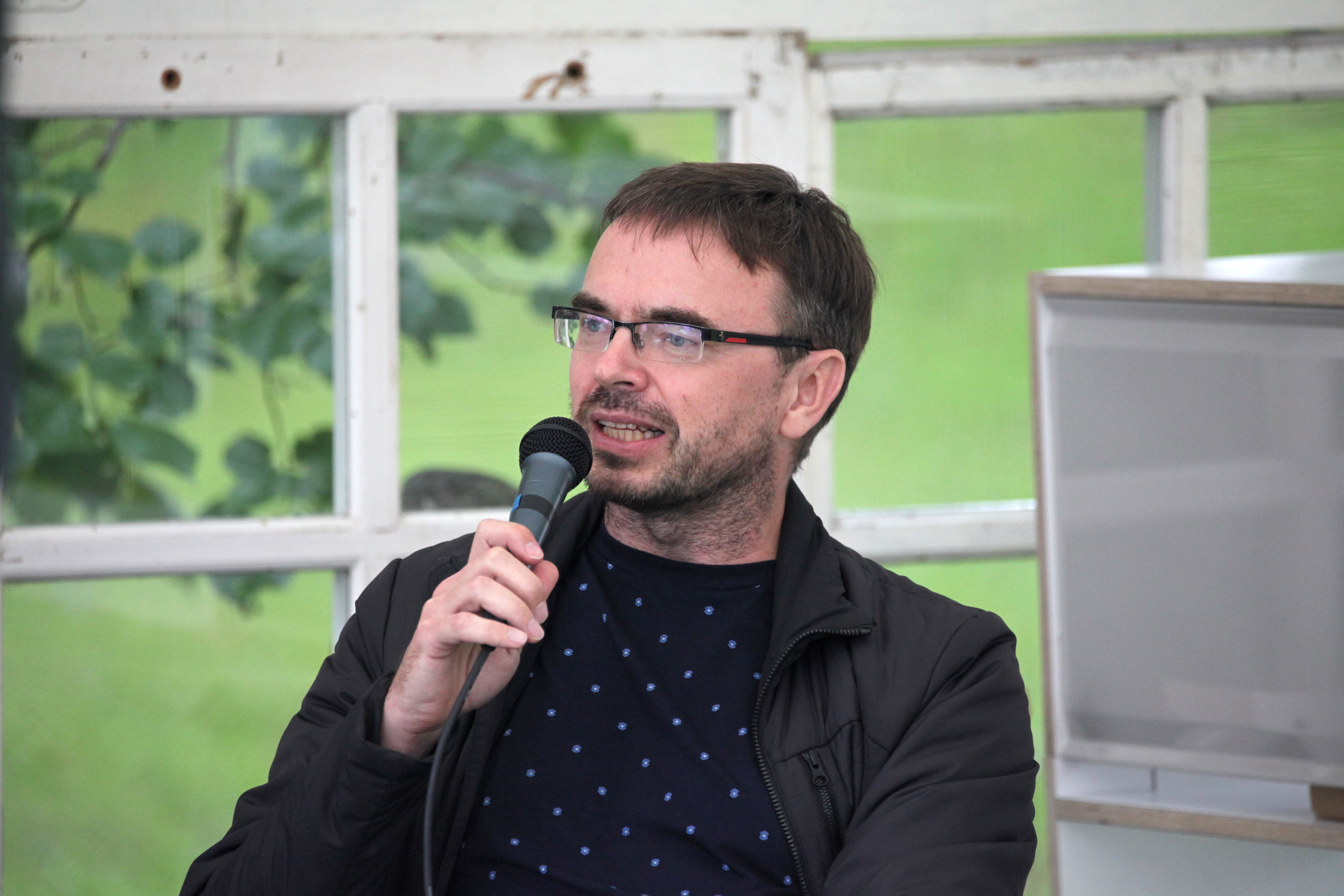
Sven Mikser at the Opinion Festival 2021 in Paide, Estonia

== Career ==
As a member of the Estonian Centre Party from 2002 to 2003, Mikser served as the Minister of Defence in Siim Kallas' cabinet.

Mikser was the leader of the Social Democratic Party between 16 October 2010 and 30 May 2015. He has been the Minister of Defence since 26 March 2014 in Taavi Rõivas' first and second cabinets. On 23 November 2016, he assumed the position of Minister of Foreign Affairs in the cabinet of Jüri Ratas.

Mikser was elected as a Member of the European Parliament in 2019. He has since been serving on the Committee on Foreign Affairs and its Subcommittee on Security and Defence. In addition to his committee assignments, he is part of the Parliament's delegation to the Euronest Parliamentary Assembly and the NATO Parliamentary Assembly.

== See also ==
- List of foreign ministers in 2017
- List of current foreign ministers

Political offices
Preceded by Jüri Luik	Minister of Defence; 2002–2003	Succeeded by Margus Hanson
Preceded by Urmas Reinsalu	Minister of Defence; 2014–2015	Succeeded by Hannes Hanso
Preceded by Jürgen Ligi	Minister of Foreign Affairs; 2016–2019	Succeeded by Urmas Reinsalu
Party political offices
Preceded by Jüri Pihl	Leader of the Social Democratic Party; 2010–2015	Succeeded by Jevgeni Ossinovski
