= Hanno Pevkur =

Estonian politician (born 1977)

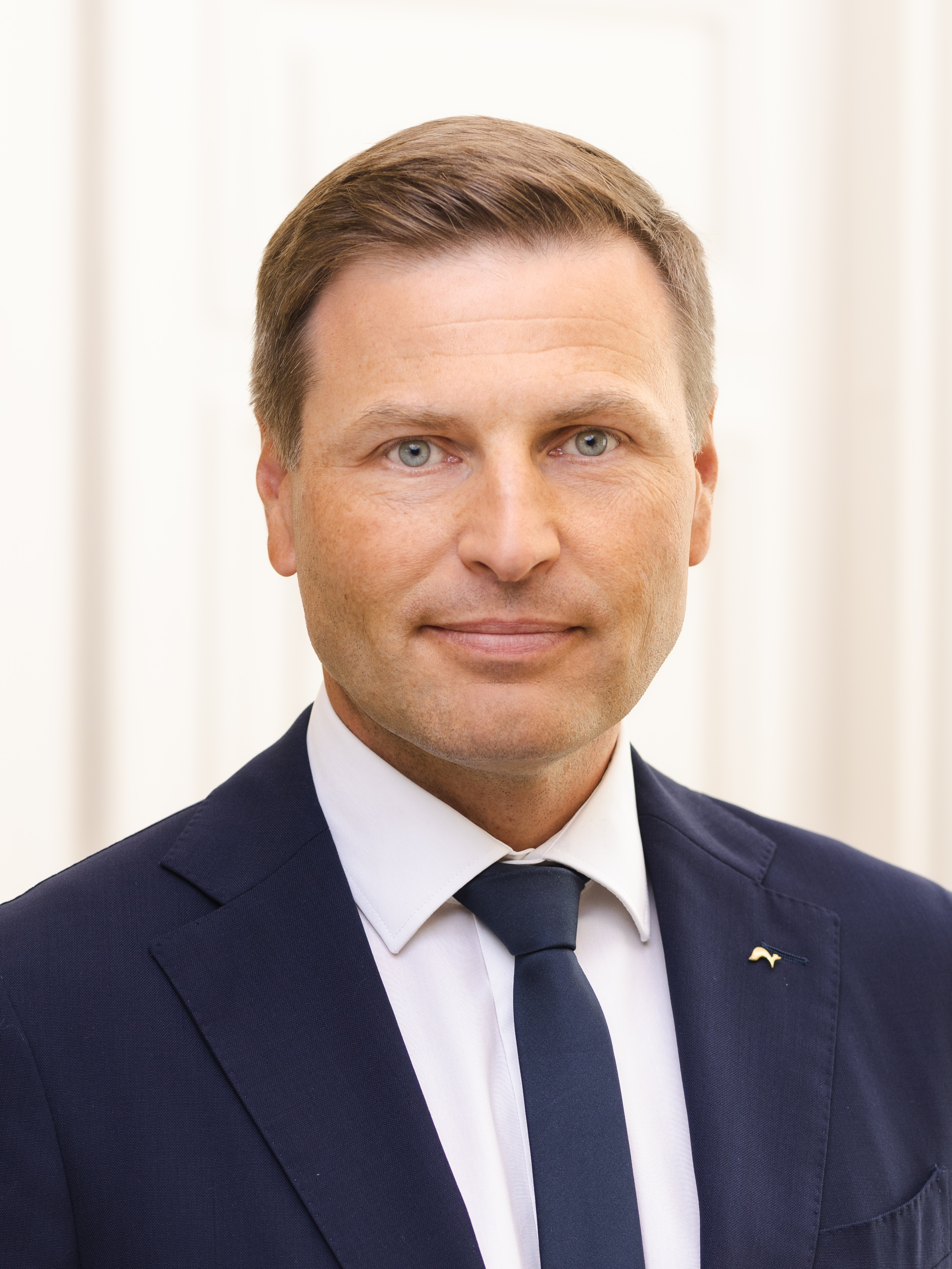
- Pevkur in 2022

Minister of Defence
- In office 18 July 2022 – 16 September 2026
- Prime Minister: Kaja Kallas; Kristen Michal
- Preceded by: Kalle Laanet
- Succeeded by: Martin Herem

Minister of the Interior
- In office 26 March 2014 – 23 November 2016
- Prime Minister: Taavi Rõivas
- Preceded by: Ken-Marti Vaher
- Succeeded by: Andres Anvelt

Minister of Justice
- In office 10 December 2012 – 26 March 2014
- Prime Minister: Andrus Ansip
- Preceded by: Kristen Michal
- Succeeded by: Andres Anvelt

Minister of Social Affairs
- In office 23 February 2009 – 10 December 2012
- Prime Minister: Andrus Ansip
- Preceded by: Maret Maripuu
- Succeeded by: Taavi Rõivas

Member of the Riigikogu
- In office 23 November 2016 – 18 July 2022
- In office 4 March 2007 – 23 February 2009
- Incumbent
- Assumed office 16 September 2026

Personal details
- Born: 2 April 1977 (age 49) Iisaku, then part of Estonian SSR, Soviet Union
- Party: Estonian Reform
- Spouse: Helin Pevkur
- Children: 2
- Education: University of Tartu

Hanno Pevkur (born 2 April 1977) is an Estonian politician who served as Minister of Defence from 2022 to 2026. He is the former chairman of the Estonian Reform Party.

He served as the Minister of Social Affairs from 2009 to 2012, as the Minister of Justice from 2012 to 2014 and as the Minister of the Interior from 2014 to 2016.

== Early life ==
Pevkur graduated from Järva-Jaani Secondary School and studied law at the Tallinn School of Economics, and at the University of Tartu. Until 2000, Pevkur worked as a lawyer.

== Political career ==
From 2000 to 2005, Pevkur worked in the Nõmme City District Government, first as Administrative Secretary and later as Head of City District. From 2005 to 2007, he was on the Tallinn City Council and served as an adviser to the Minister of Justice. From 2007 to 2009, Pevkur was a member of the 11th Riigikogu and also a member of the Nõmme Administrative Council.

On 23 February 2009, Pevkur replaced Maret Maripuu as the Minister of Social Affairs, after Maripuu decided to step down due to a scandal caused by the Ministry's inability to ensure home delivery of pensions and timely welfare payments.

On 10 December 2012, Pevkur was appointed as the Minister of Justice.

From 2014 to 2016, Pevkur was the Minister of the Interior in Taavi Rõivas' first and second cabinets.

On 23 October 2017, Pevkur was elected as a deputy speaker of the Riigikogu to replace Taavi Rõivas, who had resigned following a sexual harassment scandal.

On 13 December 2017, Pevkur announced that he would not run for the chairmanship of the Reform Party in January 2018.

Pevkur was selected as the Defence Minister as part of the coalition government under Prime Minister Kaja Kallas following her removal of the junior coalition partner, the Estonian Centre Party in June 2022. The new coalition government was sworn in on 18 July 2022. Pevkur on 2 September 2026 announced his resignation over a €70 million scandal for purchasing artillery shells for Ukraine through European Peace Facility funding. The contract was awarded to Datasel SRL, an Indian-owned Italy-based company with no history of producing artillery shells, and the shells that were delivered were allegedly found to be faulty.

== Personal life ==
Hanno Pevkur is married and has two children – a son and a daughter. In addition to his native Estonian, he speaks Russian, English, German and Finnish.

Political offices
Preceded by Maret Maripuu	Minister of Social Affairs; 2009–2012	Succeeded by Taavi Rõivas
Preceded by Kristen Michal	Minister of Justice; 2012–2014	Succeeded by Andres Anvelt
Preceded by Ken-Marti Vaher	Minister of the Interior; 2014–2016	Succeeded by Andres Anvelt
Preceded by Kalle Laanet	Minister of Defence; 2022–present	Incumbent
