= Andrus Ansip =

Estonian politician (born 1956)

Andrus Ansip MEP
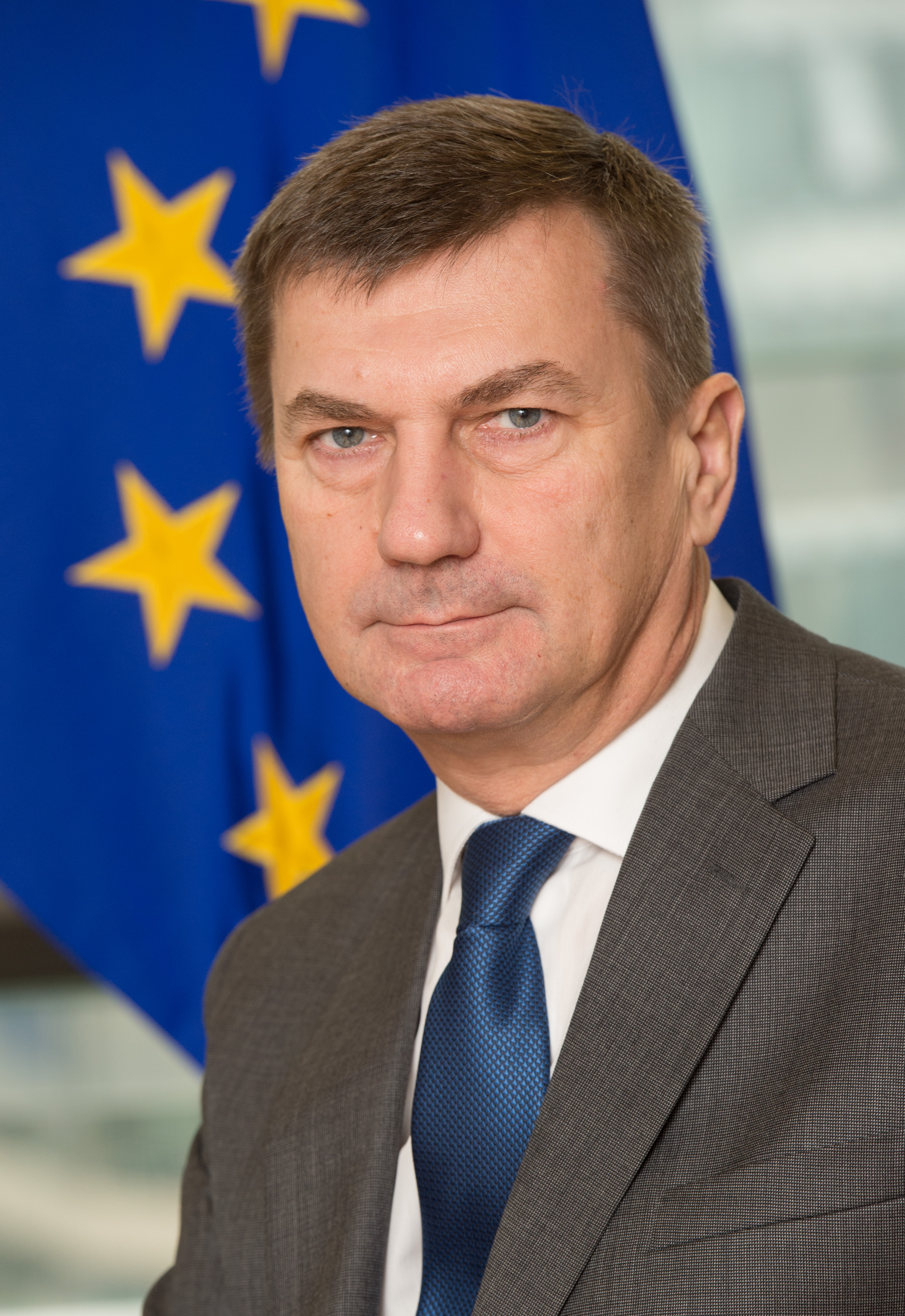
- Official portrait, 2014

Member of the European Parliament for Estonia
- In office 2 July 2019 – 15 July 2024

European Commissioner for Digital Single Market
- In office 1 November 2014 – 1 July 2019
- Commission: Juncker
- Preceded by: Neelie Kroes (Digital Agenda)
- Succeeded by: Maroš Šefčovič (Acting)

European Commissioner for Digital Economy and Society Acting
- In office 1 January 2017 – 7 July 2017
- Commission: Juncker
- Preceded by: Günther Oettinger
- Succeeded by: Mariya Gabriel

Prime Minister of Estonia
- In office 12 April 2005 – 26 March 2014
- President: Arnold Rüütel; Toomas Hendrik Ilves
- Preceded by: Juhan Parts
- Succeeded by: Taavi Rõivas

Minister of Economic Affairs and Communications
- In office 23 September 2004 – 12 April 2005
- Prime Minister: Juhan Parts
- Preceded by: Meelis Atonen
- Succeeded by: Edgar Savisaar

Mayor of Tartu
- In office 10 September 1998 – 23 September 2004
- Preceded by: Roman Mugur
- Succeeded by: Laine Randjärv

Personal details
- Born: 1 October 1956 (age 69) Tartu, then part of Estonian SSR, Soviet Union
- Party: Reform Party
- Spouse: Anu Ansip
- Children: 3
- Education: University of Tartu; Estonian University of Life Sciences
- Andrus Ansip's voice Ansip speaking at a press conference with José Manuel Barroso; Recorded 6 December 2005

Andrus Ansip (Estonian pronunciation: [ˈɑnːtrus ˈɑnʲːsʲipː]; born 1 October 1956) is an Estonian politician, a former member of the European Parliament, the former European Commissioner for Digital Single Market and Vice President of the European Commission, in office from 2014 until 2019. Previously, he was Prime Minister of Estonia from 2005 to 2014 and chairman of the liberal Estonian Reform Party (Estonian: Reformierakond) from 2004 to 2014.

Before his entry into politics Ansip trained as a chemist, before working in banking and business. He entered Parliament in 2004, quickly becoming Minister of Economic Affairs, and subsequently prime minister in April 2005. On 1 November 2014, he was appointed to the European Commission.

== Early life and business career ==
Born in Tartu, Ansip graduated from the University of Tartu with a degree in chemistry in 1979. He worked as an engineer at the university from 1979 to 1983 (with a two-year break for mandatory military service). He was an instructor in the Industry Department and Head of the Organisational Department of the Tartu District Committee of the Soviet Union Communist Party Estonian branch Estonian Communist Party from 1986 to 1988. Ansip has been involved in several banking and investment ventures. He has served as a Member of the Board of Directors of the People's Bank of Tartu (Estonian: Rahvapank), Chairman of the Board of Livonia Privatisation IF, and CEO of Investment Fund Broker Ltd (Estonian: Fondiinvesteeringu Maakler AS). He also has served as Chairman of the board for Radio Tartu.

From 1989 to 1993 Andrus Ansip also managed a Tartu branch of AS Estkompexim.

== Political career ==
=== Mayor of Tartu ===
In 1998, Ansip was elected as Mayor of Tartu as a candidate of the centrist-right Reformierakond (Reform Party), a position which he held until 2004, to great popular acclaim and very high ratings in the opinion polls. He had run in previous elections for the Riigikogu, the Estonian Parliament, but had always given up his seat in order to remain Mayor. He was succeeded by fellow Reform Party member Laine Jänes.

=== Chairman of Reform Party and Minister of Economics ===
On 21 November 2004, Ansip became Chairman of Estonian Reform Party because the party's founder and hitherto chairman, former prime minister Siim Kallas, had become EU Commissioner and vice president and thus had to move to Brussels. It was obvious that Ansip would have to move to Tallinn, and a chance opened up when the Minister of Economic Affairs and Communications in the coalition government of Juhan Parts, Meelis Atonen, a party colleague, had to resign. Ansip became his successor on 13 September. His track record as Minister is more difficult to evaluate because of the short duration of his service.

=== Prime minister ===
On 31 March 2005, Ansip was charged by President Arnold Rüütel to form a government, following 24 March 2005 resignation by Prime Minister Juhan Parts. Ansip was able to form a coalition with the Centre Party and the People's Union of Estonia, which was approved by the Riigikogu on 12 April 2005. Ansip thus became Prime Minister of Estonia. He was backed by 53 out of 101 members of the Riigikogu, 40 deputies voting against. He and the ministers were inaugurated in office the next day, on 13 April.

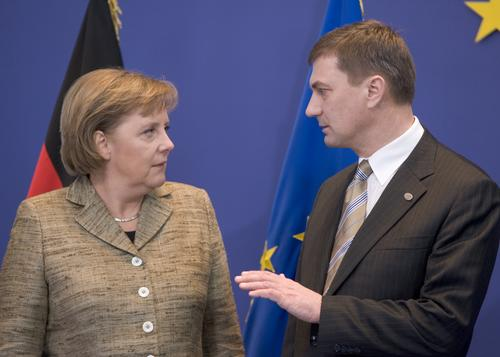
Ansip with German Chancellor Angela Merkel, March 2007

On 4 March 2007, Ansip's Reform Party won 27 percent of the vote in the Estonian parliamentary elections, raising its mandate in the Riigikogu to 31 seats from 19. Ansip personally received over 22,500 votes. He was charged by President Toomas Hendrik Ilves to form a government. This time the Reform Party formed a coalition with the Union of Pro Patria and Res Publica (IRL) and the Social Democratic Party. His second term as prime minister began on 5 April 2007. In May 2009, the Social Democrats left the government, and as coalition talks with the People's Union of Estonia failed, it was decided to continue with a minority government of the Reform Party and IRL.

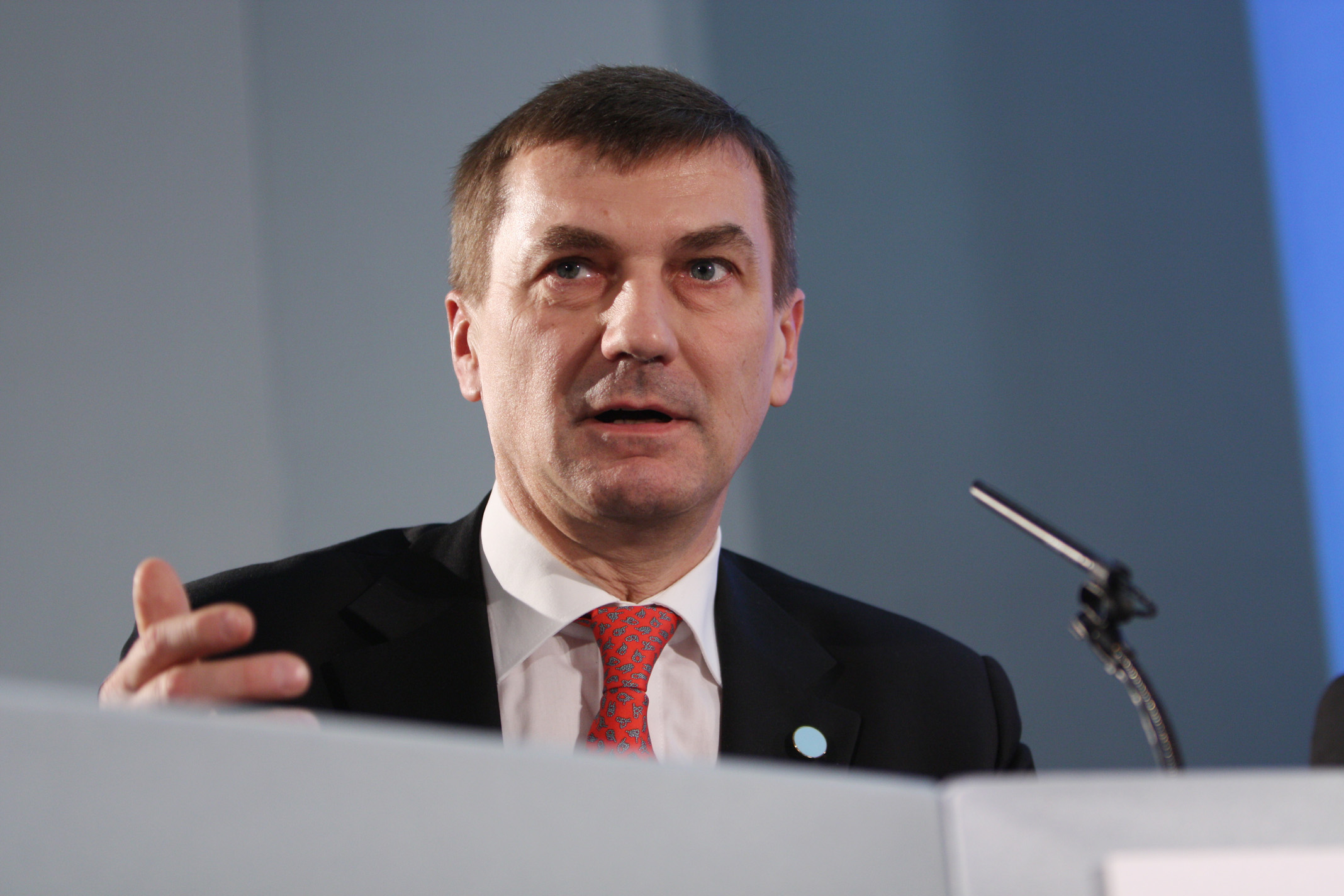
Ansip at the UK Nordic Baltic Summit in London, 20 January 2011

In March 2011, the Reform Party won 33 seats in the Riigikogu, remaining the largest party even after the country's economic output had fallen by 14% in 2009 due to the 2008 financial crisis and the collapse of a real estate price bubble fueled by cheap and easy credit from Nordic banks. Ansip was once again charged by President Toomas Hendrik Ilves to form a government. The Reform Party continued in a coalition with the Union of Pro Patria and Res Publica. Ansip's third term as prime minister began on 6 April 2011, when Riigikogu approved his third cabinet.

But Ansip's center-right coalition soon struggled in polls amid signs of voter fatigue at years of a government focused on fiscal austerity as well as several high-profile party funding scandals. The center-left opposition also gained popularity.

On 4 March 2014, Ansip announced his resignation to enable a successor to lead his party into 2015 elections. From 4 December 2013 to 26 March 2014 he was the longest-serving prime minister in the European Union.

=== Vice President of the European Commission ===
In the 2014 European elections, Ansip was elected as an MEP received the largest number of preferential votes in Estonia. Shortly after, Prime Minister Taavi Rõivas nominated him as the country's next European Commissioner.

On 10 September 2014 President-Elect Juncker of the European Commission announced that he proposed Andrus Ansip as Vice-President of the European Commission and the European Commissioner for the Digital Single Market. He was formally appointed by the European Council as vice president with the consent of the European Parliament.

=== Member of the European Parliament, 2019-2024 ===
Ansip was re-elected in 2019. Shortly after, he handed in his resignation from the European Commission to take up the European Parliament seat he won. In Parliament, he has since been serving on the Committee on the Internal Market and Consumer Protection. In 2020, he also joined the Committee on Petitions and the Special Committee on Artificial Intelligence in a Digital Age.

In addition to his committee assignments, Ansip is part of the Parliament's delegation for relations with the Pan-African Parliament. He is also a member of the European Internet Forum, the European Parliament Intergroup on Artificial Intelligence and Digital and the European Parliament Intergroup on Seas, Rivers, Islands and Coastal Areas.

In March 2024, Ansip announced that he would not stand in the 2024 European Parliament election.

== Relocation of the Bronze Soldier of Tallinn ==
One of the most controversial actions of Ansip's government was relocation of the Bronze Soldier of Tallinn from a prominent location in the center of Tallinn to the Defence Forces Cemetery of Tallinn adjacent to the city center. The removal of the monument, as well as war graves, from its location on 27 April 2007 led to mass protests and two nights of the worst rioting Estonia has seen since regaining independence.

== Personal life ==
Andrus Ansip is married to gynecologist Anu Ansip (b. 1956) and they have three daughters Reet (b. 1977), who is a stomatologist; Tiina (b. 1981) who is a journalist and Liisa (b. 1997).

Andrus Ansip is a member of the Estonian voluntary home guard organisation Kaitseliit (Defence League) since 10 November 2009.

== Awards ==
- On 31 July 2007 Ansip was recognized for "his service in fight for Estonian freedom and Estonian national idea" by Estonian Central Council in Canada.
- Estonian Newspaper Association named Ansip Press Enemy of 2007.
- Albania: On 5 April 2010 Received a copy of the key of the city of Tirana on the occasion of his state visit to Albania.

Political offices
Preceded by Roman Mugur	Mayor of Tartu; 1998–2004	Succeeded by Laine Randjärv
Preceded by Meelis Atonen	Minister of Economic Affairs and Communications; 2004–2005	Succeeded by Edgar Savisaar
Preceded by Juhan Parts	Prime Minister of Estonia; 2005–2014	Succeeded by Taavi Rõivas
Preceded by Siim Kallas	Estonian European Commissioner; 2014–2019	Succeeded by Kadri Simson
Preceded by Neelie Kroes as European Commissioner for Digital Agenda	European Commissioner for Digital Single Market; 2014–2019	Succeeded by Maroš Šefčovič; Acting
Preceded by Günther Oettinger	European Commissioner for Digital Economy and Society; Acting; 2017	Succeeded by Mariya Gabriel
