= Taavi Rõivas =

Estonian politician

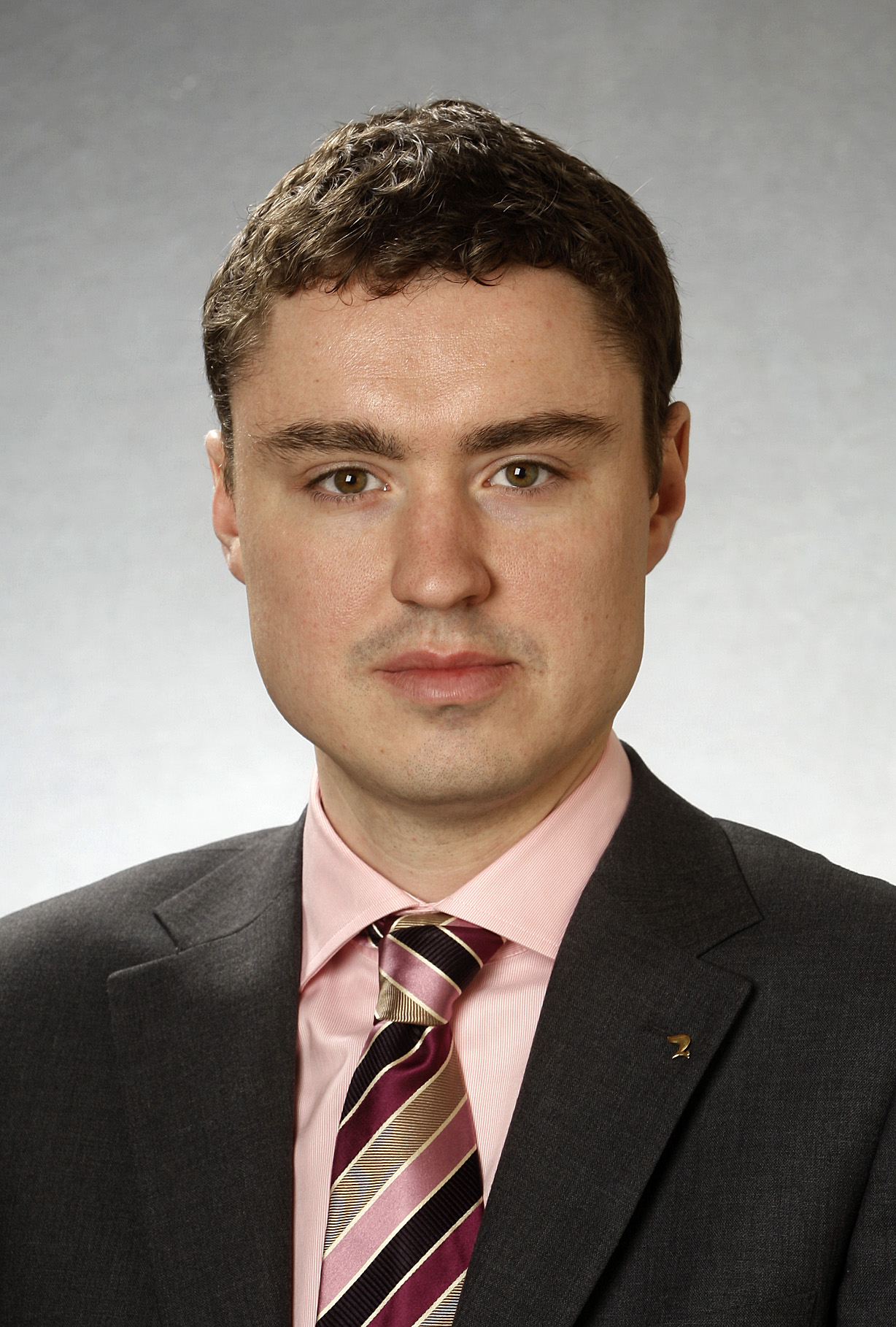
- Official portrait, 2011

Prime Minister of Estonia
- In office 26 March 2014 – 23 November 2016
- President: Toomas Hendrik Ilves; Kersti Kaljulaid
- Preceded by: Andrus Ansip
- Succeeded by: Jüri Ratas

Minister of Social Affairs
- In office 11 December 2012 – 26 March 2014
- Prime Minister: Andrus Ansip
- Preceded by: Hanno Pevkur
- Succeeded by: Helmen Kütt (Social Protection); Urmas Kruuse (Health and Labour)

Personal details
- Born: 26 September 1979 (age 47) Tallinn, then part of Estonian SSR, Soviet Union
- Party: Reform
- Spouse: Luisa Värk
- Children: 3
- Education: University of Tartu

Taavi Rõivas (Estonian pronunciation: [ˈtɑːʋi ˈrɤi̯ʋɑs]; born 26 September 1979) is an Estonian former politician and businessman who served as Prime Minister of Estonia from 2014 to 2016. He led the Reform Party from 2014 to 2017 and was previously the Minister of Social Affairs from 2012 to 2014. On 9 November 2016, his second cabinet dissolved after his coalition partners, the Union of Pro Patria and Res Publica and Social Democratic Party, sided with the opposition in a no confidence motion.

== Political career ==
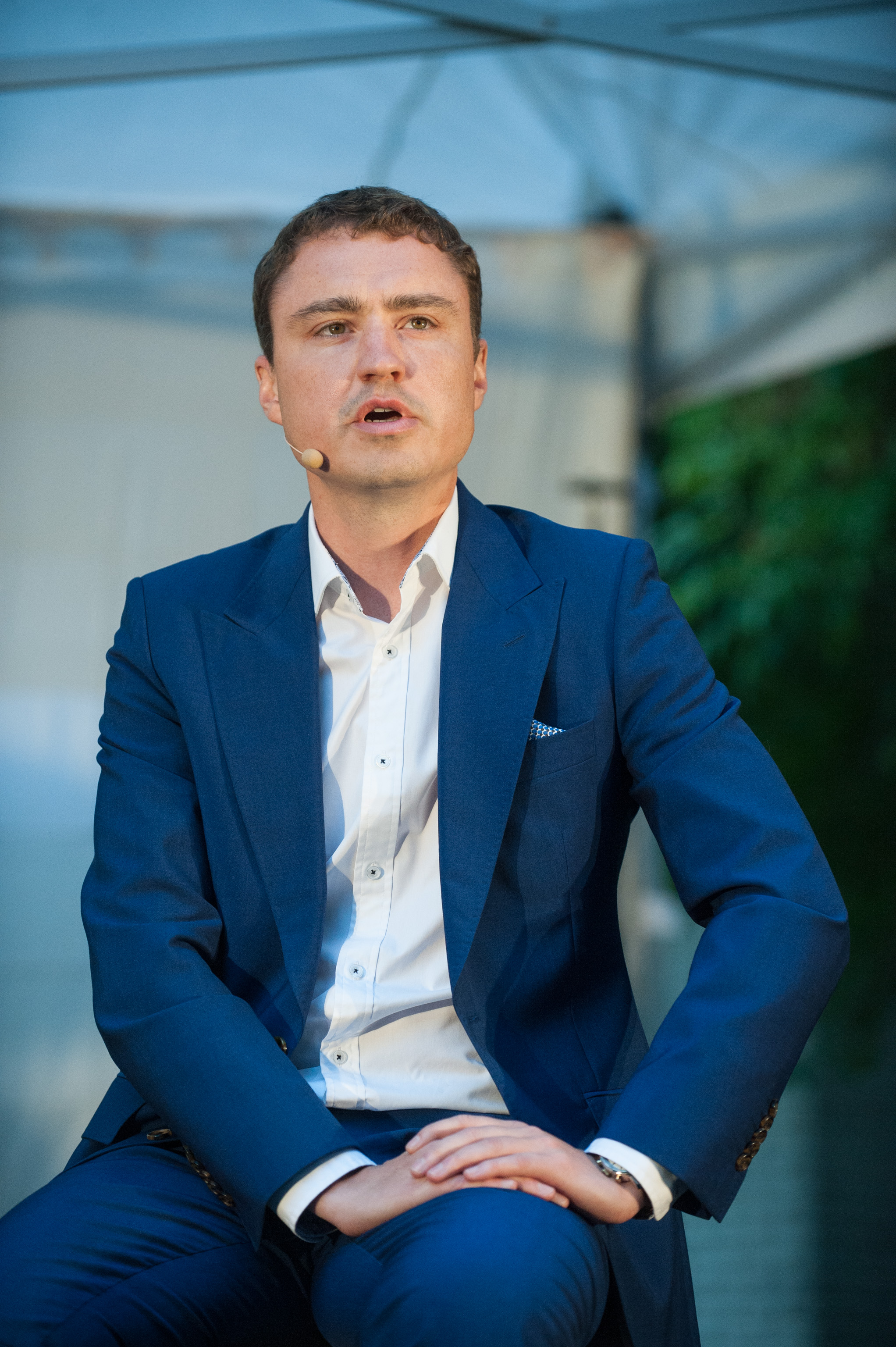
Rõivas in 2014

Rõivas joined the Reform Party in 1998. His political career began as an advisor to Minister of Justice Märt Rask from 1999 to 2002.

In February 2014, Prime Minister Andrus Ansip announced he would resign one year before the 2015 parliamentary elections and hand his post to the European Commissioner Siim Kallas, former Reform Party Leader and Prime Minister 2002–2003. Kallas began coalition talks with the Social Democratic Party, deciding to replace the conservative Pro Patria and Res Publica Union as Reform Party's coalition partner. On 12 March Kallas unexpectedly announced he would not seek the post, due to media scrutiny of his actions as President of the Bank of Estonia in the early 1990s. The same day, the leadership of Reform Party chose Rõivas as the new candidate for prime minister. The coalition agreement with the Social Democratic Party was signed on 20 March and the nomination was confirmed by the Riigikogu on 24 March. Rõivas became prime minister after the President Toomas Hendrik Ilves approved his proposed cabinet on 26 March 2014. At the time, Rõivas was the youngest government leader in the European Union.

Rõivas led his party to the 2015 parliamentary elections, in which the Reform Party succeeded in staying as the largest party and began coalition talks with the Social Democratic Party, the Pro Patria and Res Publica Union and the Free Party. After nearly three weeks of negotiations, the Free Party left the coalition talks due to disagreements with the Reform Party and the Pro Patria and Res Publica Union. The three remaining parties signed the coalition treaty on 8 April, and Rõivas' second cabinet took office on 9 April.

On 7 November 2016, the Social Democratic Party (SDE) and Pro Patria & Res Publica Union (IRL) announced that they were asking Prime Minister Taavi Rõivas to resign due to lack of trust among the coalition partners. The announcement came soon after the opposition had submitted a no-confidence motion in Rõivas' government. SDE and IRL proceeded with the motion, leaving the Reform Party the only party to support Rõivas. Rõivas responded to the situation by refusing to resign and arguing that a democratic-elected government should be only removed by a democratic vote. In the following vote of confidence on 9 November, the majority of Riigikogu voted in favor of removing the prime minister's government. On 23 November, the Center Party chairman Jüri Ratas was sworn in as the new prime minister, whereas Reform Party was left in the opposition. Rõivas subsequently announced that he would step down as the chairman of the party. On 7 January 2017, Hanno Pevkur was elected the new chairman of the Reform Party.

On 5 December 2016, Rõivas was elected as the deputy speaker of the Riigikogu. In September 2017, Rõivas led an Estonian trade delegation visit to Malaysia, during which the members of the delegation reportedly behaved in an undignified manner and were subsequently accused of harassment. Rõivas apologized for the behavior of the delegation and announced his resignation as the deputy speaker, but insisted on continuing as an MP for the Reform Party. Later he also apologized on live television to the victim of his alleged harassment, code-named Katrin in Estonian media.

At the end of 2020, Rõivas announced his retirement from politics and resigned from his parliament seat to pursue a business career.

== Personal life ==
Rõivas speaks Estonian, English, Russian, Ukrainian and Finnish.

Rõivas has been engaged to the pop singer Luisa Värk since 2016. They have one daughter, Miina Rihanna, born in 2009.

== See also ==
- Taavi Rõivas' first cabinet
- Taavi Rõivas' second cabinet

Political offices
Preceded by Hanno Pevkur	Minister of Social Affairs; 2012–2014	Succeeded by Helmen Kütt as Minister of Social Protection
Preceded by Hanno Pevkur	Minister of Social Affairs; 2012–2014	Succeeded by Urmas Kruuse as Minister of Health and Labour
Preceded by Andrus Ansip	Prime Minister of Estonia; 2014–2016	Succeeded by Jüri Ratas
