= Heyck =

Heyck is a surname. Notable people with the surname include:

- Eduard Heyck (1862–1941), German cultural historian, editor, writer, and poet
- Hans Heyck (1891–1972), German writer

== See also ==
- Heck (surname)
