= Friderico-Francisceum =

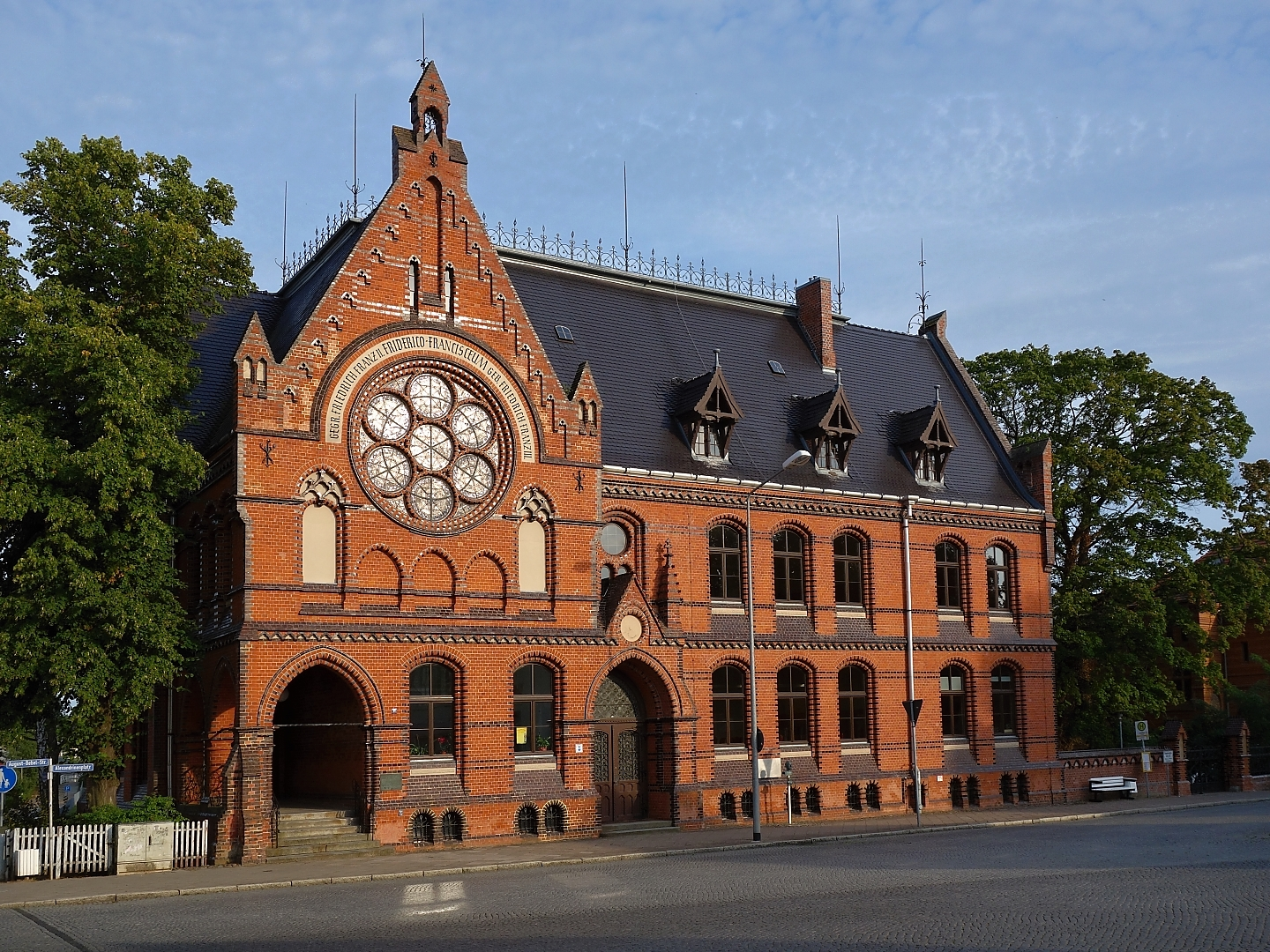
- Main building, 2012

Location
- Alexandrinenplatz 11; Bad Doberan, Mecklenburg-Vorpommern; Germany
- Coordinates: 54°06′16″N 11°54′15″E

Information
- Type: Gymnasium
- Established: 21 April 1879
- Principal: Birgit Hacker
- Grades: 7 to 12
- Gender: coed
- Enrollment: c. 900 (2016)
- Classes: 37
- Newspaper: Stichling
- Website: www.ffg-dbr.de

The Friderico-Francisceum (FFG) is a gymnasium in Bad Doberan, Germany.

== History ==
In 1879, Frederick Francis II, Grand Duke of Mecklenburg-Schwerin decided to establish a gymnasium in Doberan, a city of 4000 inhabitants which had been granted town rights in the same year. The school was officially opened by its first principal Wilhelm Kraner on April 21, 1879. It was located at Dammstraße, today’s Beethovenstraße. Students at the age of 10 to 14 attended the school in the first year. They were educated by four teachers. Initially a Progymnasium with only lower grades, the school was granted expansion to a full gymnasium by the grand duke in 1883.

After Frederick Francis II died in 1883, his successor Frederick Francis III named the school Friderico-Francisceum in honour of the founder.

In 1889, the gymnasium moved into its present-day building at Alexandrinenplatz. The schoolhouse had been constructed by Doberan-based architect Gotthilf Ludwig Möckel.

Female students were allowed to attend the school for the first time in 1927.

Several teachers as well as students died in both World War I and II.

The school was renamed Goethe-Oberschule after the Second World War and adapted to the new East German educational system. In 1958, the school was designated an Extended Secondary School. Starting in 1983, only grade 11 and 12 students attended the school due to an educational reform.

After the German reunification, the school was adjusted to West German educational norms in 1991. The course system was adopted and students attended the gymnasium from grade 5 on. Additionally, the original name Friderico-Francisceum has been reintroduced.

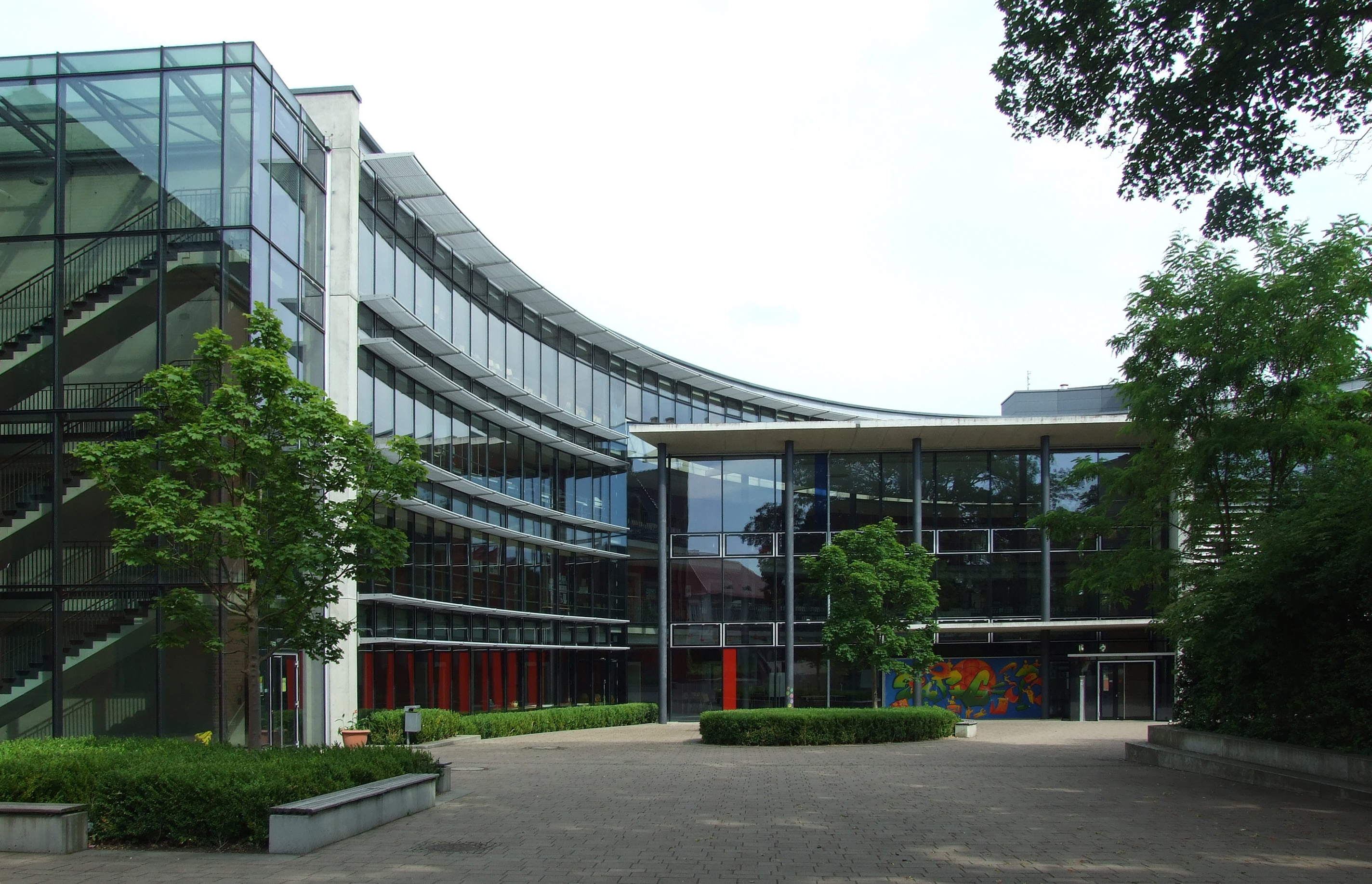
Extension building, 2010

A newly built extension building right behind the main building opened in 2001, providing modern-day classrooms and teaching material.

Due to school closures in Schwaan and Neubukow, the gymnasium's enrollment grew in recent years. An auxiliary building at Verbindungsstraße has been in use since 2017.

== Notable alumni ==
- Hans Jürgen von der Wense (1894–1966), poet and composer
- Klaus von Bismarck (1912–1997), Director General of the Westdeutscher Rundfunk
- Claus von Amsberg (1926–2002), Prince consort of the Netherlands

== Former headteachers ==
- Wilhelm Kraner (1879–1881)
- Wilhelm Kühne (1881–1908)
- Carl Lüth (1908–1924)
- Carl Reuter (1924–1932)
- Helmuth Gaedt (1932–1937)
- Willi Brandt (1937–1950)
- Wilhelm Dethloff (1950–1952)
- Arthur Bengelstorff (1952–1966)
- Bodo Michels (1966–1970)
- Herbert Rüting (1970–1972)
- Günter Boeldt (1972–1980)
- Klaus Krüger (1980–1986)
- Karin Fourmont (1986–1991)
- Arno Lange (1991–1992)
- Roland Levetzow (1992–2011)
- Birgit Hacker (2011–)
