= Kamp (Bad Doberan) =

Triangular park in Bad Doberan, Germany

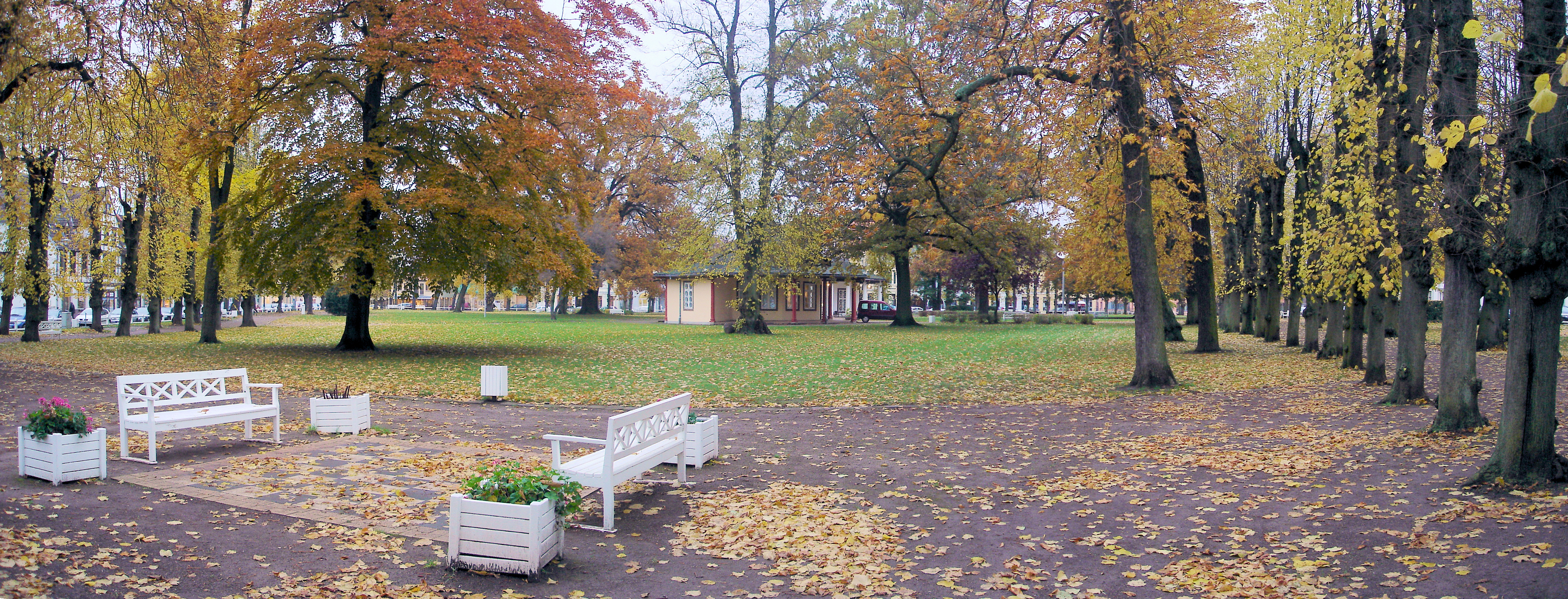
The Kamp from the south

The Kamp (German pronunciation: [kamp]) is a triangular, lime-fringed park, about two hectares in area, which was laid out in 1800 in the centre of the small German town of Bad Doberan. In the 19th century, the Kamp was the social hub of the Doberan, because it was surrounded by the most prestigious buildings in the town.

== History ==
In 1793, following the foundation of Germany's first seaside resort in Heiligendamm, the Duke of Mecklenburg, Frederick Francis I, pressed ahead with the development of Doberan (the name was changed to Bad Doberan in the 1920s) as his ducal summer residence. As well as being the residence of the Duke and his court, Doberan also became the meeting place for the social elite of the state. Whilst Heiligendamm attracted visitors with its bathing establishments, Doberan drew them mainly with its variety of amusements and social events. But the town need to be further developed. The triangular cow pasture situated in front of the Logierhaus was fenced off with barriers, footpaths were laid and it was turned into a park. Thus, the Kamp became the centre of Doberan. A restaurateur from Milan, Gaetano Medini, offered food in a tent, and concerts by the Duke's orchestra were held here. The Kamp was festively illuminated during the bathing season and there were firework displays. Since the original thatched houses of Doberan's villagers were not in keeping with the image of a ducal summer residence, the Duke forbade their construction and paid subsidies for the construction of tiled houses. With the engagement of Carl Theodor Severin, an architect, in 1802, several prestigious buildings were erected around the Kamp, including a theatre, the Logierhaus, a palace and a salon building (Salongebäude).

== Red Pavilion ==
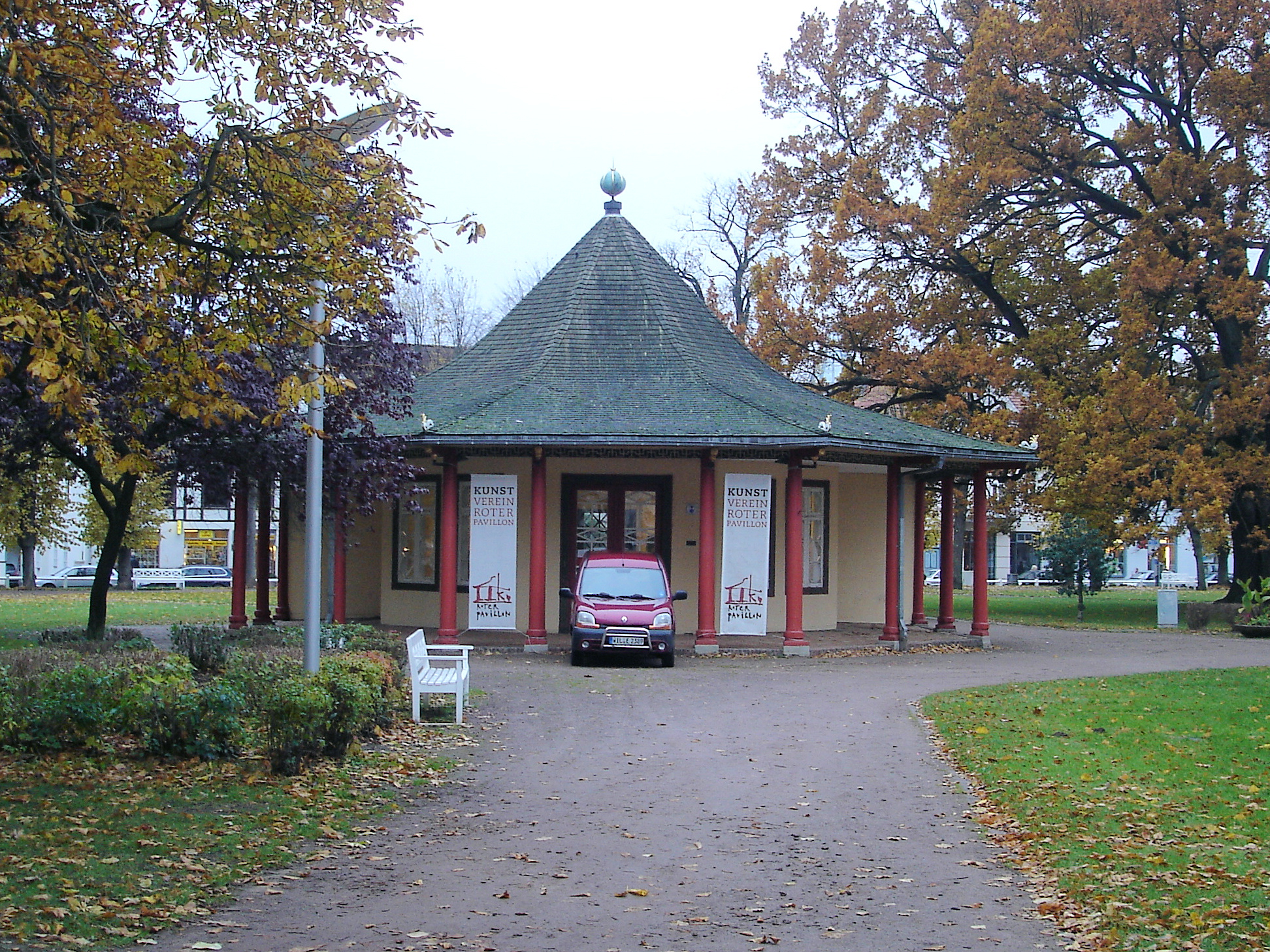
The Red, or Little, Pavilion

In spring 1808 the tents and wooden stalls on the Kamp were so dilapidated that the duke ordered the construction of a permanent building "in the shape of a funnel". The prototype was supposed to have been a building that Frederick Francis had seen during his Danish exile near Altona. Severin changed the drawing given to him, but kept the basic idea. On 17 May 1808 construction began and was completed in time for the start of the bathing season. The octagonal building represents a link between Classicism and Chinoiserie. The external shape of the building has been preserved, by contrast the interior was completely destroyed.

Originally the Red or Little Pavilion (Roter or Kleiner Pavillon) was used as a bar and music stage. Today it acts as a modern art gallery sponsored by the Red Pavilion Art Society (Kunstverein Roter Pavillon). The exhibitions mainly contain works by regional artists.

== White Pavilion ==
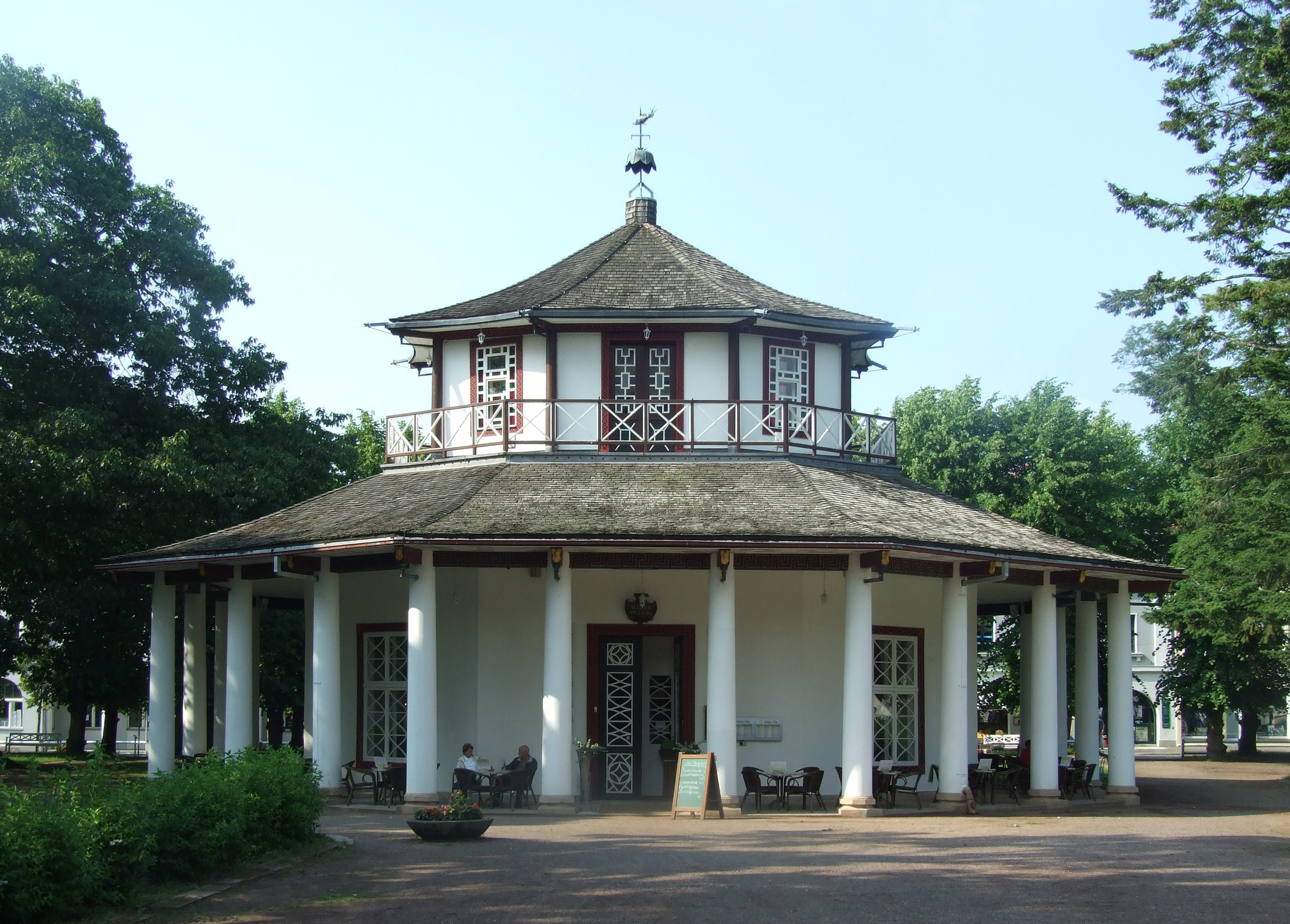
The Great, or White, Pavilion

In 1810 Severin was supposed to have been contracted for the construction of a large music pavilion and other shopping pavilions, that were to be rented for income. Due to a lack of finance the work was constantly delayed. In 1812 Severin had to complete the shops at the behest of the duke. They were built rather hastily in order to ensure they could be rented during the bathing season. Their final completion was carried out in 1813, together with the White Pavilion (Weißer Pavillon). The shopping pavilions were demolished in 1860 as they were no longer used.

The White Pavilion, also referred to in the literature as the Great Pavilion (Großer Pavillon), was built on the northern side of the Kamp. Above the ground floor, a second floor was built as a belvedere with an all-round balcony. The floor plan is an elongated octagon, in which there is an oval room of 14.5 metres by 10.4 metres. Around the building runs a walkway with 24 columns. The ceiling of the hall is vaulted. The interior was partially restored during renovations in 1974-1976.

Today the White Pavilion is used as a café.

== Literature ==
- Judith Groschank: Bäderarchitektur in Doberan-Heiligendamm, Opaion, Kiel, 1999, ISBN 3-9806808-1-9
