= Johanna André =

German soprano (1861–1926)

- Johanna André as Isolde (before 1900)
- Born: 30 June 1859; Bad Doberan, Germany
- Died: 23 June 1926 (aged 66); Braunschweig, Germany
- Occupation: Operatic soprano
- Organizations: Braunschweig Court Theatre

Johanna André (30 June 1859 – 23 June 1926) was a German soprano in opera and concert and a voice teacher. A long-term member of the Braunschweig Court Theatre, she appeared at major German opera houses, especially in dramatic roles such as Beethoven's Fidelio, and Wagner's Senta, Isolde and Brünnhilde. She took part in the world premiere of Wagner's Parsifal at the Bayreuth Festival.

== Life ==
Johanna André was born in Bad Doberan on 30 June 1859. She was the daughter of the grand ducal court opera singer Anton André, who was a member of the Schwerin Court Theatre. After voice training in Berlin, she made her stage debut there as Ännchen in Weber's Der Freischütz at the Kroll Opera in 1875. She then performed at the court theatre in Darmstadt and from 1876 at the Stadttheater Bremen. In 1877, she was engaged by Franz Abt for the court theatre in Braunschweig, where she remained until she retired from the stage in 1906. She became known for dramatic roles by Wagner, including Senta in Der fliegende Holländer, Isolde in Tristan und Isolde, and Brünnhilde in Der Ring des Nibelungen. Other leading roles included Donna Anna in Mozart's Don Giovanni and Pamina in Die Zauberflöte, the title role in Beethoven's Fidelio, and Agathe in Der Freischütz. On 27 November 1887, she took part in the world premiere of Der wilde Jäger by August Schulz in Braunschweig.

André sang these roles also as a guest at the Hannover and Kassel court operas, at the Oper Frankfurt and the Oper Leipzig. In 1882, she was invited to participate at the world premiere of Parsifal at the second Bayreuth Festival as one of the Flower Maidens, repeated the two following years.

André was also active as a concert singer and as a singing teacher in Braunschweig, where she died at the age of 66.
