= Erlöserkirche, Dresden =

Church in Dresden

Coordinates: 51°03′04″N 13°46′55″E

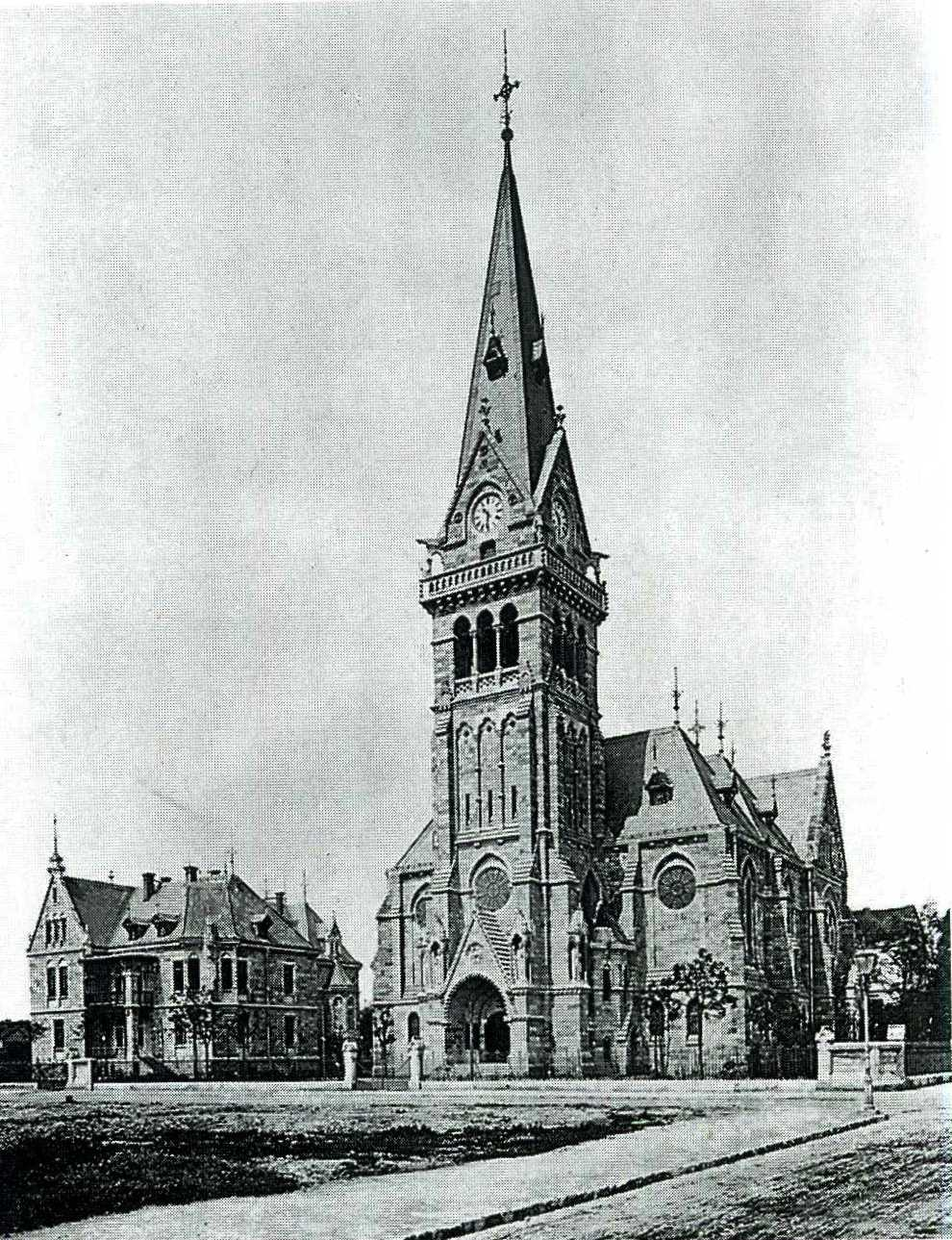
The Erlöserkirche in 1880

The Erlöserkirche (Church of the Redeemer) was a Protestant neo-Gothic church building in Dresden. It was built by from 1878 to 1880 by Gotthilf Ludwig Möckel. The church was wrecked in 1945 by Allied bombing during World War 2, and was finally demolished in 1961–62.
