= Michael Buddrus =

German historian (born 1957)

- Born: 1957 (age 68–69); Bad Doberan, Mecklenburg-Vorpommern, Germany
- Education: University of Rostock
- Occupation: Historian

Michael Buddrus (born 1957) is a German historian.

== Life ==
Born in Bad Doberan, from 1974 Buddrus completed a three-year locksmithing apprenticeship in Warnemünde. From 1978 to 1983, he studied at the University of Rostock. Afterwards he worked as a research assistant at the Schiffbau- und Schifffahrtsmuseum Rostock. In the years 1985–1988, he was an aspirant at the University of Rostock. With a doctoral thesis on the history of the Hitler Youth he succeeded in 1989 in obtaining the Promotion A. He then worked until 1991 as a research assistant at the Institute for German History of the German Academy of Sciences at Berlin, then until 1993 as a research assistant at the University of Siegen. In 1994 he moved to the Institute of Contemporary History (Munich).

He conducts biographical research on National Socialist functionaries and researches on Mecklenburg history in Nazi Germany. He argues that there was no involuntary membership in the NSDAP. In October 2013 he was appointed to the Historische Kommission für Mecklenburg.

== Publications ==
- with Ingo Koch: Ausgewähltes Protokoll der Wissenschaftlichen Konferenz „Geschichte der Beziehungen der Deutschen Arbeiterjugendbewegung und der FDJ zum Leninschen Komsomol – ihre Bedeutung für den Kampf um den Frieden“ (= Schriftenreihe zur Geschichte der FDJ. 66, ZDB-ID 1146579-7). Verlag Junge Welt (in Kommission), Berlin 1987.
- Die Organisation „Dienst für Deutschland“. Arbeitsdienst und Militarisierung in der DDR. Juventa, Weinheim u. a. 1994, ISBN 3-7799-1124-8.
- collaboration at the Biographisches Lexikon für Mecklenburg.
- Anmerkungen zur Jugendpolitik der KPD 1945/46. In Hartmut Mehringer, Michael Schwartz, Hermann Wentker (editor): Erobert oder befreit? Deutschland im internationalen Kräftefeld und die Sowjetische Besatzungszone (1945/46) (= Schriftenreihe der Vierteljahrshefte für Zeitgeschichte. Sondernummer.). Oldenbourg, München 1999, ISBN 3-486-64504-8, p. 287–336.
- Totale Erziehung für den totalen Krieg. Hitlerjugend und nationalsozialistische Jugendpolitik (= Texte und Materialien zur Zeitgeschichte. 13). 2 Teile. K. G. Saur, Munich 2003, ISBN 3-598-11615-2.
- with Sigrid Fritzlar: Die Professoren der Universität Rostock im Dritten Reich. Ein biographisches Lexikon (= Texte und Materialien zur Zeitgeschichte. 16). K. G. Saur Verlag, Munich 2007, ISBN 978-3-598-11775-6.
- with Sigrid Fritzlar: Mecklenburg im Zweiten Weltkrieg. Die Tagungen des Gauleiters Friedrich Hildebrandt mit den NS-Führungsgremien des Gaues Mecklenburg 1939–1945. Eine Edition der Sitzungsprotokolle (= Quellen und Studien aus den Landesarchiven Mecklenburg-Vorpommerns. 10). Edition Temmen, Bremen 2009, ISBN 978-3-8378-4000-1.
- with Sigrid Fritzlar: Die Städte Mecklenburgs im Dritten Reich. Ein Handbuch zur Stadtentwicklung im Nationalsozialismus, ergänzt durch ein biographisches Lexikon der Bürgermeister, Stadträte und Ratsherren. Edition Temmen, Bremen 2011, ISBN 978-3-8378-4029-2.
- with Sigrid Fritzlar: Landesregierungen und Minister in Mecklenburg 1871–1952. Ein biographisches Lexikon. Edition Temmen, Bremen 2012, ISBN 978-3-8378-4044-5.
- Hennecke von Plessen (1894–1968). Gutsbesitzer, Gauwirtschaftsberater, Geheimdienstoffizier, Gefangener, Grubenholzvertreter, Geschäftsführungsgehilfe. Biographie eines mecklenburgischen Adligen. Thomas Helms, Schwerin 2015, ISBN 978-3-940207-12-8.
