= Olaf Klose =

German librarian, historian and art historian

Olaf Klose (13 January 1903 − 22 March 1987) was a German art historian and librarian.

== Life and career ==
Born in Bad Doberan, Klose studied History, art history and North Germanic languages. In 1929 with the work Die Familienverhältnisse auf Island. Vor der Bekehrung zum Christentum auf Grund der Islendingasögur presented at the University of Leipzig he was awarded the title of Dr. phil. Doctorate promoted. He then worked in libraries in Kiel, Berlin, Marburg and Copenhagen.

From 1949 to 1970 he was director of the Schleswig-Holsteinische Landesbibliothek in Kiel. He was also secretary of the "Society for Schleswig-Holstein History" and as successor of Volquart Pauls (later with Wolfgang Prange) publisher of the Zeitschrift der Gesellschaft für Schleswig-Holsteinische Geschichte.

Klose died at the age of 84.

== Awards ==
- 1968: Order of Merit of the Federal Republic of Germany 1st classe
- University medal of the Christian-Albrechts-Universität zu Kiel.
- 1969: Honorary Professorship of the Landes Schleswig-Holstein in Würdigung seiner Verdienste um das Bibliothekswesen in Schleswig-Holstein und um die Erforschung der schleswig-holsteinischen Geschichte.

== Publications ==
- Die Familienverhältnisse auf Island. Vor der Bekehrung zum Christentum auf Grund der Islendingasögur. Dissertation. University of Leipzig 1929. Westermann, Braunschweig 1929, Literature by and about Olaf Klose in the German National Library catalogue.
- Islandkatalog der Universitätsbibliothek Kiel und der Universitäts- und Stadtbibliothek Köln. Universitätsbibliothek, Kiel 1931, Literature by and about Olaf Klose in the German National Library catalogue.
- Die nordische Professur in Kiel in der 2. Hälfte des 19. Jahrhunderts. Quellen zur Geschichte der Beziehungen zwischen Kiel und dem Norden. In De Libris. Bibliofile Breve til Ejnar Munksgaard paa 50-Aarsdagen 28. Februar. Kopenhagen 1940, pp. 56–74.
- with Hans Hingst, Volquart Pauls: Geschichte Schleswig-Holsteins. Wachholtz, Neumünster 1955–1960.
- Schleswig-Holstein und Hamburg. Kröner, Stuttgart 1958. 2nd edition 1964.
- Die Jahrzehnte der Wiedervereinigung 1721–73. In Geschichte Schleswig-Holsteins. VI, 1959, pp. 1–159.
- Ferdinand Tönnies, Friedrich Paulsen. Briefwechsel 1876–1908. Ed. together with Georg Jacoby and Irma Fischer. Hirt, Kiel 1961 (Publications of the Schleswig-Holstein University Society, N.F., 27).
- with Lilli Martius: Ortsansichten und Stadtpläne der Herzogtümer Schleswig, Holstein und Lauenburg. Wachholtz, Neumünster 1962.
- Dänemark. Handbuch der historischen Stätten. Kröner, Stuttgart 1982, ISBN 978-3-520-32701-7.

== Literature ==
- Alfred Kamphausen (ed.): Schleswig-Holstein und der Norden. Festschrift für Olaf Klose zum 65. Geburtstag. Wachholtz, Neumünster 1968, OCLC 2956204.
- Klose, Olaf. In Carsten Mish: Otto Scheel (1876–1954). Eine biographische Studie zu Lutherforschung, Landeshistoriographie und deutsch-dänischen Beziehungen. Vandenhoeck & Ruprecht, Göttingen 2015, ISBN 978-3-647-55776-2, p. 378.
