= St. John's Church, Dresden =

Demolished church building in Dresden, Germany

Coordinates: 51°02′59″N 13°45′26″E

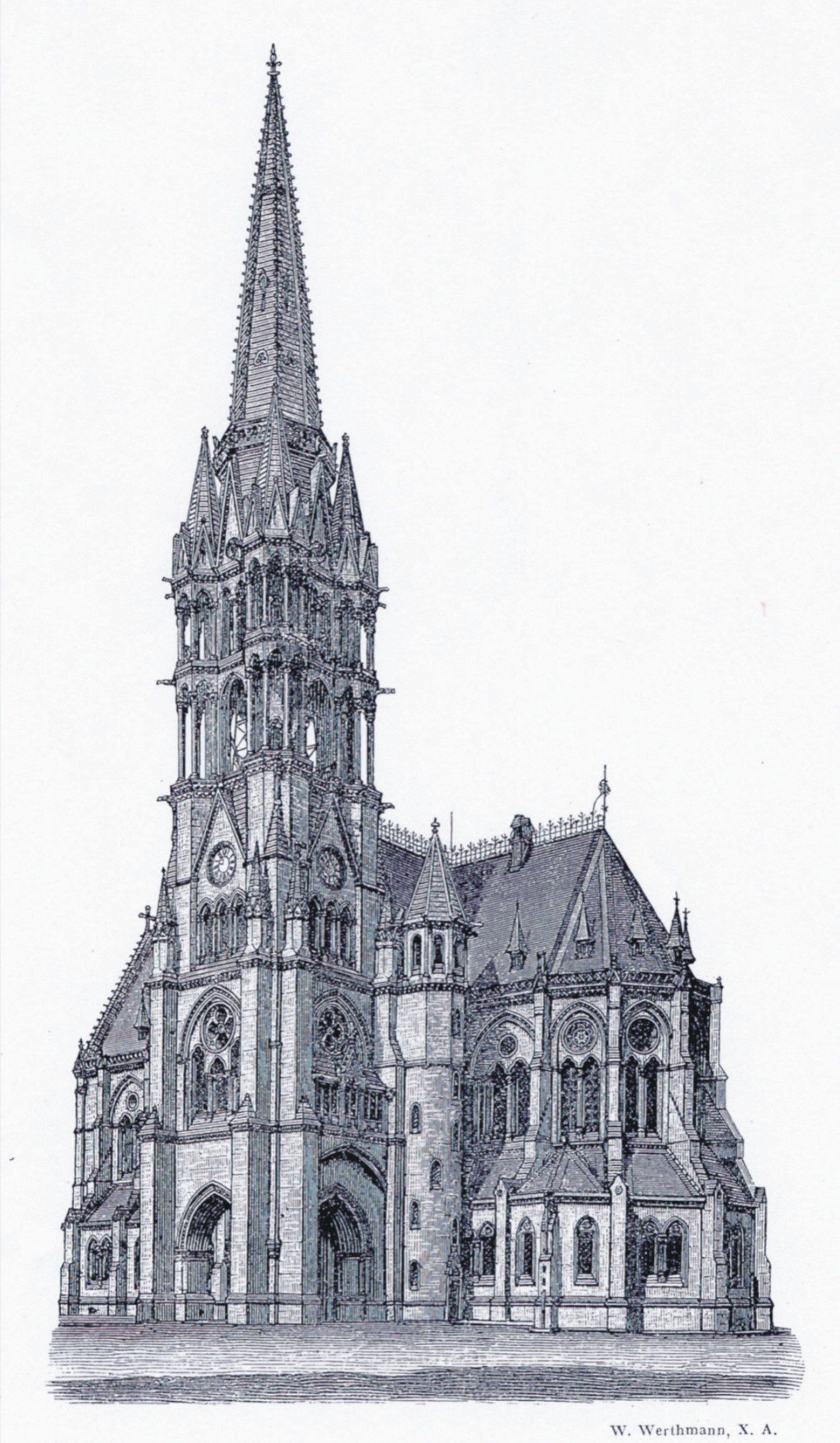
The Johanneskirche in 1878)

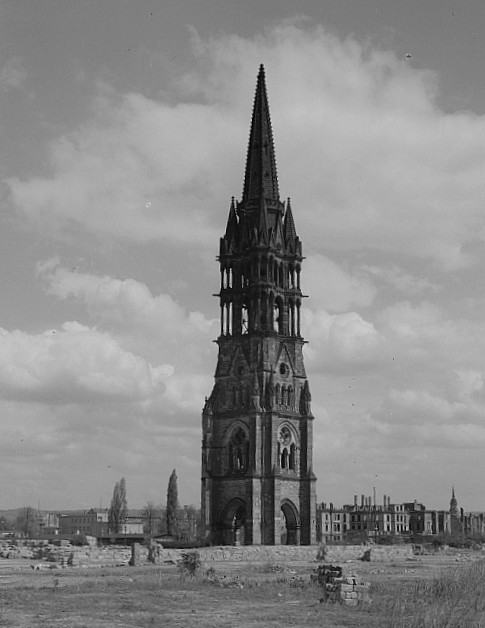
The Johanneskirche in 1951

St. John's (German: Johanneskirche) was a church in Dresden dedicated to Saint John the Baptist. It was built from 1874 to 1878 to designs by Gotthilf Ludwig Möckel, making it the first known neo-Gothic building in the city. It was damaged by bombing in the Second World War and demolished in 1954.
