= Carl Theodor Severin =

German architect

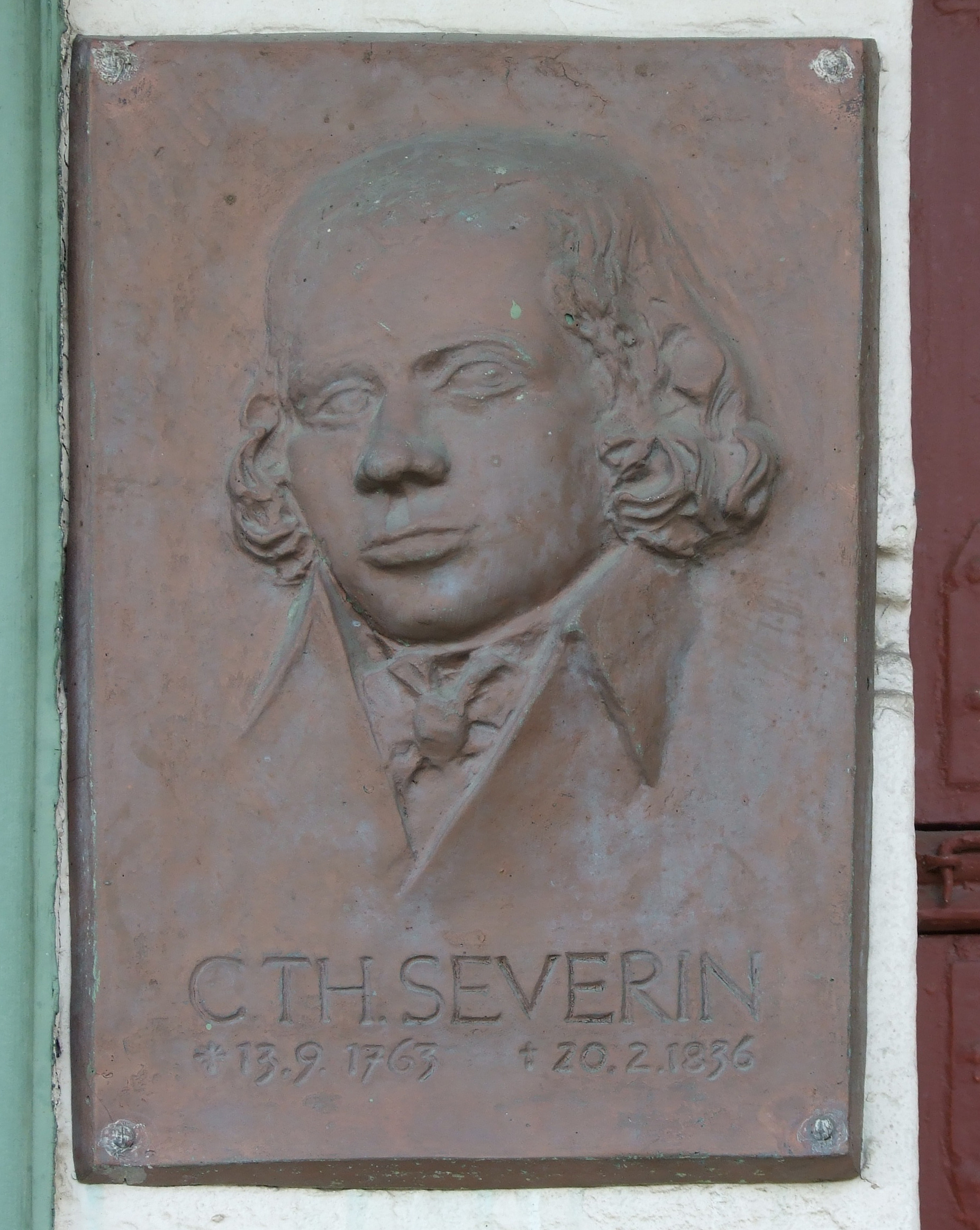
Tablet at Severin's house in Bad Doberan

Carl Theodor Severin (13 September 1763, Mengeringhausen – 20 February 1836, Bad Doberan, Germany) was a German architect. He is regarded as one of the most important representatives of classicism in Mecklenburg.

== Life ==
Severin was born the first child of the government and consistory council Theodor Severin (born 1733) and his wife Christina Eleonore Henrietta Becker (born 1744). Nothing is known about his education as an architect. From 1789 onward, he was based in Mecklenburg.

In 1795, he was hired as the bauconducteur of Doberan. Severin was to assist his predecessor Johann Christoph Heinrich von Seydewitz until his retirement in 1796. Since Seydewitz stayed in the office for a longer period than expected, Severin first became an unpaid chamber engineer in 1795 at the Schweriner Kammerkollegium, and in November 1795 he was given the position of "bauconducteur to the local court and town buildings". In 1799, he rebuilt the Gut Nustrow, which had been owned by the von Schack family for only a few years. In 1801, Severin worked on the ducal [from 1815: archducal] summer residency at Heiligendamm. Together with Seydewitz he built the salon building at the Kamp. Through this work Friedrich Franz I noticed Severin and entrusted him with extensive work to expand the seaside resort of Heiligendamm and to redesign the village of Doberan.

In 1803, Severin built a male bath and an annex to the bathhouse in Heiligendamm, the rotunda in 1804 and the viewing tower in 1807. Nearly all of these buildings are no longer preserved.

His first buildings in Doberan included the theater, which he built in 1805. From 1806 to 1809, his repertoire was followed the ducal palace and 1808 a pavilion at the Kamp. In April 1809, Severin was appointed as Landbaumeister. He was thus responsible for the offices of Buckow, Doberan, Ribnitz, Rühn, Toitenwinkel and Schwaan. The focus of his work continued to be the expansion of Heiligendamm and Doberan, which is why he moved to Doberan in 1810.

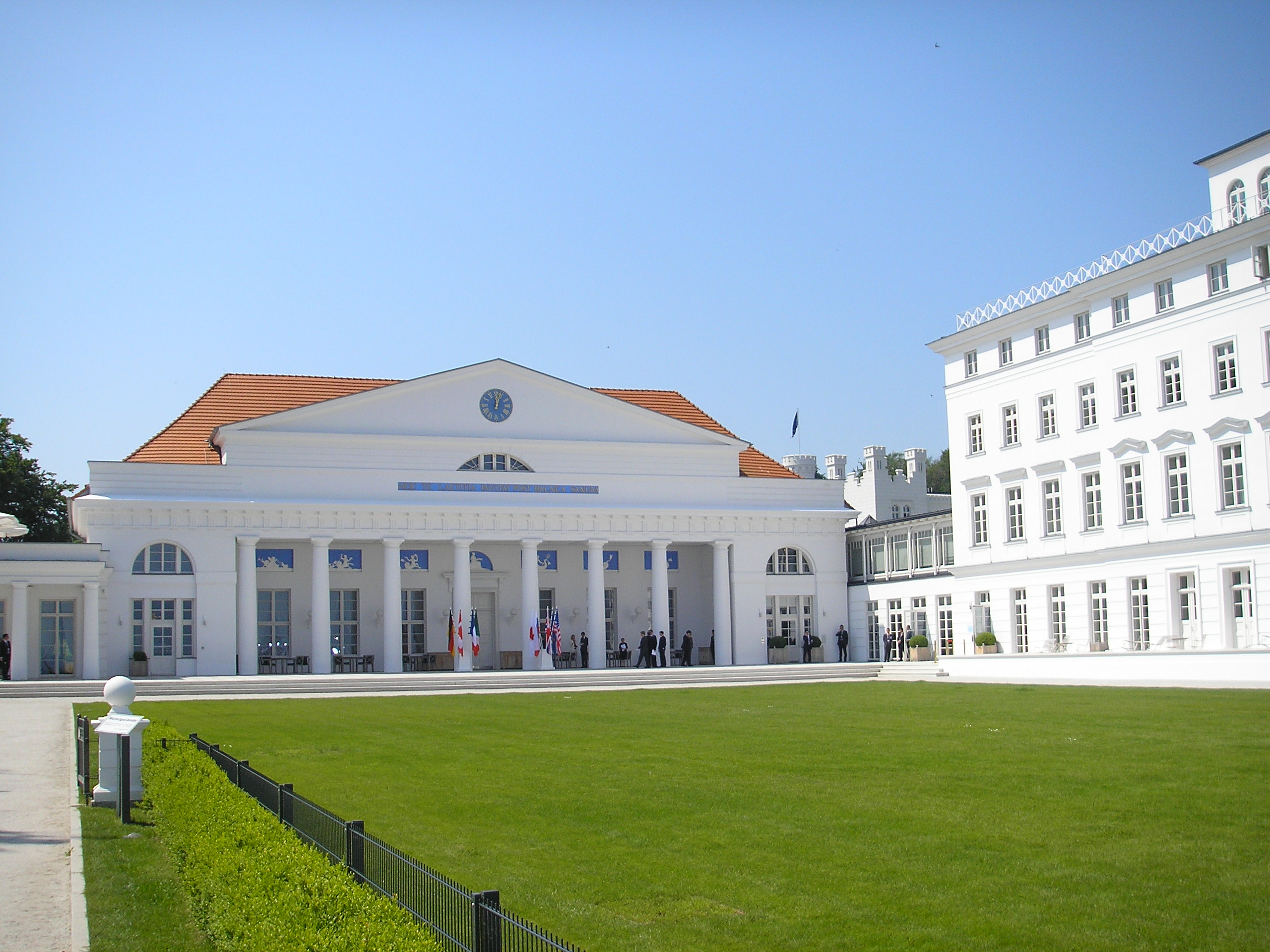
Kurhaus Heiligendamm, 2007

From 1810 to 1813, albeit with some difficulties, he build several pavilions, particularly the Große Pavillon as a music pavilion at the Kamp.

In 1814, Severin was commissioned to build a representative building as a social, dance and dining house in Heiligendamm. It was completed in 1817. Today, this building, the Kurhaus Heilingendamm, is a part of a hotel complex.

Carl Theodor Severin was appointed Oberlandbaumeister in March 1819.

His last works in Doberan included an annex to the salon building at Kamp from 1819 to 1821 and the Stahlbad, which was completed in 1825. Friedrich Franz I wished to erect a palace for the crown prince on Severins estate. Severin traded his residence which was situated south of the Kamp for a plot of land on the same road and erected a representative building there in 1823–1824. This house is now called Haus Gottesfrieden.

A major element of Severin's design and architecture was the exotic motifs of Chinese architecture. Thanks to him Bad Doberan is one of the few places in Germany today with a uniform classic architectural style.

In 1822, he built a new building on the Körchow estate. He also built the house of Italian-born chef Gaetano Medini.

He retired in 1835, and died in Doberan one year later.

== Important projects and buildings ==
=== In Bad Doberan ===
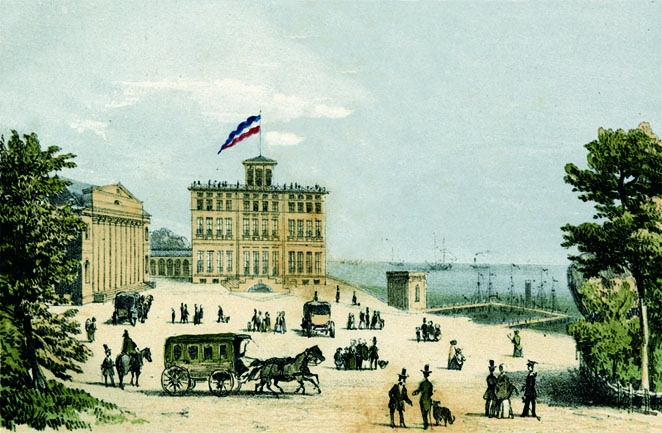
Salon and bathhouse in Heiligendamm (ca. 1841)

- Kleiner Pavillon auf dem Kamp, 1808–1809
- (Groß-) Herzogliches Palais, 1806–1809
- (Groß-) Herzogliches Salongebäude, 1801–1802
- Großer Pavillon, 1810–1813
- Kleines Palais, 1810–1813
- Prinzenpalais (Bad Doberan) 1821–1822
- Haus Gottesfrieden 1823–1824
- Stahlbad (Bad Doberan) 1825

=== In Heiligendamm ===
- Gesellschafts-, Tanz- und Speisehaus (heute Kurhalle) in Heiligendamm, 1814–1816

=== In Rostock ===
- Neue Wache, 1823
