= Gaetano Medini =

Italian-born German chef (1772–1857)

- Born: 1772; Milan, Duchy of Milan
- Died: 8 January 1857 (aged 84–85); Doberan, North German Confederation
- Occupation: Chef

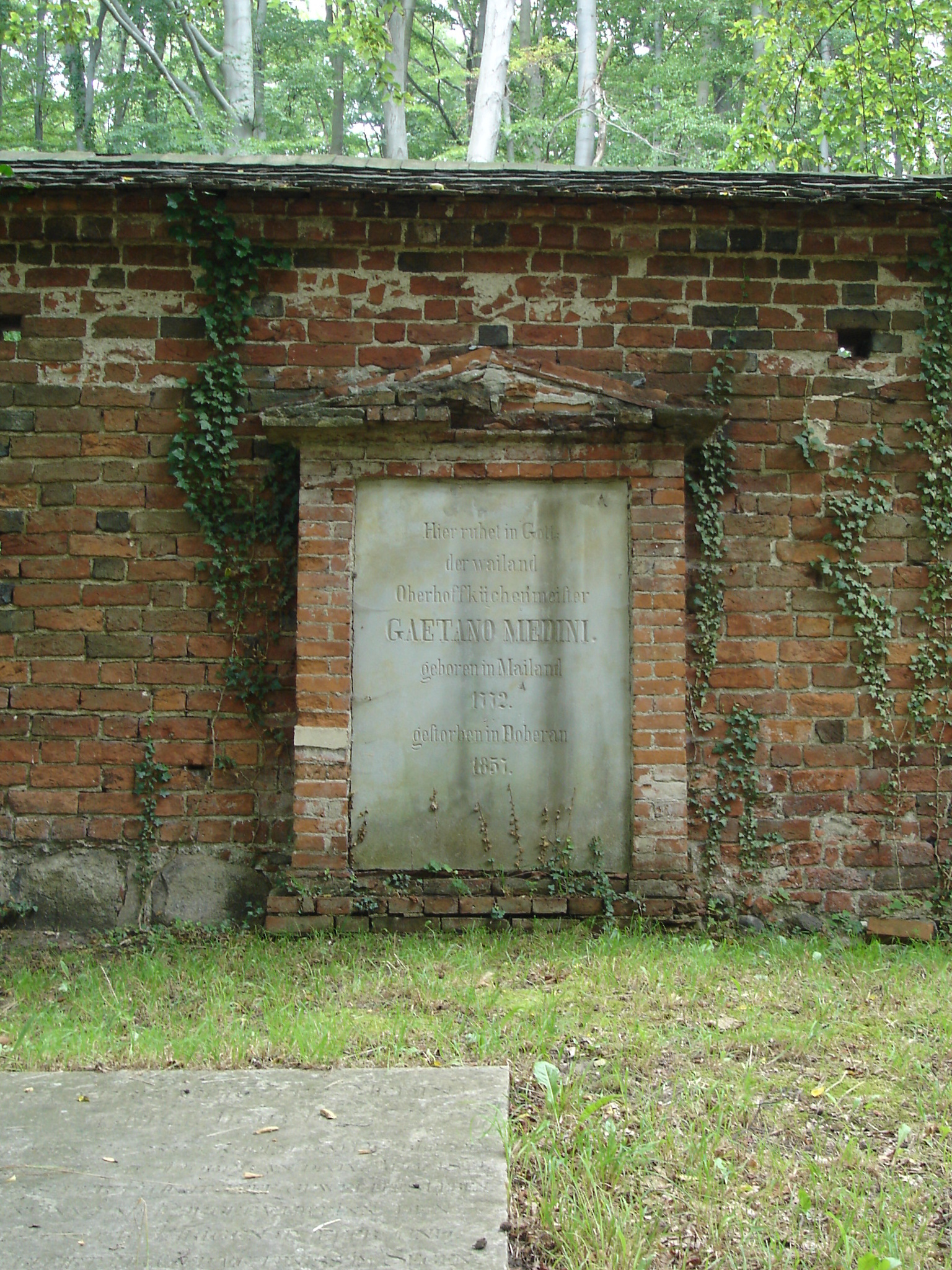
Medinis grave on the monastery grounds

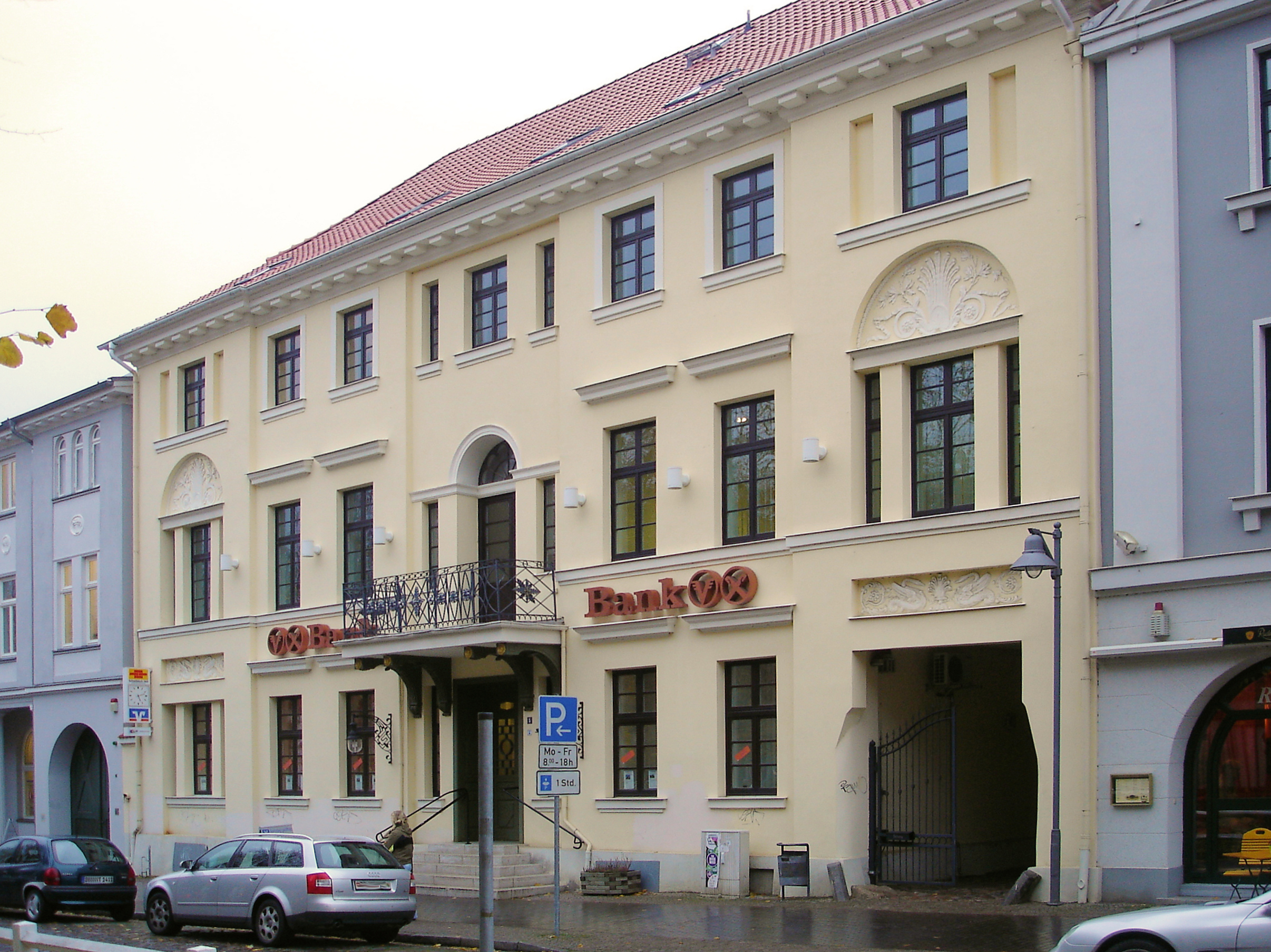
Medini's house on Severinstraße

Gaetano Medini (1772, Milan – 8 January 1857, Doberan, Germany) was an Italian-born German chef. In his time, he was well-known beyond the borders of Italy and was hired for the court of Mecklenburg.

== Life ==
Medini was hired as a personal chef, sometime after 1800 by the Grand Duchy of Mecklenburg-Schwerin, to the court of later grand Duke of Mecklenburg-Schwerin, Friedrich Franz I. He received the title of chief chef. He was the head of the kitchens in the residence and later, during the annual summer residence of the ducal family in Doberan, also set up tents near the pavilions at the Kamp. Medini was married to a Swedish woman Maria (1766–1821). The architect Carl Theodor Severin, who was responsible for realizing many of the buildings in Heiligendamm and Doberan, built a house for Medini around 1825 near the Kamp on today's Severinstrasse. Medini lived in this house until his death in 1857. The building still exists and is now a monument.

Medini, who later became Gustav Medini, was a member of the Freimaurerloge St. Andreas. He was buried on the site of the Doberan Abbey at the eastern wall. The stone slab, which is surrounded by bricks, is crowned by the remains of a classic gable.
