= Hans Heyck =

Swen Hans Wilhelm Heyck (19 September 1891 in Freiburg, Baden – 24 June 1972 in Kempfenhausen, Bavaria) was a German writer and poet. He sometimes used the pen name Harro Loothmann.

== Life ==
Hans Heyck was a son of the historian and editor Eduard Heyck (1862–1941), a son-in-law of the journalist and editor (Norddeutshe Allgemeine Zeitung) Otto Runge (1864–1940), a grandson of the novelist and poet Wilhelm Jensen (1837–1911), a great-grandson of the mayor of the city of Kiel, finance minister of Schleswig-Holstein and administrator (Landvogt) of the island of Sylt, Schwen Hans Jensen (1795–1855), and a great-grandson of the journalist, writer and literary historian Johann August Moritz Brühl (1819–1877). After stays in Freiburg, Heidelberg, Donaueschingen and Munich, he attended "Gymnasien" (classical high schools) in Bad Doberan, Berlin and Munich and graduated in 1910. After a three-year internship at an import-export company in Hamburg, he emigrated in 1913 to Argentina; he returned to Germany, however, in the fall of 1914 after the start of First World War and served first with an artillery unit and later as a pilot and flight instructor in France and West Prussia. He was decorated with the Iron Cross Second Class and awarded a "Purple Heart". In the Second World War Heyck was drafted into the German Luftwaffe and served with an anti-aircraft unit. He married in 1916 and had four children.

After working in various occupations, among others as a full-time employee of the German National People's Party in East Frisia, a hobby farmer in Bavaria and teacher at an agricultural college in Diez, Heyck in 1931 became a full-time writer in Bad Aibling and from 1935 also in Reit im Winkl. He joined the Nazi Party in 1931.

== Writings ==
Heyck began to publish poems and short stories during the First World War (1914–18). Starting in 1925 there followed contemporary, later historical novels which dealt mainly with Prussian history. His most successful novels were Friedrich Wilhelm I., Der Grosse Kurfürst von Brandenburg, Der Grosse König, and Das Welpennest, Ein Buch von Siedlern, Tieren und Kindern." In total his books had sales of about 500,000 copies, almost all before 1945. After 1945 his novels were not very popular; the only substantial published work after 1945 was Clausewitz. Ein Lebens- und Zeitbild with a printing of 5,000 copies. In 2018 a translation of 'Pegasus im Paradies' was published under the title 'Happiness in Bavaria".

Heyck was also a poet and was awarded the "Ring of Honor for the German Poem of 1955".
