= Zappanale =

Annual music festival outside Bad Doberan, Germany

Coordinates: 54°07′22″N 11°52′04″E

- Genre: Rock; jazz; experimental
- Dates: Weekend in July
- Locations: Bad Doberan, Germany
- Years active: 1989–present
- Founders: Arf-Society
- Website: zappanale.de

Zappanale is an annual music festival held outside Bad Doberan, a German town previously part of East Germany. The festival was first held in 1990, and the program features various bands performing the music of the late composer and guitarist Frank Zappa, and other "music outside the norm". Many musicians who played with Zappa have performed at the festival over the years.

== Background ==
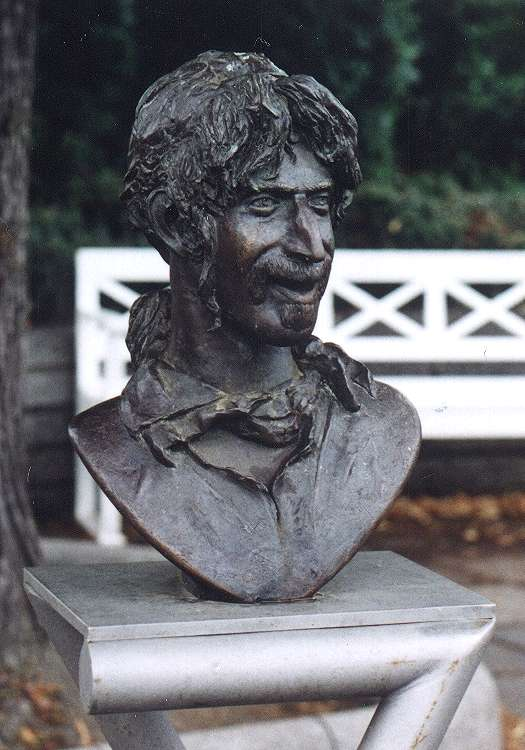
Bust of Frank Zappa in Bad Doberan

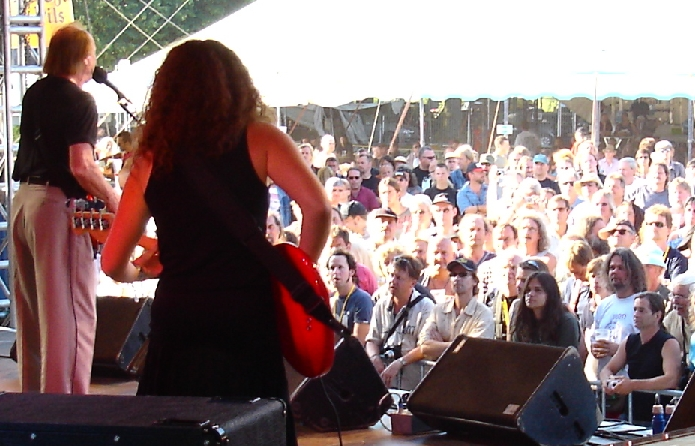
Zappanale 2006

Many of the festival's organizers originate from East Germany, and grew up in a period where Zappa's music was considered unacceptable by several Eastern European communist countries. One of the festival's founders, Wolfhard Kutz, was persecuted by the East German secret police, the Stasi, for being a Zappa fan. When the German government granted citizens access to their Stasi files in 1992, Kutz learned that his file stated that he "knows how to influence the youth with Zappa". When the Berlin Wall fell in 1989, Kutz could openly enjoy his passion for Zappa's music, and he founded the fan club "Arf-Society". The Zappanale premiered the year after, as what was just an extended party with only one band playing some Zappa songs. Since then, the festival has grown, with an annual attendance around 2,000. The festival is organized by the non-profit Arf Society, which has been a registered association since 1993.

In 2002, the organizers helped raise money to have Czech sculptor Václav Česák make a bronze bust of Zappa, which is now placed in the centre of Bad Doberan.

== Lawsuit ==
In November 2007, the festival was sued by the heirs of Frank Zappa, the Zappa Family Trust, for use of the Zappa name and image without permission. Court hearings were held in Düsseldorf in August 2008, and the involved parties were given time to reach an out-of-court settlement. In January 2009, the court ruled against Zappa's heirs for lack of proof that they actively used their trademarks in Germany. Such activity was assessed as a prerequisite for winning the lawsuit.
