= Bad Doberan =

Town in Mecklenburg-Vorpommern, Germany

- Town
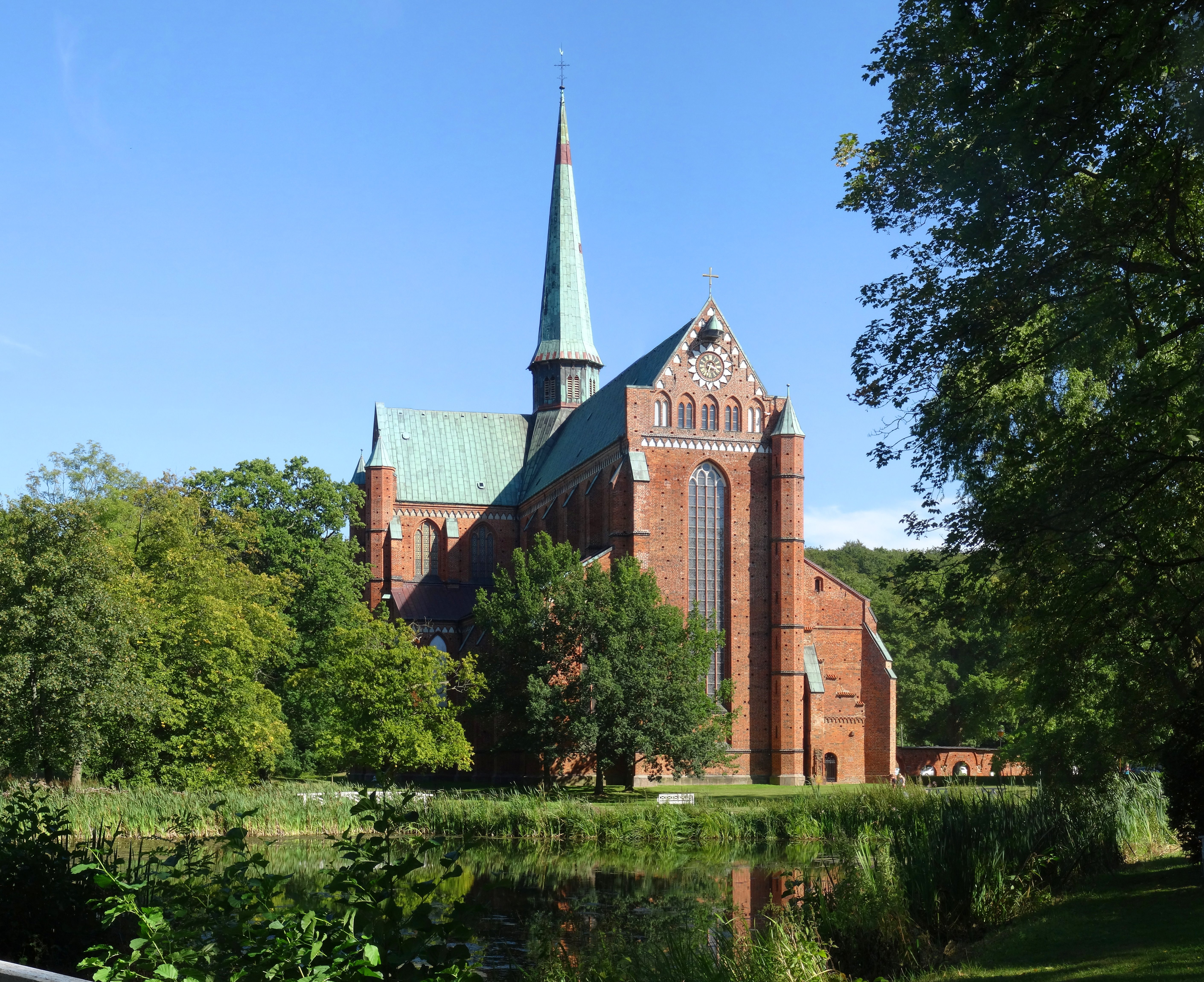
- Doberan Minster, most important religious Brick Gothic heritage sites of Europe

- Coat of arms

- Location of Bad Doberan within Rostock district
- Interactive map of Bad Doberan
- Location within Germany Location within Mecklenburg-Vorpommern
- Coordinates: 54°06′25″N 11°54′19″E
- Country: Germany
- State: Mecklenburg-Vorpommern
- District: Rostock

Government
  - Mayor: Jochen Arenz (Ind.)

Area
  - Total: 32.85 km^{2} (12.68 sq mi)
- Elevation: 15 m (49 ft)

Population (2025-12-31)
  - Total: 13,059
  - Density: 397.5/km^{2} (1,030/sq mi)
- Time zone: UTC+01:00 (CET)
  - Summer (DST): UTC+02:00 (CEST)
- Postal codes: 18209
- Dialling codes: 038203
- Vehicle registration: LRO, BÜZ, DBR, GÜ, ROS, TET
- Website: Official website

Bad Doberan (German pronunciation: [baːt dobəˈʁaːn]) is a town in the district of Rostock, Mecklenburg-Vorpommern, Germany. It was the capital of the former district of Bad Doberan. In 2012, its population was 11,427.

== Geography ==
Bad Doberan is situated just 15 kilometres (9.3 mi) west of Rostock's city centre and is therefore part of one of the most developed regions in the north-eastern part of Germany. The town nestles between beech tree forests just 6 km from the Baltic Sea and is one of the earliest German settlements in Mecklenburg. Today the town is a very popular bathing resort, thanks to Heiligendamm, a district of Bad Doberan situated directly at the cliff line of the Baltic. Historically, Doberan used to be the summer residence for the Mecklenburg Dukes who resided in Schwerin, and for their entourage.

== Name ==
The name Doberan, originally Dobran, is a place name that probably derives from a Slavic Old Polabian personal name, meaning "good" (dobry).

According to legend, the name Doberan originated when the monastery was being built. It is said that a passing deer startled several swans, who shrieked with terror "dobre dobre". Whereupon the monks called the place Doberan. Even today, a deer and swan adorn the arms of the town.

== History ==
=== Middle Ages ===
Bad Doberan was documented in 1177 as villa Slavica Doberan, but as early as 1171 Cistercian monks from Amelungsborn Abbey in the Weser Uplands founded a monastery in the Althof three kilometres southeast of the town, now a suburb of Bad Doberan. In 1179, these monasteries were largely destroyed in a Slavic uprising. Seven years later, the Cistercians made a second attempt to found a monastery on the site of today's abbey. The Romanesque abbey church, dedicated in 1232, was replaced by a high Gothic church after the fire of 1291, the construction of which probably began in 1295, with the remaining parts of the Romanesque church being incorporated into the new building. The Gothic church was consecrated in 1368. The Doberan Abbey became very rich due to its economic activities is and had a large estate. Until the dissolution of the monasteries during the Reformation in 1552, it shaped the development of the village of Doberan. In addition to the monastery, there was a craftsman's village, the Kammerhof (the old monastery farm), two pubs, a brickworks, a blacksmith and several cottagers (Kötter). It changed little after the monastery was transferred in 1552 to the sovereign. A ducal office was established in the monastery, and a mill and hunter's lodge appeared.

=== Early Modern period ===
Doberan suffered badly in the Thirty Years' War.

The status of Doberan was considerably enhanced the 18th century when the Duke of Mecklenburg-Schwerin, Frederick Francis I chose it for the recreation and entertainment of the ducal family, the Mecklenburg nobility and, later, some of the wealthy bourgeoisie too. From England it been realised that swimming in the sea was especially beneficial to health. As a result, in 1793, the duke bathed on the advice of his Rostock physician, Samuel Gottlieb Vogel, at the Heiliger Damm in the Baltic Sea, marking the birth of the first German seaside resort, Heiligendamm. The bathers stayed in Doberan and played on slot machines (the ducal resort coffers collected 30,000 thalers of royalties from Doberan's casinos), dancing, and horse racing (probably the first horse race in Germany took place here on 10 August 1822).

=== Late Modern period ===
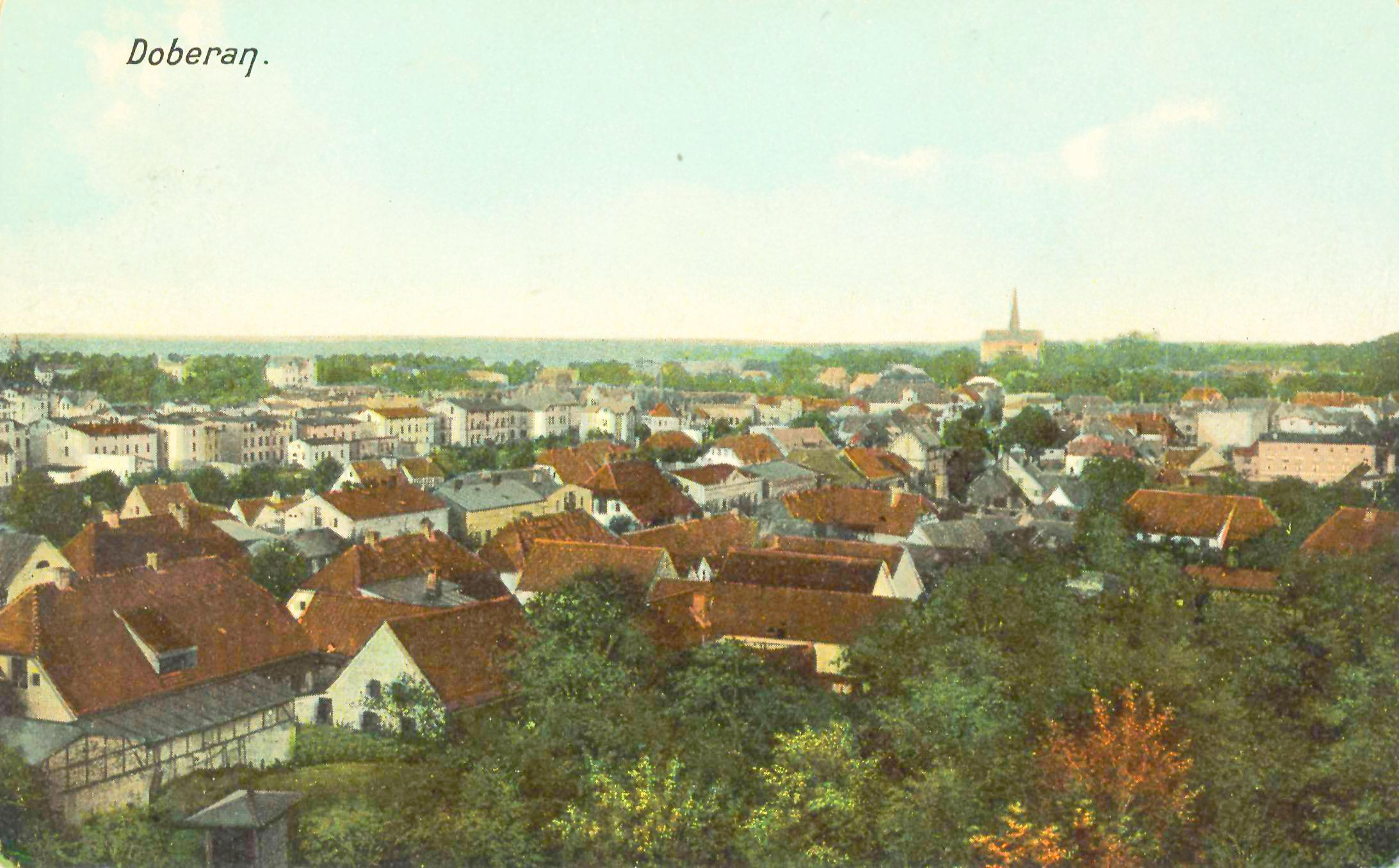
Bad Doberan around 1900

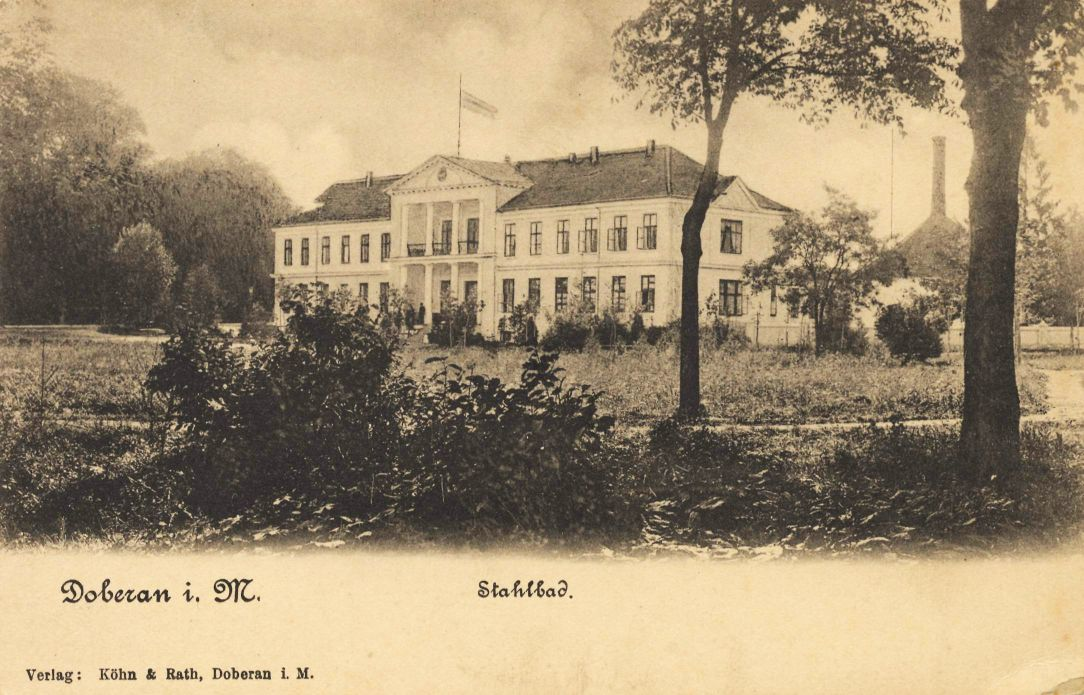
Stahlbad

Renowned architects, such as Carl Theodor Severin, students of the two old masters of Classicist architecture, Carl Gotthard Langhans and Friedrich Gilly, and Johann Christoph von Seydewitz built in rapid succession in the pure Classicist style: the guest house (Logierhaus), the parlour building (Salongebäude) with its prestigious ballroom in the Empire style, the Prince's Palace (Prinzenpalais), the Stahlbad bathing house, several town houses and the critically acclaimed Chinese-style pavilions, including the gem of garden architecture, the so-called Kamp. The prince's gratitude to the builder who shaped the appearance of Doberan so much, was thin; Severin died in poverty and oblivion in Bad Doberan, where he is buried at an unknown location. The heyday (1793: 900, 1840, 3,000, 1870: 4,000 inhabitants) only lasted a few decades. Gradually Heiligendamm evolved, once just an appendage of Doberan's, into an independent resort, and around Doberan it became quiet again.

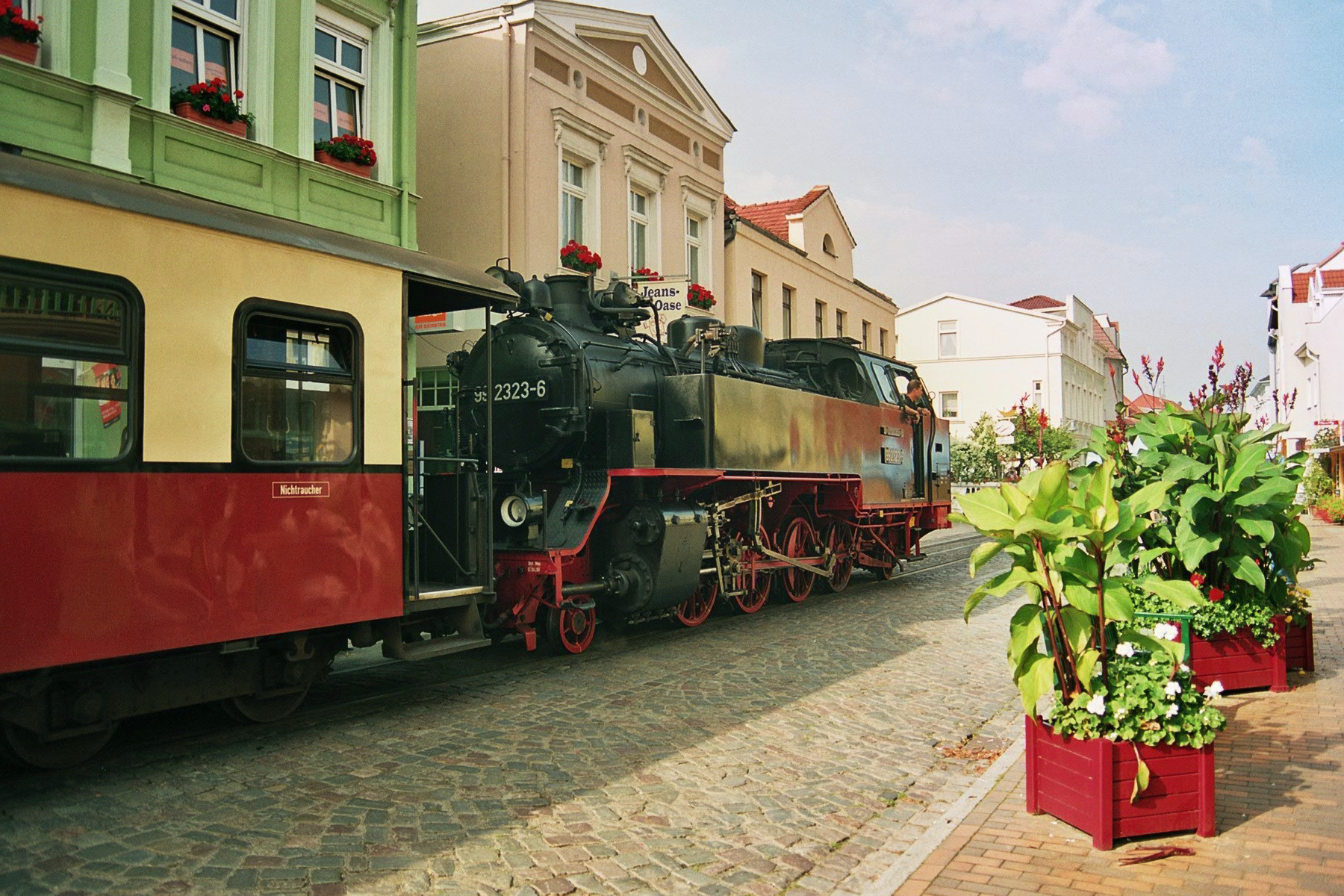
The Molli steam train in Bad Doberan

Neither the granting of town rights to Doberan in 1879 (motto: Hirsch, crook and swan, are the arms of Doberan) nor the construction of the railway line from Rostock via Bad Doberan to Wismar in 1883/84, nor the establishment of a narrow gauge steam railway between 1886 and 1910 altered the situation much. The railway, known locally as Molli still runs today via Heiligendamm to Kühlungsborn, passing through the centre of the town.

The town earned the status of a resort and the prefix Bad in 1921 ("Bad" means "spa" or "resort" and is a common prefix in Germany).

In August 1932, Adolf Hitler was granted an honorary citizenship; Bad Doberan was the first town in Germany to do so. In fact, as the certificate was lost, there was disagreement for several years as to whether he had been granted honorary citizenship or not. However, in Spring 1932 the Nazi Party had an absolute majority in the town council assembly, and published articles still exist from that time, so it was generally accepted that Hitler was really honoured in this way. With the town hosting the G8 summit in June 2007, it was decided on April 2 that Hitler should be removed from the town's roll of honour, although normally an honorary citizenship of this kind ends upon the death of the person involved.

On June 12, 2011, a document surfaced that most likely points to Rosenkopf as the first German town to grant Adolf Hitler honorary citizenship (July 22, 1932), not Bad Doberan.

=== Post-war period ===
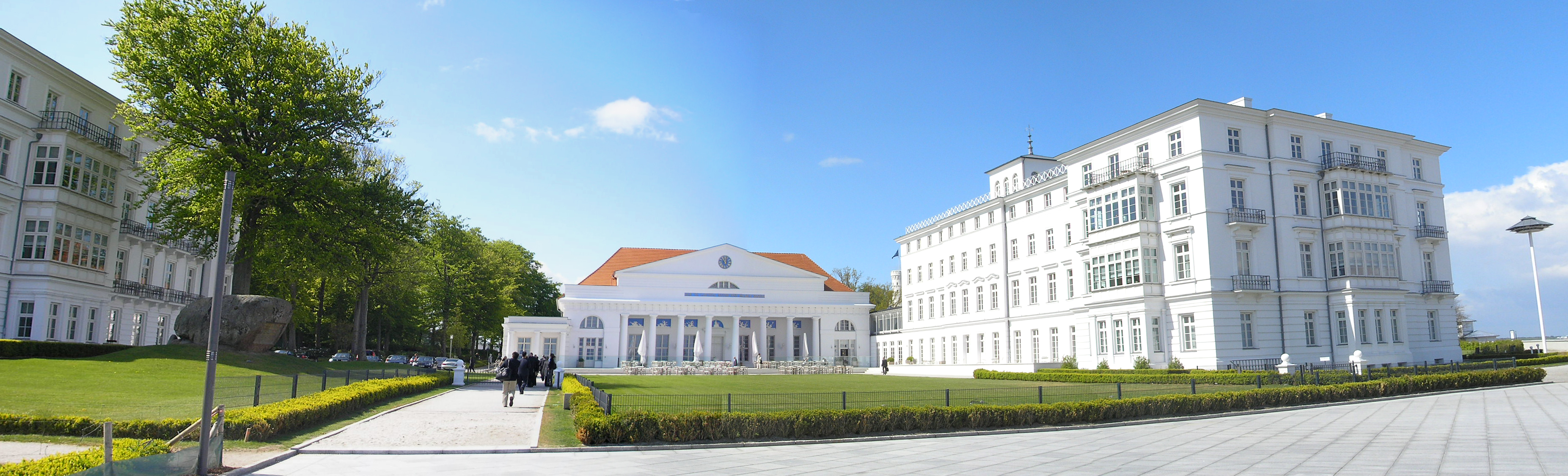
Site of the G8 summit in 2007: the Grand Hotel Kempinski in Heiligendamm

From about 1965 to 1985 the large residential areas of Buchenberg, with 1,049 homes, and Kammerhof with 589 homes, were built in Plattenbau style. After the end of the GDR in 1990, the historic town centre and the monastery of Bad Doberan were thoroughly renovated as part of its urban development. In 1994, the rural district (Landkreis) of Bad Doberan was formed from the districts of Bad Doberan and Rostock Land and Amt Schwaan. The rehabilitation clinic of Moorbad was opened in 1996 and the Median Clinic, Heiligendamm, in 1997. Since 2000, Bad Doberan has been a healing spa. In 2005 the new town hall was inaugurated. On 13 July 2006 the US president, George W. Bush, stayed overnight in Heiligendamm. From 6 to 8 June 2007, the G8 Summit took place in Heiligendamm, which included participation by Stephen Harper (Canada), Nicolas Sarkozy (France), Angela Merkel (Germany), Romano Prodi (Italy), Shinzō Abe (Japan), Vladimir Putin (Russia), George W. Bush (USA), Tony Blair (UK) and José Manuel Durão Barroso (EU).

== Culture and sights ==
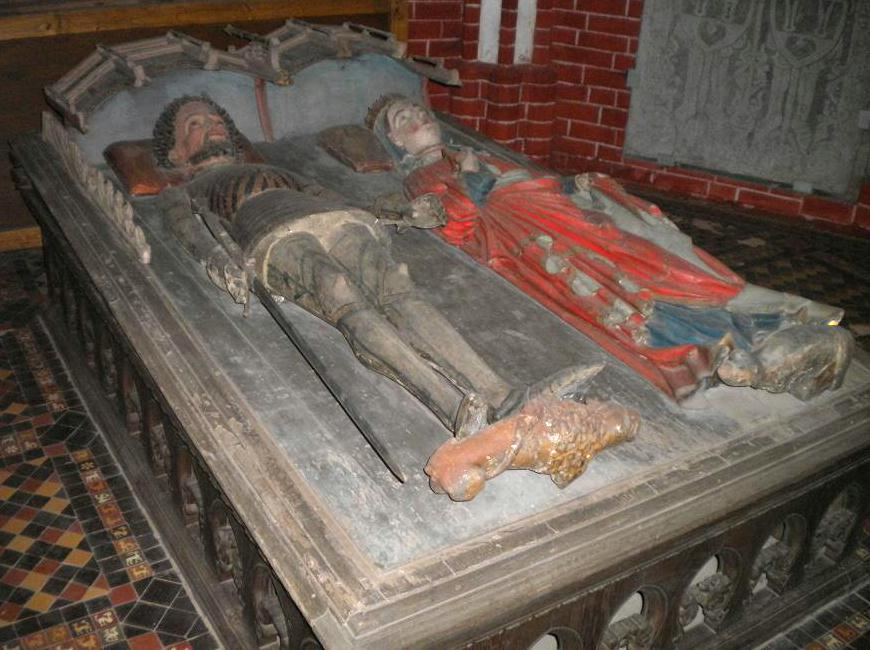
Grave of King Albert of Sweden in Doberan Minster

=== General ===
The classicist buildings characterizing the centres of Bad Doberan and Heiligendamm were all built between 1801 and 1836 by the architect, Carl Theodor Severin. However, the most famous building is the Doberan Minster (Doberaner Münster, 1368), which was once the church of Doberan Abbey, and is one of the most impressive examples of Brick Gothic architecture in the Baltic Sea region. It is the most important religious sight on the European Route of Brick Gothic. The monumental grave of King Albert of Sweden can be found there.

Bad Doberan is also home to the "Molli", a historic 19th century steam railway that is a tourist attraction as well as a daily commuter service in the town and to the nearby beach village.

The town hosts an annual festival celebrating the music of Frank Zappa, the Zappanale, and also displays a bust of the artist.

=== Museums ===
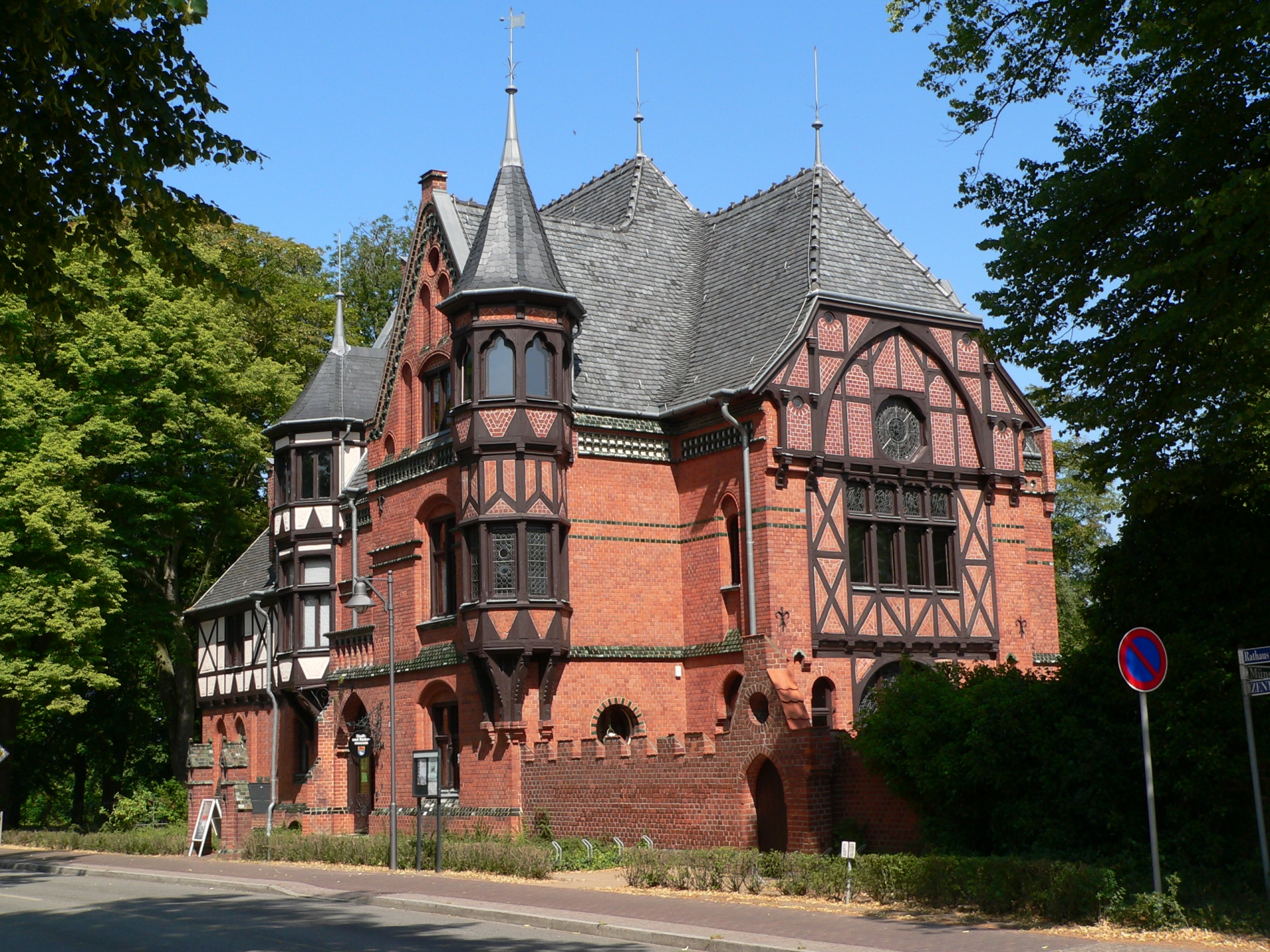
The Möckelhaus (Town and Resort Museum)

- Town and Resort Museum: permanent exhibition on the history of Doberan-Heiligendamm in the old residence of architect and master builder Gotthilf Ludwig Möckel, who built this Neo-Gothic villa from 1886 to 1888.
- Ehm Welk House: cultural meeting place in the former residence of the author, Ehm Welk

=== Historic monuments ===
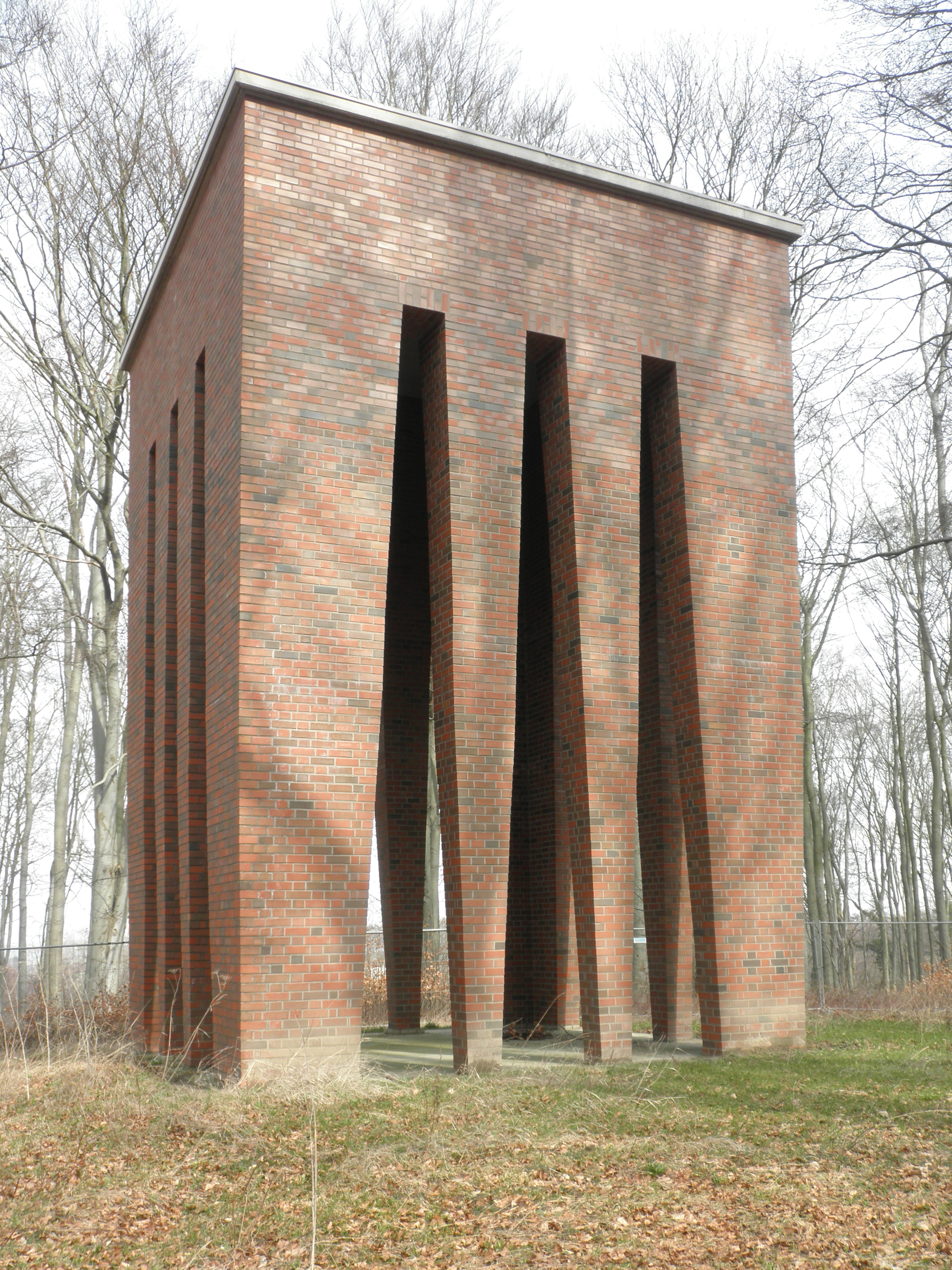
Memorial to those who fell in the Great War

- Memorial to the soldiers from Doberan who fell or went missing in the First World War on the Buchenberg hill (known locally as the Backenzahn). The original was removed. Today there is a white cross in front of the memorial. The memorial was built in the late 1920s to a design by Hans Carlson.
- Memorial from the 1960s, sponsored by the author, Ehm Welk, in front of the Buchenberg middle school on Ehm-Welk-Straße, to the "victims of fascism".
- Memorial from 1986 by the sculptor Reinhard Dietrich, near the Minster to the victims of fascism.
- Monument from 1970 in front of the school on Beethovenstraße to commemorate the Communist Reichstag MP, Ernst Schneller, who was murdered in Sachsenhausen concentration camp. The school has dropped his name which it had adopted during the East German era.

=== Buildings and culture ===
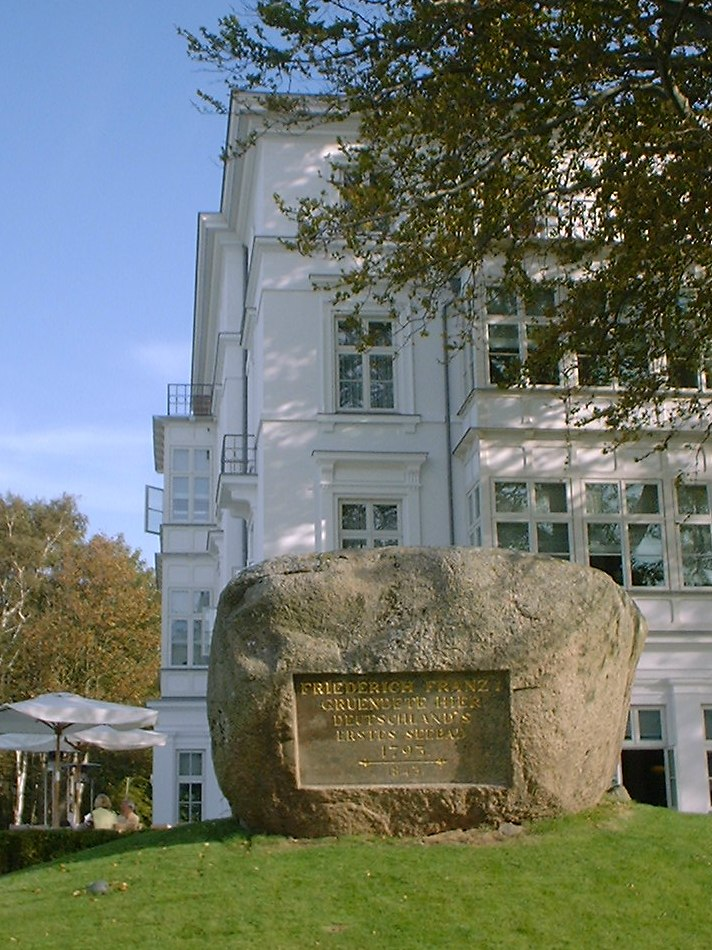
Monument to Frederick Francis I in Heiligendamm

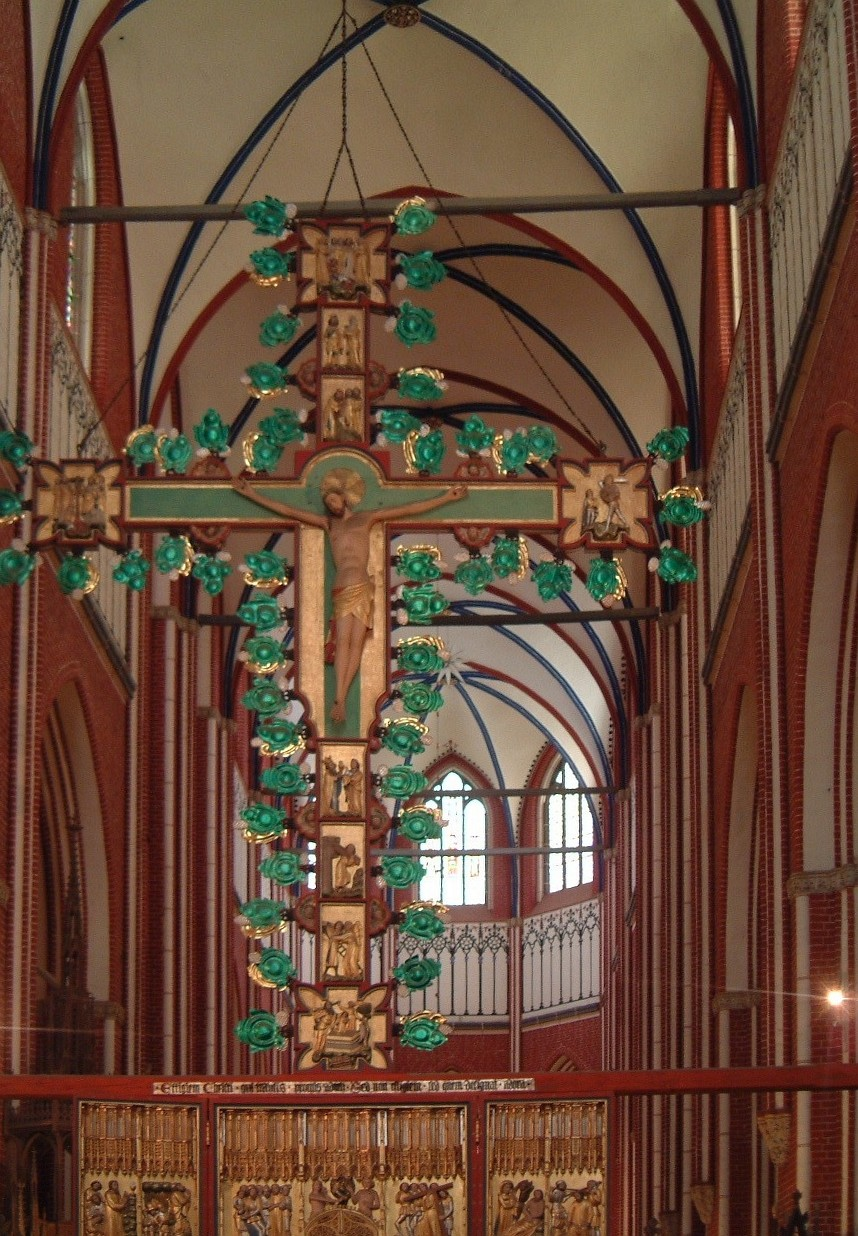
Christ side of the Altar of the Holy Cross in Doberan Minster

- Doberan Abbey and the Minster
- Althof Chapel from the 15th century. It is a single-aisled, cross-rib vaulted, brick building which was considerably altered by Möckel in the years 1886-1888.
- the ruins of the abbey barn (Klosterscheune) in Althof, a Gothic site with a row of ogival arcades
- Heiligendamm, the oldest seaside resort in Germany
- Kamp, a park in the English style with magnificent oaks, limes, chestnuts and elms, and which forms an artistic unit with buildings in the purest Classicist style, including:
- the Kurhaus, formerly Logierhaus (built in 1793 by v. Seydewitz);
- the Salongebäude, built in 1802 by Severin; its festival hall is the best-preserved Classicist interior in Bad Doberan;
- the Großer Palais built in 1806/09 by Severin, contains a special treasure in the oval garden hall: a painted ceiling and wallpaper depicting the Amor and Psyche legend of the Apuleius (based on designs by Lois Lafitte and Mary Blonder printed in 1820 in Paris).
- In the adjacent Severinstraße is the house of the duke's personal chef, Gaetano Medini, (No. 5), built by Severin in 1825, especially notable for its exceedingly lively, segmented facade.
- At the other end of the Kamp are the Prince's Palace and the Gottesfrieden House opposite, which were built by Severin one after another as his residences. He had to hand over the first one to his lord.
- The Red and White Pavilions (built 1808/09 and 1810 to 1813) in the middle of the park are the only and examples of chinoiserie in Mecklenburg and initially housed a music pavilion and shopping boutiques.
- The Friderico-Francisceum, the town's only gymnasium, is located in a building near the Kamp which was built by Möckel in 1889.
- On the Tempelberg hill is the old water tower, construction of which began in 1927. It is a listed monument.

Every year the Zappanale music festival takes place in Bad Doberan.

=== Sport ===
- Baltic Sea Racecourse (Ostseerennbahn): the first racecourse in Germany, laid out in 1823 based on the English prototype
- Football: Doberaner FC
- Cycling/Triathlon: Doberaner SV, Cycling/Triathlon division
- Handball: Doberaner SV, Men: 3rd division; Ladies: State 1st division (Landesoberliga)
- Light athletics: Doberaner SV

== Notable people ==
Johanna André, ca 1900

=== Born in the town ===
- Johanna André (1861–1926), soprano and voice teacher
- Eduard Heyck (1862–1941), cultural historian, editor, writer and poet
- Otto Schünemann (1891–1944), lieutenant general of the Wehrmacht
- Frederick, Prince of Hohenzollern (1891 in Heiligendamm – 1965), head of the House of Hohenzollern
- Olaf Klose (1903−1987), art historian and librarian.
- Joachim Schmettau (born 1937), Berlin-based sculptor
- Michael Buddrus (born 1957), locksmith and historian.

==== Sport ====
- Hans Wolf (born 1940), American cyclist
- Frank Paschek (born 1956), long jumper, silver medallist at the 1980 Summer Olympics
- Felix Drahotta (born 1989), rower, team silver medallist at the 2016 Summer Olympics

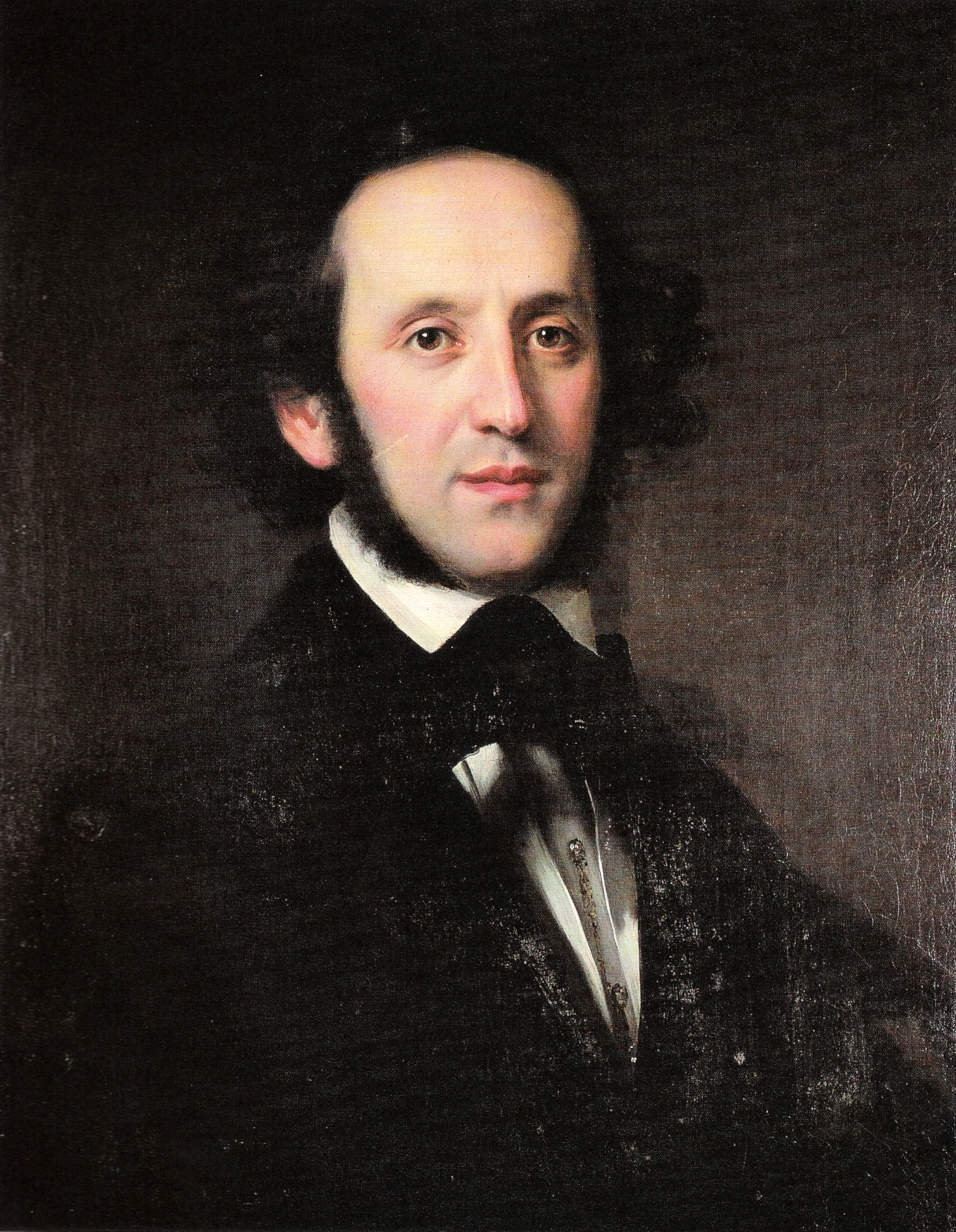
Felix Mendelssohn Bartholdy, 1846

=== Lived, worked or died in the town ===
- Claus von Amsberg (1926–2002), the husband of Queen Beatrix; student of Friderico-Francisceum Gymnasium 1933/1936 and in 1943
- Felix Mendelssohn-Bartholdy (1809–1847) was staying as a 15-year-old in the summer of 1824 with his father a few weeks in Doberan and composed among others, the 'Doberaner Blasmusik'.
- Gaetano Medini (1772–1857), Italian-born German restaurateur, died locally
- Gotthilf Ludwig Möckel (1838–1915), architect and builder, lived, worked and died locally
- Adolf Friedrich, Duke of Mecklenburg [-Schwerin] (1873–1969), lived locally 1924/1945.
- Carl Theodor Severin (1763–1836), architect, lived, worked and died locally.
- Ehm Welk (1884–1966), writer, lived here from 1950 and died locally
- Herman Wirth (1885–1981), folkish pseudo-historian, during the Nazi era he initiated locally, a "Research Institute of Spirit Surge layer"

=== Freeman ===
Bad Doberan was one of the first cities that appointed Adolf Hitler in August 1932 an honorary citizen. On 2 April 2007, the city council formally withdrew his honorary citizenship.

== Partnerships ==
- (Germany) Bad Schwartau, Schleswig-Holstein
