= Eduard Heyck =

German cultural historian, editor, writer and poet

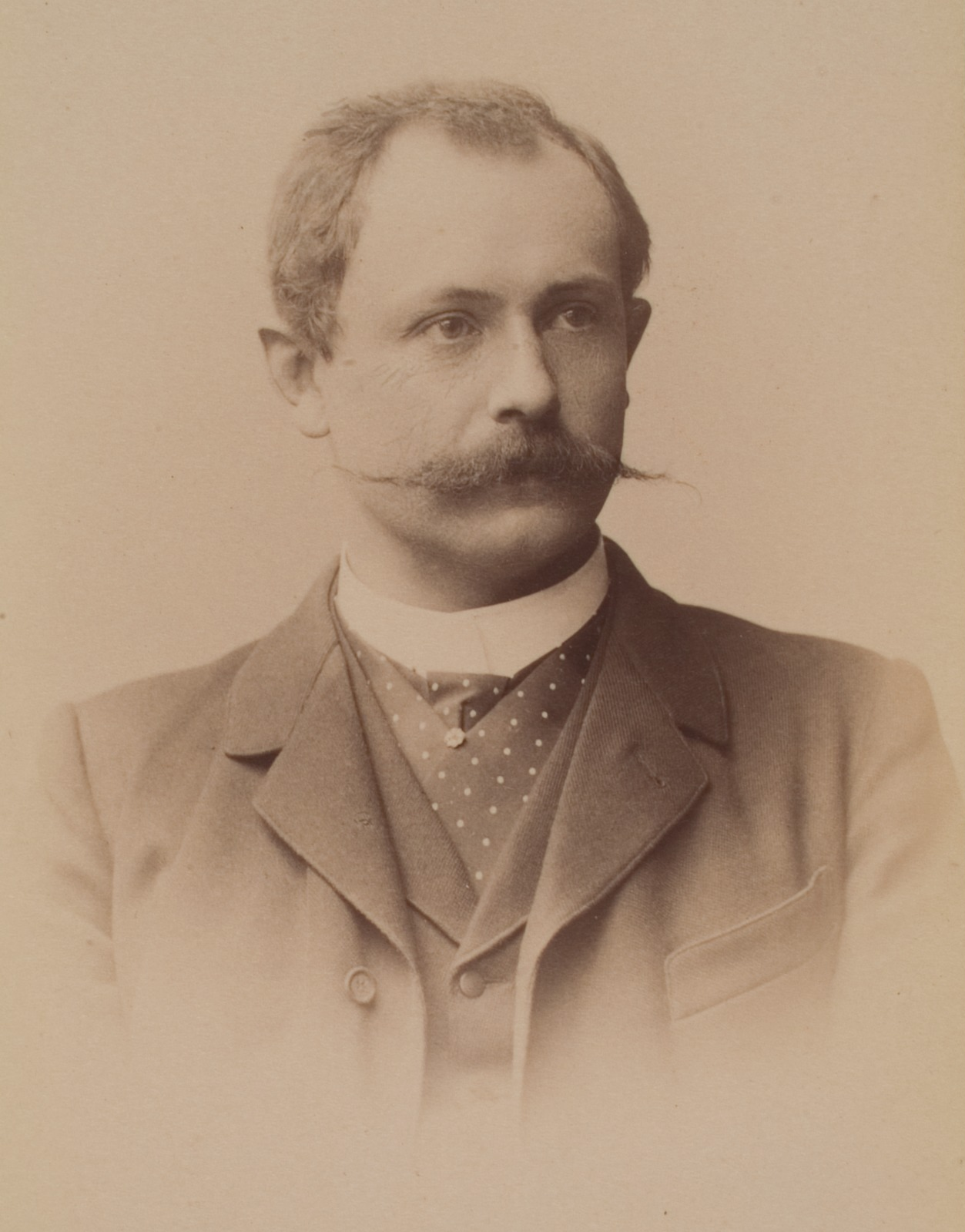
- University Library Heidelberg, from 1885 until 1898
- Born: 30 May 1862; Bad Doberan, Grand Duchy of Mecklenburg-Schwerin
- Died: 11 July 1941 (aged 79); Ermatingen, Switzerland
- Occupations: German cultural historian, editor, writer and poet

Eduard Heyck (30 May 1862 – 11 July 1941) was a German cultural historian, editor, writer and poet.

== Family ==
Eduard Karl Heinrich Berthold Heyck was born at Doberan, Grand Duchy of Mecklenburg-Schwerin, the son of the retired garden center owner Eduard Heyck (1836–1903). He was a son-in-law of the writer and poet Wilhelm Jensen (1837–1911) and the father of Hans Heyck (1891–1972) and Prof. Dr. med. Hartwig Heyck (1912–1982). His first wife, Maina Heyck-Jensen (1870–1940), was a painter and occasional writer. Eduard Heyck studied comparative philology, history and art history at Leipzig, Jena and Heidelberg.

After a PhD. thesis judged "summa cum laude" entitled "Genua und seine Marine im Zeitalter der Kreuzzüge" ("Genoa and its navy during the time of the Crusades") (1886) Heyck was appointed "Dozent", i.e. lecturer at Freiburg (Breisgau) university. In 1892 he returned to Heidelberg University as extraordinary professor for history; from the summer of 1896 until spring of 1898 he was Director of Archives at the Fürstlich-Fürstenberg Library and Archives in Donaueschingen.

Starting in 1898 he lived as an independent scholar in Munich and Berlin; in 1909 he moved to Ermatingen (Switzerland), where he died in 1941. Eduard Heyck was twice married and was the father of three sons ond one daughter.

== Career ==
Heyck was a historian, editor, writer and poet. As a young lecturer he was awarded a contract by the Baden Historical Commission to write "Die Geschichte der Herzoge von Zähringen" ("The history of the dukes of Zähringen", 1891).

This work is even now considered a basic text and is still being reprinted. Other well-known books by Heyck are a three-volume "Deutsche Geschichte" ("German History") and "Die Allgemeine Zeitung 1798–1898 ", a newspaper history (1898). Among the many other short and long works by Heyck are "Briefe einer Heidelberger Burschenschaft 1914/1918" ("Letters of a Heidelberg student association 1914/1918") and "Höhenfeuer. Ein deutsches Lesebuch" ("Mountain-peak fires. A German reader" – a collection of poetry). As independent scholar Heyck gave many speeches throughout Germany, took part in 1898 in the Palestine Expedition of Emperor William II, and in 1900 he travelled to Brazil on a lecture tour which was sponsored by the German ambassador, Count Arco. Eduard Heyck was an enthusiastic student corps member.

From 1893 until his death, i.e., for almost fifty years, he was the editor of the "Allgemeines Deutsches Kommersbuch" ("General German students´song book"), sometimes called the "Lahrer Kommersbuch" or ADK. Beside his work as an editor he contributed texts for some songs to the song book himself). During his editorship 450,000 copies of the book were printed. Heyck is probably best known as the first editor and sometime author of the "Monographien zur Weltgeschichte" ("Monographs of World History"), first published in 1897 by Velhagen and Klasing, which he edited for almost forty years. He also contributed several volumes to the "Künstler Monographien" ("Artists´ monographs") by the same publisher.

During his long life Heyck published dozens of articles on historical, cultural and artistic topics. He was also active as a bibliophile. From 1898 to 1900 he was chairman of the "Gesellschaft der Bibliophilen" ("Society of Bibliophiles"), which had been founded by Fedor von Zobeltitz, and belonged for several more years to the executive. For his 75th birthday Heyck received the "Goethe-Medaille für Kunst und Wissenschaft" ("Goethe Medal for Art and Science") from Adolf Hitler. He died, aged 79, at Ermatingen, Switzerland.

== Works by Eduard Heyck ==
=== As author ===
- 1885: Genua's Marine in ihrem Verhältniss zur Regierung der Stadt: Die ältere Verfassungsgeschichte Genua's
- 1886: Genua und seine Marine im Zeitalter der Kreuzzüge: Beiträge zur Verfassungs- und zur Kriegs-Geschichte
- 1886: Heidelberger Studentenleben zu Anfang unseres Jahrhunderts: nach Briefen und Akten
- 1888: Relatio de Heinrici VII. Imperatoris itinere italico
- 1889: Vaterlandslieder: die Dichtung der deutschen Träume und Kämpfe des neunzehnten Jahrhunderts
- 1891: Geschichte der Herzoge von Zähringen
- 1892: Urkunden, Siegel und Wappen der Herzoge von Zähringen
- 1895: Die Staatsverwaltung der Cherusker
- 1897: Die Mediceer
- 1898: Bismarck
- 1898: Kaiser Maximilian I.
- 1898: Die Allgemeine Zeitung 1798–1898: Beiträge zur Geschichte der deutschen Presse
- 1898–1900: Die Kreuzzüge und das heilige Land
- 1901: Friedrich I. und die Begründung des preußischen Königtums
- 1902: Frauenschönheit im Wandel von Kunst und Geschmack
- 1902: Der Große Kurfürst
- 1903: Hans von Bartels
- 1905: Anselm Feuerbach
- 1905: Maria Stuart, Königin von Schottland
- 1905/6: Deutsche Geschichte: Volk, Staat, Kultur und geistiges Leben (3 Bde)
- 1906: Geschichte des Kostüms (with Adolf Rosenberg)
- 1907: Johanna von Bismarck
- 1907: Moderne Kultur, ein Handbuch der Lebensbildung und des guten Geschmacks, in Verbindung mit ..... Hermann Hesse ..herausgegeben.
- 1908: Lukas Cranach
- 1908: Wilhelm von Oranien und die Entstehung der freien Niederlande
- 1909: Luther
- 1915: England und Holland
- 1917: Das Deutschland von Morgen
- 1918: Parlament oder Volksvertretung?
- 1919: Die Deutschen bis zur Mitte des 14. Jahrhunderts. Die Kelten.
- 1919: Briefe einer Heidelberger Burschenschaft 1914–1918
- 1920: Höhenfeuer
- 1927?: Das Ende der Flittermonde des Hei-ho
- 1928: Gaja
- 1933: Die Blutreinheit der Germanen

=== As editor ===
- 1892: 1941 "Allgemeines Deutsches Kommersbuch"
- 1920-1933/34: "Fortunatus", Blätter für das Studententum
- 1897: 1933 "Monographien zur Weltgeschichte". In Verbindung mit anderen

== General sources ==
- Dictionary of German Biography; Ludwig Bielschowsky, "Eduard Heyck – ein deutscher Gelehrter, Liederdichter und Bibliophile," in "Börsenblatt für den deutschen Buchhandel", Nr. 17, 27. February 1976, A39-42;
- Hans Heyck, "Zum Andenken an Prof. Dr. Eduard Heyck", in "Der Convent", Jahr 5, Heft 4, April 1954, 94–96; library catalogs (Internet).
