= Gotthilf Ludwig Möckel =

German architect

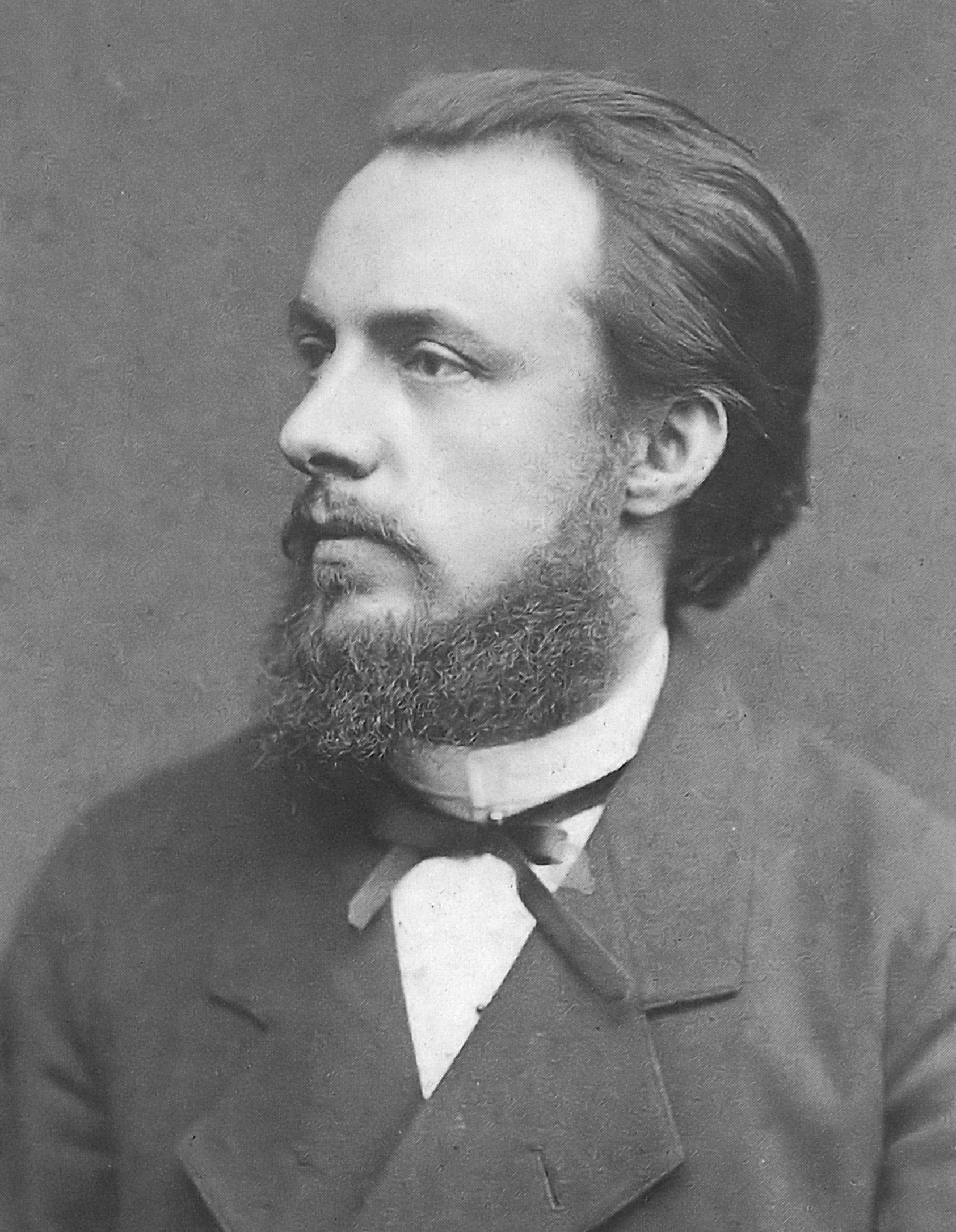
Gotthilf Ludwig Möckel (c.1875)

Gotthilf Ludwig Möckel or Ludwig Möckel (22 July 1838 in Zwickau – 26 October 1915 in Doberan) was a German architect

Möckel is notable for his design of Neo Gothic churches. These include the Johanneskirche and Erlöserkirche in Dresden, the Erlöserkirche and the Samariterkirche in Berlin and St John's Church in Smyrna (then in the Ottoman Empire).

== General information ==
=== Family ===
Gotthilf Ludwig Möckel was the first child of the Zwickau coppersmith Gotthilf Heinrich Möckel (1786-1847) and his second wife Caroline Rosine Möckel.

Möckel married on June 25, 1866, in Zwickau Emilie (Emmy) Amalie Christiane Schlegel (1844-1926), a daughter of the bricklayer of Göttingen and Senator Carl Schlegel (1819-1890). The couple had five sons and two daughters: Erwin (1867-1929), Johannes (1868-1936), Elsa (1870-1926), Erich (1871-1926), Hermann (1874-1948), Käthe (1878- 1954) and Ludwig (1881-1934).

=== Education and work ===
Möckel attended a public school from 1844 to 1852 in Zwickau. From 1852 to 1853, he attended the Royal Trade School in Chemnitz, then apprenticed until 1856 as a bricklayer in Zwickau. At the same time Möckel studied at the Königlichen Baugewerkschule (building trade school) in Chemnitz.

Möckel worked from 1856 to 1858 as a bricklayer and later as a construction manager. From 1858 to 1859, he worked as a draftsman as the senior engineering office of the Upper Ore Mountain State Railways in Chemnitz and worked in the architectural office of Edwin Oppler in Hannover.

From 1861 to 1862, Möckel attended the Polytechnic Hannover. This school taught Gothic architecture, and was known for North German medieval brick building. Möckel's first project was the construction of the psychiatric institution in Göttingen, as a construction technician and assistant to architect Julius Rasch. At the end of 1865, Möckel applied to the Akademie der Bildenden Künste Dresden for approval, then in 1867 he got accepted.

== Work ==
=== Zwickau and Dresden ===
In 1866, Möckel moved back to Zwickau. There he worked until 1875 as a freelance architect. During this time, he designed mainly unpainted neo-gothic houses and villas. In Planitz, one of Möckel's highlights was the Lukaskirche.

In 1875, Möckel moved to Dresden, where he worked until 1885. A freelance architect, he mainly designed church's and palace's. Among other things, he designed the Johanneskirche which is considered to be his main work. He also, restored the St.-Nikolai-Kirche in Löbau. He was appointed on March 3, 1881, by the Academy of Fine Arts Dresden as an honorary member.

After Rasch recommended him for membership, Möckel was admitted to the Architects and Engineers Club Hannover in 1865. In 1873, he was admitted into the Leipzig-based Saxon Engineering and Architects Association.

==== Bad Doberan ====
In the summer of 1877, Möckel was in Doberan to participate in the measures to preserve the Doberan monastery ossuary in Münster. Later the Grand Duke Friedrich Franz III visited the ossuary. They exchanged letters (Mein Lieber Möckel), which started the idea to restore other parts of the Doberan monastery. The letters also led to Möckel building a hunting lodge for the Duke and the construction of the katholischen Kapelle in Heiligendamm. In 1883, the restoration of the Doberan Minster by the Grand Ducal Chamber of Church Affairs in Mecklenburg-Schwerin, to the stilfesten Baumeister. Until 1896, the extensive restoration work, which required his constant presence, so that he can receive permanent residence in Doberan from 1885. To this end, he had 1887 to 1888 build a prestigious villa in neo-Gothic style in a prime location.

On November 11, 1886, Möckel became a technical advisory board for church construction in the Grand Ducal Chamber and thus head of Mecklenburg-Schwerin church building. For his services in the civil service, he was awarded on March 19, 1897 the character of a Privy Building Council and on October 3, 1900, of a Secret Court Building. He remained until his retirement on September 30, 1915 because of his responsibility to the church.

Möckel continued to work as a freelancer. Many buildings, such as residential and commercial buildings, villas, schools, and other public buildings, including the Ständehaus Rostock, and the Gelbensande castle were built according to his designs. He also supported the Schwerin museum director Hofrat Friedrich Schlie, who like Möckel, was a member of the Grand Ducal Commission for the Conservation of Monuments, in the publication of the extensive reference work The Art and History Monuments of the Grand Duchy of Mecklenburg-Schwerin.

At the age of 77 years, the seriously ill Möckel applied for his retirement, a few weeks later he died.

== Work timeline ==
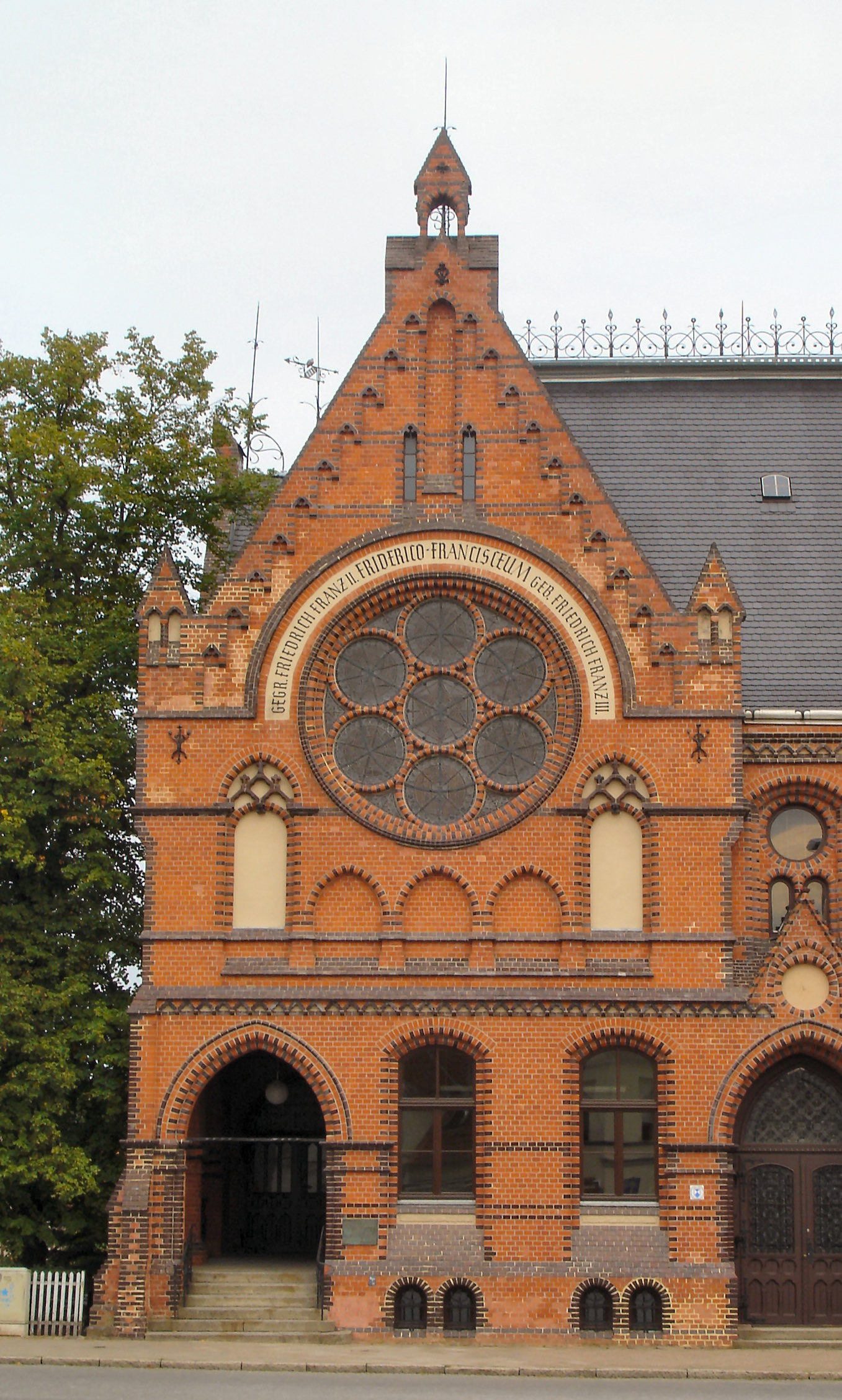
The Gymnasium in Bad Doberan

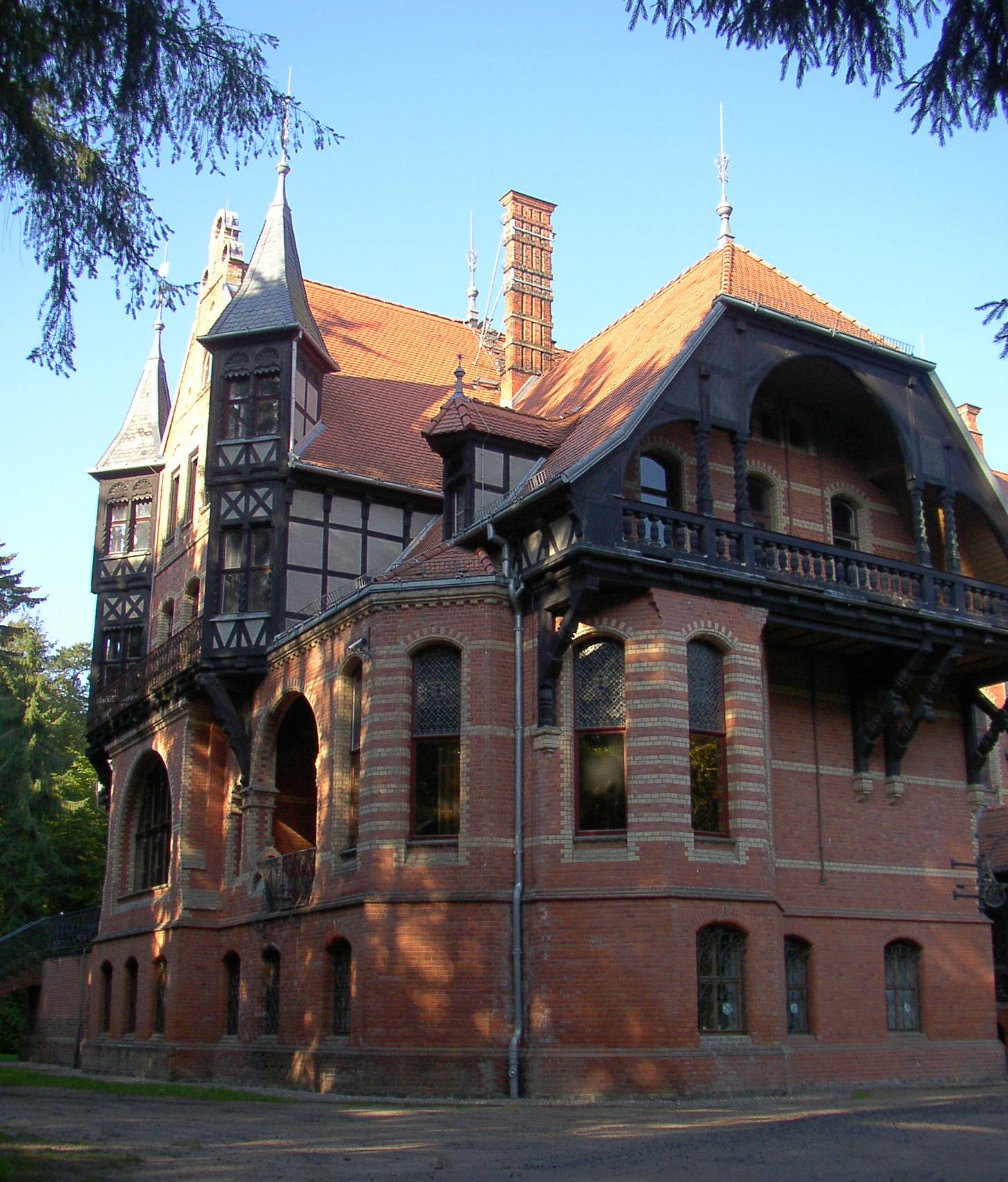
Hunting lodge in Gelbensande

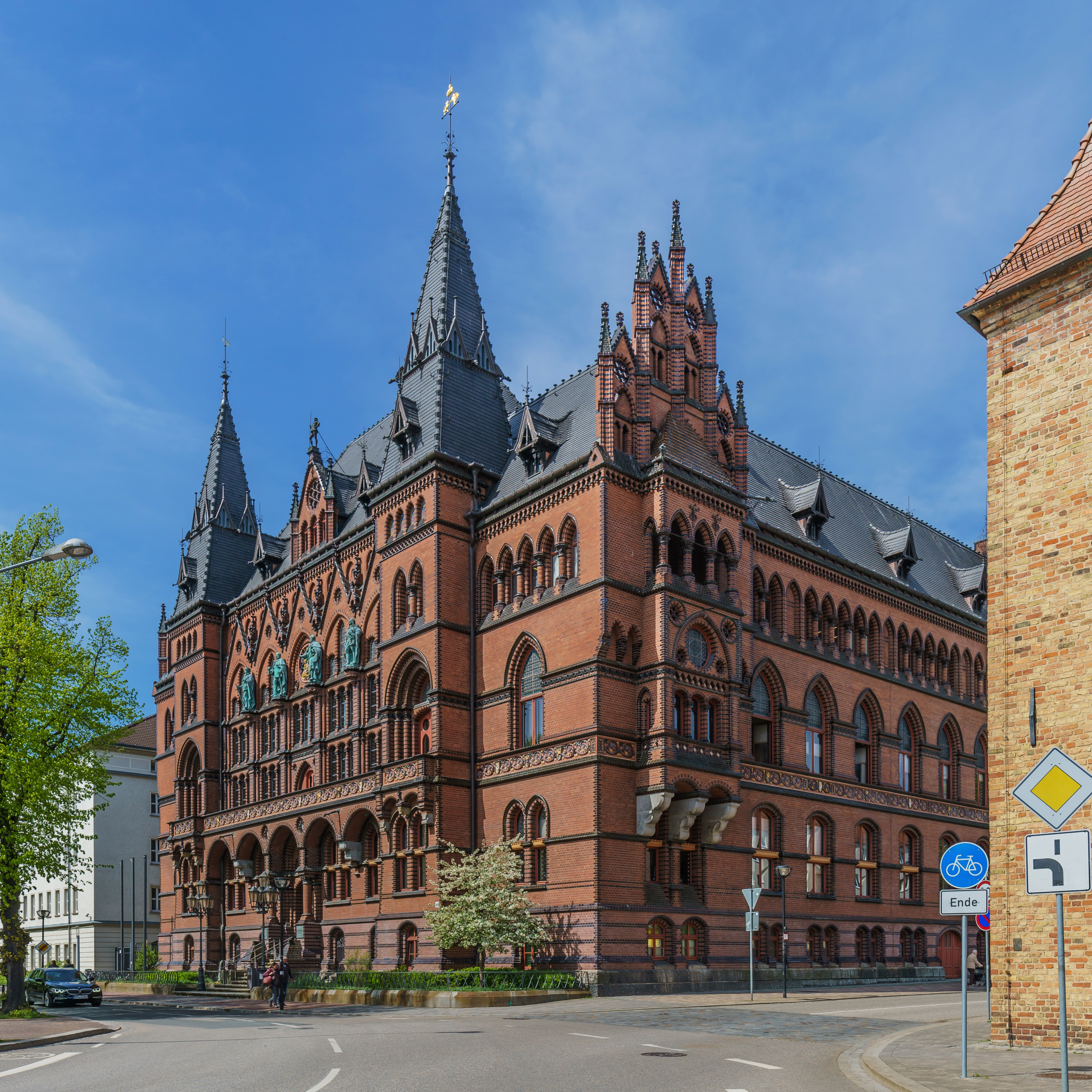
Courthouse in Rostock

Ludwig Möckel participated in 131 construction and planning projects, including 86 church constructions and renovations.

- 1869 Johannisbad in Zwickau
- 1872-1874 internal restoration of the village church in Lohmen near Dobbertin in Mecklenburg.
- 1873 Draft altarpiece of the village church Sietow
- 1872-1875 reconstruction of the Katharinenkirche in Annaberg-Buchholz
- 1873-1876 Lukas Church in Zwickau-Planitz
- 1874-1878 St. John's Church in Dresden (destroyed)
- 1876-1880 Church of the Redeemer in Dresden-Striesen (destroyed)
- 1877-1878 Villa Möckel in Dresden-Südvorstadt 1877 Catholic chapel in Heiligendamm
- 1877-1878 West cultivation of the Katharinenkirche Kesselsdorf
- 1878 Church in Luppa near Radibor
- 1878-1880 Cemetery with cemetery chapel in Striesen
- 1881 Church in Prietitz near Elstra 1881 reconstruction of the church in Briesnitz near Dresden
- 1882-1884 Markuskirche in Leipzig-Reudnitz (blown up in 1978)
- 1883-1884 reconstruction of the St. Jacobi church in Neustadt in Saxony 1882-1884 Extension and equipment of Schönfeld Castle
- 1886-1887 hunting lodge Gelbensande
- 1886-1888 Chapel Althof thoroughly renewed
- 1887-1888 own house (Möckelhaus) in Bad Doberan
- 1887-1888 Sacred Heart Chapel (Heiligendamm)
- 1888 Melkof Castle near Vellahn
- 1888-1891 church in Polchow
- 1887-1889 Friderico-Francisceum (Doberan)
- 1889-1893 Ständehaus Rostock
- 1890-1891 Village church Groß Methling
- 1890-1892 village church Muchow
- 1891-1892 Customs office in Warnemünde
- 1892 Reconciliation Church in Berlin (destroyed in 1985)
- 1892 expansions restaurant Mahn & Ohlerich's cellar Rostock
- 1892-1894 Samariterkirche in Berlin-Friedrichshain
- 1892-1895 neo-Gothic interior design of the village church Volkenshagen near Rostock
- 1893 Neo-Gothic mansion Spoitgendorf near Güstrow
- 1895-1896 Redesign of the interior of the town church in Sternberg
- 1895-1897 Church in Gnevsdorf
- 1896 Church of the Redeemer in Potsdam
- 1896-1898 Redesign of the interior of the town church in Tessin near Rostock
- 1896-1899 Luther Church in Danzig-Langfuhr (preserved, today Parafia Matki Odkupiciela w Gdansku, Catholic)
- 1896-1899 Trinitatiskirche Hainichen
- 1897 Castle in Groß-Lüsewitz near Rostock
- 1897-1898 St. Georgen (Parchim)
- 1899-1901 state blind home in Königs Wusterhausen
- 1904 Protestant Church Heiligendamm
- 1904 Gutshaus Polchow in Old Polchow
- 1904-1906 town church Grabow
- 1906 St. John's Church in Izmir (Turkey)
- 1906-1908 Lukas Church in the Seeheilbad Graal-Müritz
- 1909 Christuskirche in Rostock (destroyed in 1971)
