= 35th G8 summit =

2009 international leader meeting in Italy

Coordinates: 42.350698°N 13.399934°E

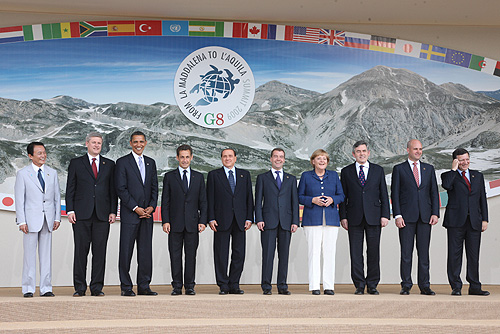
- Host country: Italy
- Dates: 8–10 July 2009
- Cities: L'Aquila
- Venues: Scuola ispettori e sovrintendenti della Guardia di Finanza
- Participants: Canada; France; Germany; Italy; Japan; Russia; United Kingdom; United States; European Union Invited guests: Algeria; Angola; Australia; Brazil; China; Denmark; Egypt; Ethiopia; India; Indonesia; Libya; Malaysia; Netherlands; Nigeria; Senegal; South Korea; Spain; Sweden; Turkey
- Follows: 34th G8 summit
- Precedes: 36th G8 summit

The 35th G8 summit was held in L'Aquila, Abruzzo, Italy, on 8–10 July 2009. It was originally to be held at Sardinian seaside city of La Maddalena, but it was moved to L'Aquila as part of an attempt to redistribute disaster funds after the devastating earthquake that April.

The locations of previous summits to have been hosted by Italy include: Venice (1980); Venice (1987); Naples (1994) and Genoa (2001). The G8 summit has evolved beyond being a gathering of world political leaders. The event has become an occasion for a wide variety of non-governmental organizations, activists and civic groups to congregate and discuss a multitude of issues.

== Overview ==
The Group of Seven (G7) was an unofficial forum which brought together the heads of the richest industrialized countries: France, Germany, Italy, Japan, the United Kingdom, the United States, and Canada starting in 1976. The G8, meeting for the first time in 1997, was formed with the addition of Russia. In addition, the President of the European Commission has been formally invited to summits since 1981 and participates in all but political discussion and talks. The summits were not meant to be linked formally with wider international institutions; and in fact, a mild rebellion against the stiff formality of other international meetings was a part of the genesis of cooperation between France's president Valéry Giscard d'Estaing and West Germany's chancellor Helmut Schmidt as they conceived the initial summit of the Group of Six (G6) in 1975.

The G8 summits during the 21st-century have inspired widespread debates, protests and demonstrations; and the two- or three-day event becomes more than the sum of its parts, elevating the participants, the issues and the venue as focal points for activist pressure.

== Leaders at the summit ==
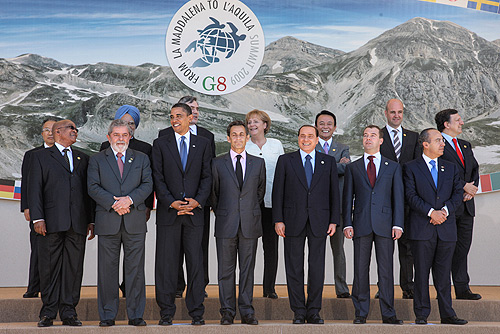
G8+5 family photo.

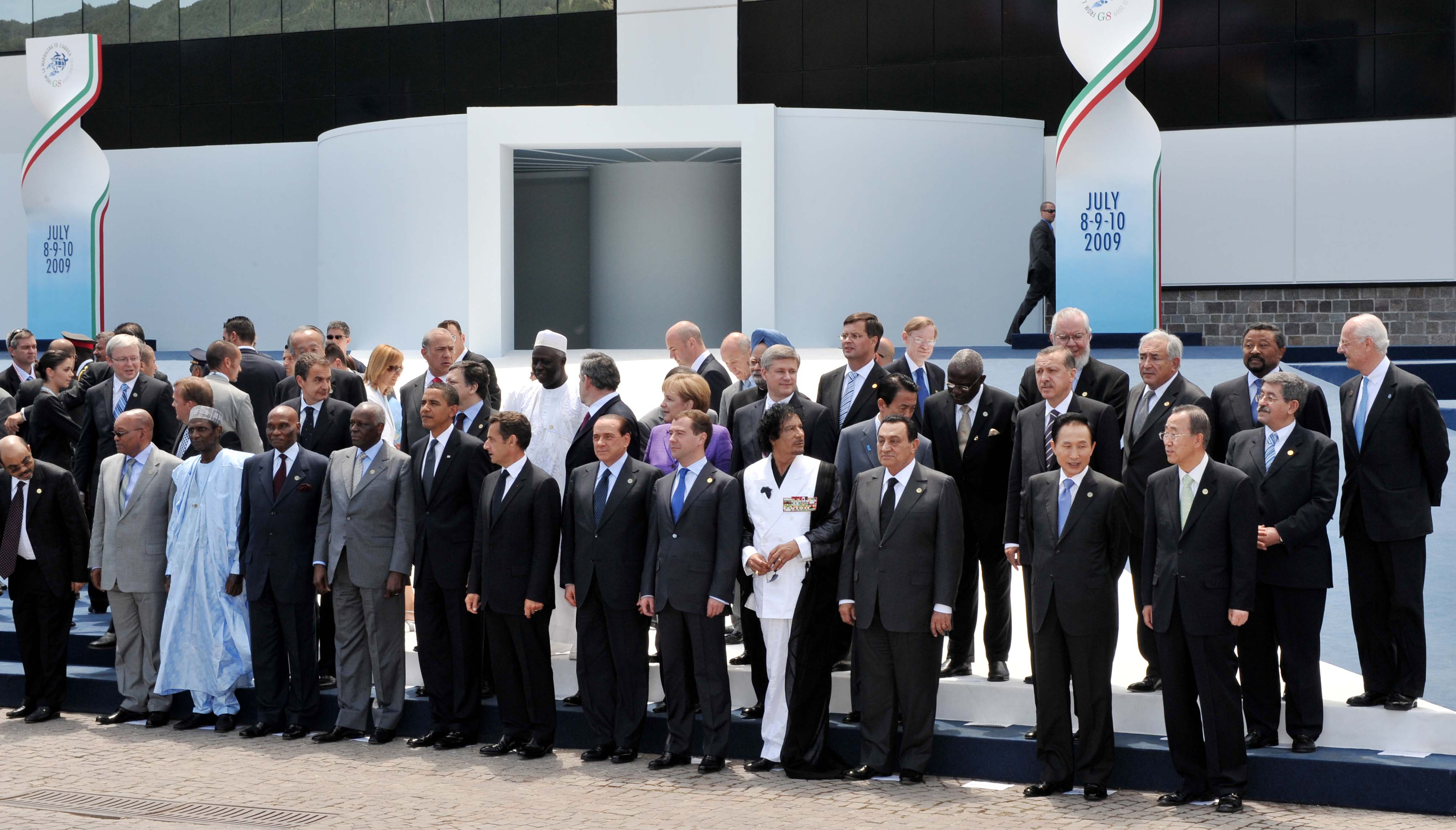
Family photo at the G8 summit on 9 July 2009

The 35th G8 summit was the first summit for US President Barack Obama and was the last summit for British Prime Minister Gordon Brown. It was also the first and only summit for Japanese Prime Minister Taro Aso.

Political changes in the G8 member nations were likely to affect the composition of the 35th G8 summit. France stated it wished China would become a full member by the time of the 37th G8 summit in 2011 was organized as France was the host member. However, this did not happen. Italian Prime Minister Silvio Berlusconi announced at the press conference at the end of the second day of the Hokkaido summit that the current number of participants would be maintained when the G8 leaders meet in 2009. Berlusconi also explained that a proposal to expand the G8 to include members of the Group of Five (G8+G5) emerging economies – China, India, Mexico, Brazil and South Africa – had not found sufficient support.

=== Participants ===
These summit participants were the "core members" of the international forum:

**Core G8 members** Host state and leader are shown in bold text.
Member		Represented by	Title
(Canada)	Canada	Stephen Harper	Prime Minister
(France)	France	Nicolas Sarkozy	President
(Germany)	Germany	Angela Merkel	Chancellor
(Italy)	**Italy**	**Silvio Berlusconi**	**Prime Minister**
(Japan)	Japan	Tarō Asō	Prime Minister
(Russia)	Russia	Dmitry Medvedev	President
(United Kingdom)	United Kingdom	Gordon Brown	Prime Minister
(United States)	United States	Barack Obama	President
(European Union)	European Union	José Manuel Barroso	Commission President
**G8+5 Invitees (Countries)**
Member		Represented by	Title
(Brazil)	Brazil	Luiz Inácio Lula da Silva	President
(China)	China	Dai Bingguo	State Councillor
(India)	India	Manmohan Singh	Prime Minister
(Singapore)	Singapore	Lee Hsien Loong	Prime Minister
(Mexico)	Mexico	Felipe Calderón	President
(South Africa)	South Africa	Jacob Zuma	President
**Limited Guest Invitees (Countries)**
Member		Represented by	Title
(Algeria)	Algeria	Abdelaziz Bouteflika	President
(Angola)	Angola	José Eduardo dos Santos	President
(Australia)	Australia	Kevin Rudd	Prime Minister
(Denmark)	Denmark	Lars Løkke Rasmussen	Prime Minister
(Egypt)	Egypt	Hosni Mubarak	President
(Ethiopia)	Ethiopia	Meles Zenawi	Prime Minister
(Malaysia)	Malaysia	Najib Tun Razak	Prime Minister
(Indonesia)	Indonesia	Susilo Bambang Yudhoyono	President
(Libya)	Libya	Muammar Gaddafi	Guide of the Revolution
(Netherlands)	Netherlands	Jan Peter Balkenende	Prime Minister
(Nigeria)	Nigeria	Umaru Musa Yar'Adua	President
(Senegal)	Senegal	Abdoulaye Wade	President
(South Korea)	South Korea	Lee Myung-bak	President
(Spain)	Spain	José Luis Rodríguez Zapatero	Prime Minister
(Sweden)	Sweden	Fredrik Reinfeldt	Prime Minister and European Council President
(Turkey)	Turkey	Recep Tayyip Erdoğan	Prime Minister
**Guest Invitees (International Institutions)**
Member		Represented by	Title
(African Union)	African Union	Muammar Gaddafi	Chairperson
(African Union)	African Union	Jean Ping	Commission President
(Commonwealth of Independent States)	Commonwealth of Independent States	Sergey Lebedev	Executive Secretary
	Food and Agriculture Organization	Jacques Diouf	Director-General
(International Atomic Energy Agency)	International Atomic Energy Agency	Mohamed ElBaradei	Director General
	International Energy Agency	Nobuo Tanaka	Executive Director
	International Monetary Fund	Dominique Strauss-Kahn	managing director
(United Nations)	United Nations	Ban Ki-moon	Secretary-General
(UNESCO)	UNESCO	Kōichirō Matsuura	Director-General
	World Bank	Robert Zoellick	President
(World Health Organization)	World Health Organization	Margaret Chan	Director-General
	World Trade Organization	Pascal Lamy	Director-General

==== Invited leaders ====
A number of national leaders are traditionally invited to attend the summit and to participate in some, but not all, G8 summit activities.

The G8 plus the five largest emerging economies are known as G8+5, including: Brazilian President Luiz Inácio Lula da Silva, Chinese President Hu Jintao, Indian Prime Minister Manmohan Singh, Mexican President Felipe Calderón, and South African President Jacob Zuma. Hu curtailed his participation following the eruption of ethnic rioting in Ürümqi. In his place, State Councilor Dai Bingguo led the Chinese delegation at the summit.

Previous G8 summits have invited other world leaders to participate; and the Italian duty Presidency invited a number of countries to participate in this summit.

Italy's Berlusconi announced that his country was prepared to host leaders of the G20 on the third day of talks. The proposed purpose was to work towards developing new rules to stop the phenomenon of excessive securitization in the financial system and the use of derivatives that led to the 2008 financial crisis. Brown supported this proposal.

The Italian presidency of the G8 varies the summit's working methods and the numbers of participants depending on the subject under consideration. This "variable geometry structure" diverges from the traditional G8 format. The involvement of different actors at different stages goes further than the idea of a simple "G8+?". After an initial meeting of the "historic core" leaders of what is understood as the traditional G8), the agenda was broadened and the number of participants was expanded accordingly. The leaders of G8 countries and G5 countries were joined by a delegation from Egypt and a representative group of African countries.

Some suggested that the G8's annual meetings be broadened to include the heads of states or governments of the other countries represented in the governing bodies of the Bretton Woods institutions along with the heads of the main multilateral organizations. This would convert the G8 summits into an informal "global governance council."

== Priorities ==
Traditionally, the host country of the G8 summit sets the agenda for negotiations, which take place primarily amongst multi-national civil servants known informally as "sherpas". Effective organization at the sherpa level is understood to be essential for the success of a summit meeting.

== Issues ==
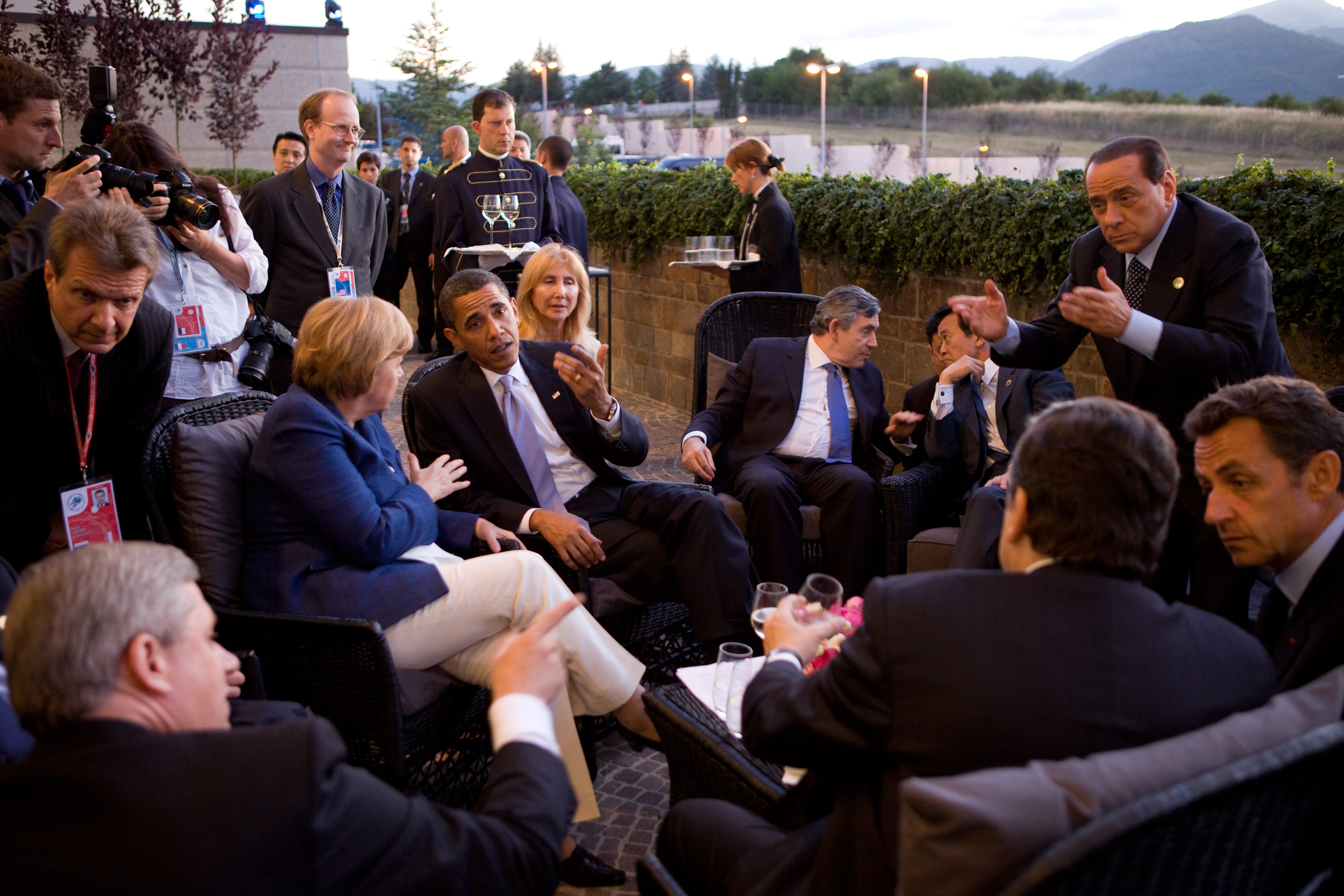
G8 leaders conferring together

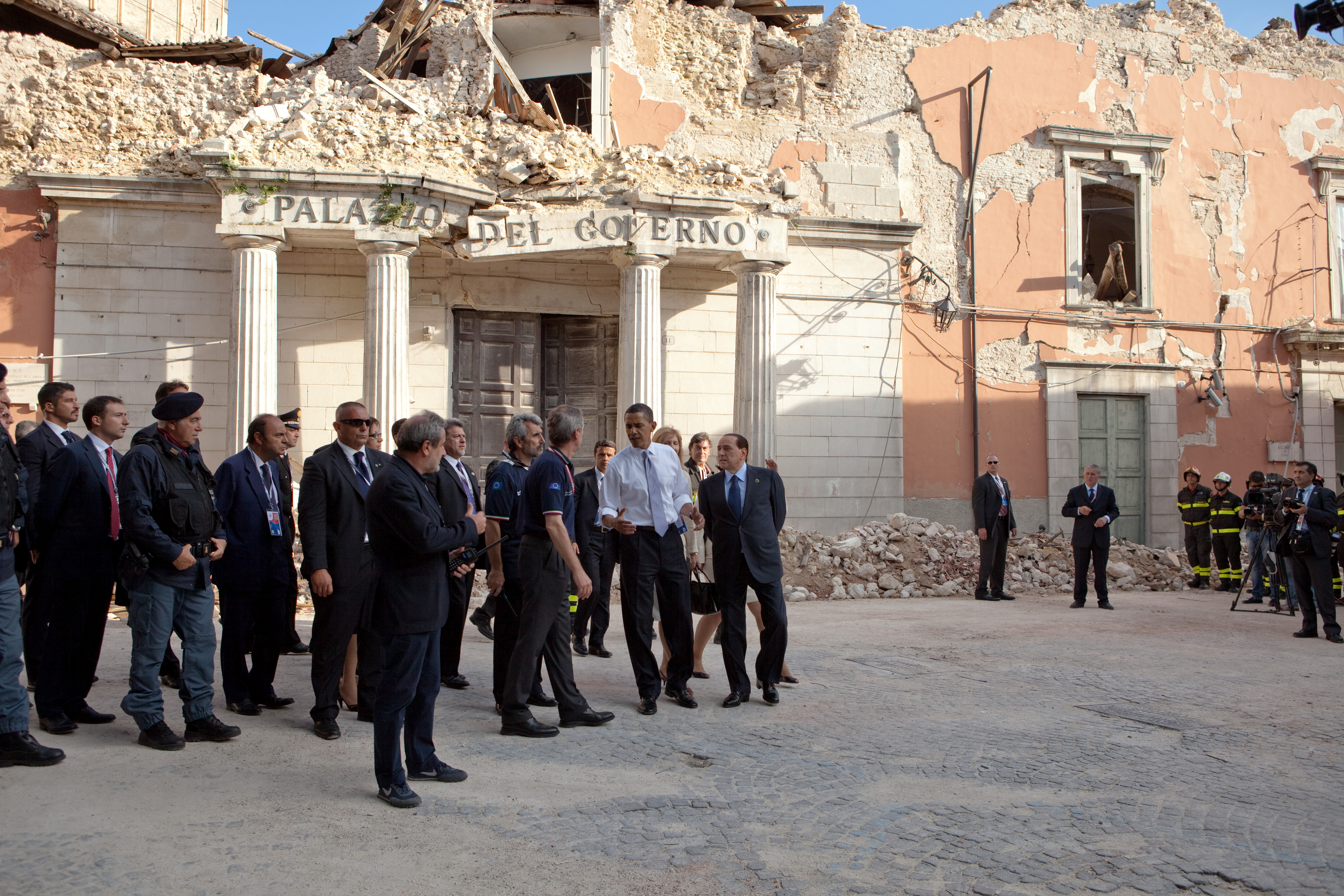
US President Barack Obama visited L'Aquila to see the earthquake damage.

The summit was intended as a venue for resolving differences among its members. As a practical matter, the summit was also conceived as an opportunity for its members to give each other mutual encouragement in the face of difficult economic decisions. From Italy's perspective, the important thing is for the evolving G8 to avoid being too closely linked to serial emergency situations when there is no room for discussing broader issues.

The main themes of the Rambouillet summit in 1975 have persisted at the top of the world's agenda—avoiding protectionism, gaining energy independence, and boosting growth. In March 2009, during a trip to São Paulo, Brazil, Peter Mandelson, then British Secretary of State for Business, Enterprise and Regulatory Reform, expressed the opinion that "however long it might persist as a grouping, as a steering committee for the global economy, the era of the G8 is over". Russia had just invaded Georgia but was still invited to the Summit.

=== Schedule and Agenda ===
Before the summit, Italian Prime Minister Berlusconi explained that the schedule of meetings would be very much like that of the Hokkaido summit,

"My opinion is that it is best to keep together countries which share the same principles and I suggested that in 2009 the first day of the summit should see just the G8 meet. On the second day the table can be expanded in the morning to include the G5, with the G8+5 also discussing Africa, while the G8 would then meet alone in the afternoon to draw their conclusions. This program was unanimously accepted and will be used at the G8 summit in Italy."

The agenda for the 35th G8 summit included some issues which remain unresolved from previous summits. The process of finalizing the agenda moved forward when Berlusconi's began contacting his G8 counterparts shortly after Italy took over the rotating presidency on 1 January 2009. At this point, the Italian premier's office announced that Italy, as G8 host country, was planning to focus its initiatives on the economy, energy issues, sustainable development, and climate change. Other issues on the agenda might encompass disarmament, the fight against terrorism and peace efforts in world hot spots. Global health issues and food were also proposed as suitable topics for discussion at the summit. Global health was first introduced as an agenda item nine years ago at the 26th G8 summit in 2000.

On the G8 agenda:
- Climate change
- Energy; Nuclear energy
- Dialogue with emerging countries
- Achievement of millennium development goals
- Negotiations on climate change
- Development of Africa – 4 issues (alimentation, global health, water, education) or education, water, food and agriculture, peace support
- Intellectual property
- Heiligendamm Process
- Outreach and expansion

=== Infrastructure Consortium of Africa ===
The G8 leaders discussed a range of issues relating to African development. Africa, which has been on the G8 agenda since 2000, has continued to lag behind on progress towards meeting Millennium Development Goals (MDGs). In February 2009, Margaret Chan, head of the WHO, emphasized the importance of meeting the modest goals which were discussed and adopted in previous G8 summit discussions.

The Infrastructure Consortium for Africa (ICA) was established at the 31st G8 summit at Gleneagles, Scotland in the United Kingdom in 2005. Since that time, the ICA's annual meeting is traditionally hosted by the country holding the Presidency of the G8. The 2008 meeting was held in Tokyo in March 2008, and the 2009 meeting took place in mid-March in Rome.

=== Environment and Climate change ===
The G8 leaders discussed a range of issues relating to climate in the context of a framework established at the 2007 United Nations Climate Change Conference held in Bali, Indonesia.

In the final documents the heads of State and Government, decided also to endorse one of the main achievements of the previous G8 environment ministers meeting, held in Siracusa (Sicily) in April 2009, the Carta di Siracusa on Biodiversity, establishing the global major priorities in that field and the road map for the future.

=== Nuclear Security pre-summit ===
In a series of related statements, G8 leaders endorsed the strategy and a "Global Summit on Nuclear Security" in March 2010, that Obama proposed on the first day of the summit, committing to "reducing and eventually eliminating existing nuclear arsenals; strengthening the Nuclear Non-Proliferation Treaty and stopping the spread of nuclear weapons to additional nations; and preventing terrorists and political extremists from obtaining nuclear weapons or materials."

== Citizens' responses and authorities' counter-responses ==
=== Protesters and demonstrations ===
Protest groups and other activists were expected to make a showing at the summit. Forward planning for this and future G8 summits began in advance of the 2008 Hokkaido summit. Activist organizations anticipated that early planning can result in greater networking effectiveness for G8 summits. The 2009 summit attracted significant focus for development campaigners in G8 countries and elsewhere in Europe including the regional GCAP Europe. Collective campaigning ahead of the European Parliament elections was also anticipated to generate momentum on global issues ahead of July 2009.

In 2008, a number of commemorative events were organized to mark the seventh anniversary of demonstrations at the Genoa G8 summit; and the occasion included a call for people to participate in preparations for protests at the 2009 G8 summit.

Anti-poverty charities were keen to make sure pressure is kept up to ensure that the G8 sticks to the aid promises they made in 2005, thanks to the massive Make Poverty History Campaign. However some who were involved in Make Poverty History, such as the Jubilee Debt Campaign, lost patience with the G8 and began to argue that only through its abolition will global solutions to poverty and climate change be found.

== Security ==
In light of violent events at the Genoa summit, security was one of the key indices for measuring the success of the L'Aquila summit. In a December 2008 press conference, Berlusconi addressed this issue explicitly: "Given the traumatic experience of Genoa ... for us the problem of security is a real one. The previous government picked La Maddalena thinking, I believe, that this location would be ideal to avoid a repeat of what happened in Genoa."

Italian authorities anticipated 25,000 people attending the summit, including 4,500 delegates, 4,500 journalists, and a large number of security forces. The government put into place 15 000 police officers from Carabinieri, Polizia, Guardia di Finanza along with the army, the air force, and the navy.

== Budget ==
Although the Italian government insisted the summit's moving would help restore normality and provide much-needed funding to devastated L'Aquila, it remains to be seen how it can justify the costs involved with preparing the original site for its years-in-the-making facelift.

Part of the cost of creating the original facilities for the 2009 summit were merged in the costs of transforming the former US Navy submarine base at Punta Rossa into a tourist and vacation destination. This harbor has been an Italian naval base since 1887; but the area was bombed extensively in World War II; and some of work involves restoration as well as renewal. The Arsenale marittimo (maritime arsenal) has been converted to a new use as a conference center; and the military hospital has been reconfigured for use as a hotel. From the beginning of the conversion's design stage, planning focused on potential uses which could be anticipated after the end of the G8 summit.

At the end of the 2009 summit, La Maddalena's facilities and amenities were to be made available for tourist accommodations, and the conference spaces will be available for booking. The harbor's reconstructed quays, moorings and amenities will become a new Mediterranean port of call just north of the exclusive Costa Smeralda of eastern Sardinia.

The infrastructure investment which resurfaces and extends the length of the nearby airport's runways will also upgrade the facility for increased tourism traffic after the summit leaders have left the island.

== Business opportunity ==
For some, the G8 summit becomes a profit-generating event; as for example, the G8 Summit magazines which have been published under the auspices of the host nations for distribution to all attendees since 1998.

== Gallery of participating leaders ==
=== Core G8 participants ===
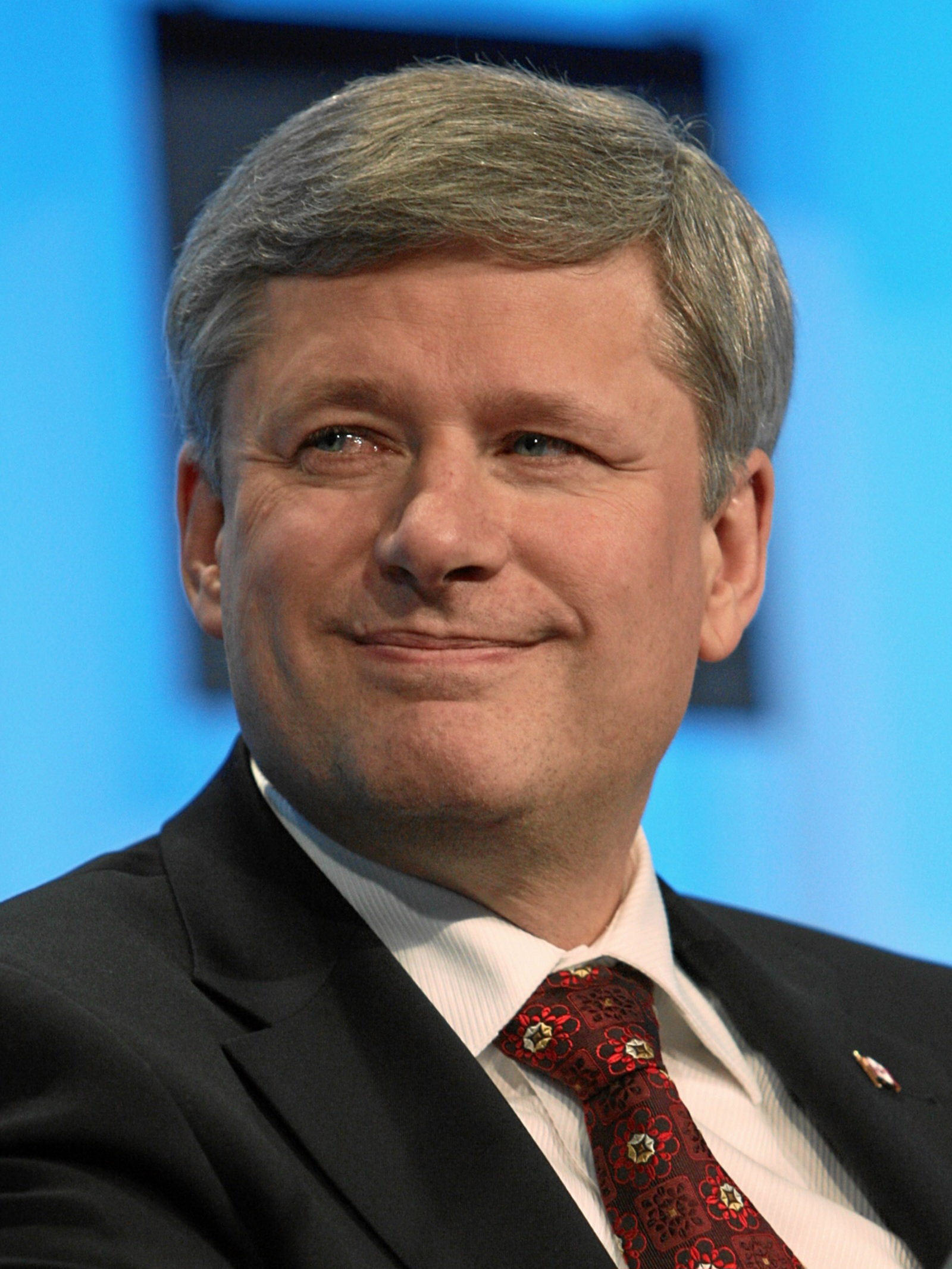
Canada
Stephen Harper,
Prime Minister

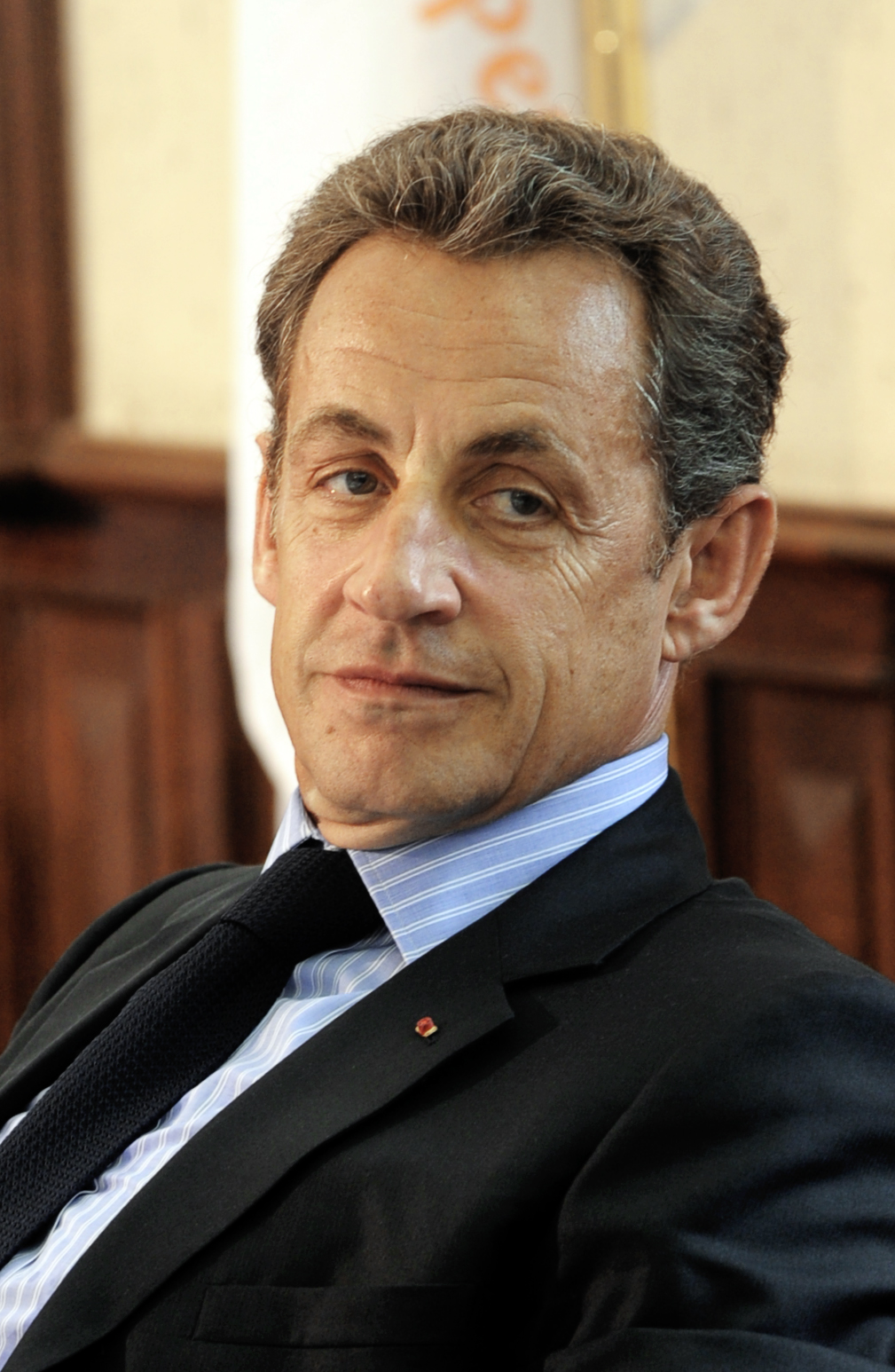
France
Nicolas Sarkozy,
President

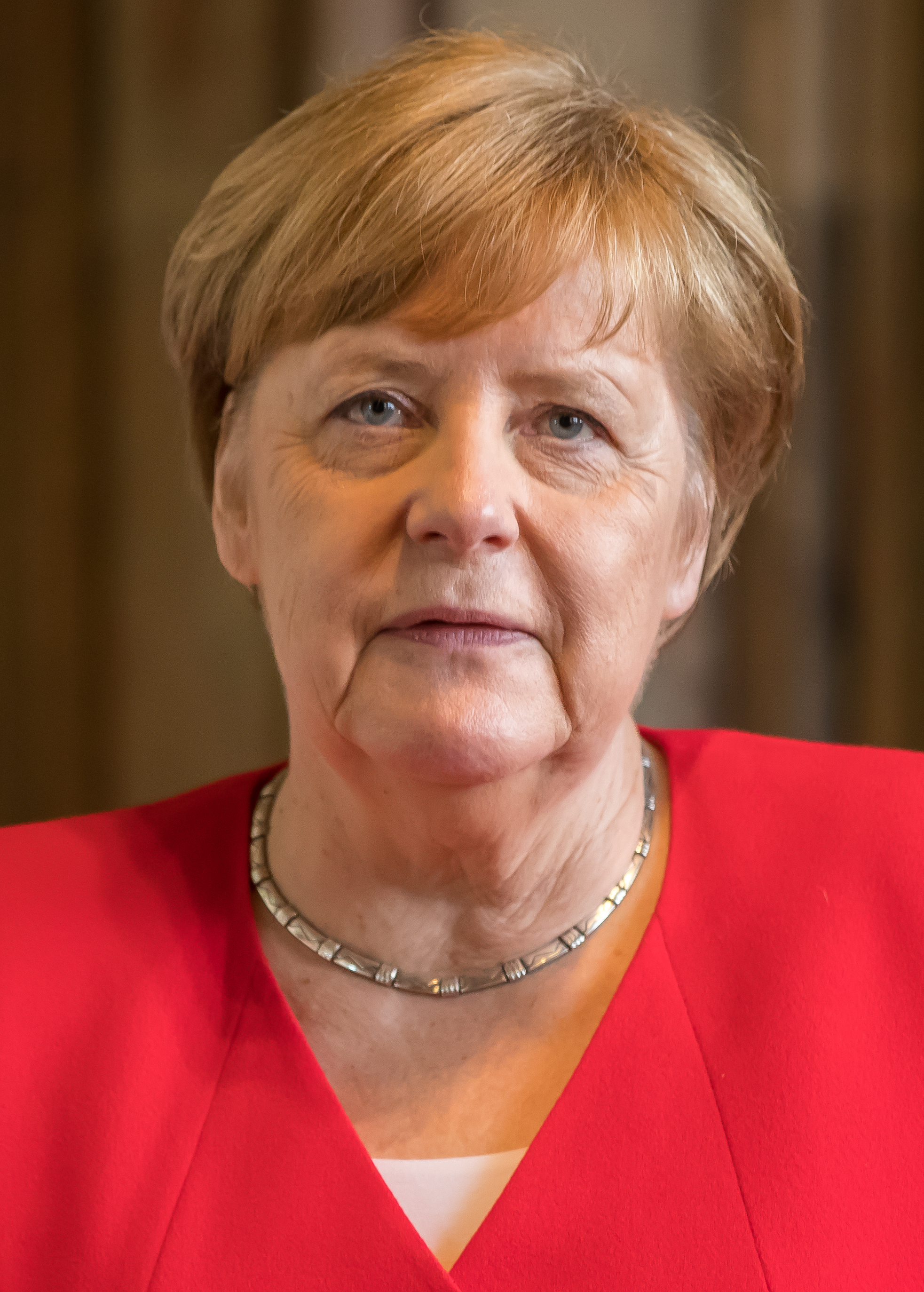
Germany
Angela Merkel,
Chancellor

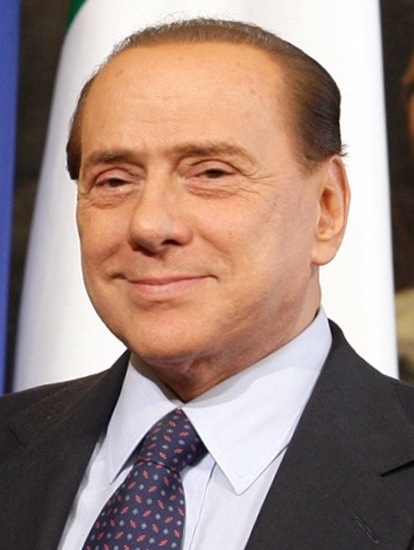
Italy
Silvio Berlusconi,
Prime Minister (Host)

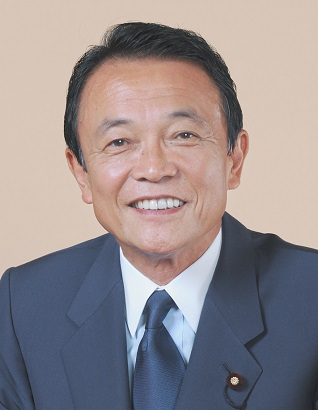
Japan
Taro Aso,
Prime Minister

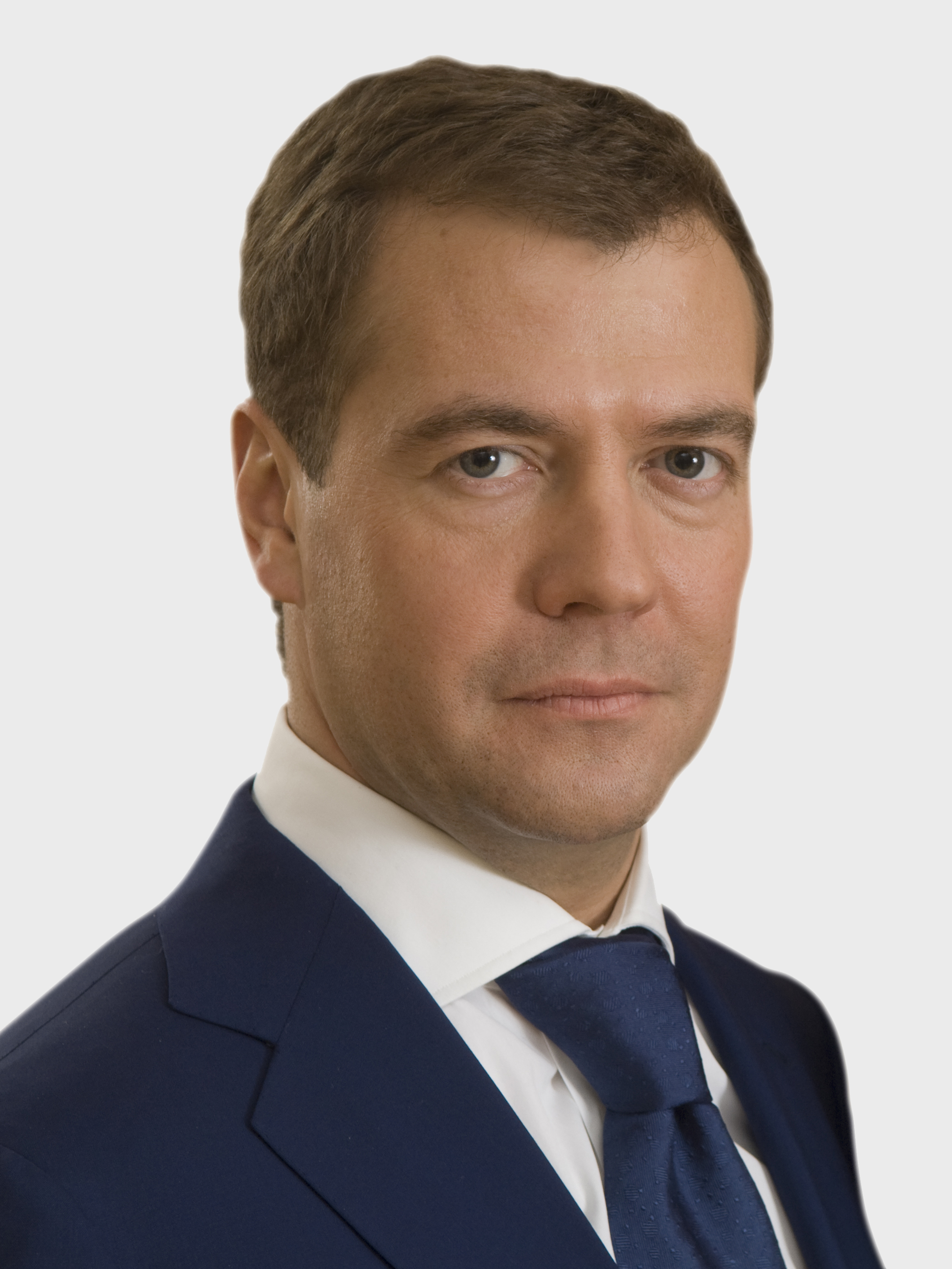
Russia
Dmitry Medvedev,
President

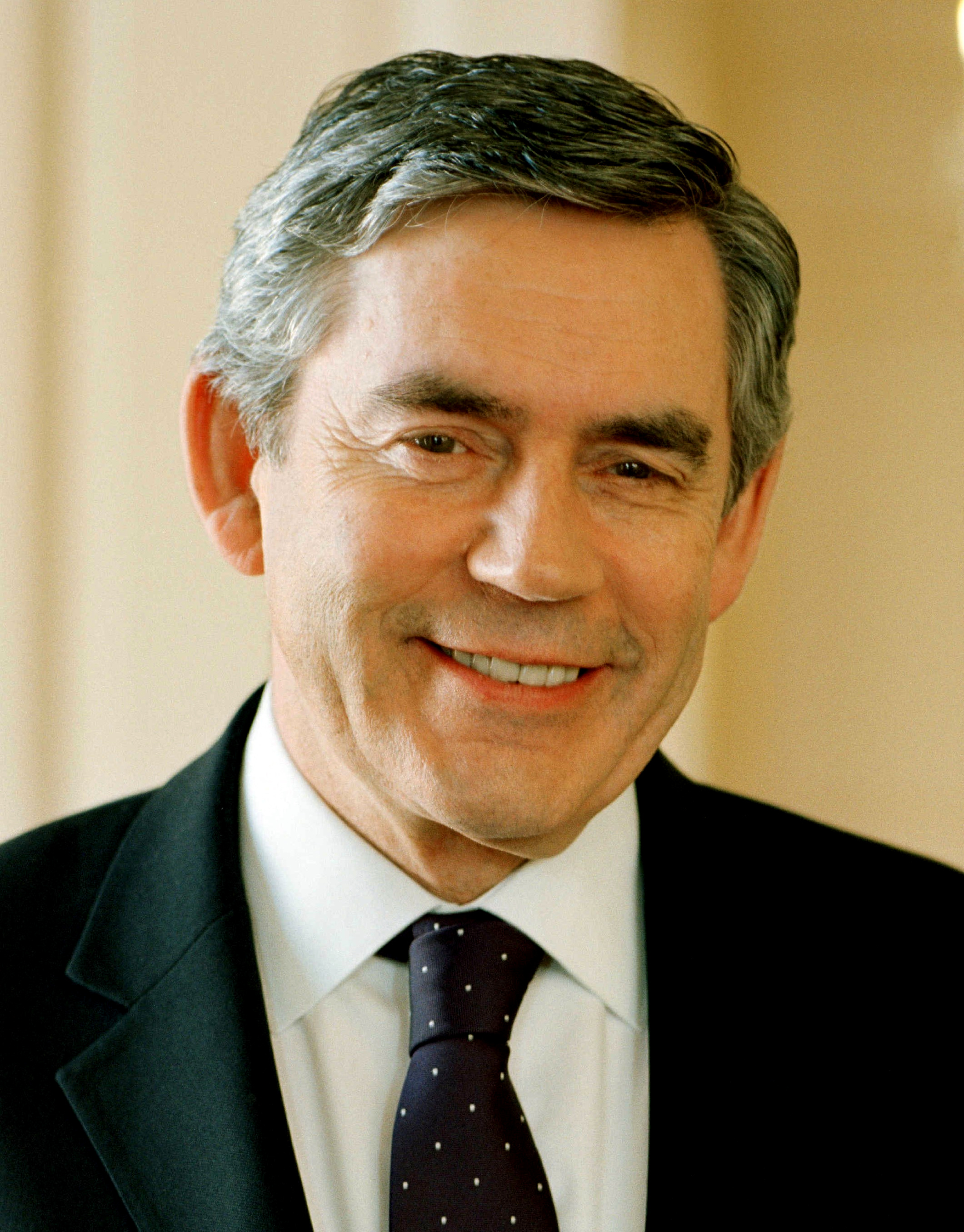
United Kingdom
Gordon Brown,
Prime Minister

United States
Barack Obama,
President
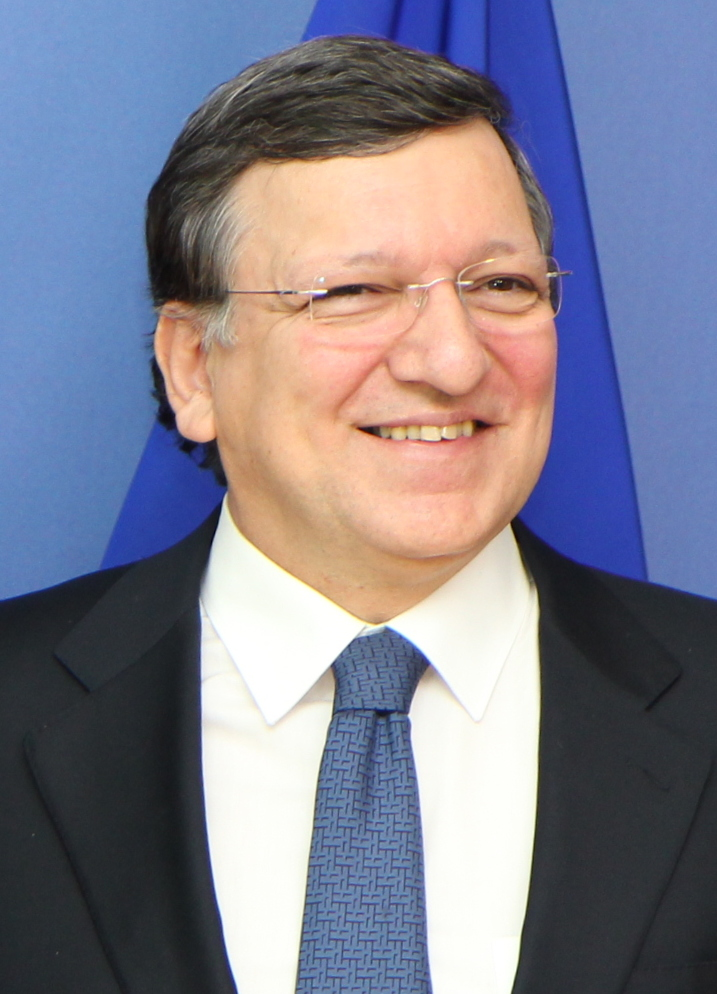
European Union
José Manuel Barroso, Commission President

== See also ==
- International Panel on Climate Change
- United Nations Framework Convention on Climate Change
