= G8 Alternatives =

Coalition of activist groups

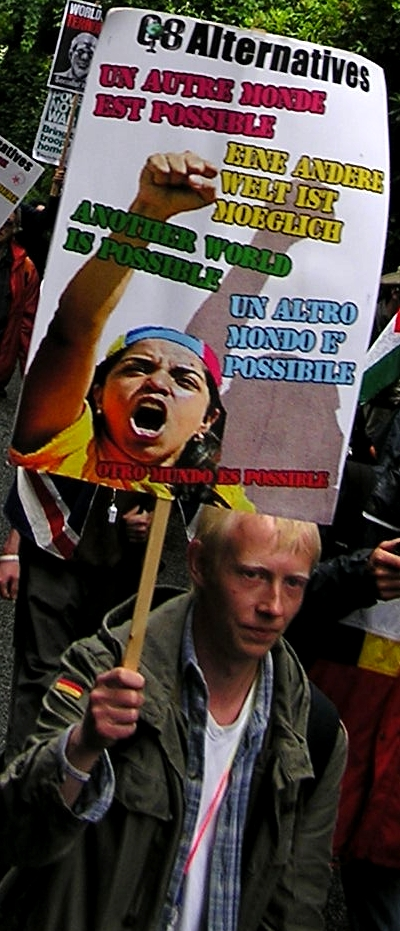
Protester holding a G8 Alternatives placard

G8 Alternatives was a coalition of activist groups set up to co-ordinate actions around the 31st G8 summit held at Gleneagles Hotel in Perthshire, Scotland.

Supporters of the coalition included Campaign for Nuclear Disarmament, Iraq Occupation Focus, Muslim Association of Britain, Scottish Socialist Party, Stop the War Coalition and various trade union branches. Individual supporters included author and academic Noam Chomsky, journalist John Pilger and comedian Mark Thomas.

== Activities ==
=== Counter Summit ===
G8 Alternatives organised a counter-summit on July 3 which was addressed by a wide range of speakers. Among those in attendance were writer George Monbiot, South African anti-privatisation activist Trevor Ngwane and Philippine anti-globalisation activist Walden Bello. Nonetheless, the coalition's demonstration in Auchterarder on the day the G8 summit began was perhaps their most significant action.

=== Protest by SSP MSPs ===
The coalition had considerable difficulty getting permission for the march and just days before the G8 it looked likely that permission would be denied, despite a prior agreement by the Scottish Executive that the right to protest at Gleneagles would be upheld. In response to this, Scottish Socialist Party MSPs made a silent protest in the chamber at Holyrood. They were debarred from the parliament for a month for refusing to leave the chamber when instructed to do so by the Speaker. Permission was eventually granted only days before the protest was to take place.

=== March on Gleneagles ===
On the day itself, police did call the march off for a time, and there was a level of confusion among the public about whether or not the march would be going ahead, however they eventually relented when the organisers said they would go ahead anyway and when a number of protesters started to head toward Edinburgh as an alternative protest site. Despite this a number of coaches were turned back or temporarily detained.

The march attracted considerable media attention when a number of participants broke away from the main demonstration across a field where they proceeded to bring down a section of the fence surrounding the hotel where the summit was being held. The police responded by bringing in additional riot police using Chinook helicopters and were soon able to clear the field.

== See also ==
- Dissent!
- Make Poverty History
