= Clean Energy for Development Investment Framework =

World Bank initiative

The Clean Energy for Development Investment Framework is a World Bank initiative to help developing countries reduce carbon emissions while increasing their ability to generate electricity.

The initiative was a response to the G8 request for an Investment Framework on Climate Change, Clean Energy and Sustainable Development, in the context of the Gleneagles Communique which was issued in July 2005. The World Bank presented the outlines of key elements associated with such a work program in April 2006 in a paper titled "Clean Energy and Development: Towards an Investment Framework”. The World Bank reported progress on this work at the Annual Meetings in Singapore in September 2006 in a document titled “An Investment Framework for Clean Energy and Development: A Progress Report.” An Action Plan was completed and presented to the Board in March 2007.

The Clean Energy Investment Framework is built on three pillars:

1. Scaling-up energy access to Sub-Saharan Africa;
2. Promoting the transition to a low carbon economy, while respecting the circumstances of individual developing countries and without hindering their economic growth; and,
3. Adaptation to climate variability and change.
