= Carta di Siracusa on Biodiversity =

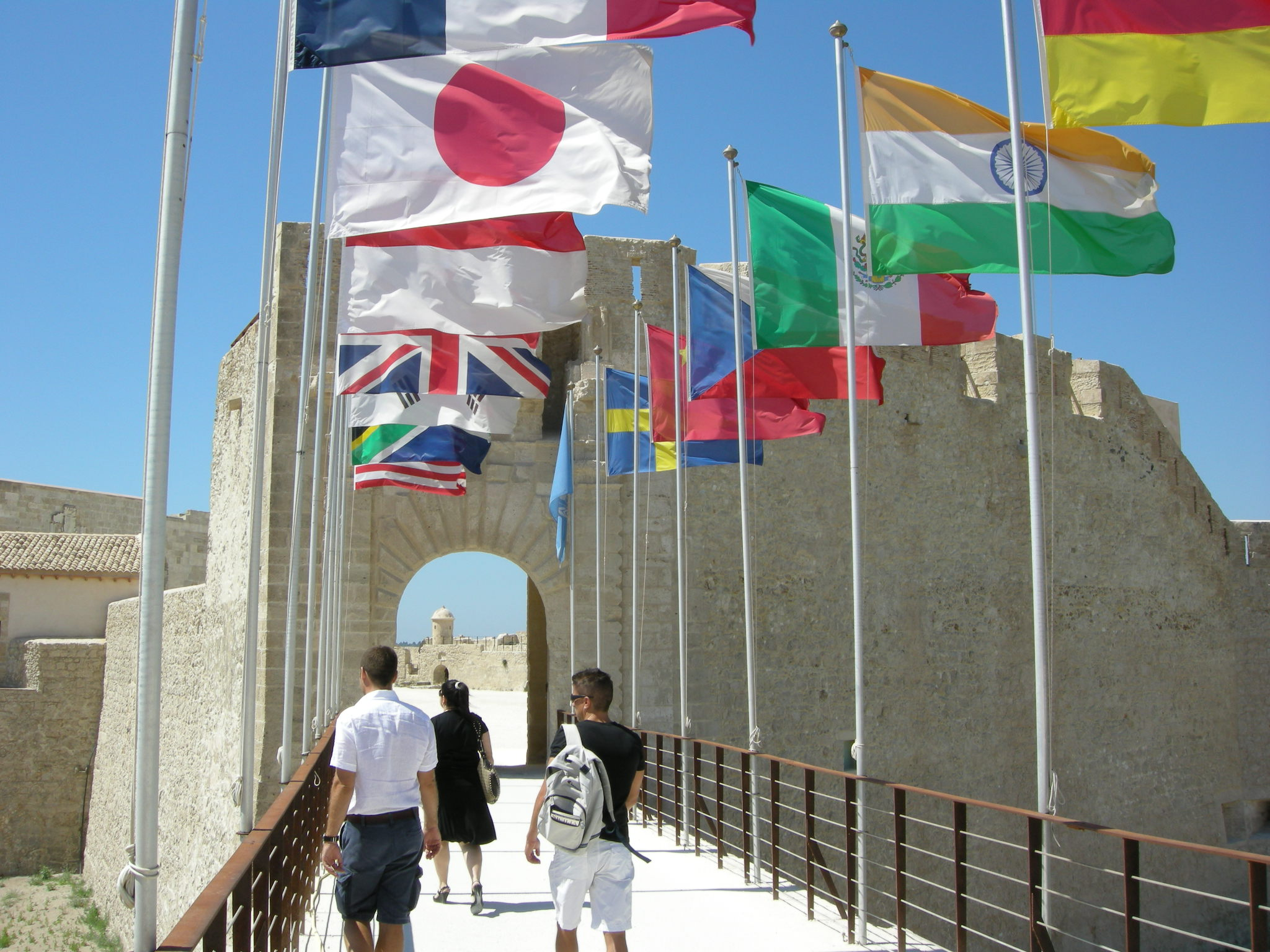
The Castello Maniace, place of the signature of the Carta di Siracusa on Biodiversity.

The "Carta di Siracusa on Biodiversity" is a political document agreed at the G8 Environmental Ministers Meeting, held in Syracuse (Sicily) from 22 to 24 April 2009.

== Title and organization of the document ==
The document is organized in a preamble and four sections. The common decision to leave part of the official title of the document in Italian was taken both for pay an hommage the host country, but also for not having in the title a word like "charter" considered from some of the Ministers present too legally binding, before the official endorsement from the G8 summit meeting.

== Sections ==
1. Biodiversity and climate, highlighting the specific correlation, suggests actions that exploit the key role of biodiversity and ecosystem services in adaption to climate change and to cope with the negative effects;
2. Biodiversity, economics and business, which emphasizes how investing in conservation and sustainable use of natural resources can contribute to sustainable global economic recovery and contribute to poverty reduction;
3. Biodiversity management and Ecosystem services, which indicates a range of possible strategies to counter the risks of loss of ecosystem services and the consequent negative effects on quality of life;
4. Science, research and policy, which identifies a number of needs for upgrading knowledge and to optimize the process of utilization of such knowledge in decision making.

The final section of the document presents a special message for the identification of a global framework for achieving the 2010 Biodiversity Target. This message stresses the importance of biodiversity for human life, highlights the need to implement joint measures for its preservation, underpins the scientific dialogue and the need of a reform of global environmental governance.

== Follow-up of the document ==
The 35th G8 summit held in L’Aquila endorsed the “Carta di Siracusa” on Biodiversity, on the first day of meetings, July 8, 2009 turn it into a political statement of the heads of state and Governments, and considering it as an essential tool for establishing environmental priorities in global biodiversity.

The Italian government is also planning to officially present the document at the United Nations General Assembly during the special session forecast in 2010 in New York City United Nations headquarters, for the celebration of the International Year of Biodiversity.
