= Dissent! =

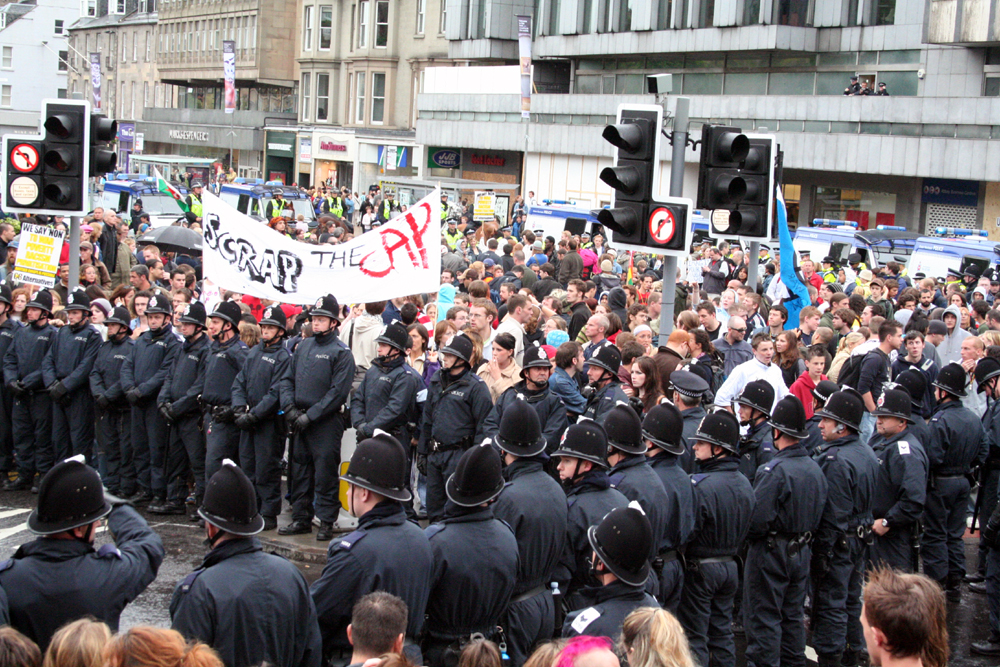
Anti-globalization protests at the start of the G8 Summit organized by Dissent!

Dissent! was the name adopted by an international network of local groups, which came together to organise opposition to the G8 summit held at Gleneagles Hotel, Perthshire, Scotland, in July 2005. Most groups shared an anti-capitalist orientation and anti-authoritarian organizing methods and the network declares itself to be open to anyone prepared to work within the Hallmarks of Peoples' Global Action, an international co-ordination of radical social movements and grassroots campaigns. Dissent acted as a networking tool and created infrastructure which was used by groups with methods of protest ranging from anti-border city tours and street parties to road blockades, graffiti and confrontations with the police.

The network was formed in the autumn of 2003 by a group of people who have previously been involved in radical ecological direct action, Peoples' Global Action, the anti-war movement and the global anti-capitalist movement which has emerged around meetings of those that rule over us.

In the run-up to the summit itself, groups associated with Dissent! organised actions targeting a number of the preparatory meetings which brought together ministers from the G8 countries. Among these were the Environment and Development Ministerial in Derbyshire (March 17–18) and the Justice and Interior Ministerial in Sheffield (June 15–18).

The network set-up an "eco-camp" known as HoriZone in the town of Stirling to host protesters. This was organised along non-hierarchical lines conforming with the principles of direct democracy and broken down into largely autonomous "barrios". The camp was also run in such a way as to minimise its environmental impact; recycling, conserving water and utilising biodiesel in its vehicles.

The Dissent! Network in Germany was one of the networks mobilising against the 33rd G8 summit in Heiligendamm, Germany, since 2005. Since that time other Dissent! Networks were started in Sweden, Netherlands, Spain, Belgium and France.

== See also ==
- 31st G8 summit
- G8 Alternatives
- Make Poverty History
