= 31st G8 summit =

2005 international leader meeting in Scotland

- Official logo
- Host country: United Kingdom (Scotland)
- Date: 6–8 July 2005
- Cities: Auchterarder
- Venues: Gleneagles Hotel
- Follows: 30th G8 summit
- Precedes: 32nd G8 summit

The 31st G8 summit was held on 6–8 July 2005 at the Gleneagles Hotel in Auchterarder, Scotland and hosted by Prime Minister Tony Blair. The locations of previous G8 summits to have been hosted by the UK include: London (1977, 1984, 1991); and Birmingham (1998). It is the first G8 summit to be held in Scotland. A sixth UK summit was held in Lough Erne in 2013; and a seventh UK summit was held in Carbis Bay in 2021.

== Overview ==
The Group of Seven (G7) was an unofficial forum which brought together the heads of the richest industrialized countries: Canada, France, Germany, Italy, Japan, the United Kingdom, and the United States starting in 1976. The G8, meeting for the first time in 1997, was formed with the addition of Russia. In addition, the President of the European Commission has been formally included in summits since 1981. The summits were not meant to be linked formally with wider international institutions; and in fact, a mild rebellion against the stiff formality of other international meetings was a part of the genesis of cooperation between France's president Valéry Giscard d'Estaing and West Germany's chancellor Helmut Schmidt as they conceived the initial summit of the Group of Six (G6) in 1975.

The G8 summits during the 21st-century have inspired widespread debates, protests and demonstrations; and the two- or three-day event becomes more than the sum of its parts, elevating the participants, the issues and the venue as focal points for activist pressure.

== Leaders at the summit ==
The G8 is an unofficial annual forum for the leaders of Canada, the European Commission, France, Germany, Italy, Japan, Russia, the United Kingdom, and the United States.

The 31st G8 summit was the last summit for Canadian Prime Minister Paul Martin and German Chancellor Gerhard Schröder.

=== Participants ===
These summit participants are the current "core members" of the international forum:

**Core G8 members** Host state and leader are shown in bold text.
| Member | | Represented by | Title |
| (Canada) | Canada | Paul Martin | Prime Minister |
| (France) | France | Jacques Chirac | President |
| (Germany) | Germany | Gerhard Schröder | Chancellor |
| (Italy) | Italy | Silvio Berlusconi | Prime Minister |
| (Japan) | Japan | Junichiro Koizumi | Prime Minister |
| (Russia) | Russia | Vladimir Putin | President |
| (United Kingdom) | **United Kingdom** | **Tony Blair** | **Prime Minister** |
| (United States) | United States | George W. Bush | President |
| (European Union) | European Union | José Manuel Barroso | Commission President |
| (European Union) | European Union | **Tony Blair** | Council President |
**Guest Invitees (Countries)**
| Member | | Represented by | Title |
| (Brazil) | Brazil | Luiz Inácio Lula da Silva | President |
| (China) | China | Hu Jintao | General Secretary; President |
| (Ethiopia) | Ethiopia | Meles Zenawi | Prime Minister |
| (India) | India | Manmohan Singh | Prime Minister |
| (Mexico) | Mexico | Vicente Fox | President |
| (South Africa) | South Africa | Thabo Mbeki | President |
**Guest Invitees (International Institutions)**
| Member | | Represented by | Title |
| (United Nations) | United Nations | Kofi Annan | Secretary-General |
| | World Bank | Paul Wolfowitz | President |

== Priorities ==
Traditionally, the host country of the G8 summit sets the agenda for negotiations, which take place primarily amongst multi-national civil servants in the weeks before the summit itself, leading to a joint declaration which all countries can agree to sign.

As host, the UK stated its intent to focus this G8 meeting on the issues of global climate change and the lack of economic development in Africa. The British government set the priorities of supporting Africa's economic development (by agreeing to write off debts of the poorest countries, and to significantly increase aid) and of moving forward initiatives to research and combat global warming.

Blair had planned to move beyond the Kyoto Protocol by looking at how to include key developing countries (India, China, Mexico, Brazil, and South Africa) not included in it – principally by agreeing technology transfer of clean energy technologies in exchange for commitments on reduction of greenhouse gases. Other announced items on the agenda were counterterrorism, non-proliferation, and reform in the Middle East. The summit was overshadowed, however, by bomb attacks in London on the second day of the conference.

=== Aid to Africa and debt cancellation ===
The traditional meeting of G8 finance ministers before the summit took place in London on 10 and 11 June 2005, hosted by Chancellor Gordon Brown. On 11 June, agreement was reached to write off the entire US$40 billion debt owed by 18 Highly Indebted Poor Countries to the World Bank, the International Monetary Fund, and the African Development Fund. The annual saving in debt payments amounts to just over US$1 billion. War on Want estimates that US$45.7 billion would be required for 62 countries to meet the Millennium Development Goals. The ministers stated that twenty more countries, with an additional US$15 billion in debt, would be eligible for debt relief if they met targets on fighting corruption and continue to fulfill structural adjustment conditionalities that eliminate impediments to private investment. The agreement, which required weeks of intense negotiations led by Brown, must be approved by the lending institutions to take effect.

While negotiations have essentially taken place between the G8 member states, some of which are reluctant to endorse debt cancellation and aid increases, African governments, advocacy organizations and their allies have criticised the Blair-Brown plan as inadequate and argued that the continuation of structural adjustment policies outweighs the benefits of debt cancellation, while also pointing out that only a small proportion of the Third World debt will be affected by the proposal. In mid-July, objections by Belgium raised the possibility of the debt relief bill not being approved by the International Monetary Fund, a development that was harshly criticized by many activists.

Agreement was not reached on Brown's proposed International Finance Facility, partly because the United States said that its budget procedures meant it was unable to make the necessary long-term funding commitments. The event attracted much media attention.

=== Global warming ===
Development of a joint declaration on efforts to tackle global warming has been much less successful, principally because of the long-standing US opposition to emission targets as a solution to global warming. The other seven G8 nations – France, Russia, Germany, Japan, Italy, Canada, and the United Kingdom – have ratified the Kyoto Protocol and have committed to reducing their carbon dioxide emissions by 2010. Hopes had been raised that the unprecedented joint declaration by the G8 countries' academies of sciences on the need for urgent action on global warming would help moderate the US negotiating position.

On 6 July, US President George W. Bush recognised "that the surface of the Earth is warmer and that an increase in greenhouse gases is contributing to the problem". However, he said the Kyoto treaty was not the answer. Environment campaigners called the result of the summit "a very disappointing finale". "The G8 have delivered nothing new here and the text conveys no sense of the scale or urgency of the challenge. The action plan, without any targets or timetables, will deliver very little to reduce emissions, or to roll out renewables to the scale required", said a spokesperson for Friends of the Earth.

The US also pulled out of financial pledges to fund a network of regional climate centers throughout Africa which were designed to monitor the unfolding impact of global warming. Other schemes opposed by the US include the Clean Development Mechanism (CDM) set up to help developing states develop economically while controlling greenhouse gas emissions. New US move to spoil climate accord

To address claims that flying so many people around the world to talk about global warming actually contributes substantially to it, the entire G8 Presidency was designed to be carbon neutral, with calculated resulting carbon emissions being offset by purchasing Certified Emissions Reductions (CERs) from a Clean Development Mechanism project. The Kuyasa low-income housing energy upgrade project located in Cape Town, South Africa, was chosen. The first CDM project to be registered in Africa, it involves the installation of solar water heaters, ceiling insulation and low-energy light-bulbs in hundreds of low-income homes in Khayelitsha township.Defra, UK – Environmental Protection – Climate Change – Cost of carbon – Carbon offsetting

== Issues ==
The summit was intended as a venue for resolving differences among its members. As a practical matter, the summit was also conceived as an opportunity for its members to give each other mutual encouragement in the face of difficult economic decisions. The United Kingdom aimed to confront the fundamental problem of conflicting domestic pressures among the G8 nations.

== Citizens' responses and authorities' counter-responses ==
=== Activism ===
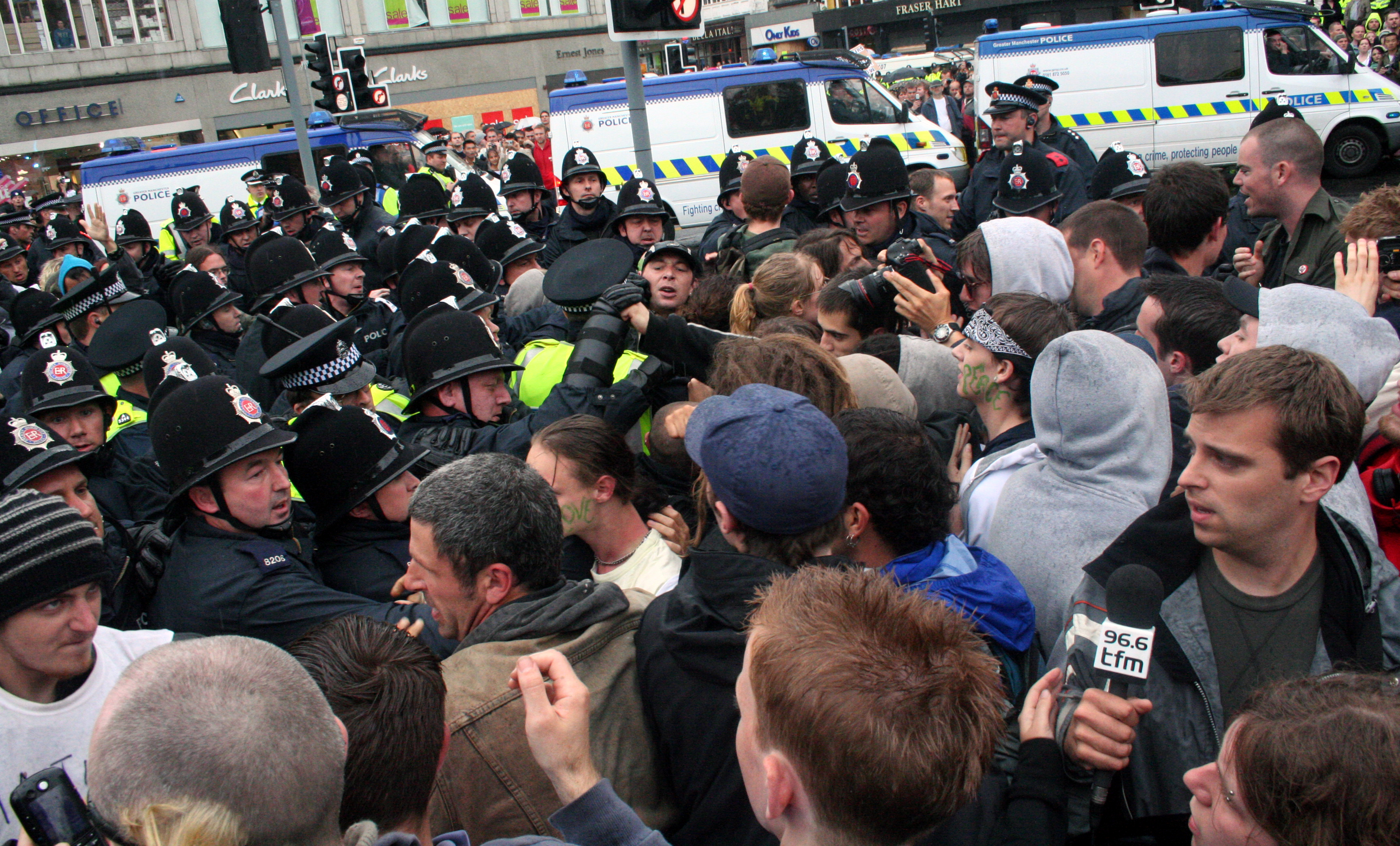
Protesters clashing with the Greater Manchester Police officers who were deployed to Edinburgh at the start of the summit

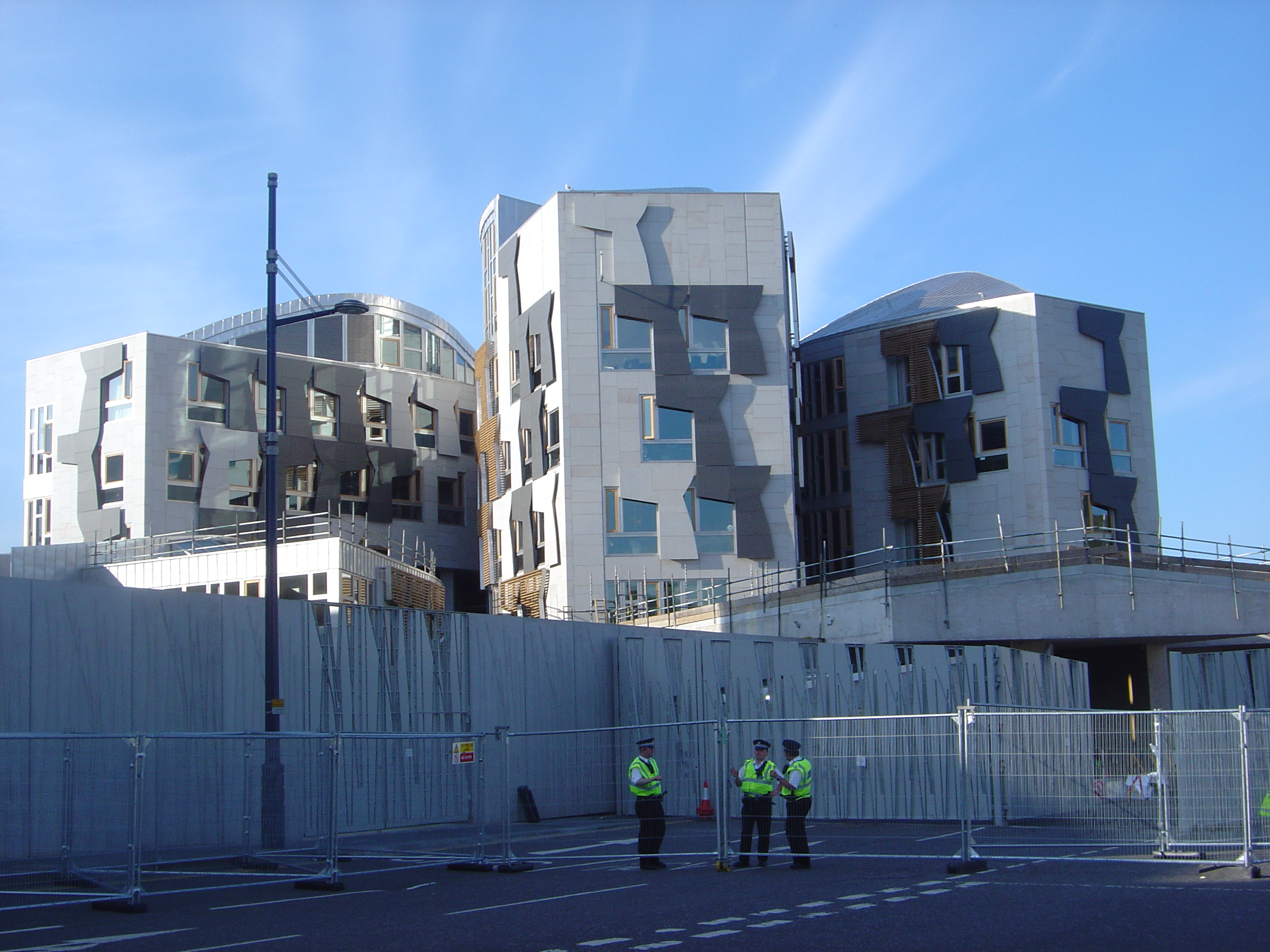
The area surrounding Holyrood Palace and the Scottish Parliament was cordoned off by double fences.

As with all recent G8 summits, the meeting was the focus of many advocacy campaigns, including the Make Poverty History campaign in the United Kingdom, and the anti-globalization (a term not usually used by its supporters) movement. More than 220,000 people marched in support of Make Poverty History in Edinburgh on 2 July, the largest demonstration in Scottish history.

In addition to the Make Poverty History coalition's efforts, singer/activist Bob Geldof organised concerts in each of the G8 member states on 2 July, as well as a concert in Edinburgh on 6 July. Unlike Live Aid 20 years prior, whose primary aim was to raise money, Live 8 aimed to increase awareness among the citizens of the G8 countries, and thus force their leaders into increasing their focus on world poverty – though in fact Live 8 raised 400 times more than Live Aid simply in terms of the debt deal which the Gleneagles summit delivered; if the deal on aid is honoured it will produce an amount the equivalent of five Live Aid concerts every week. The London concert featured acts ranging from Sting and The Who to Annie Lennox, and most notably the reformation of Pink Floyd.

Thousands also mobilized through the G8 Alternatives and Dissent! networks to protest the G8 and discuss alternatives to the economic and political models they represent. These mobilizations have taken a more critical line towards both economic globalization (which they reject entirely) and the G8 itself, which they generally regard as illegitimate and undemocratic.

The National Library of Scotland holds a collection of leaflets, posters and pamphlets collected during the G8 Summit.

Protest took a variety of forms:

- Construction of a non-hierarchically organized, self-governing, eco-village near Stirling
- 2 July – Make Poverty History march with 175,000 to 250,000 people
- 3 July – Make Borders History tour of Glasgow, illustrating the presence of borders and immigration control measures inside of a metropolis
- 3 July – Counter Summit organised by G8 Alternatives alongside a smaller event called G8 Corporate Dreams Global Nightmares
- 4 July – Carnival for Full Enjoyment, roving anticapitalist street parties, 1,500 to 3,000 people
- 4 July – Mass nonviolent blockade of Faslane, a Royal Navy submarine base, 2,000 to 10,000 people
- 5 July – Demonstrations against Shell, Dungavel immigrant and refugee detention center, and the limits of Gordon Brown's debt cancellation proposal
- 6 July – Blockades of roads and buses transporting ministers and support staff to Gleneagles.
- 6 July – March and rally to G8 meeting site, approximately 5000 people
- 6 July – Breach of the fence around Gleneagles Hotel by 200 people
- 6 July – Spontaneous march in Edinburgh by a few hundred protesters hoping to take coaches to the Gleneagles rally, after police falsely informed them that the march was cancelled
- 8 July – Street party in Glasgow in protest against climate change and the construction of the M74 motorway
- 8 July – various decentralised small actions against climate change as part of a global day of action
- 8 July – Small prisoner solidarity rally outside Saughton Prison, Edinburgh by around 50 demonstrators

=== Security and police actions ===
On 19 June details of the security for the summit were leaked to the British newspaper The Independent on Sunday, because of concerns by an intelligence source that ministers were being "complacent".

The security operation, involving more than 10,000 police, many of whom were armed, possibly a number of US Marines, a Special Air Service (SAS) team and snipers, as well as the unprecedented intelligence gathering beforehand by the security service and American intelligence agencies is estimated to have cost around GB£100 million.

Police officers from all over Great Britain were called in to reinforce the local forces to maintain order in Edinburgh and other cities; even small protests were cordoned off by large numbers of police officers.

The protest legal support team estimates that at least 700 people were arrested and 350 charged. Targeted actions of London's forward intelligence teams (FITs) resulted in several of the arrests. Most people were released with strict bail conditions, having to leave the districts of Edinburgh, Glasgow, Perth, and/or Stirling or even Scotland altogether. Several people were rearrested for breaching their bail conditions. Section 60 of the Criminal Justice and Public Order Act 1994, which allows searches for weapons in designated areas, was continuously used to stop and search people.

== Accomplishments ==
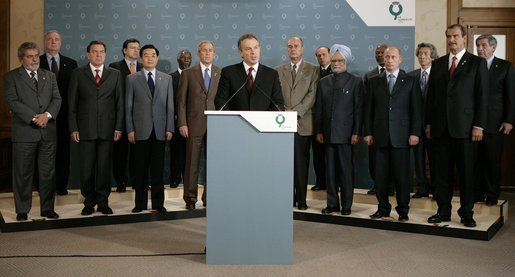
UK Prime Minister Tony Blair speaks on the London bombings with the summit attendees behind him. Left to right (front row): Lula da Silva, Gerhard Schröder, Hu Jintao, George W. Bush, Jacques Chirac, Manmohan Singh, Vladimir Putin, Vicente Fox; (back row): Paul Martin, José Barroso, Thabo Mbeki, Silvio Berlusconi, Kofi Annan, Junichiro Koizumi, and Paul Wolfowitz

The G8 summit is an international event which is observed and reported by news media, but the G8's continuing relevance after more than 30 years is somewhat unclear. More than one analyst suggests that a G8 summit is not the place to flesh out the details of any difficult or controversial policy issue in the context of a three-day event. Rather, the meeting offers an opportunity to bring a range of complex and sometimes inter-related issues. The G8 summit brings leaders together "not so they can dream up quick fixes, but to talk and think about them together."

While many activists expressed disappointment that the agreements reached at the summit fell far short of their expectations, others noted that the 2005 summit was perhaps the most productive in the 30-year history of the G8. Some agreements were:

- US$50 billion pledged (some of it previously announced) in aid to developing countries by 2010, of which US$25 billion will go to Africa, on top of the ministerial-level agreement to forgive debt to Highly Indebted Poor Countries
- Universal access to anti-HIV drugs in Africa by 2010
- Commitment to train 20,000 peacekeeping troops for Africa in exchange for African commitments to good governance and democracy
- G8 members from the European Union commit to a collective foreign aid target of 0.56% of GDP by 2010, and 0.7% by 2015
- Stated commitment to reduce subsidies and tariffs that inhibit trade
- US$3 billion to the Palestinian Authority to build infrastructure

No agreement was reached to address global warming, largely due to US opposition. The US did agree to a joint communique stating that global warming exists and that human intervention may at least partially be at fault. While the US had previously made such statements, this was the first time it had agreed to a multilateral announcement on the issue.

Breaking with historical practice, the British government had allowed non-governmental organizations to play a key role in deliberations, perhaps prompted by the public pressure of the Make Poverty History movement and Live 8. The summit continued the trend of including the developing world in talks. The leaders of seven African nations attended, as well as the five leading developing countries: China, India, Brazil, Mexico, and, South Africa.

=== Infrastructure Consortium for Africa ===
The Infrastructure Consortium for Africa (ICA) was established at the Gleneagles summit in 2005. In subsequent years, the ICA's annual meeting is traditionally hosted by the country holding the Presidency of the G8.

== Subsequent analysis ==
Closer investigation of many of the promises made at Gleneagles reveals that some of the aid funds were rehashed versions of aid already pledged and the aid was often used to privatise public services to businesses based in the donor country. However even three years on many G8 countries were backsliding on their aid quantity commitments.

The debt deal was not ‘full’ cancellation of debts at all but only cancellation of the debts for 40 potential countries (classed as the poorest countries), and even then only after completing the ‘Highly Indebted Poor Country’ (HIPC) initiative – that means changing their economic policies at the behest of the International Monetary Fund and World Bank – meaning more of the same economic conditionalities which were highlighted as problems by the Make Poverty History campaign. For example, Tanzania was forced to privatise water (to a British company – Bi-water) which led to a worse service and higher prices. In practice, only 19 developing countries signed up to the HIPC initiative. Even then, only the debt to the public international financial institutions was cancelled (so [Indonesia's arms debts][www.jubileescotland.org.uk], for example, were not covered). Even then the debts will only apply to a cut off date of 2003. This came despite the fact that the Commission for Africa report noted that in many cases the debt has in practice been paid back many times over, and that the debt was often accrued by illegitimate governments propped up by rich countries. The partial debt cancellation has done some good – Zambia for example is now able to provide universal free healthcare and Tanzania has increased its education spending. However debt campaigners argue that there is still far to go to reach the needed 100 per cent.

Although the 2005 G8 communique promised that developing countries should be able to decide their own economic policies, there has been little evidence of this in practice. For example, the EU went on to attempt to push so called 'Economic Partnership Agreements' on developing countries, which Trade Justice campaigners argue will not be good for developing countries, and are being forced upon them against their will.

== London bombings ==
Because of the bombings, Blair decided to leave the G8 meeting temporarily to be present in London. He held a brief press conference, saying that the incidents were obviously terrorist attacks directed at the gathering of the G8. He also said that the meeting would continue in his absence, with Foreign Secretary Jack Straw filling in for him. Blair returned to Gleneagles by the evening of the 7th by Chinook helicopter, with heavy military escort.

Reports suggest that the bombings may have been planned that day because the terrorists knew that a large number of London police officers would be deployed in Scotland, weakening the city. Thousands of officers were deployed to Scotland from the Metropolitan Police, British Transport Police, and City of London Police, as well as many from other forces. In the event, London was actually better prepared, because a large number of Officers had been deployed to Central London as reserves in case of protest. The Metropolitan Police SOR, Special Operations Room, had been stood up and so there was a full Command Team in place with units immediately able to be deployed.

== Bush bicycle accident ==
While attending the summit, on 6 July 2005, George W. Bush collided with a British police officer, suffering minor lacerations on his hands and arms; the officer was taken to a local hospital.

It was initially reported that the officer suffered only minor injuries and was taken to the hospital only as a precaution. However, the officer ended up needing crutches and missing three months of duty. On 26 February 2006, The Scotsman published a previously unreleased police report which contradicted the administration's story:

As the President passed the junction at speed he raised his left arm from the handlebars to wave to the police officers present while shouting 'thanks, you guys, for coming'. As he did this he lost control of the cycle, falling to the ground, causing both himself and his bicycle to strike [the officer] on the lower legs.

Bush, who has experienced other bicycle- and Segway-related accidents, commented, "When you ride hard on a mountain bike, sometimes you fall, otherwise you're not riding hard."

== Budget ==
The Gleneagles G8 summit cost the host nation £12.7 million. Of this, £4.1m was spent on the conference facilities, catering and accommodation; £3.9m was spent on facilities and catering for the media; and £1.5m for transport related to the summit. Policing and security of the summit cost an extra £72m, of which £52m was provided by the Scottish Government.

== Business opportunity ==
For some, the G8 summit became a profit-generating event; as for example, the official G8 Summit magazines which have been published under the auspices of the host nations for distribution to all attendees since 1998.

== Gallery of participating leaders ==
=== Core G8 participants ===
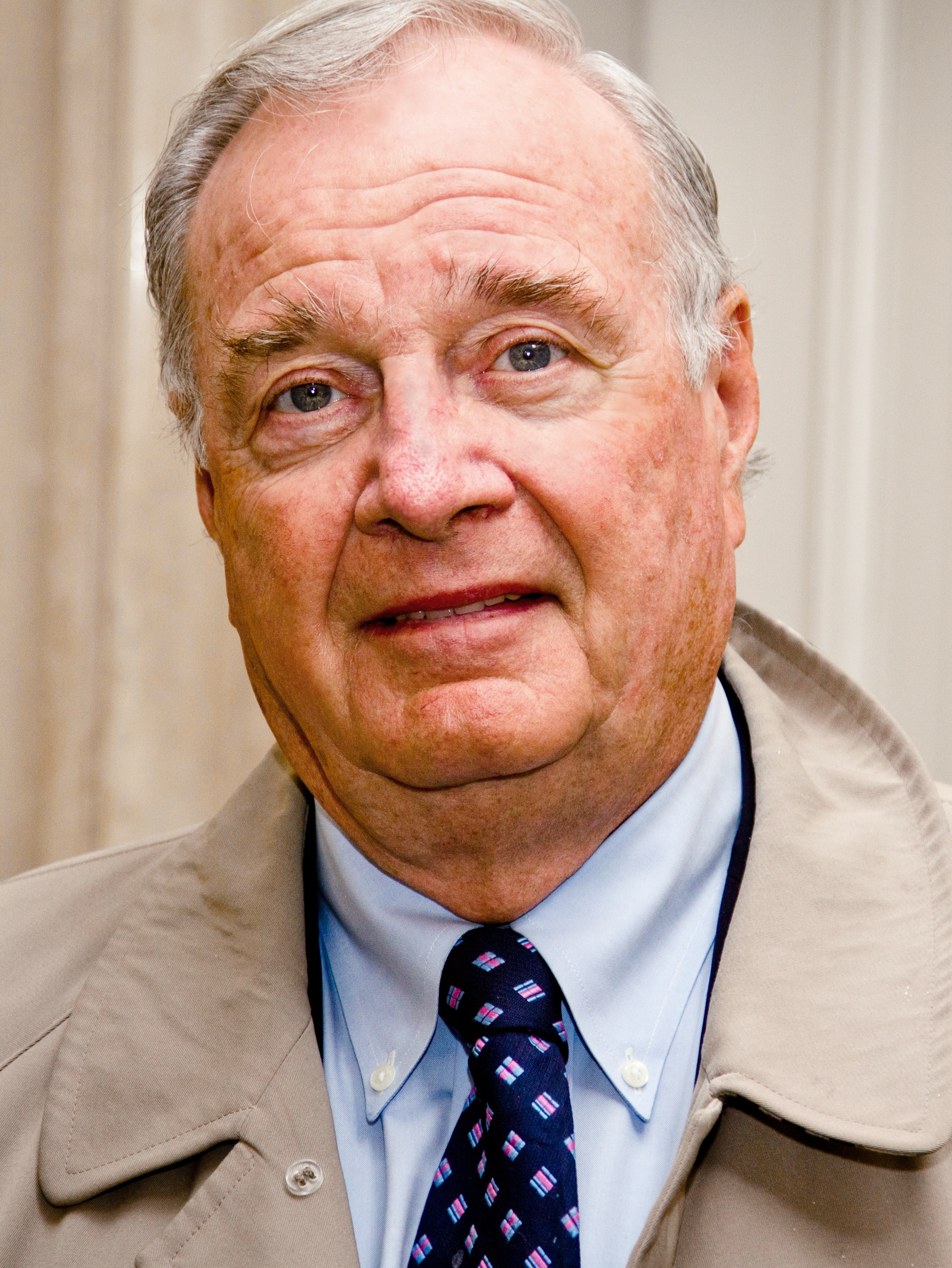
(Canada) Canada
Paul Martin,
Prime Minister

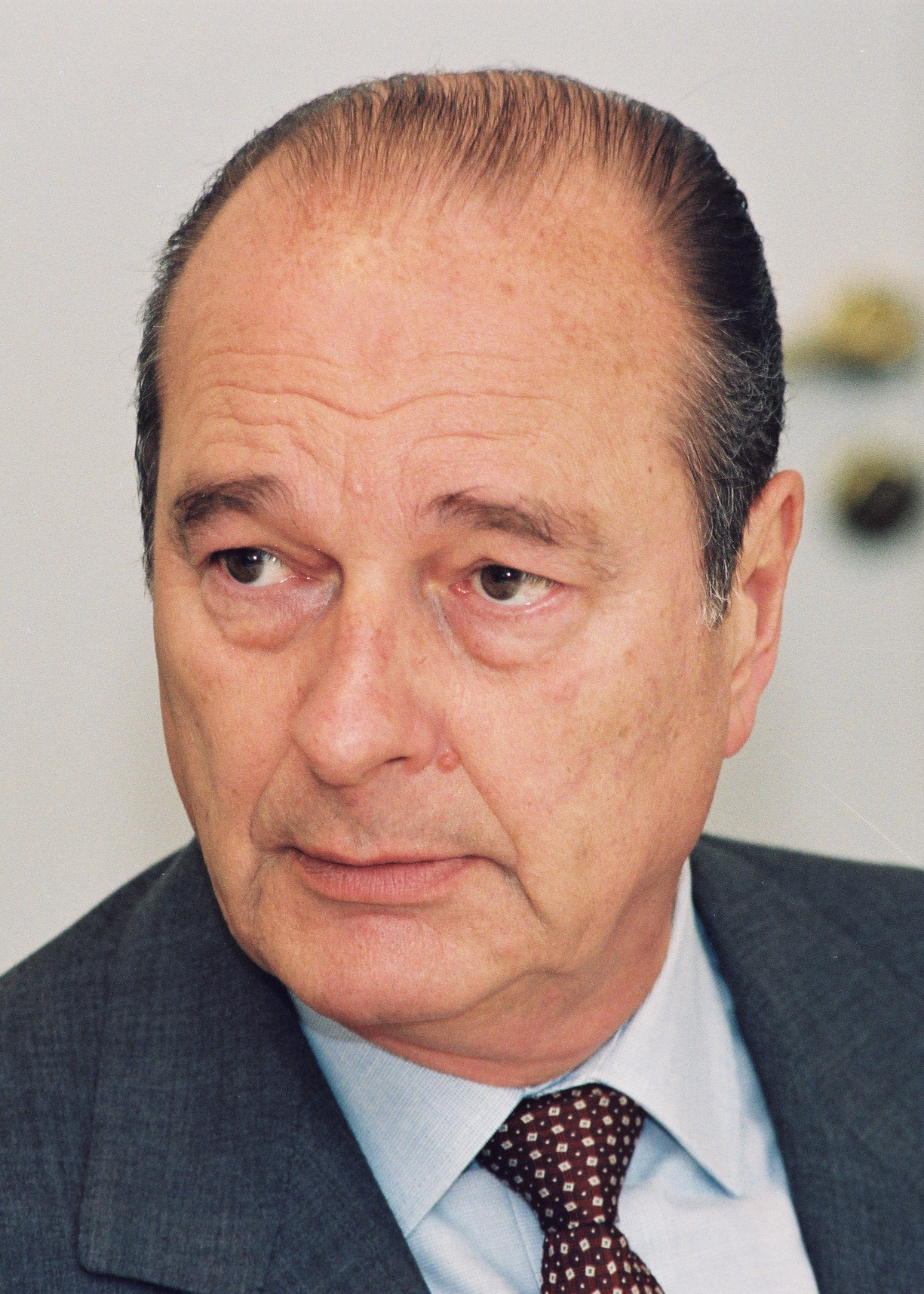
(France) France
Jacques Chirac,
President

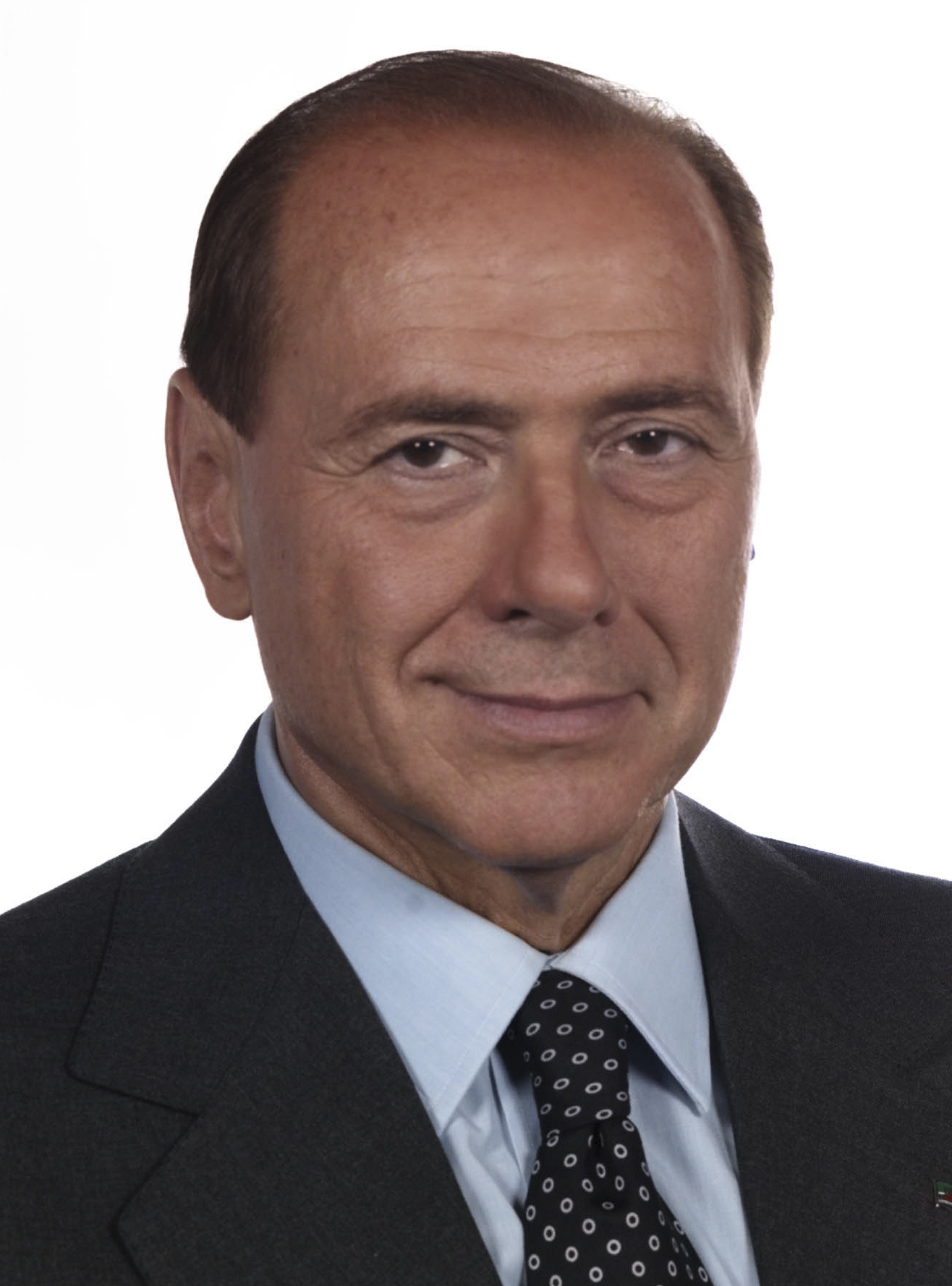
(Italy) Italy
Silvio Berlusconi,
Prime Minister

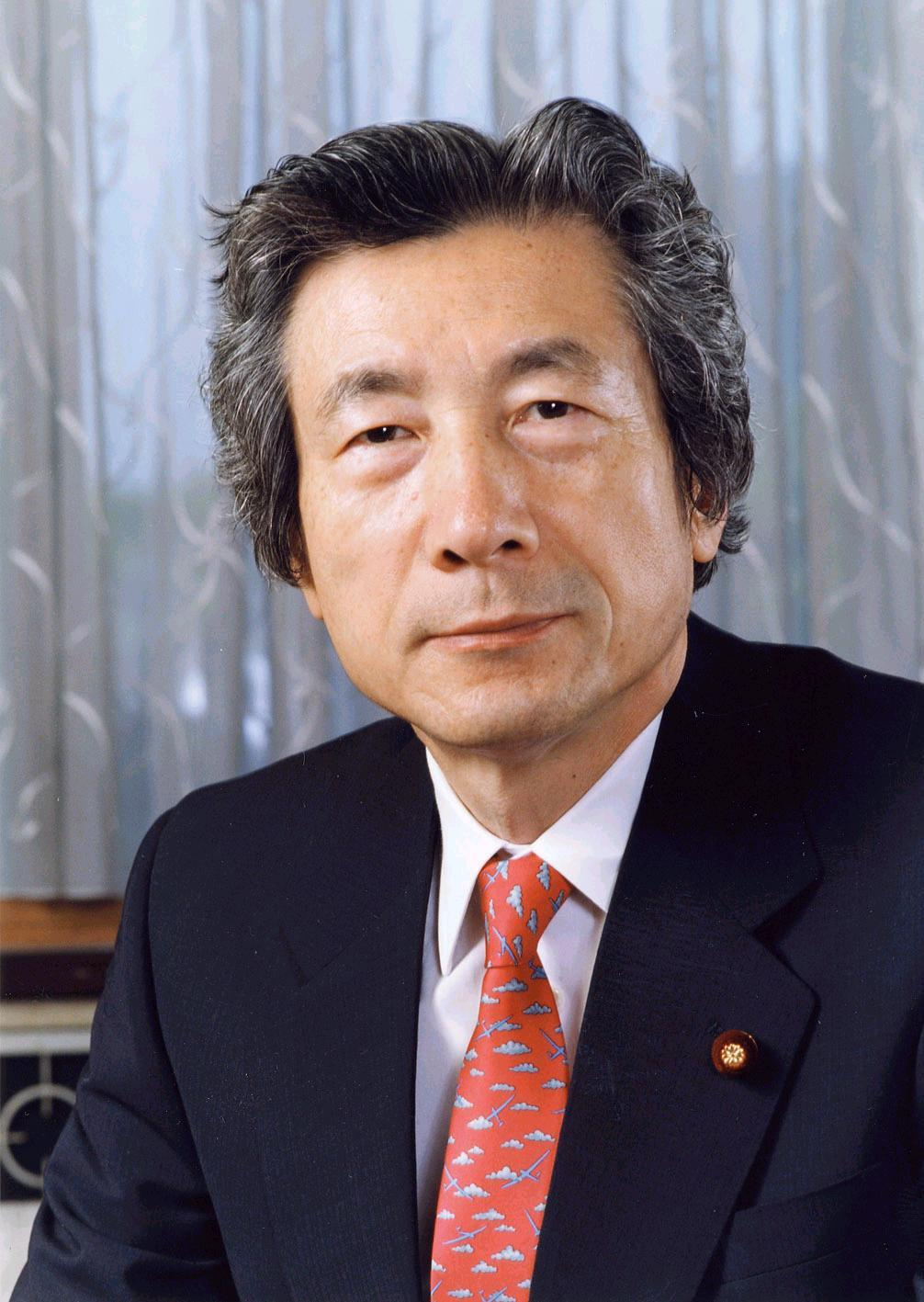
(Japan) Japan
Junichirō Koizumi,
Prime Minister

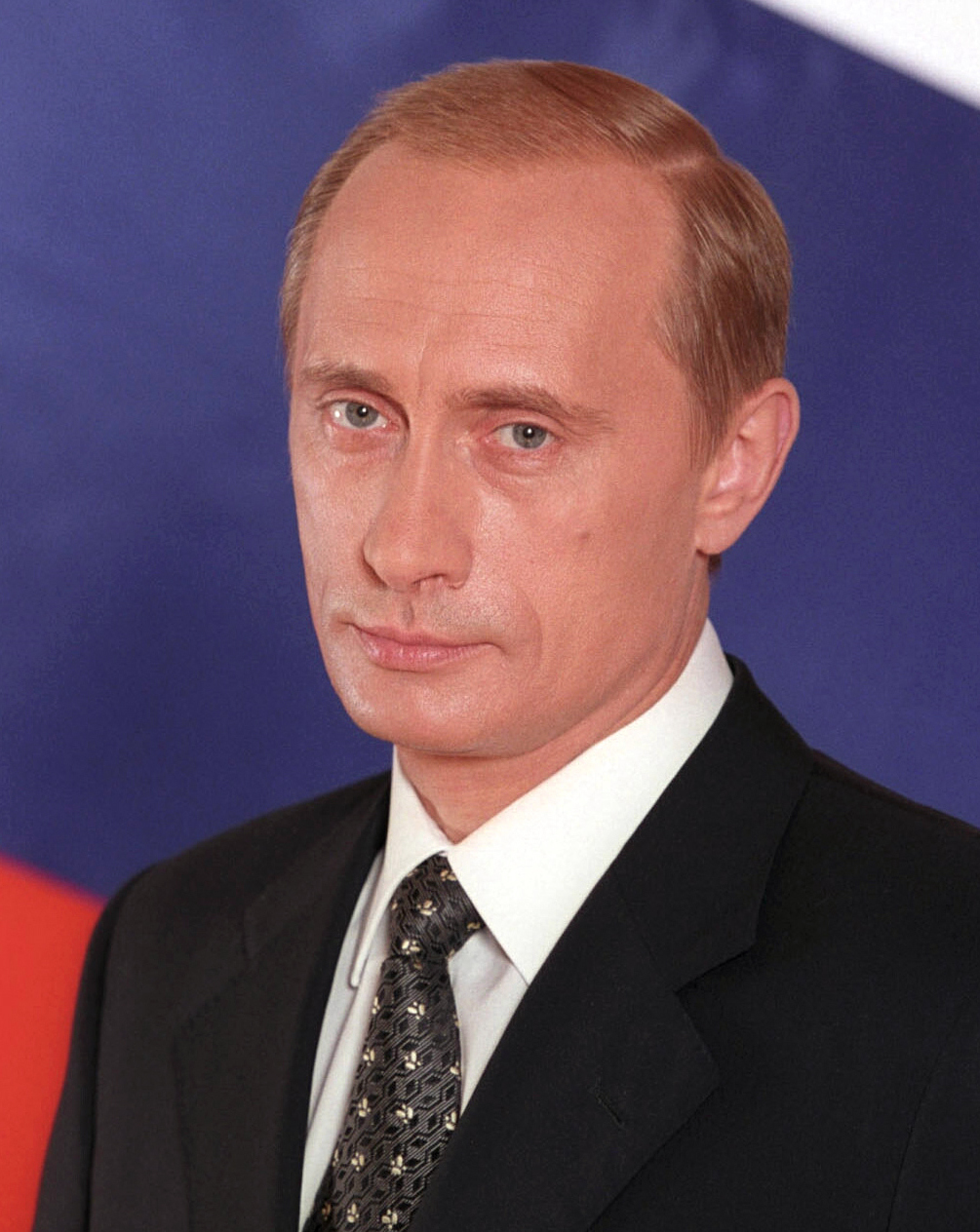
(Russia) Russia
Vladimir Putin,
President

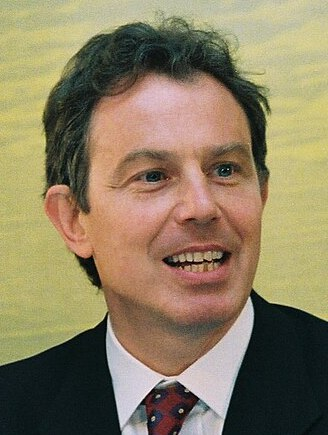
(United Kingdom) United Kingdom
Tony Blair,
Prime Minister (Host)

(United States) United States
George W. Bush,
President
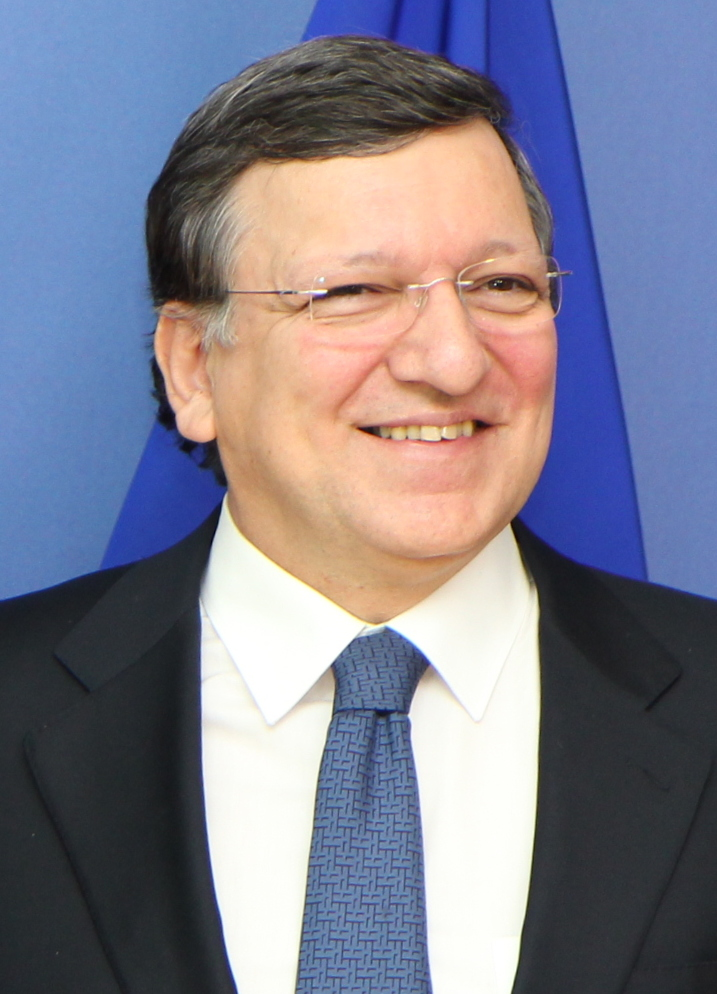
(European Union) European Union
Jose Manuel Barroso,
Commission President

== See also ==
- Clean Energy for Development Investment Framework

== Sources ==
- Bayne, Nicholas and Robert D. Putnam. (2005). Staying Together: the G8 summit Confronts the 21st Century. Aldershot, Hampshire, England: Ashgate Publishing. ISBN 978-0-7546-4267-1; OCLC 217979297
- Reinalda, Bob and Bertjan Verbeek. (1998). Autonomous Policy Making by International Organizations. London: Routledge. ISBN 978-0-415-16486-3; ISBN 978-0-203-45085-7; OCLC 39013643
