= 32nd G8 summit =

2006 international leader meeting in Russia

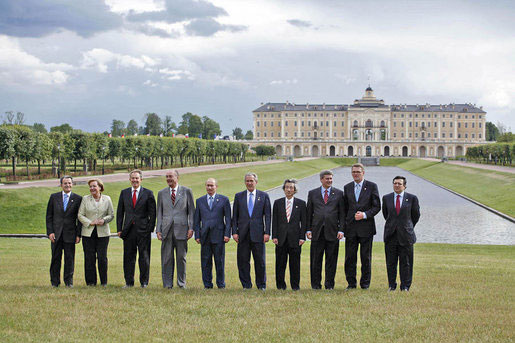
- Host country: Russia
- Dates: 15–17 July 2006
- Cities: Saint Petersburg
- Venues: Constantine Palace
- Follows: 31st G8 summit
- Precedes: 33rd G8 summit

The 32nd G8 summit was held on 15–17 July 2006 in Saint Petersburg, Russia. The venue was the Constantine Palace, which is located in Strelna on the Gulf of Finland. This was the first and only time Russia served as host nation for a G8 summit, confirming the nation's status as a full member of the G8.

== Overview ==
The Group of Seven (G7) is a forum which brings together the heads of the countries: France, Germany, Italy, Japan, the United Kingdom, the United States, and Canada starting in 1976. The G8, meeting for the first time in 1997, was formed with the addition of Russia. In addition, the president of the European Commission has been formally included in summits since 1981. The summits were not meant to be linked formally with wider international institutions; and in fact, a mild rebellion against the stiff formality of other international meetings was a part of the genesis of cooperation between France's president Valéry Giscard d'Estaing and West Germany's chancellor Helmut Schmidt as they conceived the initial summit of the Group of Six (G6) in 1975.

The G8 summits during the 21st century have inspired widespread debates, protests and demonstrations; and the two- or three-day event becomes more than the sum of its parts, elevating the participants, the issues and the venue as focal points for activist pressure.

== Composition of summit leaders ==
The G8 is an annual forum for the leaders of Canada, the European Commission, France, Germany, Italy, Japan, Russia, the United Kingdom, and the United States.

The 32nd G8 summit was the first summit for Canadian prime minister Stephen Harper and German chancellor Angela Merkel. It was also the last summit for French president Jacques Chirac and Japanese prime minister Junichiro Koizumi.

=== Participants ===
These summit participants are the current "core members" of the international forum:

**Core G8 members** Host state and leader are shown in bold text.
Member		Represented by	Title
(Canada)	Canada	Stephen Harper	Prime Minister
(France)	France	Jacques Chirac	President
(Germany)	Germany	Angela Merkel	Chancellor
(Italy)	Italy	Romano Prodi	Prime Minister
(Japan)	Japan	Junichiro Koizumi	Prime Minister
(Russia)	**Russia**	**Vladimir Putin**	**President**
(United Kingdom)	United Kingdom	Tony Blair	Prime Minister
(United States)	United States	George W. Bush	President
(European Union)	European Union	José Manuel Barroso	Commission President
(European Union)	European Union	Matti Vanhanen	Council President
**G8+5 invitees (countries)**
Member		Represented by	Title
(Brazil)	Brazil	Luiz Inácio Lula da Silva	President
(China)	China	Hu Jintao	General Secretary; President
(India)	India	Manmohan Singh	Prime Minister
(Mexico)	Mexico	Vicente Fox	President
(South Africa)	South Africa	Thabo Mbeki	President
**Guest invitees (international institutions)**
Member		Represented by	Title
	African Union	Alpha Oumar Konaré	Chairperson
(Commonwealth of Independent States)	Commonwealth of Independent States	Nursultan Nazarbayev	Executive Secretary
(International Atomic Energy Agency)	International Atomic Energy Agency	Mohamed ElBaradei	Director General
	International Energy Agency	Claude Mandil	Executive Director
(United Nations)	United Nations	Kofi Annan	Secretary-General
(UNESCO)	UNESCO	Kōichirō Matsuura	Director-General
	World Bank	Paul Wolfowitz	President
(World Health Organization)	World Health Organization	Anders Nordström	Director-General
	World Trade Organization	Pascal Lamy	Director-General

== Priorities ==
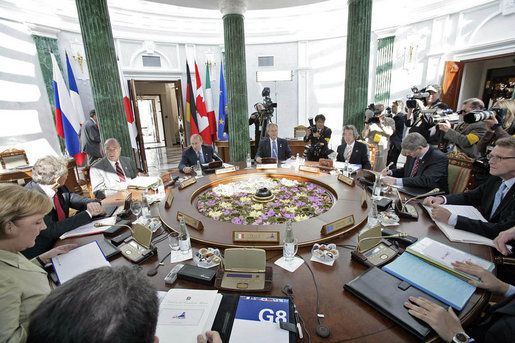
Heads of delegations in a working session

Traditionally, the host country of the G8 summit sets the agenda for negotiations, which take place primarily amongst multi-national civil servants in the weeks before the summit itself, leading to a joint declaration which all countries can agree to sign. Energy security, education, and the fight against infectious diseases were the main issues, with the conflict between Israel and Lebanon also attracting the attention of world leaders.

== Issues ==
The summit was intended as a venue for resolving differences among its members. As a practical matter, the summit was also conceived as an opportunity for its members to give each other mutual encouragement in the face of difficult economic decisions. This summit was primarily an economic forum for the global economic powerhouses; and the focus of this G8 Summit was discussion of economic issues. Some of the pressing items on the agenda:

- Open trade between Russia and the United States, including discussion of Russian entry into the World Trade Organization
- Multibillion-dollar aircraft manufacturing contracts, in light of strategy shifts at Airbus and Boeing and worsening airline business performance
- Free energy markets, especially regarding Russia and former Soviet republics, as well as petroleum from the Middle East
  - Nigeria, Venezuela, and the Persian Gulf regions have all had reduced energy exports in the past weeks due to various political and technical issues
  - Rights for exploration and exploitation of natural gas in Russia and the North Atlantic Ocean/Baltic Sea
  - Alternative energy forms, especially relaxing nuclear power regulations; and development of hydrogen as an economically viable energy platform
  - Security – both militarily and financially ensuring the future in energy supplies
- Discussion of economic impacts of global instability, drugs, and terrorism
- Education priorities for developed nations, especially encouraging businesses to support education
- Global system to monitor and contain infectious diseases

=== Israel–Lebanon crisis ===
The agenda set up by Russian president Vladimir Putin was largely overshadowed by the continuing violence in Israel and Lebanon. On 16 July, the leaders of the G8 nations agreed on a statement calling for an end to the fighting and the release of the Israeli soldiers. The leaders did not, however, go as far as calling for a ceasefire.

== Citizens' responses and authorities' counter-responses ==
During the week leading up to the summit (7–11 July), police in Moscow, St Petersburg and elsewhere around Russia detained somewhere between a few dozen to possibly two hundred human rights and political activists. Many of them were sentenced to ten days' imprisonment, preventing them from participating in protests surrounding the official summit. The Russian Deputy Internal Minister Alexander Chekalin said that the allegations of harassment were "from the realms of supposition" and that the police's actions were "commensurate with the situation at hand".

Cherie Blair, wife of the British prime minister and a human rights lawyer, slipped out of the summit to meet with local human rights groups and offer them free legal advice. Her leaving the summit was officially endorsed by Downing Street, and has reportedly furthered a rift between Britain and Russia.

== Accomplishments ==
The G8 summit is an international event which is observed and reported by news media, but the G8's continuing relevance after more than 30 years is somewhat unclear. More than one analyst suggests that a G8 summit is not the place to flesh out the details of any difficult or controversial policy issue in the context of a three-day event. Rather, the meeting offers an opportunity to bring a range of complex and sometimes inter-related issues. The G8 summit brings leaders together "not so they can dream up quick fixes, but to talk and think about them together."

=== Infrastructure Consortium for Africa ===
The Infrastructure Consortium for Africa (ICA) was established at the 31st G8 summit at Gleneagles, Scotland in the United Kingdom in 2005. Since that time, the ICA's annual meeting is traditionally hosted by the country holding the Presidency of the G8—in Germany in 2006.

== Recorded conversations ==
During the summit, a conversation between U.S. president George W. Bush and British prime minister Tony Blair was inadvertently recorded by a US TV crew preparing for a live broadcast.

The UK's Independent newspaper put a transcript of the conversation on its front page on 18 July, alongside some notes explaining the context of some of the comments; and the news story was widely disseminated by the international media. The paper singled out Bush's apparent snub of an offer by Blair to mediate in the 2006 Israel–Lebanon conflict, in favour of sending Condoleezza Rice. While Britons were upset with the perception that Blair was subordinate to Bush, in the US the fact that Bush used an expletive (claiming the conflict would not have escalated if Syria would have pressured Hezbollah to "stop doing this shit") was of greater concern.

== Business opportunity ==
For some, the G8 summit became a profit-generating event; as for example, the official G8 Summit magazines which have been published under the auspices of the host nations for distribution to all attendees since 1998.

== Controversial massage ==
During one meeting at the summit on 17 July, with all of the heads of state seated at a roundtable, U.S. president George W. Bush walked around the table to the position behind German chancellor Angela Merkel's chair, reached out his hands to Merkel's shoulders and started to give her a massage. Merkel quickly raised her hands in protest and Bush immediately withdrew his hands and resumed walking around the table. A video of the massage became a hit on YouTube, where many commentators likened it to sexual harassment.

== Gallery of participating leaders ==
=== Core G8 participants ===
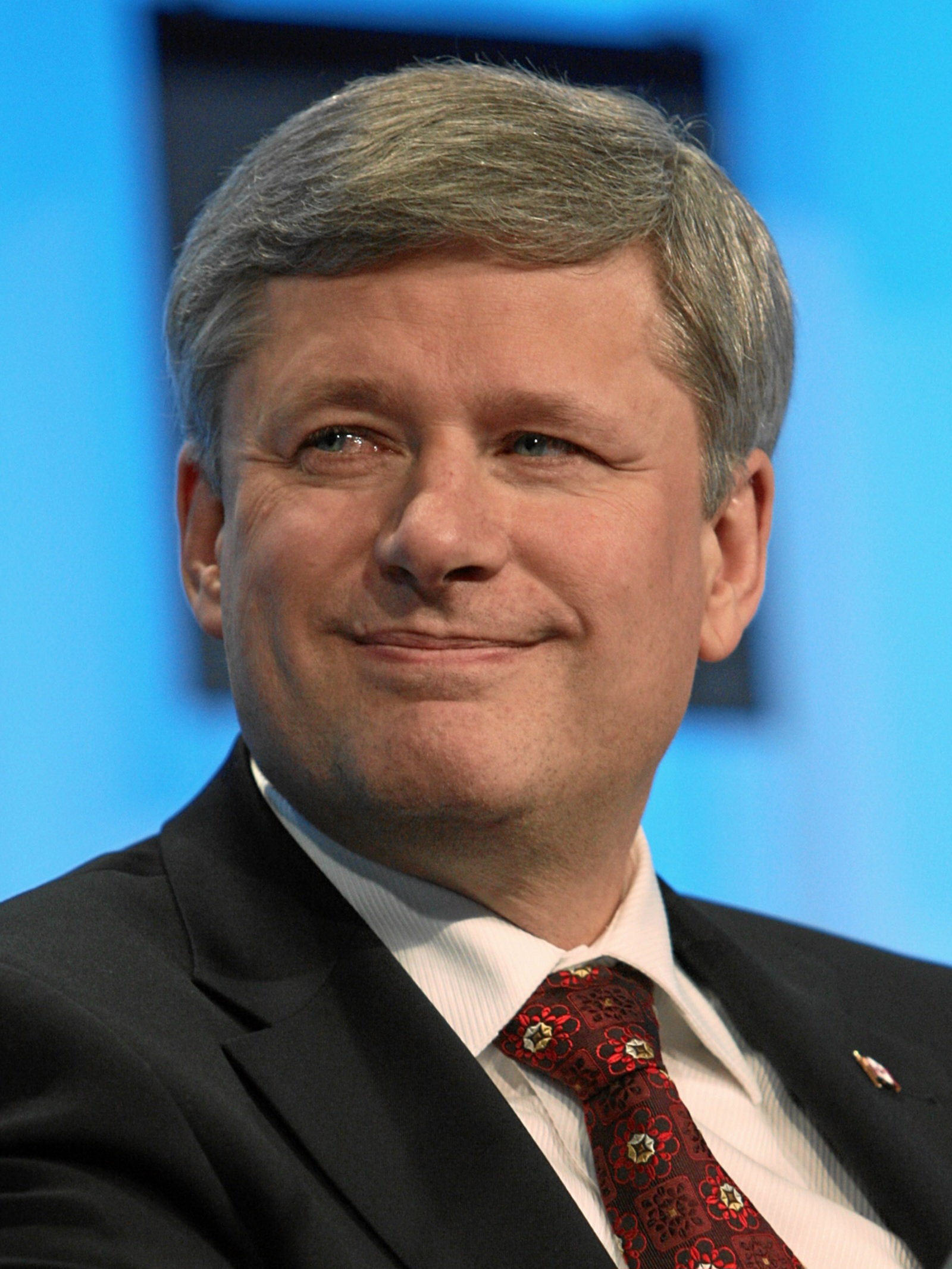
(Canada) Canada
Stephen Harper,
Prime Minister

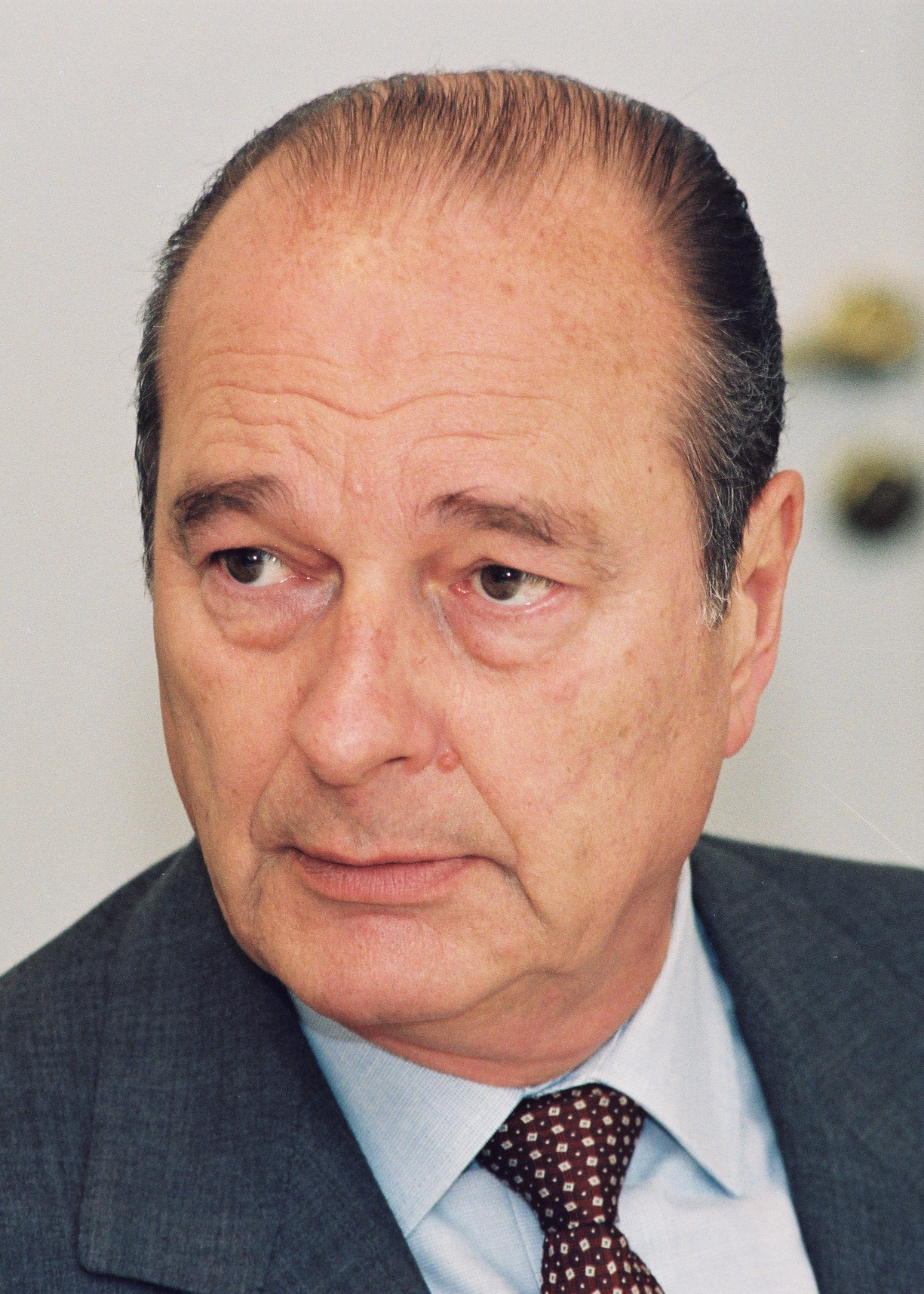
(France) France
Jacques Chirac,
President

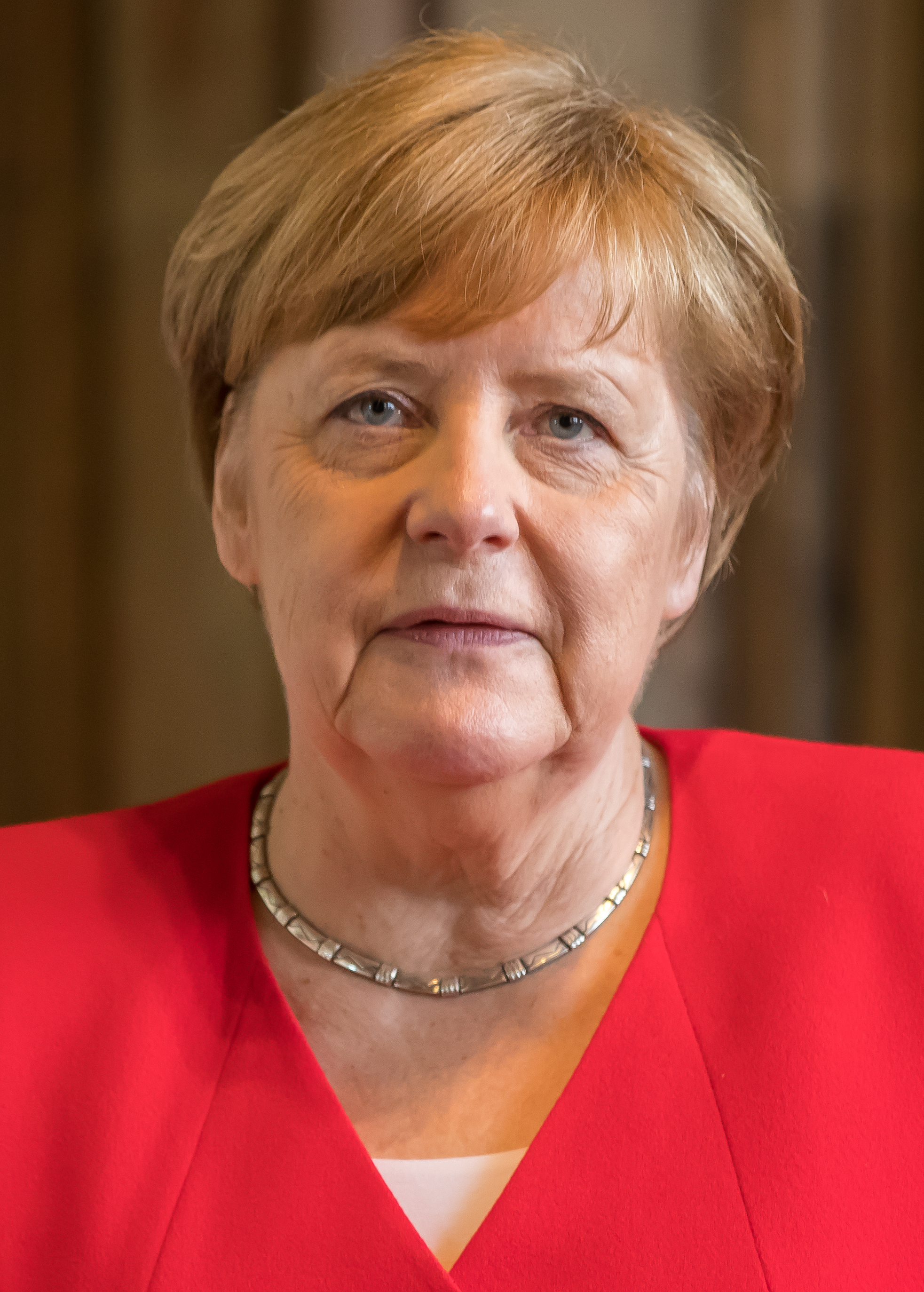
(Germany) Germany
Angela Merkel,
Chancellor

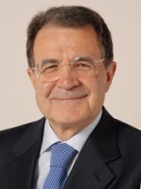
(Italy) Italy
Romano Prodi,
Prime Minister

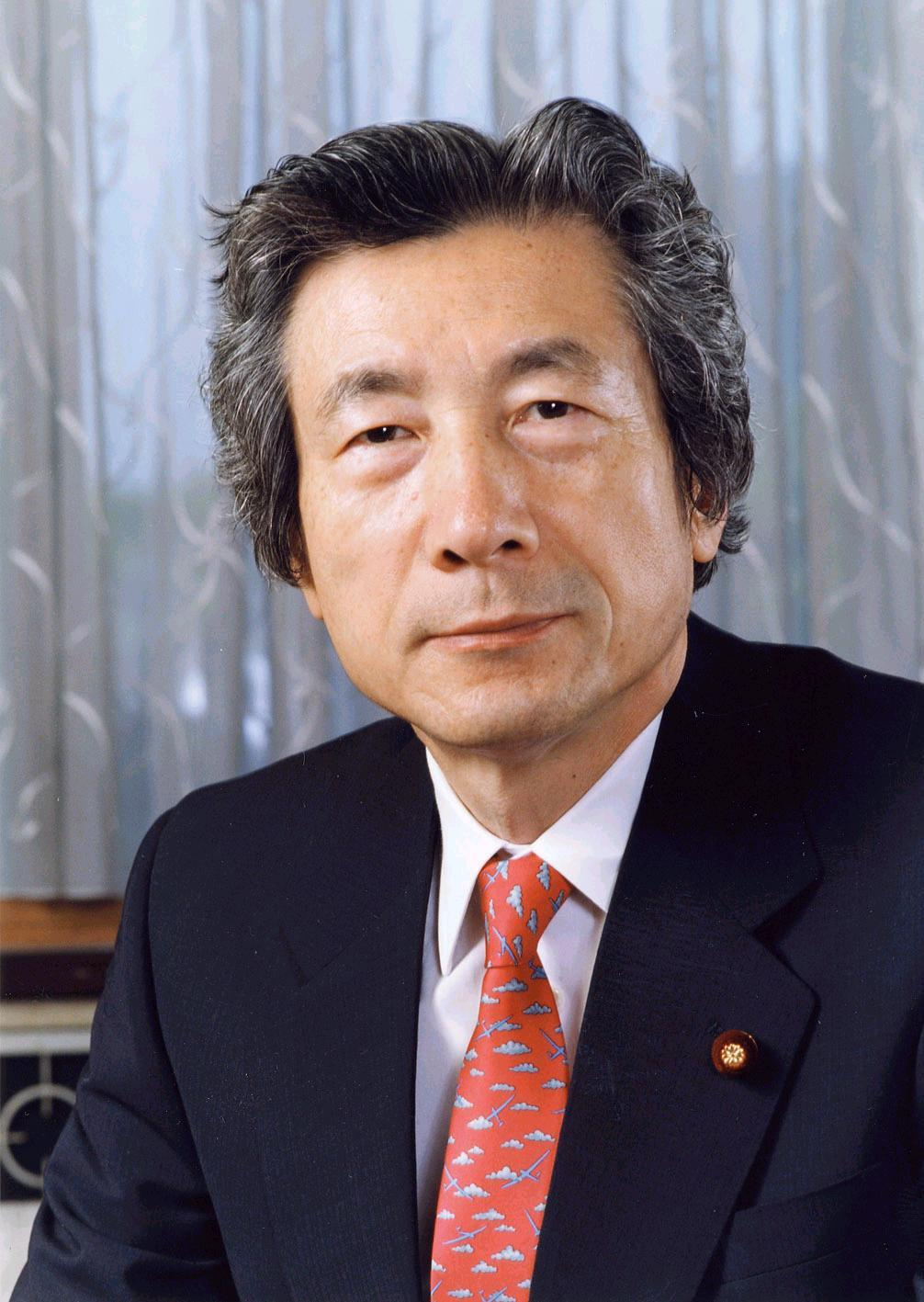
(Japan) Japan
Junichirō Koizumi,
Prime Minister

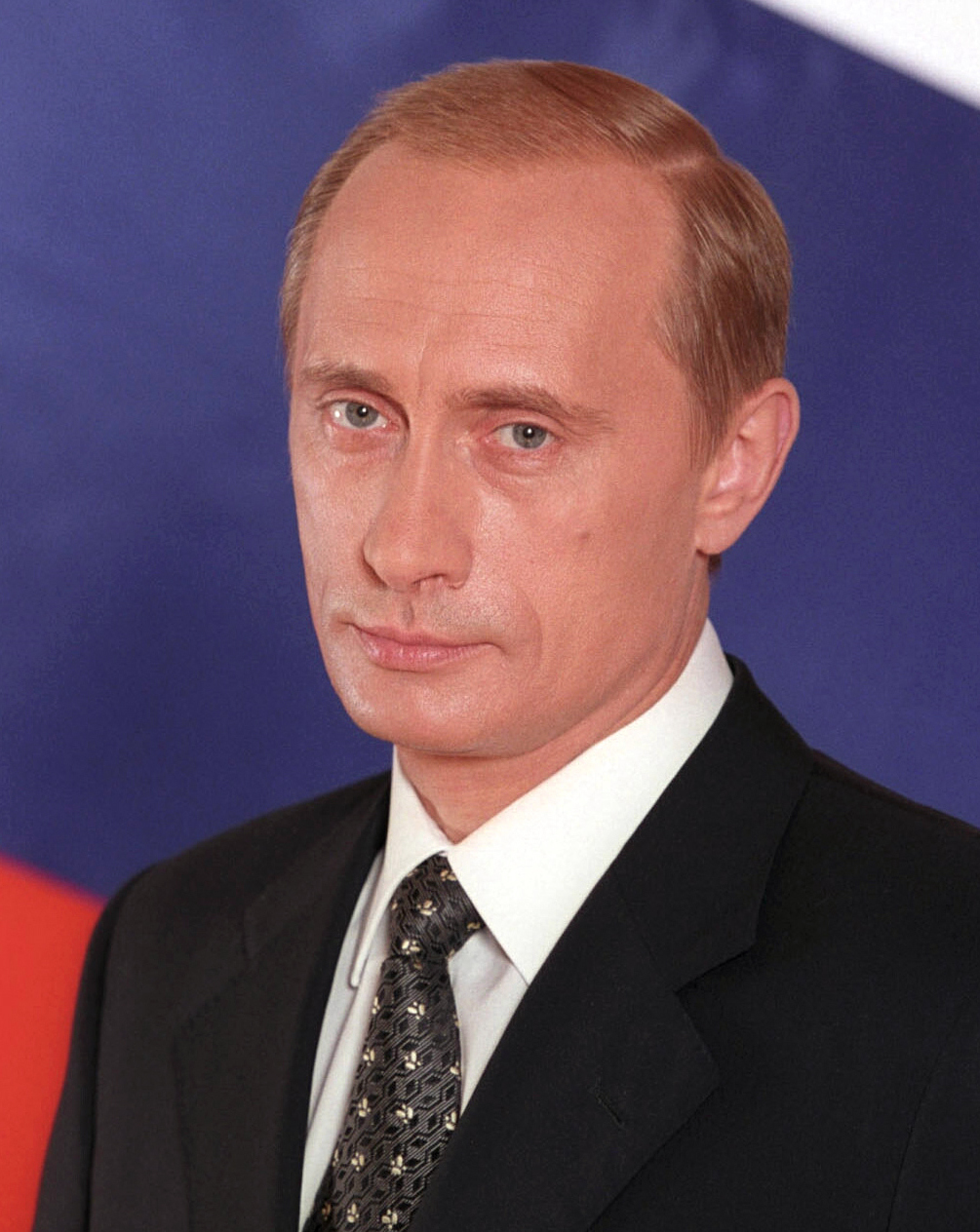
(Russia) Russia
Vladimir Putin,
President (Host)

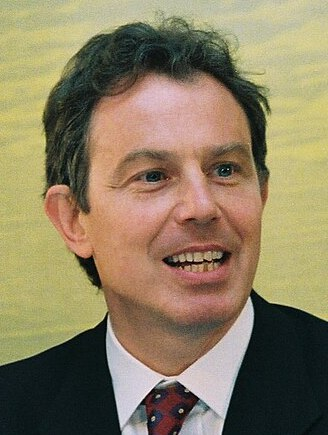
(United Kingdom) United Kingdom
Tony Blair,
Prime Minister

United States
George W. Bush,
President
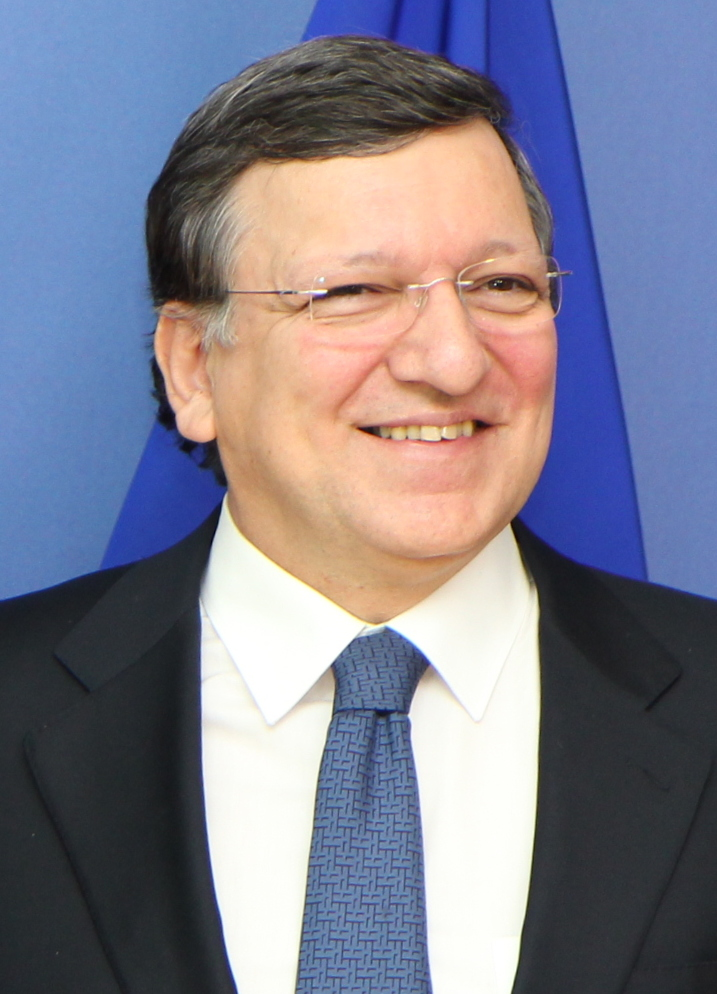
European Union
José Manuel Barroso, Commission President
