= Infrastructure Consortium for Africa =

Infrastructure Consortium for Africa Logo.

The Infrastructure Consortium for Africa (ICA) was launched at the 2005 G8 Gleneagles Summit, with the mission to help improve the lives and economic well-being of African people by supporting and promoting increased infrastructure investment from both public and private sources.

ICA also acts as a platform to increase infrastructure financing, help remove policy and technical barriers, facilitate greater cooperation, and increase knowledge through monitoring, reporting and sharing best practices.

== Sectors ==
ICA's work in infrastructure covers four sectors—energy, transport, water, and information and communication technology (ICT).

The ICA Water Platform (WP) was established in 2011 and is championed by Germany, which provides financial support and an infrastructure expert to supervise implementation of WP activities. The WP facilitates cooperation and matchmaking between ICA members, key African stakeholders and the private sector, including regular dialogue leading to joint investment activities.

ICA's WP encompasses all aspects of water infrastructure development in Africa, from water provision (e.g., potable water supply, sanitation, irrigation) to water resource management (e.g., storage, dams) and climate change (e.g., adaptation measures).

== Regional programmes ==
ICA recognizes that Africa needs transformative regional infrastructure projects if it is to meet its regional integration and trade objectives. To this end, ICA members champion four regional programmes: Horn of Africa Initiative, Eastern & Central Transport Corridors, North-South Corridor and West Africa Power Pool.

ICA also supports the African Union Programme for Infrastructure Development in Africa (PIDA), which is setting the framework for priority continental and regional investments in energy, transport, water, and ICT.

== Membership ==
ICA members include:

- G8 countries (Canada, France, Germany, Italy, Japan, Russia, United Kingdom, United States)
- World Bank Group
- African Development Bank (AfDB) Group
- European Commission
- European Investment Bank
- Development Bank of Southern Africa

Most recently, ICA enlarged its membership to include all G20 countries (G8 countries, plus Argentina, Australia, Brazil, China, European Union, India, Indonesia, Mexico, Saudi Arabia, South Africa, South Korea, Turkey).

Membership on the African side is led by the AfDB, while the African Union Commission, the New Partnership for Africa's Development (NEPAD), and Regional Economic Communities participate as observers in ICA meetings.

== Secretariat ==
ICA is supported by a small Secretariat that is funded by voluntary contributions from ICA members, and staffed by a combination of permanent AfDB staff, consultants and experts on secondment from ICA member countries.

ICA is hosted by the AfDB in Abidjan, Ivory Coast.

== See also ==
- Department for International Development
- New Partnership for Africa's Development
- African Development Bank
- 32nd G8 summit
- 33rd G8 summit
