= International Finance Facility =

An International Finance Facility (IFF) is a bond issued against the security of donor government guarantees to maintain future aid flows for the purpose of international development.

Bonds are issued on global capital markets, against the security of government guarantees, which would be used to buy back the bonds over a longer period. This financial contractual arrangement allows a large amount of aid to flow sooner, at the expense of less aid in the future.

Critics have raised concerns that the poorest countries in particular do not have the ability to efficiently spend such large amounts of aid whilst avoiding corruption, and that their economies may not be able to cope with such rapid change either.

== History ==
The concept of an International Finance Facility was first was proposed in the United Kingdom in January 2003 by HM Treasury in conjunction with the Department for International Development. The IFF were designed to frontload aid to help meet the Millennium Development Goals.

Official development assistance donors were committed to reaching the target of 0.7 per cent ODA/GNI and the IFF is a mechanism to accomplish that goal. The International Development Association as well as the World Bank Group promoted the IFF idea.

== International Finance Facility for Immunisation ==
The first IFF is the "International Finance Facility for Immunisation" (IFFIm), begun by France, the UK and other European countries in 2006. "IFFIm was established as a charity with the Charity Commission for England and Wales and is registered in England and Wales as a company limited by guarantee with number 5857343 and as a charity with number 1115413" without share capital for indefinite duration under the Companies Act 1985. IFFIm was initiated to rapidly accelerate the availability and predictability of funds for immunisation, in programmes for over 70 of the poorest countries around the world. "Through its bond issuances, IFFlm converts long-term government pledges into immediately available cash resources."

IFFIm sells bonds - officially called Vaccine Bonds - on the capital markets to raise funds for the GAVI Alliance, a public-private partnership which works to save children’s lives and protect people’s health by increasing access to vaccination in developing countries. In 2008, Daiwa Securities Group provided in a package some of the capital market funds.

IFFIm was, as of July 2012, backed by the United Kingdom, France, Italy, Spain, the Netherlands, Sweden, Norway, Australia and South Africa. Brazil has pledged to become IFFIm's tenth donor. IFFIm was, as of May 2018, backed by the same nine countries.

IFFIm "front loads financing for vaccines by issuing vaccine bonds backed by the legally binding pledges from donors."

To date, IFFIm has leveraged US$6.3 billion in donor pledges to raise US$4.5 billion (July 2013) on the world’s capital markets from both retail and institutional investors. The World Bank is IFFIm's treasury manager. Since IFFIm began in 2006, IFFIm funding has allowed GAVI to nearly double its expenditures in health programmes. US$2.2 billion in IFFIm funding already has been disbursed to support vaccine purchase and delivery for 70 developing countries.

Health care consulting firm HLSP issued an independent evaluation of IFFIm in July 2011 that strongly commended its financial model and health care results. The report noted that not only do IFFIm-funded investments generate “extremely good returns,” but also that it likely helped GAVI save more than 2.1 million lives. The report focused on IFFIm’s cost-effectiveness, particularly the benefits of frontloading and its impact on creating large-scale immunity.

IFFIm provides certainty of funding for both GAVI and recipient countries, aiding long-term planning and short-term needs. For example, US$545 million in proceeds from IFFIm funded tactical purchases that helped prevent 1.4 million deaths from yellow fever, polio and measles. Dedicated IFFIm funding also played a significant role in combating 600,000 cases of meningitis and maternal and neonatal tetanus.

In addition, IFFIm helped GAVI fund breakthrough vaccines quickly and securely. IFFIm financed more than 90% of the guaranteed payment to UNICEF for initial doses of a pentavalent vaccine which immunises against five infectious diseases: diphtheria, tetanus, pertussis, haemophilus influenzae type B (Hib) and hepatitis B. GAVI could not have made that commitment and upfront cash payment without IFFIm.

In December 2014 IFFIm issued its first Vaccine Sukuk, which was "a three-year, US$500 million transaction that was the largest debut Sukuk ever issued by a supranational organisation."
