= 2022 Japan heat wave =

Meteorological history
- Duration: 28 June - 25 August 2022
- Heat event
- Max temp: 40.2 °C (104.4 °F), recorded at Isesaki

Overall effects
- Fatalities: None
- Areas affected: Japan

The 2022 Japan heatwave was a heatwave that affected many prefectures. Temperatures peaked at 40.2 °C (104.4 °F) in Isesaki, Gunma Prefecture. 15,657 people were taken to hospital emergency departments, 5,261 of whom were admitted.

The heat dome was attributed to climate change and La Niña.

== Heatwave ==
In June 2022, high pressure over the Pacific Ocean caused a south to south-westerly flow of air, introducing hotter air from the tropics to Japan, fuelling higher temperatures. Meteorologist Jodie Woodcock attributed the heat dome to a combination of climate change and La Niña conditions. The heatwave began on 28 June and lasted until August, and was the hottest heat wave in Japanese history since records began in 1875. Isesaki, a city in Gunma Prefecture, saw the highest national temperatures of 40.2 °C (104.4 °F), while temperatures in Tokyo reached at least 35 °C (95 °F) for nine consecutive days.

Japan's rainy season was declared over on 27 June, 22 days earlier in the year than usual, and the earliest end since 1951.

== History ==
Tokyo suffered an extreme heatwave one hundred years earlier, which peaked at 35.7 °C (96.3 °F) on 7 August 1922.

Japan was also badly affected by the 2018 Northeast Asia heat wave, which saw 41.1 °C (106.0 °F) being reached in Kumagaya, 65 km (40 mi) northwest of Tokyo, constituting an all-time high for all of Japan. Other cities recorded temperatures near 40 °C (104 °F), with Kyoto temperatures exceeding 38 °C (100 °F) for seven days in a row for the first time since records began. Over 1,000 people died in the 2018 heatwave.

Overall, the summer of 2022 was the second hottest on record for Japan.

== Impact ==
15,657 people were taken to hospital emergency department. 439 required more than a three-week hospitalisation, with 5,261 being kept in hospital for a shorter amount of time.

Nuclear power stations were used to meet the increased demand for electricity. Japanese Prime Minister Fumio Kishida told people to ration air conditioning in order to conserve the limited electricity supplies. Tohoku Electric Power Company advised that the demand for power would put the national grid under strain. Yasutoshi Nishimura, minister for the economy and industry, said that while the public's enthusiasm for nuclear power diminished following the 2011 Fukushima nuclear disaster, the government was considering all power generating options, in light of the power shortage created by the heatwave.

Insurance companies Sompo Holdings and Sumitomo Life Insurance both started offering insurance policies designed to cover costs associated with heatstroke.

== See also ==
- Fire and Disaster Management Agency (Japan)
