= Global warming (disambiguation) =

Global warming is the ongoing increase in global average temperature that is causing climate change.

Global warming may also refer to:

- a long-term rise in:
  - global surface temperature
  - ocean heat content
  - ocean temperature
  - sea surface temperature
- Earth's Energy Imbalance, a measurable change in the planet's radiative equilibrium which quantifies its heating (or cooling) rate
- Global Warming (Pitbull album), 2012
- Global Warming (Sonny Rollins album), 1998
- Global Warming: The Signs and The Science, a 2005 documentary film made by ETV
- Global Warming: What You Need to Know, a 2006 documentary directed by Nicolas Brown
- "Global Warming", a 2005 song by Gojira from the album From Mars to Sirius
- "Global Warming", a 2008 song by The Acacia Strain from the album Continent (vinyl edition)
- "Global Warming", a 2022 song by Sasha Alex Sloan from the album I Blame the World

== See also ==
- Global Warning (disambiguation)
