= Climate change in Japan =

Emissions, impacts and responses of Japan related to climate change

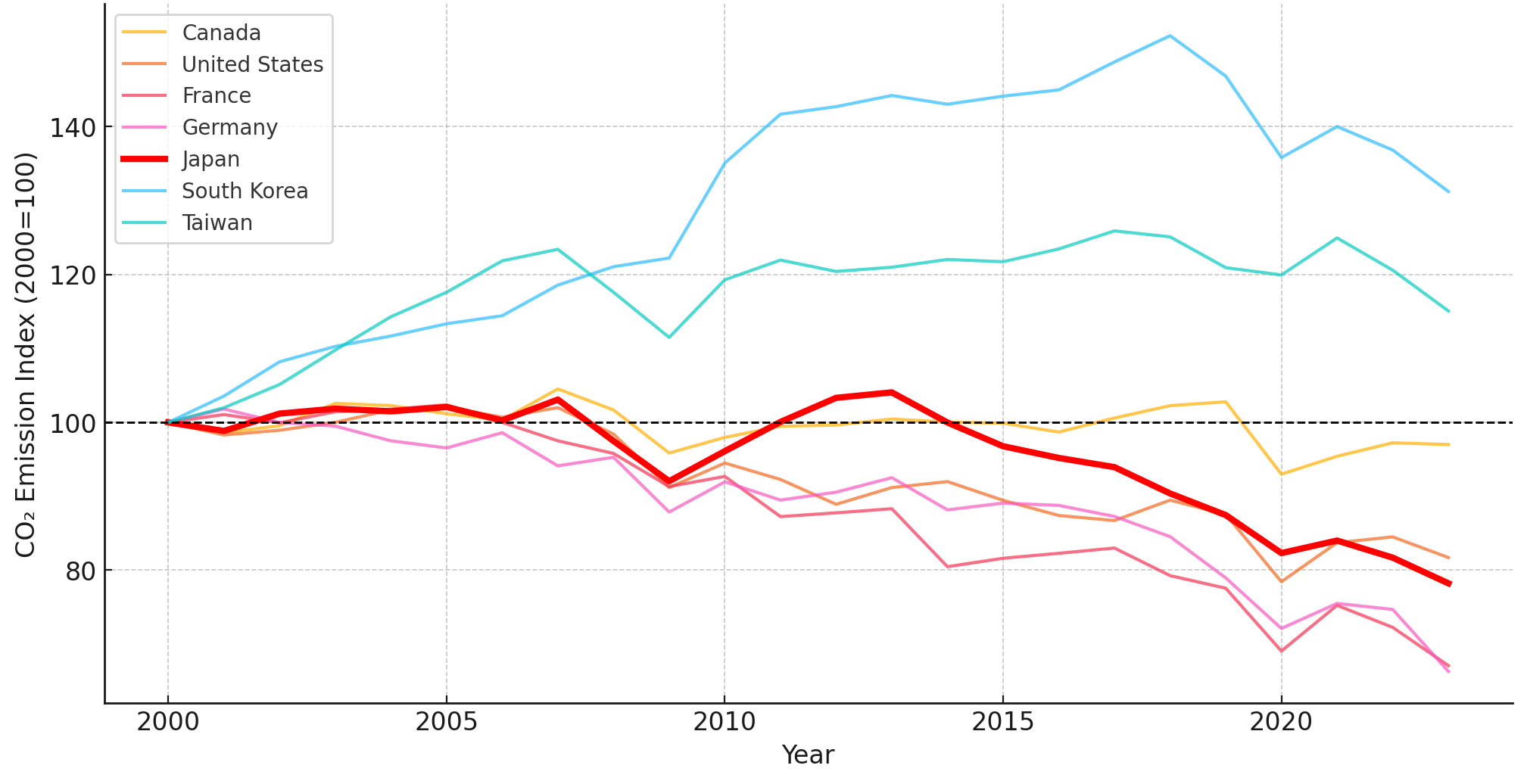
Japan and other countries' carbon emissions between 2000 and 2023: Japan has reduced its emissions by 22% since 2000.

Climate change is impacting the human population and environment of Japan. In recent years, the country has observed notable changes in its climate patterns, with rising temperatures serving as a prominent indicator of this phenomenon. The nation experiences a broad range of climates, spanning from the frigid winters of Hokkaido to the subtropical climates of Okinawa. Changes in temperature patterns have the potential to disrupt ecosystems, impact agricultural productivity, modify water resources, and pose significant challenges to infrastructure and human settlements.

Japanese government is increasingly enacting climate change policy to respond. The government has been criticised for lacking a credible plan to get to its pledged net zero greenhouse gas emissions by 2050. As a signatory of the Kyoto Protocol, and host of the 1997 conference which created it, Japan is under treaty obligations to reduce its carbon dioxide emissions and to take other steps related to curbing climate change.

== Greenhouse gas emissions ==
Out of the global GHG emissions, Japan is responsible for 2.6%. The average rate of CO_{2} emissions per person in Japan is almost double the global average. Emissions have been slightly reduced since 2013 and the net zero emissions are set by 2050.

Japan is one of the largest greenhouse gas emitters, both nationally and per person.

Japan has pledged to become carbon neutral by 2050. In 2019 Japan emitted 1212 Mt CO_{2eq}, The per capita CO_{2} emissions were 9.31 tonnes in 2017 and was the 5th largest producer of carbon emissions. As of 2019 greenhouse gas emissions by Japan are over 2% of the annual world total, partly because coal supplies over 30% of its electricity. Coal-fired power stations were still being constructed in 2021 some may become stranded assets.

Carbon dioxide emissions from energy, 2011-2021 (Mt CO_{2})
2011	2012	2013	2014	2015	2016	2017	2018	2019	2020	2021
1237.3	1324.5	1314.1	1280.4	1239.9	1220.2	1214.1	1192.4	1151.4	1058.3	1081.7

Calculations in 2021 show that to give the world a 50% chance of avoiding a temperature rise of 2 degrees or more, Japan should increase its climate commitments by 49%. For a 95% chance, it should increase the commitments by 151%. For a 50% chance of staying below 1.5 degrees, Japan should increase its commitments by 229%. A March 2021 analysis by Climate Action Tracker said that Japan should reduce greenhouse gas emissions so that by 2030 the emissions are 60% below 2013 levels; this would support a goal of limiting warming to 1.5 °C.

CO_{2} emission by sector
Sector	2019	2021
Energy	432.93	430
Industry	279.2	269
Transportation	198.58	178
Commercial industry	64.71	59.9
Households	53.36	51.6
Industrial processes	45.17	43
Waste	30.88	29.9
Other	3.11	2.9

Furthermore, Japan has witnessed a decrease in its annual emissions, with a 5.3% reduction in industrial emissions due to decreased steel production. Residential emissions fell by 1.4%, while vehicle emissions rose by 3.9%. Despite these changes, Japan still heavily relies on fossil fuels, which constitute about 70% of its power generation. In terms of renewable energy, Japan aims for 10 gigawatts of offshore wind capacity by 2030 but is currently projected to only reach 4.4 gigawatts.

On 18 February 2025, Japan has set new targets to cut greenhouse gas emissions by 60% by 2035 and 73% by 2040, while aiming for renewables to provide 50% of its electricity by 2040. The revised energy and industrial policies focus on decarbonization, energy security, and economic growth, despite challenges in offshore wind energy and nuclear power.

=== Transportation ===
The transportation sector accounts for 20% out of the total emission of Japan. Within the transportation sector, it is mainly oil that is being used. This particular sector currently relies on fossil fuels and is projected to continue doing so for a while. One challenge to decarbonize the transportation sector is the cost of such technologies required for the transformation. Emissions have been decreasing within the sector since 2001 due to fuel efficiency of cars and population decline.

=== Energy supply and fossil fuels ===
The energy supply is mainly made out of fossil fuels, reaching up to 88% of the total primary energy supply in 2019. The fossil fuels are composed of a combination of oil (38%), coal (27%) and gas (23%). In 2012, the Fukushima disaster led to an increase in Japan's dependence on fossil fuels. The country's energy supply has been impacted by the phasing out of nuclear power, with only 4% of the supply coming from nuclear sources in 2019 compared to 15% in 2010. Fossil fuel is mainly imported and the high dependence on the non-renewable sources is making it difficult to reach a carbon-neutral society. Out of Japan's total primary energy supply, only 8% is made out of renewable sources; however, this has been doubled since 1990.

=== Industrial emissions ===
Although Japan is a developed country, it still has a large presence of energy-intensive industries (such as the production of steel and cement) compared to other developed economies. The country has a high energy consumption that can be compared to emerging countries like China, India, and Brazil. In Japan, the overall industrial emissions domestically account for approximately 967.4 million tons of CO_{2} annually. Among the industries the iron and steel sector has the highest emission rate, accounting for around 111.9 million tons of CO_{2}.

=== Current Emissions Overview ===
According to data released by the Ministry of Environment, Japan's total greenhouse gas emissions for the fiscal year ending in March 2023 declined by 2.3%, amounting to 1.085 billion metric tons of CO_{2} equivalent. This reduction marks a 23% decrease compared to the levels recorded in 2013. Despite this progress, Japan is yet to meet its ambitious target of a 46% reduction by 2030. The primary contributor to this decrease was the industrial sector, which saw a 5.3% drop in emissions, largely due to a decrease in steel production and a corresponding reduction in power demand. In addition, residential emissions decreased by 1.4%. However, not all sectors showed a decline; emissions from the transportation sector, for example, increased by 3.9%.

On the renewable energy front, Japan has set a target to achieve 10 gigawatts of offshore wind power by 2030. Yet, projections suggest that Japan is on pace to reach only 4.4 gigawatts by the end of the decade, indicating significant challenges ahead in meeting its renewable energy goals.

== Impacts on the natural environment ==
=== Temperature and weather changes ===
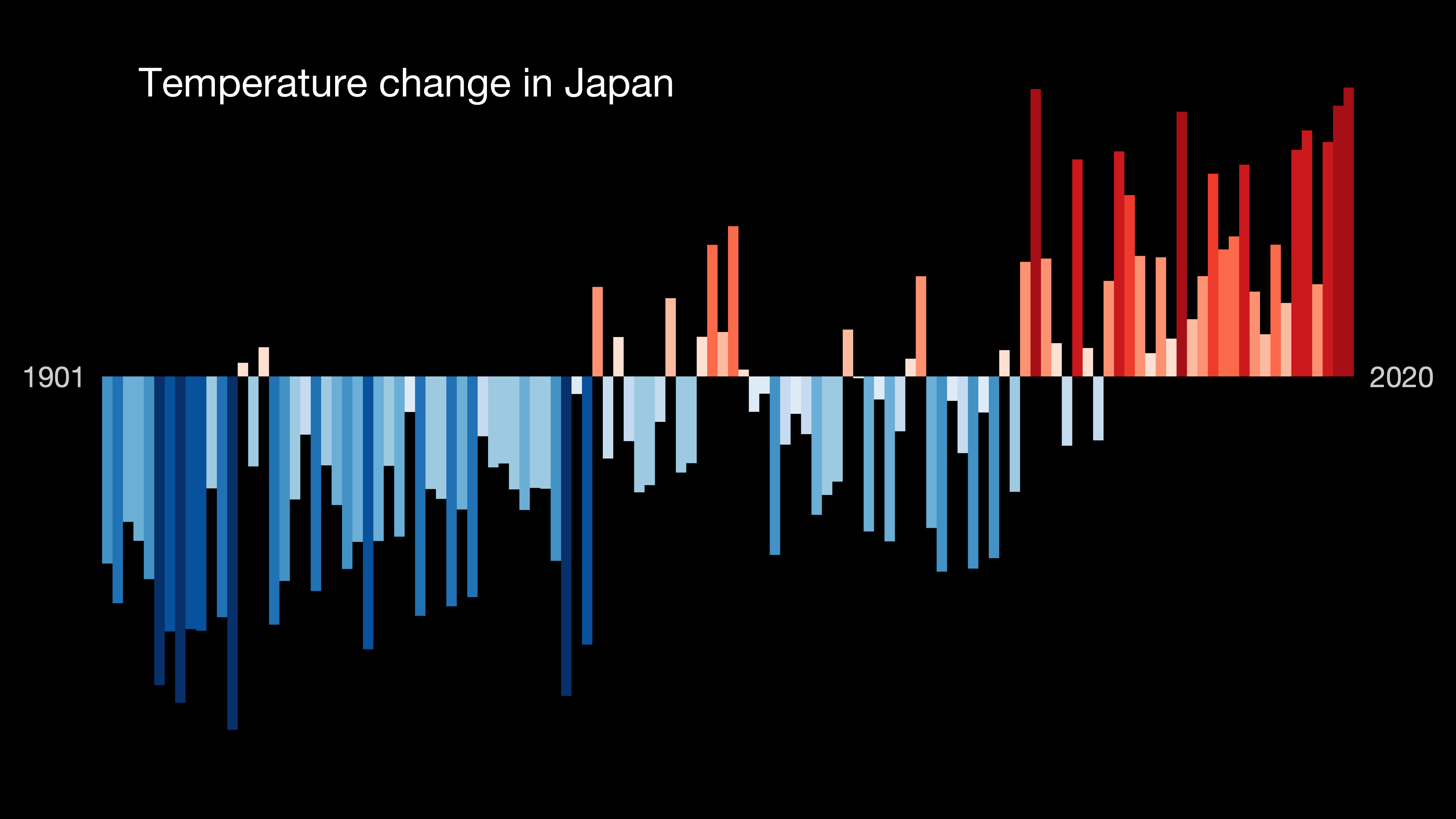
Average annual temperature anomaly in Japan, 1901 to 2020

==== Temperature ====
Köppen climate classification map for Japan for 1980–2016

2071–2100 map under the most intense climate change scenario. Mid-range scenarios are currently considered more likely.

Climate change has affected Japan drastically. The temperature and rainfall have increased rapidly in the years leading up to 2020. This has resulted in immature rice grains and also oranges that automatically get separated from their skin due to immature growth by inappropriate weather. Many corals in the Japanese seas and oceans have died due to rising sea temperatures and ocean acidification. Tiger mosquitoes, which transmit dengue fever, were found further north than before.

Earth Simulator calculations reveal the daily increase in mean temperature in Japan during the period 2071 to 2100. The temperature will increase by 3.0 °C in Scenario B1 and 4.2 °C in A1B compared to that of 1971 to 2000. Similarly, the daily maximum temperature in Japan will increase by 3.1 °C in B1 and 4.4 °C in A1B. The precipitation in summer in Japan will increase steadily due to global warming (annual average precipitation will increase by 17% in Scenario B1 and by 19% in Scenario A1B during the period 2071–2100 compared to that of 1971–2000).

Considering the projections in temperature for Japan, depending on the scenario there are different outcomes. In a worst-case scenario for 2100, where GHG emissions are not declining, an increase of almost 6 °C is expected during winter and almost 5 °C for summer in comparison to the annual in 1900. If a drastic reduction in emissions occurs then the increases will be almost 2 °C and 1,5 °C respectively by 2100.

==== Precipitation ====
Precipitation in Japan varies between 1000mm to 2,500mm annually, causing various events depending on the year, either flooding or lack of water availability for sectors such as agriculture. It is also more complex to predict in any case scenario the effects of climate change, easily, for precipitation. Extreme rainfall events are more frequent the total annual precipitation seems to decrease.

==== Extreme weather events ====
Typhoon, Okinawa, Japan 2010

Climate change will not only affect parameters such as temperature and precipitation. Extreme events seem to have increased as well such as heat waves, droughts, tsunamis, storm surges, and typhoons. An increased frequency and prolonged duration of such natural disasters are likely to impact upon the energy, agricultural and tourism sector of Japan.

==== Sea level rise ====
Global warming has led to an increase in worldwide sea level rise due to the melting to glaciers and ice sheets.

Southern and eastern coastal parts of Japan, have a high probability to be affected by phenomena such as tsunamis and storms.

=== Water resources ===
Water resources are highly dependent on the country's rates of precipitation and evapotranspiration. Temperature projections in Japan are increasingly affecting both water cycle processes, hurting the availability of water resources for Japan. The effect of climate change upon water availability in Japan includes:

- Less snow and ice coverage eventually will mean an increase in droughts. Japan is a country that has experienced droughts before. In areas depending on the snow melting for water availability, a decrease in river discharges is expected.
- Runoffs which are expected based on low and medium emission scenarios to be increased, causing soil erosion, transport of pollutants, and flood risks.
- Alteration in groundwater storage, affects its infrastructure, causing contamination, and even increasing salination due to sea level rise.

A decrease in water resources could potentially cause problems for Japanese sectors like agriculture which will have to find different cultivation methods to manage water waste, especially in the scenario of severe droughts.

=== Ecosystems ===
Changes in temperature, precipitation patterns and sea level rise are some potential effects of climate change, which are leading to changes in the distribution and abundance of plant and animal species. Listed below, are ecosystems that will potentially get affected by climate change in Japan:

- Changes in species distribution: As temperatures increase, species are shifting their ranges to higher latitudes or elevations in search of cooler conditions. This can disrupt the balance of ecosystems and lead to the loss of species that are unable to adapt.
- Changes in phenology: Climate change is causing shifts in the timing of seasonal events such as flowering, migration, and hibernation. These changes can affect the timing of interactions between species, such as pollination or predator-prey relationships.
- Changes in forest ecosystems: Climate change is leading to changes in the growth, productivity, and composition of forests in Japan, depending on the tree species. For example, primeval forest ecosystems are already affected because of climate change. Changes in temperature and precipitation patterns can affect the timing and intensity of forest fires which eventually could lead to a loss of biodiversity and an increase in emissions.
- Impacts on marine ecosystems: Rising sea temperatures and ocean acidification are affecting marine ecosystems in Japan, leading to changes in the distribution and abundance of species and altering food webs. This can have an impact on the fishing industry, which is an important source of livelihood for Japanese communities.

Overall, climate change is having significant impacts on Japan's ecosystems, and these impacts are likely to continue and even accelerate in the future. Japan must take steps to mitigate and adapt to these impacts to protect its biodiversity and the services that ecosystems provide.

=== Biodiversity ===
Japan is a biodiverse region with over 90,000 recognized species, of which more than 30% of amphibians, reptiles, and freshwater and marine species, and more than 20% of mammals and plants are threatened with extinction. Ecological changes are increasingly reported, and climate change is recognized as a major threat to biodiversity. Phenological and distributional records show that ecological changes are occurring in response to climate change in Japan.

On average, the phenology of numerous animal species has been delayed, leading to shifts in species interactions. Rapid range expansions have been observed for insects and corals, while future projections indicate rapid shifts of plants toward higher elevations and significant losses of climatically suitable areas for high-altitude species. The impacts of climate change on Japanese species are not always consistent with the observations and projections previously reported in other regions. There is a need for further investigations in other less-known regions to improve understanding of regional impacts, which can be facilitated by utilizing locally available data and publications, especially in non-English speaking countries.

=== Coral reefs ===
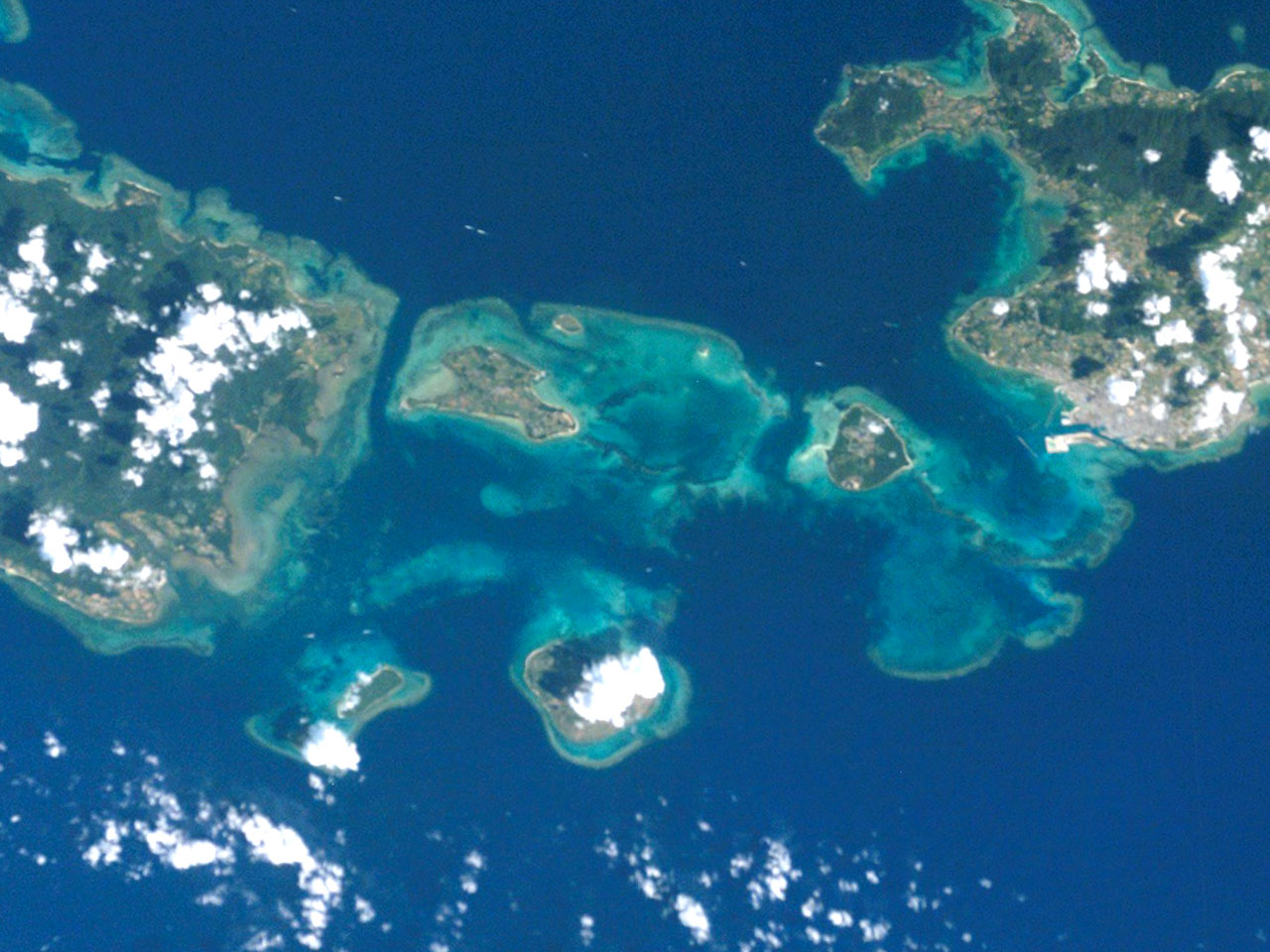
Sekisei Lagoon in Okinawa has suffered coral bleaching.

The warming of the world's oceans over the past few decades has had a significant impact on coastal ecosystems, particularly on coral reefs found in tropical and subtropical regions. The potential future outcome of global warming in Sekisei Lagoon could lead to extreme heating and mass bleaching, which would have synergistic effects with local stressors.

In 2015–2016, coral bleaching occurred on a large scale due to elevated sea temperatures, and the Ryukyu Islands' coral reefs experienced extreme thermal stress and extensive bleaching in the summer of 2016. This bleaching affected about 90% of the coral in Sekisei Lagoon. Analysis indicated that the decline in corallivores and herbivores' density matched the decrease in coral cover after mass bleaching, while changes in species richness were not correlated with coral cover change. Short-term declines in corallivores were common in the Great Barrier Reef after the 2016 mass bleaching, and at Ishigaki Island and other sites during the 1998 bleaching event. The response of herbivores varied from place to place. All potential stocks, including fisheries production, aquarium fish production, recreational diving, and seaweed control by herbivores, decreased following the bleaching. In January 2017 the Japanese environment ministry said that 70% of the Sekisei lagoon in Okinawa, Japan's biggest coral reef, had been killed by coral bleaching.

These findings suggest that severe bleaching and extreme heating were the main causes of the loss of fish diversity and associated potential stocks of ecosystem services in Sekisei Lagoon.

== Impacts on people ==
Climate change is expected to have an impact on various sectors of Japan's population. In the economic sector, it will affect agriculture, urbanization, and energy, while in the health sector, it will affect people in terms of mortality and increased exposure to heatwaves, among other impacts

=== Agriculture ===
Changing climatic conditions, with increasing temperature trends, decreasing rainfall and intensifying heat waves, droughts and other external phenomena, affect food production. These conditions tend to decrease crop yields and quality. Responses to the increase in temperature may be directed to the displacement of crop zones to higher elevations where ideal climatic conditions for growth can be found. With the increase in temperature, there may be changes in the length of the vegetative period and the early appearance of phenological phases.

Studies have shown that climate change is already having a significant impact on rice agriculture with the increase of extreme events such as heat or dry spells. These changes represent a serious concern for growers and may become a source of the vulnerability of the crop production system and pose a threat to national food security. It has been shown that there is a direct relationship between rice production and temperature, when the degree of climate change is large, production decreases. Yield reductions have been reported in specific areas or in extremely hot years.

Irrigation demand could be increased by higher temperatures due to higher plant evapotranspiration. The expansion of irrigated areas could become a threat to water resources, in terms of quantity and quality, if demand and cereal production increase.

=== Urbanization ===
Japan is one of the most urbanized countries in the world, with 91.8% of its population concentrated in urban areas by 2020. This trend will continue and increase. By 2050 the urbanization rate is expected to be almost 95%.

The elderly are especially vulnerable to the impacts of heat waves and according to data from the Euro-Mediterranean Center on Climate Change, by 2035, approximately 38% of the population will be over the age of 65. High levels of air pollution have been found to increase the effects of urban heat. In 2017, nearly 77% of the total population was exposed to air pollution levels above WHO thresholds.

=== Coastal flooding ===
According to the Euro-Mediterranean Center on Climate Change, due to its geography, high rates of soil sealing and dense urbanization along the Japanese coastline, the country is vulnerable to extreme rainfall and coastal flooding, particularly on the more populated island of Honshu. Japan is subject to the regular arrival of typhoons.

In 2018, torrential rains caused flash floods and landslides, resulting in more than 200 deaths the evacuation of 2.3 million people and more than US$7 billion in damages. The Euro-Mediterranean Center on Climate Change refers, that rising sea levels, wave heights and the frequency of typhoons are expected to increase damage to human settlements. The risk of flooding will increase in the future, with the depth of flooding in Tokyo increasing by 170% by 2050. This would result in damages to real estate and infrastructure of 220% to 240%.

=== Energy ===
According to the Euro-Mediterranean Center on Climate Change, the Japanese energy system has been significantly impacted by severe flooding resulting from heavy precipitation and typhoons. In September and October 2020, the Faxai and Hagibis typhoons caused power outages that affected 10 million households in Japan. Due to the faster-than-global-average temperature increases and the rising frequency of heat waves, the demand for cooling has been increasing in the country.

The trend for heating needs is somewhat opposite to that of cooling needs. There will be significant decreases in heating needs across the country, with the largest decrease in Hokkaido and a moderate decrease in the southern islands. On the other hand, cooling needs will increase considerably in the southern islands of Shikoku and Kyushu, while only a slight increase is expected in Hokkaido and elevated areas of Honshu.

=== Health ===
The climate and weather patterns in Japan have undergone changes that have led to an increase in mean temperature. As a result, vulnerable populations such as the elderly are at high risk due to the intensity of heat waves and heat stress. The rise in temperatures is anticipated to enable the transmission of diseases throughout Japan, including vector-borne illnesses like dengue, which tend to thrive in warmer climates.

=== Heatwaves and heat stress ===
Mortality and morbidity would increase in the country and may even double in eastern and northern Japan due to higher average temperatures and an increase in the frequency and duration of heat waves.

Japan is experiencing an increasing trend in deaths from heat-related illnesses. Between 1968 and 1994, 2,326 deaths from heat stroke were recorded, 589 of them in 1994 alone, when a severe heat wave caused temperatures to exceed 38 °C. In the abnormally hot summer of 2018, there were 95,137 emergency patients with heat stroke symptoms of which 160 died, 50% were over 65 years of age. That trend could continue to increase in the absence of adaptation measures to address climate change.

=== Labor ===
The impact of global warming is twofold as it affects both labor supply and productivity. As climate change progresses, a reduction in both labor supply and productivity is expected to occur in most regions of the world, particularly in tropical areas. According to the study by Dasgupta et al. (2021), under a 3.0 °C warming scenario, it is projected that future climate change will lead to a reduction of 18 percentage points in global total labor for low-exposure sectors and a reduction of 24.8 percentage points for high-exposure sectors. In Japan, under a low emissions scenario, the total labor force is estimated to decrease by 0.88%, whereas, under a medium emissions scenario, it is expected to decline by 2.2%.

=== Disease ===
The effects of climate change are expected to widen the geographic range and environmental conditions suitable for various vector-borne infectious diseases, including dengue. The likelihood of dengue transmission is amplified by rising temperatures, as the development and proliferation of mosquitoes are substantially impacted by factors such as temperature, precipitation, and humidity. The risks associated with transmission suitability due to climate change have intensified over time, and if the planet continues to warm, more than 1.3 billion individuals could face temperatures conducive to Zika transmission by the year 2050.

The dengue outbreak that occurred in Japan in 2014 suggests that the environmental conditions necessary for its transmission may be increasing. The Asian tiger mosquito, which has adapted well to urban environments, is a significant factor in these changing dynamics. According to the CMCC (2022), if emissions continue at a moderate level, 84.7% of the population could face transmission-suitable mean temperatures for dengue by 2050, and under a high emissions scenario, 81.8% could be at risk. In the case of Zika, 80.7% of the population could be at risk by 2050 under a medium emissions scenario, while 82.7% could be at risk under a high emissions scenario.

Japan was previously affected by malaria, and although it is no longer considered endemic, the mosquitoes responsible for its transmission still exist. According to projections, by 2050, 40.4% of the Japanese population could be at risk of malaria under a low-emissions scenario, while 42.5% could be at risk under a high-emissions scenario.

Research suggests that a general rise of 10 μg/m3 in daily PM2.5 concentrations in Japan is linked to a 1.3% increase in total non-accidental mortality. Projections indicate that by 2060, there could be 779 deaths per year per million people in Japan due to outdoor air pollution, which is an increase from 468 deaths in 2010.

== Mitigation and adaptation ==
=== Adaptation ===
In terms of adaptation measures for agriculture and water resources, efforts should focus on the management and renovation of irrigation facilities, as well as anticipating the transplanting of crops in the hottest periods and developing crop varieties resistant to projected increases in temperatures.

In terms of adaptation measures for mortality and morbidity due to higher average temperatures and the increase in the frequency and duration of heat waves, different studies have suggested that lifestyle changes such as the widespread use of air conditioners may represent an important adaptation to the risk of heat stress emergencies.

Japan adopted its National Plan for Adaptation to the Impacts of Climate Change in 2015, which contains specific measures for various sectors such as Agriculture, Forestry, and Fisheries, Water Resources, Natural Ecosystems, Natural Disasters and Coastal Areas, Human Health, Industrial and Economic Activity, as well as the Life of Citizenry and Urban Life.

=== Energy transition ===
In terms of energy, in 2020, Japan made a commitment to achieve full decarbonization by 2050, but it is still dedicated to reducing emissions by 26% by 2030. As a result, fossil fuels will continue to be relevant and potentially vulnerable for the next few years, while carbon-free sources such as renewables and residual nuclear energy are expected to become more dominant and potentially face their own vulnerabilities in the second half of the century.

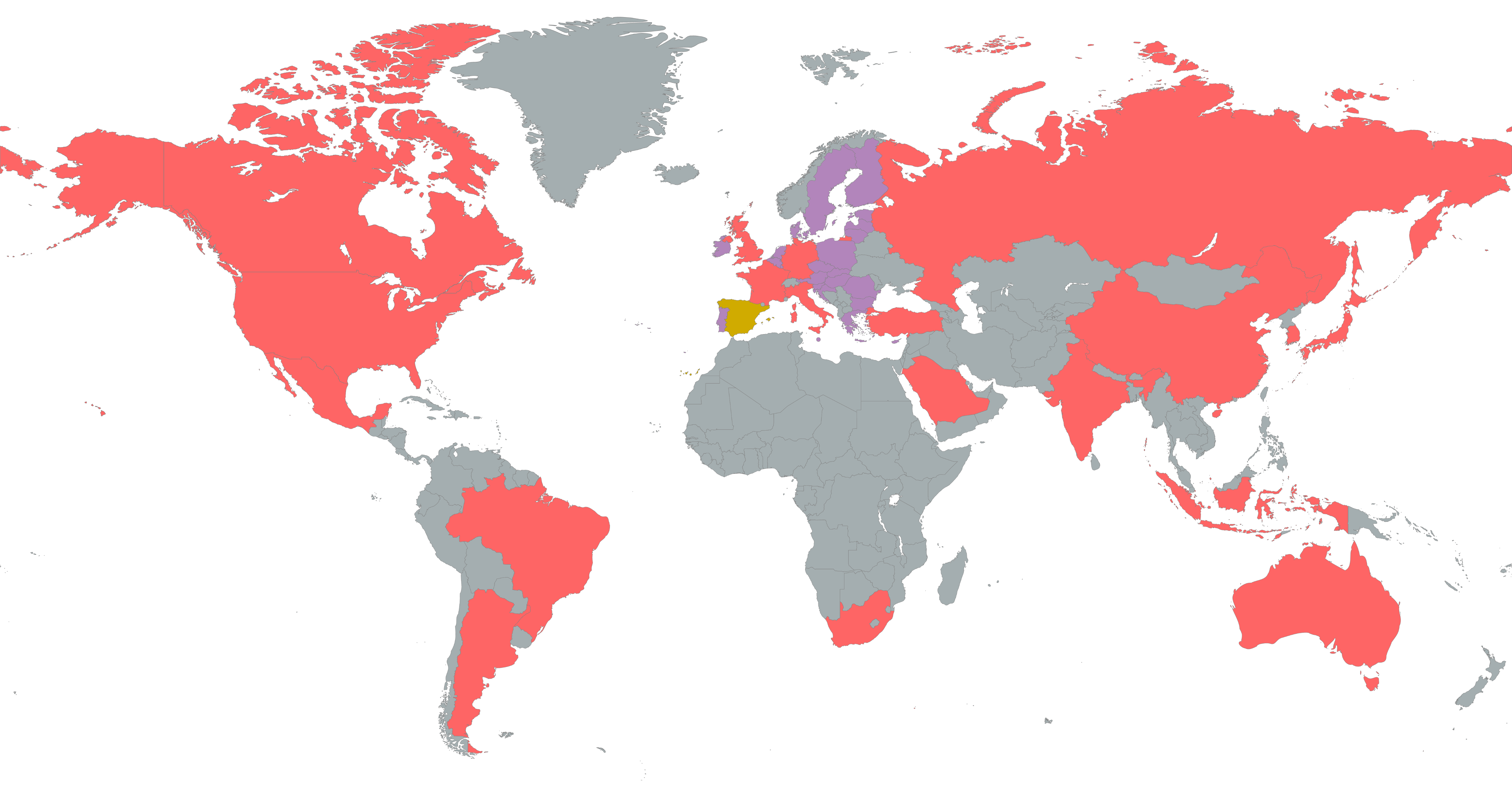
G20 Countries members in map

Japan's overall performance in the Energy Transition indicator is in line with the G20 country average. The country has shown high performance in the Efficiency and Electrification domains, which has been driving the transformation of the energy sector. There is still room for improvement in terms of increasing the installed capacity of renewables and reducing the use of fossil fuels. By making progress in these areas, Japan could also decrease the level of urban air pollution and reduce CO_{2} emissions per capita, leading to further improvements in the emissions indicator.

Japan's 2030 greenhouse gas emissions reduction targets by sector
Sector	2030	2013	Reduction 2013-30
Energy originated CO_{2} (in Mt CO_{2})	927	1,235	-25%
Industry	401	429	-7%
Commercial	168	279	-40%
Residential	122	201	-39%
Transport	163	225	-28%
Energy conversion	73	101	-30%
Non-energy originated greenhouse gases (in Mt CO_{2}-eq)	152	173	-12%
Land use, land-use change, and forestry (in Mt CO_{2}-eq)	-37	-	-

Building upon its existing environmental initiatives, Japan is considering a revised climate target aimed at further reducing its greenhouse gas emissions. The government plans to achieve a reduction of 66% in emissions from 2013 levels by the fiscal year 2035. This ambitious target is part of a comprehensive strategy intended to adjust the country's energy mix by 2040, designed to provide businesses with a predictable framework for future investment and to ensure compliance with international environmental standards set by the Paris Agreement. The intermediate target for 2030 has been established at a 46% reduction in emissions. Additionally, the strategy includes a significant enhancement of nuclear power's role in the national energy portfolio, aiming to increase its share from less than 10% currently to up to 22%. This shift is seen as a key component in accelerating Japan's transition towards more sustainable energy sources.

In the light of Japan's climate targets, its energy sector has experienced significant expansion in renewable energy capacity, growing by over 30% in the past five years and driving demand for battery energy storage systems (BESS). More than half of the 2.4 gigawatts of capacity awarded in recent long-term low-carbon power auctions was thereby allocated to foreign companies or consortia. Major projects approved for 2024 include over 1.37 GW of new BESS capacity and more than 6.7 GWh of energy capacity. Japan's Long Term Decarbonization Power Source Auction incentivizes BESS deployment by guaranteeing fixed cost recovery for 20 years. However, limited price volatility and a market price floor may constrain returns for BESS operators, highlighting the need for further reform.

=== Policies and legislation ===
As a member in the Paris Agreement, Japan was the first nation to release a new national climate plan by 2020 as required in the 2015 agreement. However, this new plan included no major changes from the 2013 national climate plan, which aimed to reduce emissions by 26% from 2013 rates. This lack of aggressive action as the fifth largest polluter in the world led the World Resources Institute to describe the plan as "putting the world on a more dangerous trajectory." Similarly, the head of the World Wildlife Fund Japan climate and energy group, Naoyuki Yamagishi, described the plan as "completely the wrong signal."

In 2018, Japan established its Strategic Energy Plan, with goals set for 2030. The plan aimed to reduce coal use from 32 to 26 percent, to increase renewables from 17 to 22–24 percent, and to increase nuclear from 6 to 20–22 percent of the energy production mix. As part of this goal, Japan announced a goal of shutting down 100 old, low-efficiency coal-fired plants out of its 140 coal fired power plants. As of 2020, 114 of Japan's 140 coal-fired plants are deemed old and inefficient. Twenty-six are considered high-efficiency, and 16 new high-efficiency plants are currently under construction. Funding of overseas coal power ended in 2021. The Japanese government said that they would try to be carbon neutral as soon as possible in the second half of the century. The official goal of the Japanese government is to be net zero in 2050.

The Cool Biz campaign introduced under former Prime Minister of Japan Junichiro Koizumi was targeted at reducing energy use through the reduction of air conditioning use in government offices.

=== Carbon price ===
Since 2012 the country has levied a "Tax for Climate Change Mitigation" on petroleum, coal and natural gas at ¥289 (US$2.63) per nominal tonne of carbon they emit when burned. In addition, Tokyo has had a local carbon emissions trading system since 2010 in which carbon permits are valued at approximately US$50.

In December 2009, nine industry groupings opposed a carbon tax at the opening day of the COP-15 Copenhagen climate conference stating, "Japan should not consider a carbon tax as it would damage the economy which is already among the world's most energy-efficient." The industry groupings represented the oil, cement, paper, chemical, gas, electric power, auto manufacturing and electronics, and information technology sectors.

Japan launched a carbon credit market on Oct. 11, 2023, with a carbon levy expected in 2028.

=== Municipality level ===
Local governments, both prefectures and municipalities, are responsible for creating their own climate change adaptation plans under the Climate Change Adaptation Act, which came into force in December 2018. They are also tasked with creating Local Climate Change Adaptation Centers to study climate change adaptation, which can be established in partnership with research institutes, universities, or other appropriate local institutions. By 2021, 22 of the 47 prefectures and 30 of the 1,741 municipalities had established plans, while 23 prefectures and 2 municipalities had established research centers. While local governments can create joint plans and centers under the legislation, by 2021 none had done so.

Japan's capital Tokyo is preparing to force industry to make big cuts in greenhouse gases, taking the lead in a country struggling to meet its Kyoto Protocol obligations. Tokyo's outspoken governor, Shintaro Ishihara, decided to go it alone and create Japan's first emissions cap system, reducing greenhouse gas emission by a total of 25% by 2020 from the 2000 level.

=== International cooperation ===
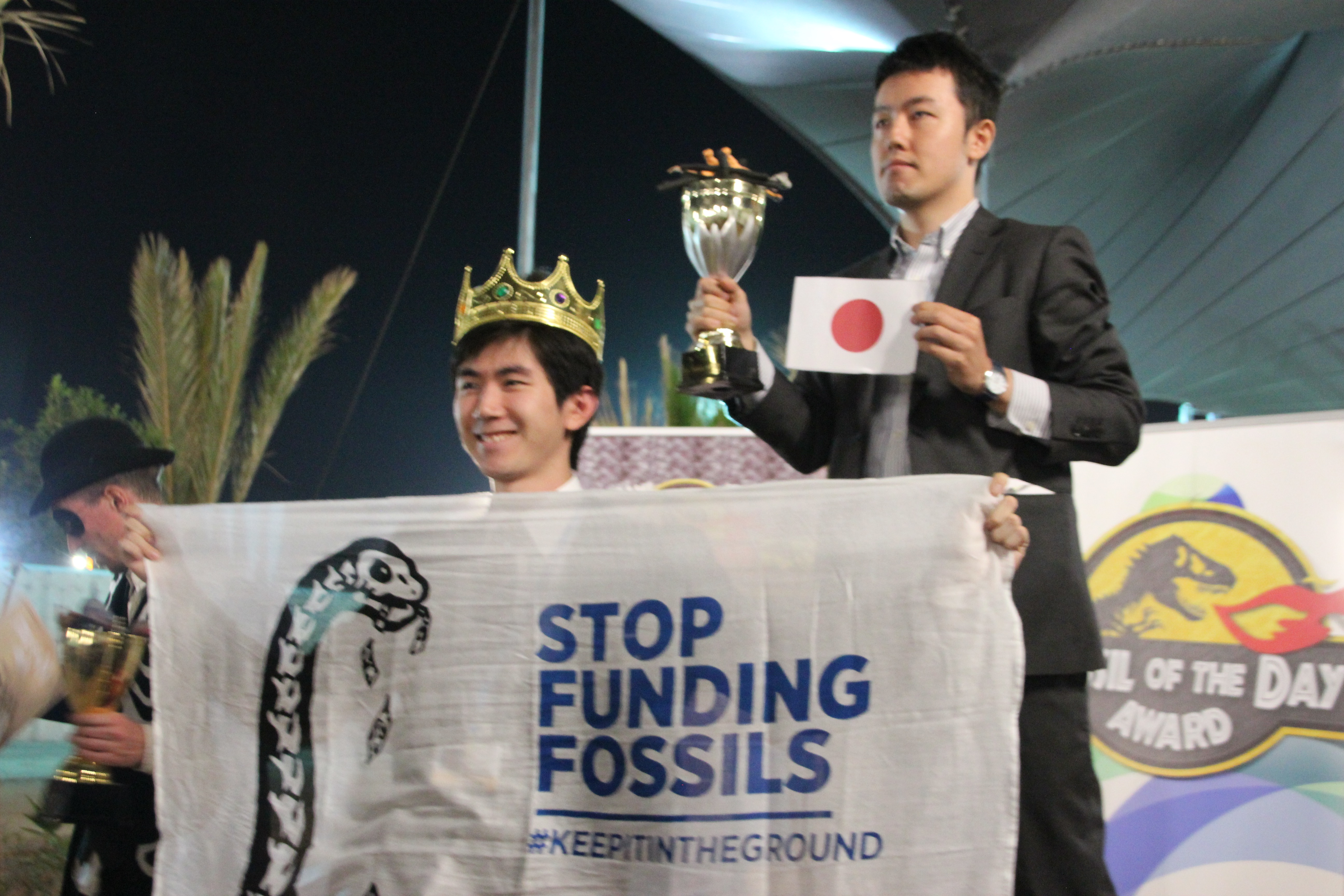
Protesters opposing Japan's climate change mitigation policies at the 2016 United Nations Climate Change Conference

Japan created the Kyoto Protocol Target Achievement Plan to lay out the necessary measures required to meet their 6% reduction commitment under the Kyoto Protocol. It was first established as an outcome of the evaluation of the Climate Change Policy Program carried out in 2004. The main branches of the plan are ensuring the pursuit of environment and economy, promoting of technology, raising public awareness, utilizing of policy measures, and ensuring international collaboration.

== See also ==
- Energy in Japan
- Cool Earth 50
- Environmental issues in Japan
- Plug-in electric vehicles in Japan
