= The Windsor Hotel Toya Resort & Spa =

Resort hotel in Tōyako, Japan

The Windsor Hotel TOYA Resort & Spa
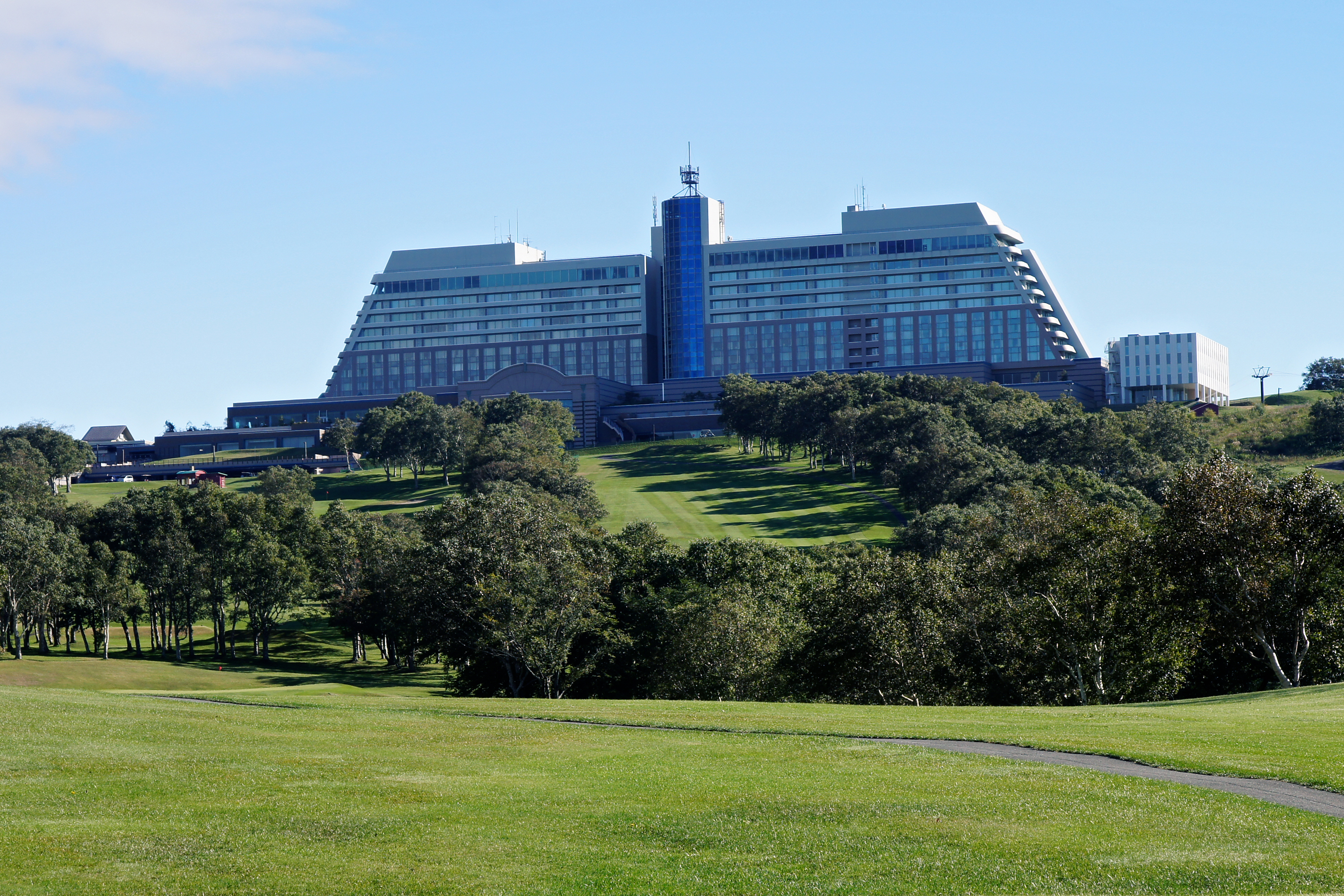
- The hotel in 2013
- Interactive map of the The Windsor Hotel TOYA Resort & Spa area

General information
- Location: Tōyako, Abuta, Hokkaidō, Japan
- Coordinates: 42°35′33.39″N 140°45′32.50″E
- Opening: December, 1993 (as Hotel Apex Tōya)
- Owner: Meiji Shipping
- Operator: The Windsor Hotels International

Other information
- Number of rooms: 398
- Number of suites: 134
- Number of restaurants: 13
- Parking: 347

Website
- www.windsor-hotels.co.jp

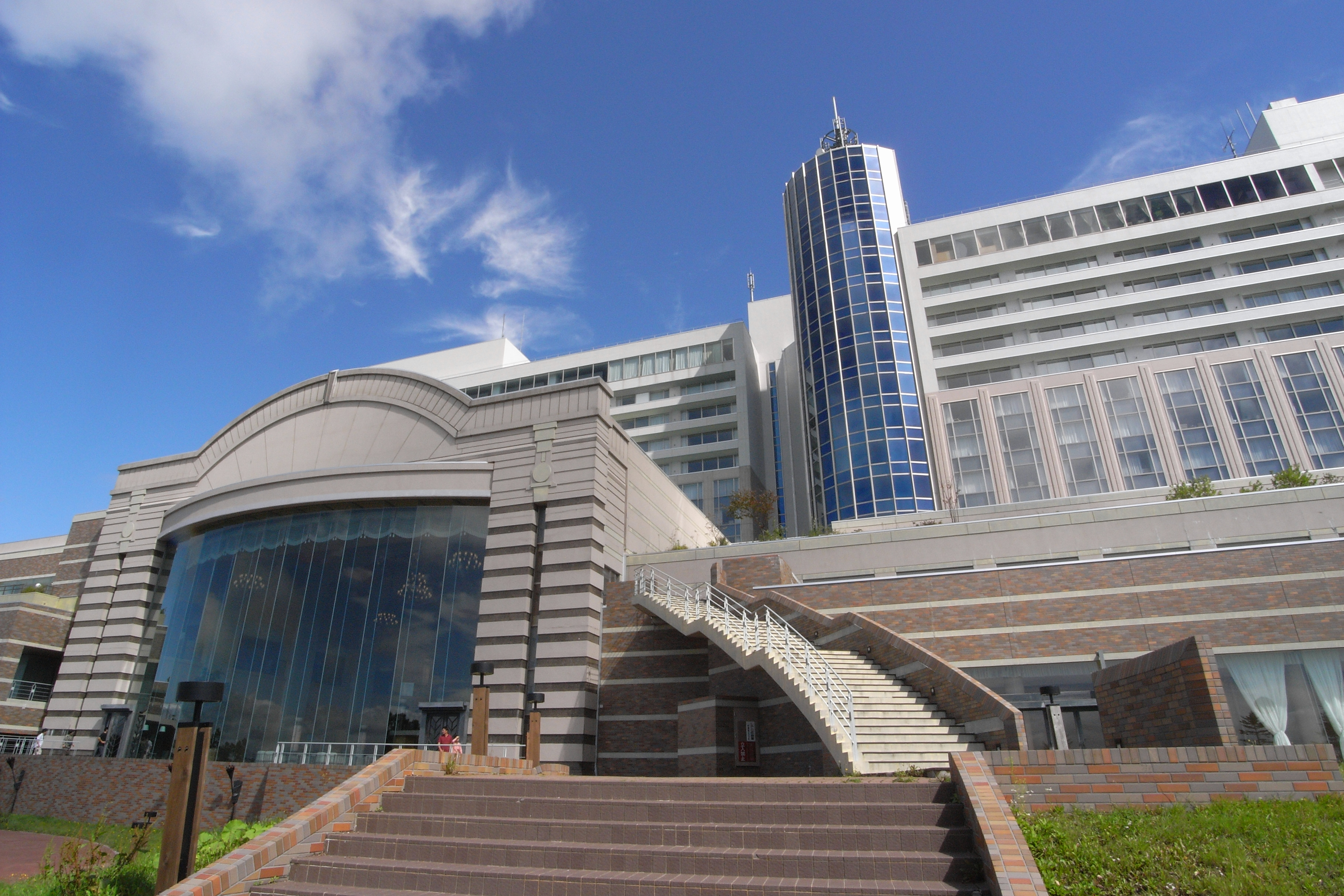
The hotel entrance.

The Windsor Hotel TOYA Resort & Spa (ザ・ウィンザーホテル洞爺リゾート&スパ, Za Winzā Hoteru Tōya Rizōto ando Supa) is a resort hotel located in Tōyako, Abuta, Hokkaidō, Japan. Managed by The Windsor Hotels International, it was the main conference site of the 34th G8 summit, the fifth G8 summit to take place in Japan.

== History ==
The Hotel Apex Tōya opened in December, 1993. To manage the hotel, the Windsor Hotels International was established in July 1997, and the hotel was renamed the Windsor Hotel Tōya.

The Hokkaido Takushoku Bank, which had financed the hotel, went bankrupt in November 1997, and the management of the hotel was discontinued for lack of funds. In 2000, Tokachi Urban Properties, a local real-estate company, purchased the land and building of the hotel, and extensive renovation of the building was done during the following year.

After the building was redone, the hotel was opened as The Windsor Hotel TOYA Resort & Spa on June 1, 2002. In the same year, the hotel joined the Leading Hotels of the World, and the Windsor Hospitality Institute, a school for hotel clerks, was established. Secom, a security company, owned the hotel until 2014, when they sold it to Meiji Shipping, a Japanese shipping company.

The hotel joined the Vignette Collection division of IHG Hotels & Resorts on November 28, 2024.

== See also ==
- List of G8 summit resorts
