= 34th G8 summit =

2008 international leader meeting in Japan

34th G8 Summit Hokkaido-Toyako Summit

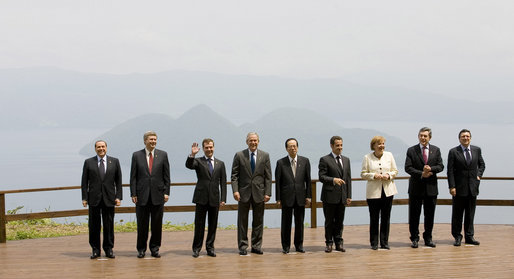
- Host country: Japan
- Dates: July 7–9, 2008
- Cities: Tōyako
- Venues: Windsor Hotel Toya Resort & Spa
- Follows: 33rd G8 summit
- Precedes: 35th G8 summit

The 34th G8 summit was held in the town of Tōyako, Hokkaido, Japan, on July 7–9, 2008. The locations of previous summits hosted by Japan include Tokyo (1979, 1986, 1993) and Nago, Okinawa (2000). The G8 summit has evolved beyond being a gathering of world political leaders to become an occasion for a wide variety of non-governmental organizations, activists and civic groups to congregate and discuss a multitude of issues.

== Overview ==
The Group of Seven (G7) was an unofficial forum which brought together the heads of the richest industrialized countries: France, Germany, Italy, Japan, the United Kingdom, the United States, and Canada starting in 1976. The Group of Eight (G8), meeting for the first time in 1997, was formed with the addition of Russia. In addition, the President of the European Commission has been formally included in summits since 1981. The summits were not meant to be linked formally with wider international institutions; and in fact, a mild rebellion against the stiff formality of other international meetings was a part of the genesis of cooperation between France's president Valéry Giscard d'Estaing and West Germany's chancellor Helmut Schmidt as they conceived the initial summit of the Group of Six (G6) in 1975.

In discussions regarding Africa during the 34th G8 summit, the G8 leaders set a five-year deadline to commit US$60 billion in funding to help fight disease in Africa and renewed a commitment made three years earlier to double aid for Africa to $25-billion by 2010 and to consider pledging further assistance after 2010. On the topic of global warming, the G8 leaders agreed on the need for the world to cut carbon emissions blamed for global warming by at least 50 percent by 2050. Environmental activists and leaders from the developing countries described the statement as a "toothless gesture". Results of discussions on the Anti-Counterfeiting Trade Agreement were not known. The G8 leaders made statements regarding their relations with Zimbabwe, Iran and, North Korea. The responses of the G8 leaders to the "Challenge to the G8 Governments" of over 100 NGOs and other organisations and individuals requesting them to "cancel all illegitimate debt", to "end the practice of using loans and debt cancellation to impose conditionalities" and to "facilitate the return of stolen assets kept in the banks in the G8 countries" are not presently known. Regarding the 2007–2008 world food price crisis, the differences between the G8 leaders and the citizens' groups' approaches to solving the crisis appeared unresolved. The G8's communiqué said that it was "imperative" to remove export restrictions, in contrast to requests of the signers of the "Challenge to the G8 Governments".

The G8 summits during the 21st-century have also involved widespread parallel debates and protests by citizens and claimed human rights violations against some of them during massive police/military operations. Over 40 dissidents were arrested before the summit started and nineteen or twenty Koreans critical of the G8 leadership were detained at New Chitose Airport for at least 24 hours. During a "non-violent demonstration where no acts against property or people took place" according to a legal observer, at least four people were arrested, including a Reuters cameraman. At this venue, amongst the reasons cited for demonstrations and protests were that a G8 summit is merely an arbitrary meeting of national leaders and that it is also a nexus which becomes more than the sum of its parts, elevating the participants, the event and the venue as focal points for activist pressure.

== Leaders at the summit ==
The G8 is an unofficial annual forum for the leaders of Canada, the European Commission, France, Germany, Italy, Japan, Russia, the United Kingdom, and the United States.

The 34th G8 summit was the first summit for British Prime Minister Gordon Brown and Russian President Dmitry Medvedev, and was the last summit for US President George W. Bush. It was also the first and only summit for Japanese Prime Minister Yasuo Fukuda. Fukuda resigned as Japan's Prime Minister on September 1, and he being the first of the G8 leaders at the summit to leave office.

French President Nicolas Sarkozy observed, "I think it is not reasonable to continue to meet as eight to solve the big questions of the world, forgetting China -- one billion 300 million people -- and not inviting India -- one billion people." Japan and the United States announced opposition to Sarkozy's implied suggestion.

=== Participants ===
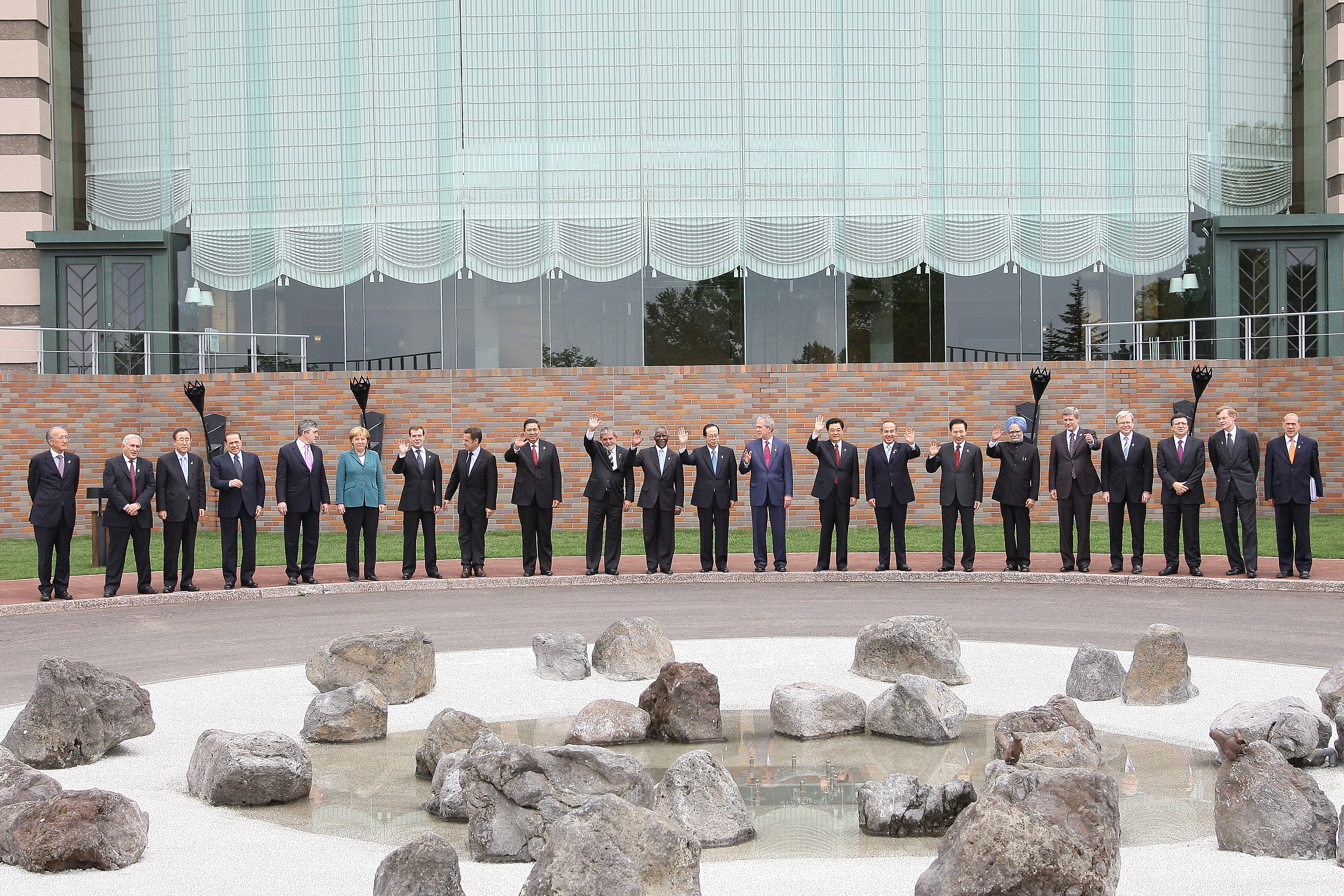
Family photo of the G8+G5

These summit participants are the current "core members" of the international forum:

**Core G8 members** Host state and leader are shown in bold text.
Member		Represented by	Title
(Canada)	Canada	Stephen Harper	Prime Minister
(France)	France	Nicolas Sarkozy	President
(Germany)	Germany	Angela Merkel	Chancellor
(Italy)	Italy	Silvio Berlusconi	Prime Minister
(Japan)	**Japan**	**Yasuo Fukuda**	**Prime Minister**
(Russia)	Russia	Dmitry Medvedev	President
(United Kingdom)	United Kingdom	Gordon Brown	Prime Minister
(United States)	United States	George W. Bush	President
(European Union)	European Union	José Manuel Barroso	Commission President
(European Union)	European Union	Nicolas Sarkozy	Council President
**G8+5 Invitees (Countries)**
Member		Represented by	Title
(Brazil)	Brazil	Luiz Inácio Lula da Silva	President
(China)	China	Hu Jintao	General Secretary; President
(India)	India	Manmohan Singh	Prime Minister
(Mexico)	Mexico	Felipe Calderón	President
(South Africa)	South Africa	Thabo Mbeki	President
**Limited Guest Invitees (Countries)**
Member		Represented by	Title
(Algeria)	Algeria	Abdelaziz Bouteflika	President
(Australia)	Australia	Kevin Rudd	Prime Minister
(Ethiopia)	Ethiopia	Meles Zenawi	Prime Minister
(Ghana)	Ghana	John Kufuor	President
(Indonesia)	Indonesia	Susilo Bambang Yudhoyono	President
(Nigeria)	Nigeria	Umaru Musa Yar'Adua	President
(Senegal)	Senegal	Abdoulaye Wade	President
(South Korea)	South Korea	Lee Myung-bak	President
(Tanzania)	Tanzania	Jakaya Kikwete	President
**Guest Invitees (International Institutions)**
Member		Represented by	Title
	African Union	Jean Ping	Commission Chairman
	African Union	Jakaya Kikwete	Chairperson
(Commonwealth of Independent States)	Commonwealth of Independent States	Sergey Lebedev	Executive Secretary
(International Atomic Energy Agency)	International Atomic Energy Agency	Mohamed ElBaradei	Director General
	International Energy Agency	Nobuo Tanaka	Executive Director
(United Nations)	United Nations	Ban Ki-moon	Secretary-General
(UNESCO)	UNESCO	Kōichirō Matsuura	Director-General
	World Bank	Robert Zoellick	President
(World Health Organization)	World Health Organization	Margaret Chan	Director-General
	World Trade Organization	Pascal Lamy	Director-General

== Priorities ==
Traditionally, the host country of the G8 summit sets the agenda for negotiations, which take place primarily amongst multi-national civil servants in the weeks before the summit itself, leading to a joint declaration which all countries can agree to sign. This year, leaders of the G8 hoped to find common ground on climate change, the global economy, and a host of political crises.

== Issues ==
The summit was intended as a venue for resolving differences among its members. As a practical matter, the summit was also conceived as an opportunity for its members to give each other mutual encouragement in the face of difficult economic decisions.

=== Africa ===
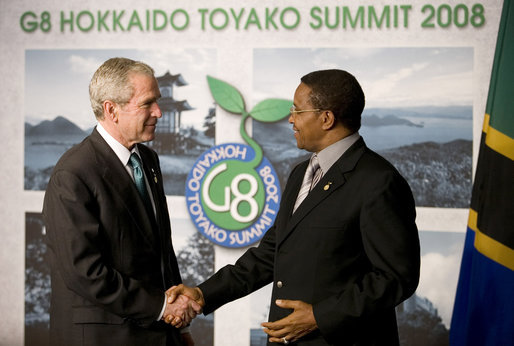
US President George W. Bush meeting Tanzanian President Jakaya Kikwete

The G8 leaders were in a position to discuss the "full range of issues relating to African development". The need to address long-term planning for African development has been a G8 agenda item for a number of years. In 2008, Japan hosted both the G8 summit and the Fourth Tokyo International Conference on African Development (TICAD-IV) -— a pentannual (recurring in five-year cycles) meeting for African leaders and their development partners. This meant that Japan had the opportunity to help Africa into the spotlight of international attention. Africa, which has been on the G8 agenda since 2000 when Japan last chaired the G8, has continued to lag behind on progress towards meeting Millennium Development Goals (MDGs) while Asia has made considerable strides during the same period. Unanswered questions remain about why what has happened in Asia has not happened in Africa.

After discussions, the G8 leaders announced new measures on improving education, health, water supplies and sanitation and increasing the number of doctors and nurses in Africa. However, the Times says that it will be by the presence, or absence, of a headline figure on overall African aid that their talks will be judged a success or failure. Fukuda and Brown are reported to be pressing for the fulfillment of pledges made at the 2005 Gleneagles summit, but Sarkozy and Berlusconi are seen to be for pulling back from those commitments.

The G8 leaders set a five-year deadline to commit $60-billion in funding to help Africa fight disease, including pledging 100 million mosquito nets by 2010 which will prevent thousands of deaths from malaria. They also renewed a commitment made three years ago to double aid for Africa to $25-billion by 2010 and to consider pledging further assistance after 2010.

=== Climate change ===
The G8 leaders claimed that they would discuss the "full range of issues relating to climate".

A package of proposals has been developed for further discussion including "a new framework that will ensure participation by the United States and China, the world's largest greenhouse-gas emitters." The G8 conference is claimed by G8 organisers to be "an important platform to firm up commitments" based on the initial framework agreed upon at the December 2007 United Nations Climate Change Conference held in Bali, Indonesia.

In the "Challenge to the G8 Governments" by over 100 NGOs and other organisations and individuals, critics of the G8 claimed that the G8 states are themselves responsible for the climate crisis. They called for the G8 governments to "stop financing projects and policies that contribute to climate change".

G8 leaders agreed on the need for the world to cut carbon emissions blamed for global warming by at least 50 percent by 2050 and for each nation to set its own target for near term goals. The communiqué represents a small step forward from last year's call to "consider seriously" such long-term cuts; but environmental activists and leaders from the developing countries were disappointed, describing the statement as a toothless gesture.

The impact of climate change on small Pacific Island nations will also be an "unofficial theme" of the G8 summit, according to a report by the Asahi Evening News. Japan had unveiled a plan called the Cool Earth Partnership in June 2008 in order to help small Pacific states and other developing nations cope with the challenges of climate change. An official for the Japanese Ministry of the Environment stated that it wanted to unveil the new aid package before the G8 Summit in order to further dialogue on the subject. Tavau Teii, the Deputy Prime Minister of Tuvalu, a recipient of Japan's aid package against rising sea levels, toured Japan in the run up to the G8 Summit to raise awareness on the impact of climate change on his small island country.

=== Intellectual property rights ===
A leaked document detailed the provisions of a proposed plurilateral trade agreement which would impose strict enforcement of intellectual property rights related to Internet activity and trade in information-based goods. If adopted, a treaty of this form would impose a strong, top-down enforcement regime imposing new cooperation requirements upon Internet service providers, including perfunctory disclosure of customer information, as well as measures restricting the use of online privacy tools. The proposal also specifies a plan to encourage developing nations to accept the legal regime. Talking points from the European Commission, the Office of the United States Trade Representative, the Australian Department of Foreign Affairs and Trade, and others have published selected passages ostensibly from this document.

=== Political issues ===
Amongst the important issues which were open for discussion included terrorism and nuclear non-proliferation.

- Zimbabwe: The G8 communiqué expressed "grave concern" about the violence-marred election process which superficially confirmed Robert Mugabe's continuing hold on the presidency. They warned of further action including targeted sanctions against those in Mugabe's government who were behind the violence. The leaders jointly recommended the appointment of a UN special envoy. Gordon Brown pressed for a statement which would have labeled Mugabe an illegitimate president, and George Bush described last month's violent presidential election as a "sham". However, there was no unanimity amongst the G8; and Russia quietly signaled opposition to imposing further sanctions against Mugabe's regime.
- Iran: The G8 communiqué urged the Iranian government to end its uranium enrichment program in line with UN Security Council resolutions; and they formally called on Tehran to respond positively to international mediation.
- North Korea: The G8 communiqué encouraged North Korea to abandon nuclear weapons and to cooperate in the verification of its dossier of nuclear programmes. In support for a key concern of the Japanese government, the G8 leaders also urged progress in resolving unanswered questions about North Korea's abductions of Japanese civilians in the 1970s and 1980s.

=== World economy ===
The Summit Website highlights several key issues surrounding the world economy to be discussed, including: sustained growth of the world economy, investment, trade, protection of intellectual property rights, emerging economies and natural resources.

The requests to the G8 governments expressed in the "Challenge to the G8 Governments" by over 100 NGOs and other organisations and individuals regarding the world economy were to "cancel all illegitimate debt", "end the practice of using loans and debt cancellation to impose conditionalities" and "facilitate the return of stolen assets kept in the banks in the G8 countries."

=== Food crisis ===
Regarding the 2007–2008 world food price crisis, over 100 NGOs and other organisations and individuals issued a "Challenge to the G8 Governments" which called for the G8 to "respect efforts to reverse the harmful policies that have led to the food crisis" and for the G8 to "ban speculation on food prices".

G8 leaders called on those nations with sufficient food stocks to release some of their reserves to help others cope with soaring prices; and the G8's mildly worded communiqué said it was "imperative" to remove export restrictions.

== Schedule and agenda ==
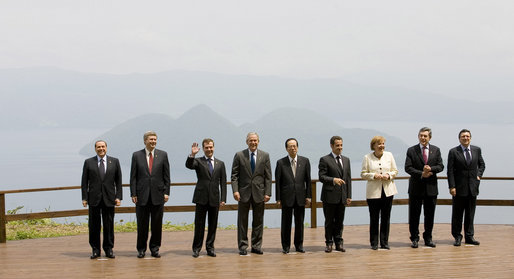
Family photo of the G8 heads of delegations

A tentative schedule for the G8 summit was arranged in advance; and contingencies affecting some surrounding events were anticipated by the summit planners.

=== July 5 ===
Saturday's agenda included the following:

- Peace Walk by activists, including anti-G8 protesters in Sapporo, Hokkaido

=== July 6 ===
Sunday's agenda included the following:

- Non-government organizations hold "People's Summit" in Sapporo, Hokkaido (to July 8)
- Bush-Fukuda bilateral meeting, US-Japan summit
- Harper-Fukuda bilateral meeting, Canada-Japan summit
- US-Japan leaders dinner

=== July 7 ===
The first official day of meetings in Tōyako focused on African development issues. The exchange of views were aired in a number of bilateral meetings and in an expanded afternoon session which brought together the G8 leaders and leaders of seven African countries -- Algeria, Ethiopia, Ghana, Nigeria, Senegal, South Africa, Tanzania, and the chairman of the African Union Commission. Monday's agenda included the following:

- Merkel-Fukuda bilateral meeting
- Medvedev-Brown bilateral meeting
- Medvedev-Merkel bilateral meeting
- Medvedev-Sarkozy bilateral meeting
- Medvedev-Bush bilateral meeting
- Outreach Working Lunch: G8 leaders + 8 African leaders
- Outreach Working Session: G8 leaders + 8 African leaders
- Mbeki-Bush bilateral meeting
- Mbeki-Fukuda bilateral meeting, South Africa–Japan summit
- Bouteflika-Sarkozy bilateral meeting
- Bouteflika-Fukuda bilateral meeting
- Yar'Adua-Fukuda bilateral meeting, Nigeria-Japan summit
- Brown-Fukuda bilateral meeting
- G8 Social Event (Tanabata-related event)
- G8 Social Dinner

=== July 8 ===
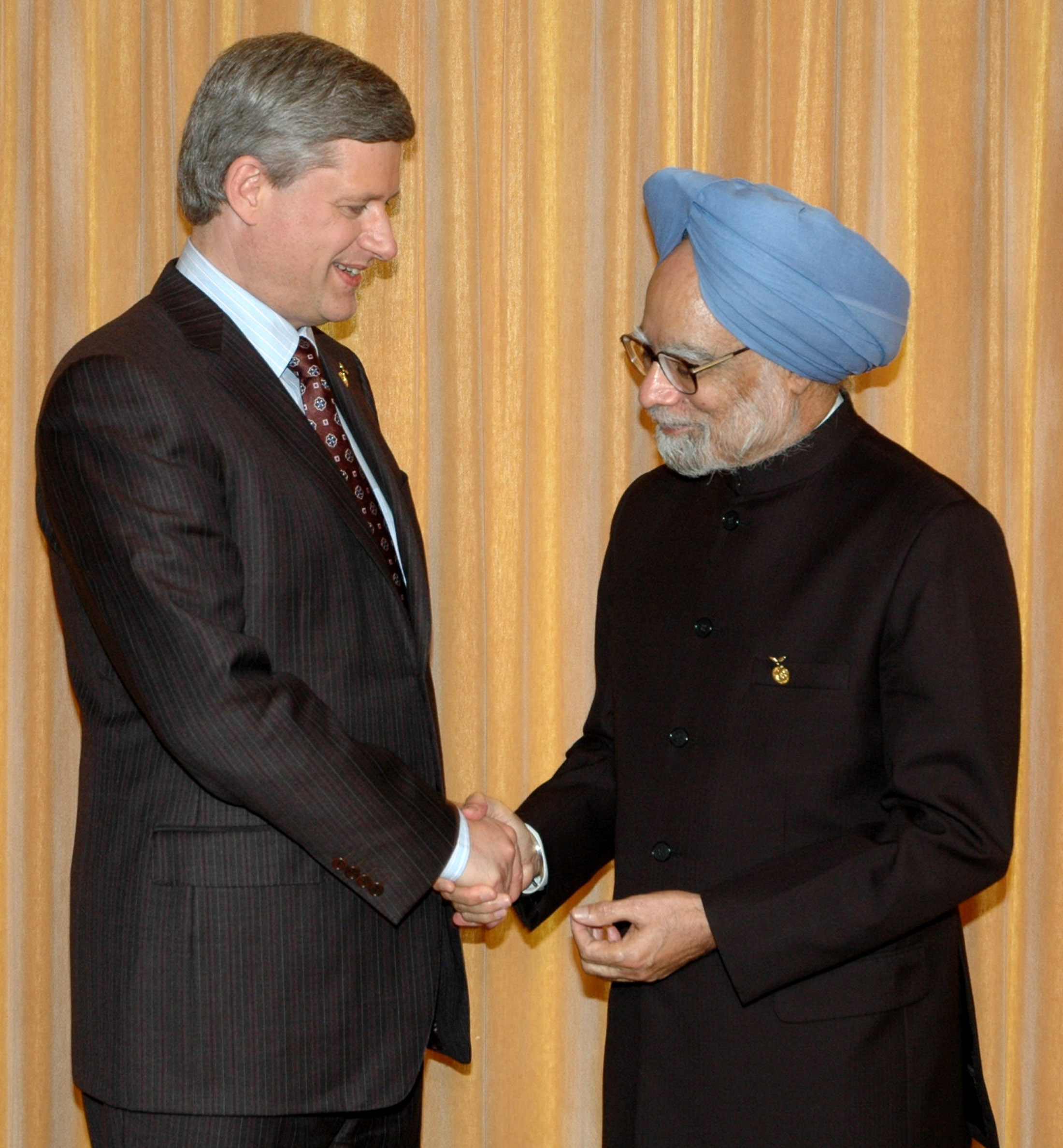
Canadian Prime Minister Stephen Harper with Indian Prime Minister Manmohan Singh

The second day of meetings in Tōyako focused on the food crisis, oil prices, and climate change. Tuesday's agenda included the following:

- Merkel-Bush bilateral meeting.
- G8 Morning Working Session
- G8 Working Lunch
- G8 Afternoon Working Session
- Meeting of the "+5" countries (G8+5) in Sapporo ahead of Wednesday' morning session (Brazil, China, India, Mexico, and South Africa)
- Medvedev-Fukuda bilateral meeting
- Berlusconi-Fukuda bilateral meeting
- G8 Working Dinner
- Hu-Lula bilateral meeting
- Hu-Mbeki bilateral meeting
- Hu-Singh bilateral meeting

=== July 9 ===
The third day of the summit was devoted to crafting summary statements to describe some of the substantive issues which were discussed by the leaders. Wednesday's schedule included two morning sessions. An outreach meeting in the early morning brought together G8 leaders and the leaders of Brazil, China, India, Mexico, South Africa. There was a separate meeting for G8 leaders and leaders of "major economies" -- Australia, Brazil, China, India, Indonesia, Mexico, South Africa, and South Korea. Wednesday's agenda encompassed the following:

- Singh-Bush bilateral meeting
- Outreach Working Session
- Major Economies Meeting
- G8 Working Lunch with participants from Major Economies Meeting
- Hu-Bush bilateral meeting
- Hu-Medvedev bilateral meeting
- Hu-Harper bilateral meeting
- Hu-Sarkozy bilateral meeting
- Press Conference
- Lee-Bush bilateral meeting
- Hu-Fukuda bilateral meeting
- Singh-Fukuda bilateral meeting
- Calderon-Fukuda bilateral meeting
- Lula da Silva-Fukuda bilateral meeting
- Rudd-Fukuda bilateral meeting
- Yudhoyono-Fukuda bilateral meeting
- Singh-Medvedev bilateral meeting
- Singh-Rudd bilateral meeting

== NGO response ==
International development NGOs and networks reacted with a mixture of disappointment and frustration to the final communiqué of the July 2008 G8 summit in Hokkaido, Japan.

60,000 British citizens and 1,000,000 people worldwide had signed petitions calling on G8 leaders to resolve the food crisis, address climate change, deliver funds for water and sanitation, and provide aid for healthcare and education.

However, concrete plans from the G8 to deliver action on these vital concerns were not forthcoming.

=== Food crisis ===
The G8 registered their deep concern about the current global food crisis, but did not announce tangible or measurable initiatives for tackling it.

According to World Vision the $10 billion pledged since January will make a difference in the short term. Tearfund see the appointment of a G8 Expert Group to monitor the implementation of food security commitments as a positive step, although the lack of measurable plans adopted means that it is unclear exactly what role this group will play.

Many NGOs report that the G8 did not address the structural causes of the food crisis. Instead of delivering trade justice, G8 leaders pushed for even more trade liberalisation for developing countries. The G8 also remained silent on the role of food-price speculation in global markets in making the crisis worse. They also used only vague words on reducing bio-fuels and addressing climate change.

=== Climate change ===
The G8 pledged to cut CO_{2} emissions by half by 2050. However NGOs including CAFOD, ActionAid, Christian Aid, Oxfam, and Save the Children all argue that this is not credible, because there is no agreed baseline year, no agreement on when emissions will peak and begin to decline and no mid-term target on emissions reductions.

$6 billion was pledged to a ‘Climate Investment Fund’. However Christian Aid points out two problems with this. Firstly, the fund will be housed at the World Bank, which has a track record of imposing damaging economic policies on poor countries and is backing a large portfolio of greenhouse gas emitting projects around the world. Secondly, this is not new money - the money will come out of aid budgets, at a time when aid budgets are decreasing.

=== Water and sanitation ===
The international alliance End Water Poverty reports that hopes of a breakthrough in the global sanitation and water crisis at the G8 summit were dashed as the G8 delivered a communiqué largely devoid of concrete actions to help the 2.6 billion people lacking access to a safe toilet, and the 1.1 billion people lacking access to clean water. Instead of agreeing an action plan to tackle what a recent WaterAid report claims kills more children than any other single factor, G8 leaders were content to report on progress at the 2009 summit and take steps to implement the discredited 2003 G8 Evian Water Action Plan.

=== Aid for healthcare and education ===
Tearfund welcomed the fact that G8 leaders committed to provide a projected $60 billion for health over the next 5 years. However, they point out that this falls far short of what is required to achieve the health-related MDGs and Universal Access by 2010. Based on current UNAIDS resource estimates, the G8 share of resources needed for HIV alone is US$65 billion for the next three years. Meanwhile, previous commitments, such as universal access to paediatric treatment, as outlined at Heiligendamm in 2007, are conspicuous by their absence.

There are no timetables for delivery or measurable action plans attached to the communiqué. G8 leaders have agreed to establish a monitoring mechanism but the details remain unclear. Without funding, timetables and monitoring mechanisms, the G8 leaders’ stated concerns about global health will be empty gestures.

According to the Global Campaign for Education, there has been a pledge of $1 billion for education, yet this is less than 10% of what is needed to deliver what is every child's human right.

== Citizens' responses and authorities' counter-responses ==
Over 40 dissidents were arrested before the summit started and nineteen or twenty Koreans critical of the G8 leadership were detained at New Chitose Airport for at least 24 hours. During a "non-violent demonstration where no acts against property or people took place" according to a legal observer, at least four people were arrested, including a Reuters cameraman.

=== Protesters and demonstrations ===
Protests at the summit

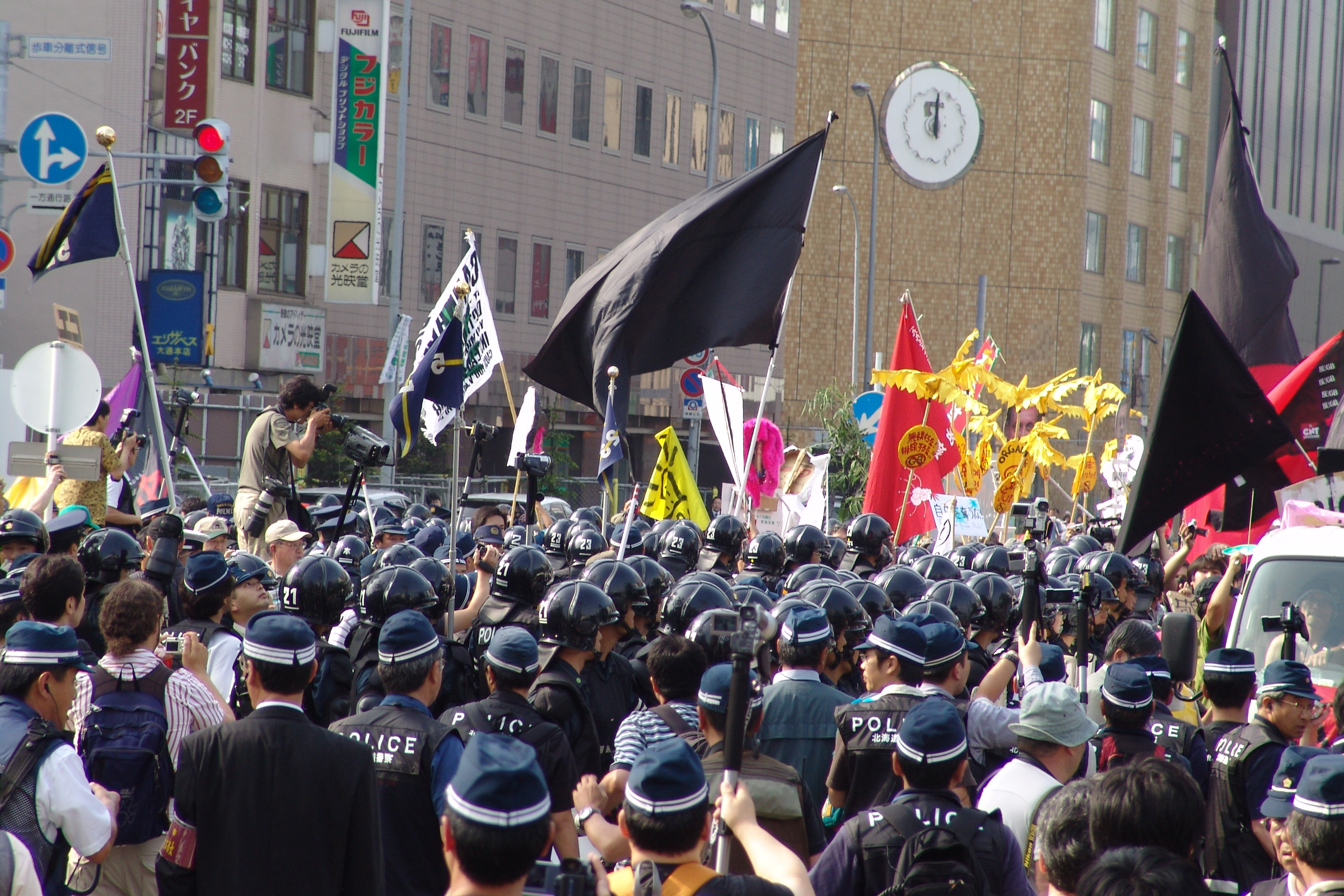
Antiglobalist demonstration march

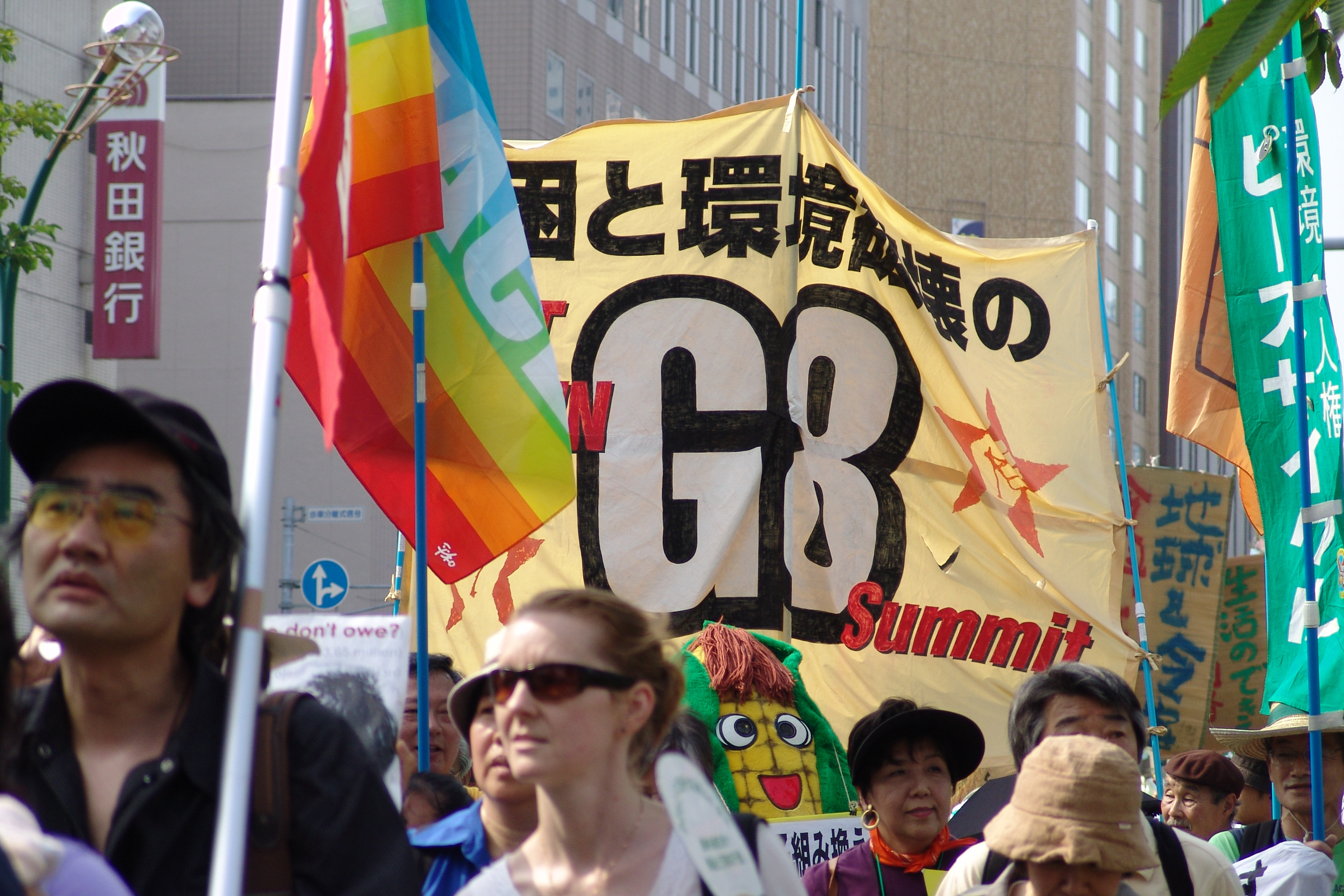
Many of the groups planning protests were coordinated through the G8 Action Network.

Not all demonstrations were agitating in opposition to some issue. At the 2005 Scotland summit, for the first time the tens of thousands of people protesting outside were actually supporting the summit's agenda of African aid; and some activists travelled to Hokkaido for the same purpose. Veteran British actor and Oxfam activist Bill Nighy in Sapporo explained succinctly: "We want to achieve exactly what we wanted to achieve last time (at Heiligendamm, Germany), which is to keep the G8 leaders and their governments to their promise. The promise that they would fulfil the Millennium Development Goals: primary school education for everyone; HIV medicines for all the people that are requiring it; maternal health; sustainable environment. We simply want them not to renege on those promises and to keep it up to schedule. At the moment, they are disastrously behind schedule. So we are looking to remind them of that."

Some protesting organizations in Sapporo during the G8 summit tried to leverage the spirit of the Japanese Tanabata festival to focus attention on what they hope this summit will accomplish. In the evening of July 7, the G8 leaders were invited to create their own tanzaku, and the group was captured by the summit photographer in front of the bamboo on which their private wishes had been tied. The same theme was exploited by non-governmental organizations like Oxfam and CARE International in setting up an online wish petition campaign to coincide with the G8 Summit and Tanabata.

=== Human rights violations and border controls ===
One day before the G8 Finance Ministers' Meeting started in Osaka with a very large police presence, a day labourer in Kamagasaki was allegedly tortured by the police. In response, many day labourers and other local citizens carried out several days of street protests.

During the month before the 34th G8 Summit started, "over 40 people were arrested in pre-emptive sweeps of broad left and anarchist groups".

Just preceding the summit, Via Campesina complained about the detention for over 24 hours of 19 (or 20) Korean farmers at New Chitose Airport and their likely deportation from Japan, stating that the farmers were travelling with an official invitation letter from Nouminren (Japanese Family Farmers' Movement) and a full programme of their planned activities as requested by the authorities. Via Campesina asserted the "right to meet, demonstrate and propose solutions to the problems facing humanity and the environment" and demanded that "all the farmers, workers and other activists detained at the Sapporo Airport be allowed to join the civil society activities parallel to the G8 Summit."

During a "non-violent demonstration where no acts against property or people took place, or even appeared likely to take place" according to Ko Watari, a legal observer, at least four people were arrested, including a Reuters cameraman. The arrestees potentially face "years in prison" according to the "No! G8 Legal Team".

=== Citizen journalism ===
Citizens' groups organized several citizen journalism centres to provide independent media coverage of the expected protests. In a sense, this text is the work product of something like citizen journalism, creating this article as part of "the first rough draft of history."

== Accomplishments ==
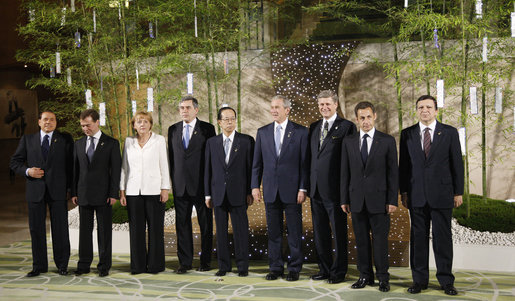
G8 "family photo" at the Hokkaido summit. From left to right: Prime Minister Silvio Berlusconi of Italy; President Dmitry Medvedev of Russia; Chancellor Angela Merkel of Germany; Prime Minister Gordon Brown of the United Kingdom; Prime Minister Yasuo Fukuda of Japan; President George W. Bush of the United States; Prime Minister Stephen Harper of Canada; President Nicolas Sarkozy of France, and José Manuel Barroso, President of the European Commission

The composition of the G8 summit is not an agenda item, but wanted to see the group expand to include China, Mexico, India, Brazil and other major economies like Australia, South Korea, and Spain. The G8 summit is an international event which is observed and reported by news media, but the G8's continuing relevance after more than 30 years is somewhat unclear. More than one analyst suggests that a G8 summit is not the place to flesh out the details of any difficult or controversial policy issue in the context of a three-day event. Rather, the meeting offers an opportunity to bring a range of complex and sometimes inter-related issues. The G8 summit brings leaders together "not so they can dream up quick fixes, but to talk and think about them together."

Analysts anticipate that this will not be a summit in which an ambitious new agenda is mapped out, but rather one which will be cautiously focused on trying to keep the lid on growing global discontent. In 1976, the first year Canada attended, the nations issued a 1,600-word statement that made seven commitments, none of which were ever fully delivered by the members. In 2007, the nations made 329 commitments, about a third of which are being turned into reality. This, defenders of the G8 say, is proof of the summits' continuing effectiveness: the G8 are generally doing a better job than ever before of delivering on pledges made at these annual summit meetings.

The projected evaluation of this G8 summit can be assessed or measured in a context which encompasses the most recent G8 summits. At the 2004 summit at Sea Island in the United States, the G8 leaders agreed to extend debt relief programs for poor countries, but fell short of demands for a total write-off of loans owed by African nations to multilateral lending agencies. The G8 leaders said they would extend the term of the Highly Indebted Poor Countries initiative, under which poor states can write off some of their debt. A summary of accomplishments from the three most recent G8 summits would include:

2005 summit. In Gleneagles in Scotland, the G8 leaders agreed to more than double aid to Africa by 2010; but aid agencies argued there was little new money in the pledge. They also pledged that G8 nations and other donors would increase total aid for all developing countries by about $50 billion a year by 2010. Assistance to Africa was put at the top of the 2005 summit by British Prime Minister Tony Blair; but those well-intentioned plans were thwarted because Blair was forced to return to London after terrorist bomb explosions disrupted London's public transportation. The discussion about African issues was not as fruitful as the regular G8 sessions and had a "fragmented" character. A credible analysis of the summit suggests that Gleneagles stands apart from the other G8 summits ...

It would have been a regular summit if not for the terrorist attacks on London, as odd as it may seem at first sight. Although the tragedy took away a considerable portion of attention that would have otherwise been directed to the world richest and most powerful countries ..., the attacks provided for the relative success of the summit ... due to the necessity to demonstrate the united front against terrorism and to achieve somewhat tangible results that terrorists could not prevent.

2006 summit. In Saint Petersburg in Russia, the G8 leaders agreed to a formal agenda of energy security, combating infectious diseases and promoting education—all topics held little controversy and required no financial commitment by G8 members. Assistance to Africa from the 2005 summit agenda re-appeared on the 2006 agenda; but no tangible actions ensued.

2007 summit. In Heiligendamm in Germany, the G8 leaders agreed to consider a global goal of reducing greenhouse gas emissions and to negotiate a new global climate pact that would extend and broaden the Kyoto Protocols. For Africa, the G8 pledged $60 billion to fight AIDS, malaria, and tuberculosis; but the declaration set out no specific timetable, nor did it break down individual countries' contributions or spell out how much of the total funds had been previously promised.

=== Infrastructure Consortium for Africa ===
The Infrastructure Consortium for Africa (ICA) was established at the 31st G8 summit at Gleneagles, Scotland in the United Kingdom in 2005. Since that time, the ICA's annual meeting is traditionally hosted by the country holding the Presidency of the G8. The 2008 meeting was held in Tokyo in March 2008.

== Budget ==
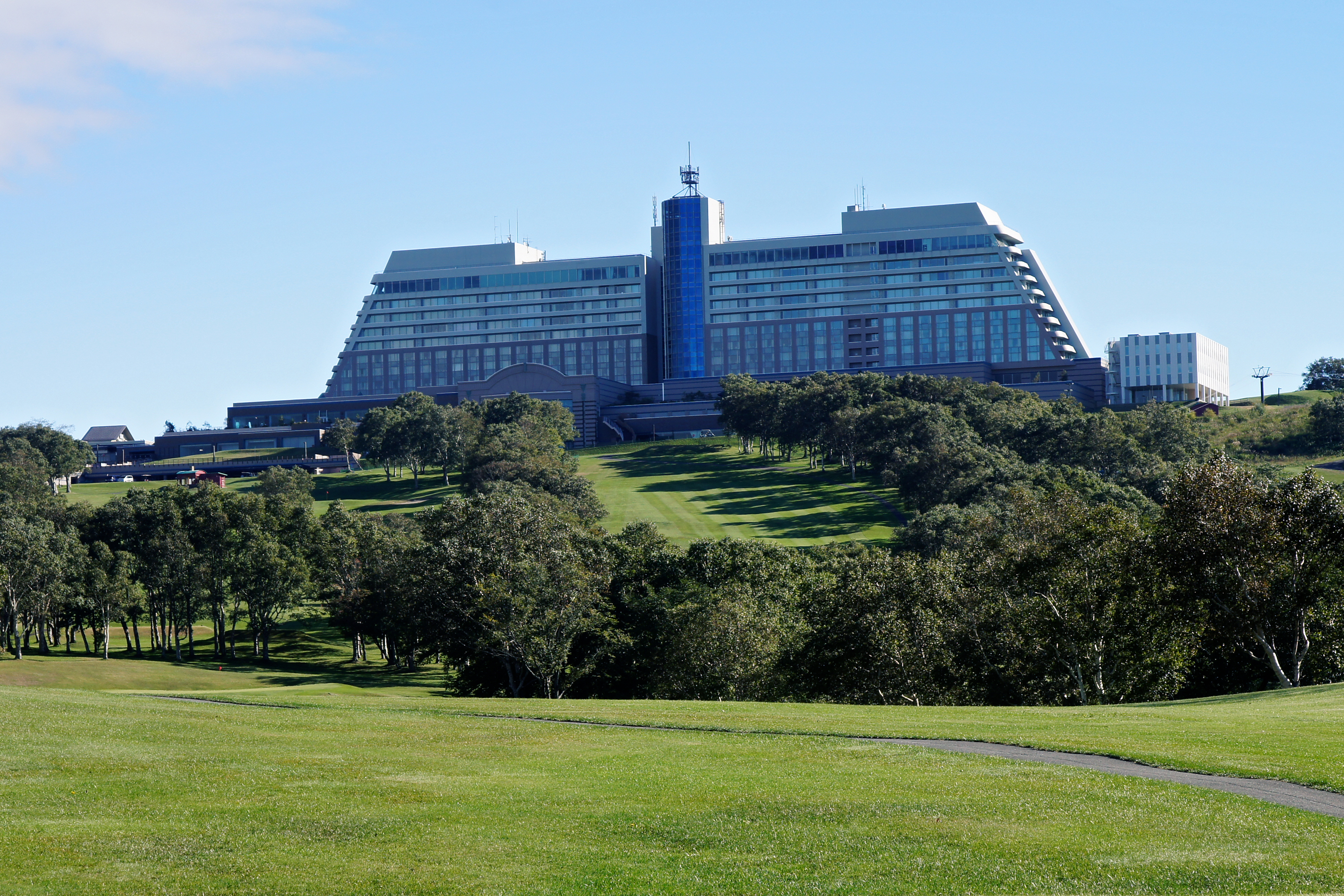
Windsor Hotel Toya Resort & Spa, the main venue for the G8 leaders and delegates

Japan spent an unprecedented amount on hosting the G8 summit. Although a full accounting has not been announced, the estimated total budget was more than ¥60 billion:

- ¥30 billion (£283 million; $561 million) used by the National Police Agency for patrolling the venues, including taking counter-terrorism measures. When the three-day meeting ended, Japanese taxpayers faced a bill which dwarfed the estimated £1.3m Britain stumped up at Gleneagles three years prior. A foreign ministry spokesman suggested that "the number of parties attending this year is unprecedented, which has admittedly complicated the arrangements, and it's simply not fair to compare it with previous summits."
- ¥25.5 billion was spent by the Foreign Ministry.
  1. Approximately ¥9 billion for communications infrastructure between the summit venue in Toyako and Rusutsu, where the international media center was located.
  2. Approximately ¥5 billion for the media center, which was constructed on a parking lot in a ski resort and accommodated around 3,000 people from the press and governments. Inside and outside the center, cutting-edge environmental technology, including fuel cells and heat pumps, was exhibited. The center itself boasted eco-friendly features, including solar panels, "green" walls and a snow cooling system. Once the summit was over, however, the building was demolished.
- ¥1 billion each for the Defense Ministry and Japanese Coast Guard for transporting the leaders and patrolling sea areas near the venue and monitoring the 46 km no-fly zone surrounding the summit site.

The Times reported that the estimated cost of the Hokkaidō summit topped $285 million.

== Notable statistics ==
=== Delegates ===
Security

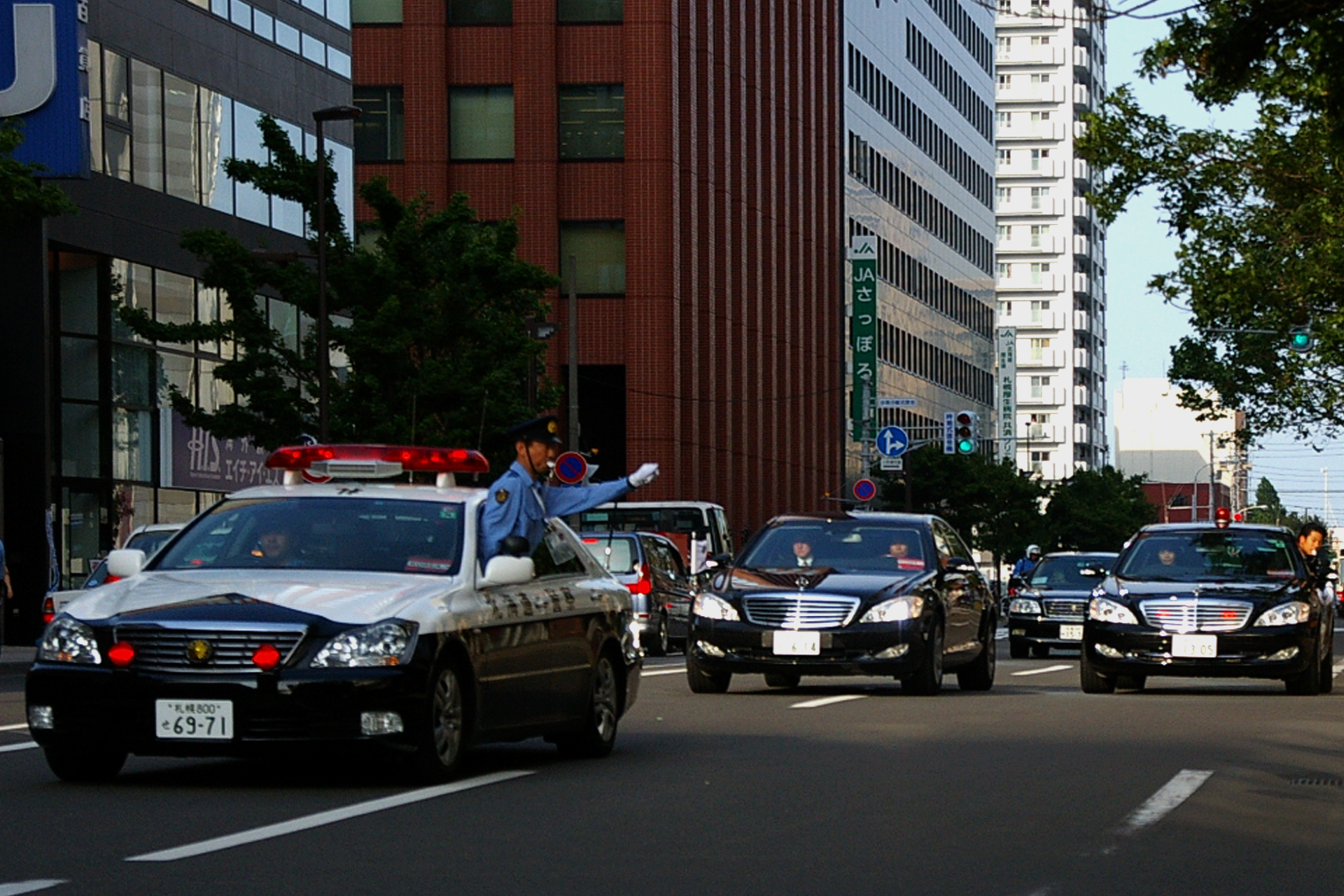
Security Police undertaking VIP duties in Hokkaido.

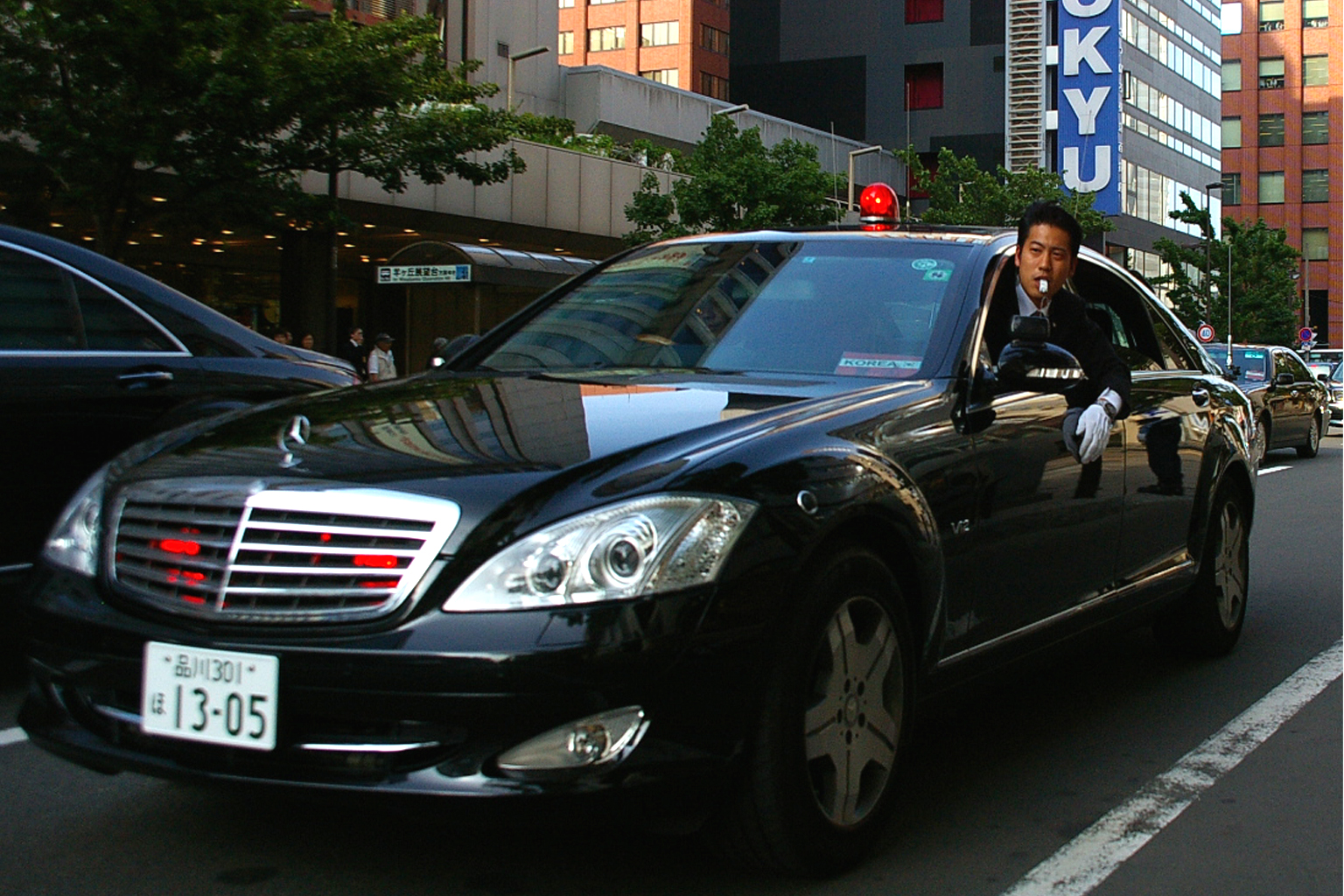
Security Police in a Mercedes-Benz S600. A placard in the window shows these SP officers are escorting the South Korea delegation.

With more than 2,000 delegates in total, it was the largest G8 summit ever. Besides the leaders of the G8 nations attending, there were the government leaders of seven African nations and representatives from the five developing countries. Also in attendance were leaders from Australia, Indonesia, and South Korea.

=== Logistics ===
- Media: There were approximately 4,000 journalists covering the summit from a specially built ¥2.8-billion ($25.92-million), media center. One hundred antennas were put up for mobile phones.
- Site: The world leaders stayed at Windsor Hotel Toya Resort, located on the peak of the 625m tall Mount Poromoi, overlooking Lake Tōya.
- Security: There were more than 20,000 police providing ground-based security. Military security included 4 fighter jets, AWACS reconnaissance, 12 warships, and Patriot surface-to-air-missiles.
- Human rights: Over 40 dissidents were arrested before the summit started. At least 4 people were arrested, including a Reuters cameraman, during what a legal observer claimed was a "non-violent demonstration where no acts against property or people took place."
- Freedom of speech: Nineteen or twenty Koreans critical of the G8 leadership and expected to participate in citizens' debates were detained by the Japanese authorities at New Chitose Airport for at least 24 hours and were expected to be deported.
- Cost: The total cost of the three-day summit has been estimated at ¥60-billion.
- Food: Fifty chefs from 23 local hotels created special meals using 105 different local products; and the first night banquet featured 19 dishes. Expressed differently, the summit leaders enjoyed a six-course lunch followed by an eight-course dinner.
- NGOs: More than 140 non-government organizations are holding an alternative summit in the prefectural capital of Sapporo.

== Business opportunity ==
For some, the G8 summit became a profit-generating event; as for example, the G8 Summit magazine which has been published under the auspices of the host nations for distribution to all attendees since 1998.

Hokkaido's small businesses which were located near the summit site discovered that most of their customers were policemen during the event; and the tourist trade was virtually dead." The Guardian reported one shop owner's terse point of view: "I just want to get this summit over and done with so we can get back to normal."

In contrast, a foreign ministry spokesman focused on the exposure Toyako [Lake Toya] received in the international media; and he argued that the short-term sacrifice would prove to be worthwhile in terms of long-term business opportunities.

== Gallery of participating leaders ==
=== Core G8 participants ===
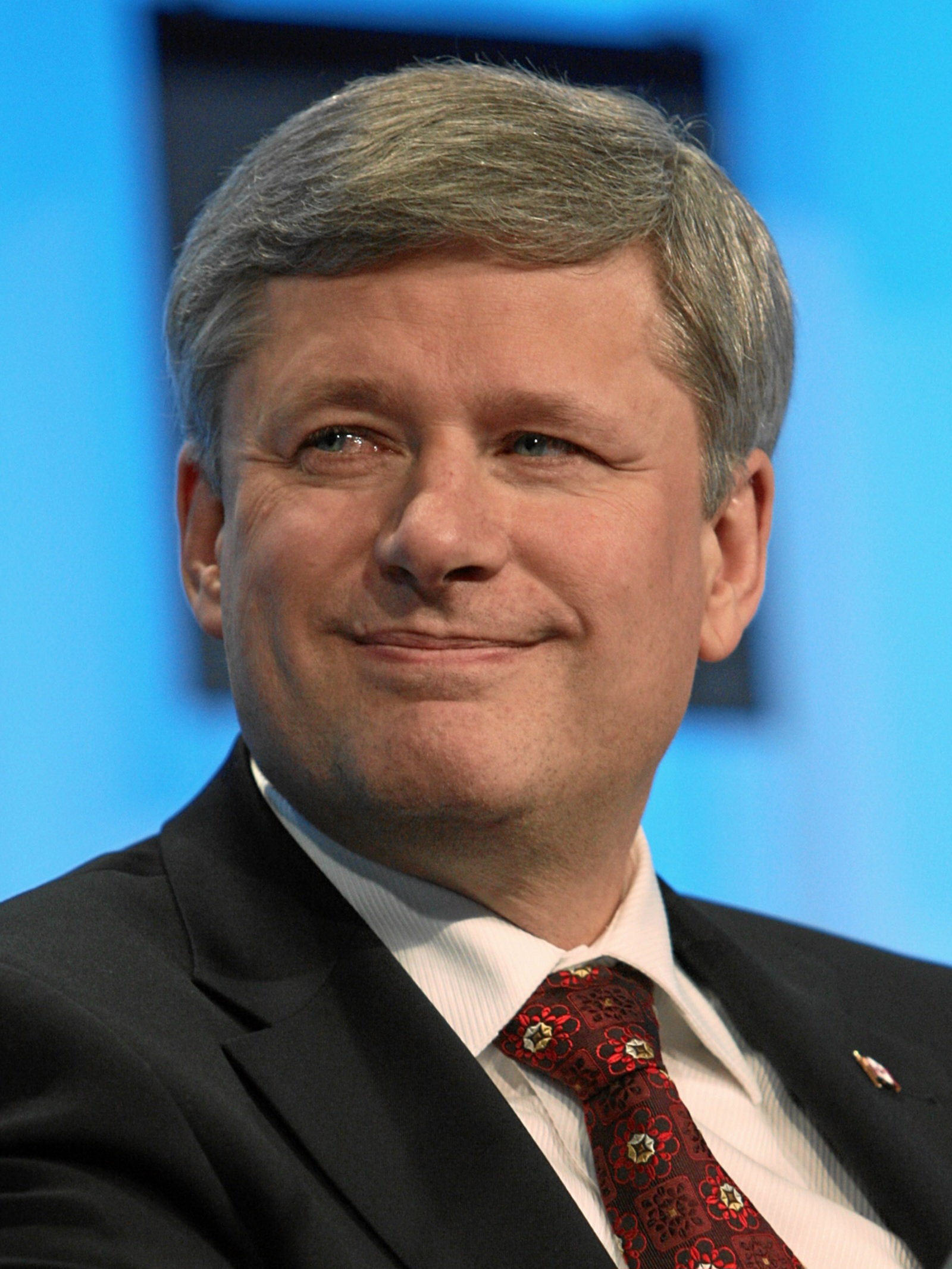
(Canada) Canada
Stephen Harper,
Prime Minister

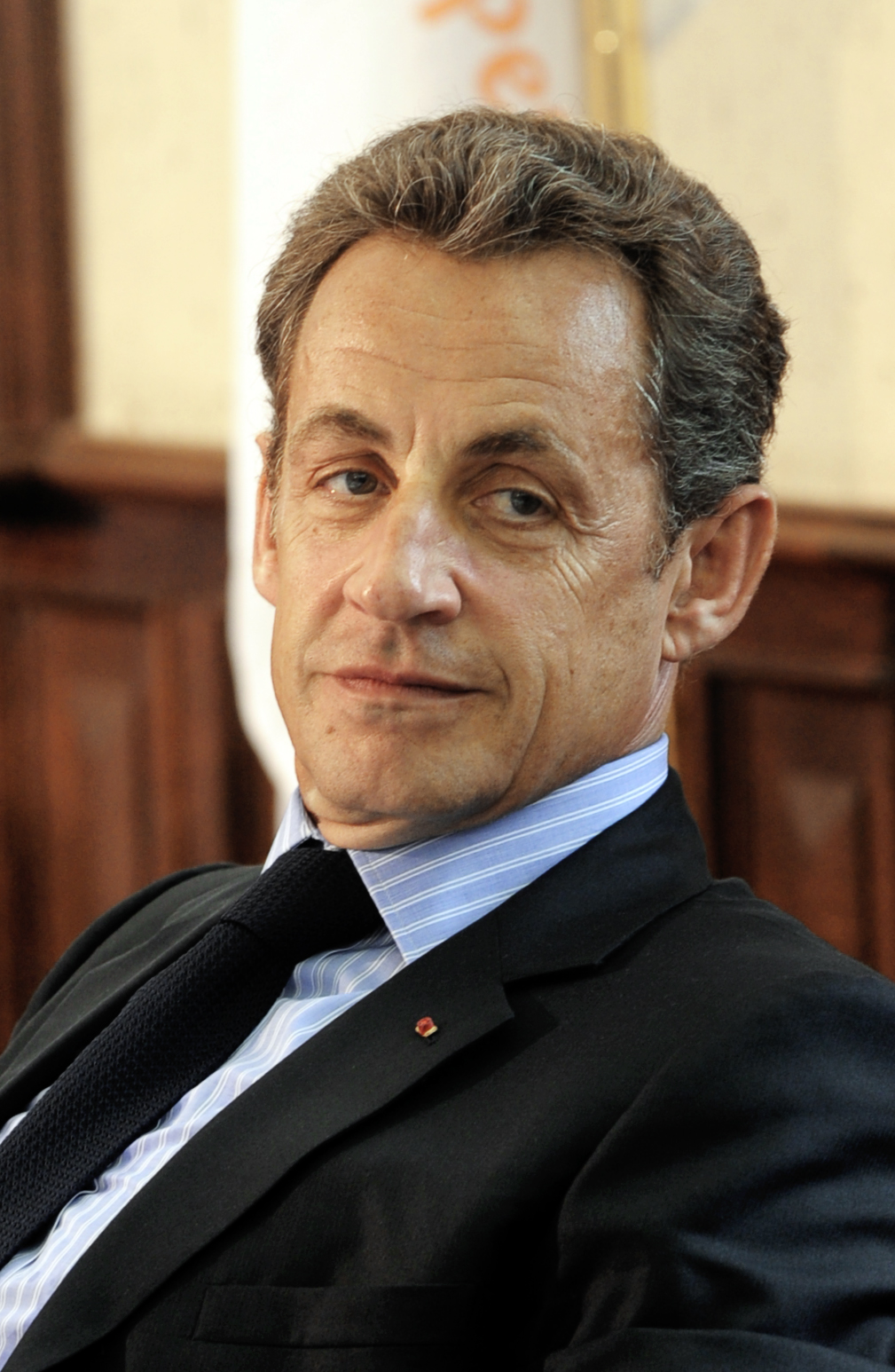
(France) France
Nicolas Sarkozy,
President

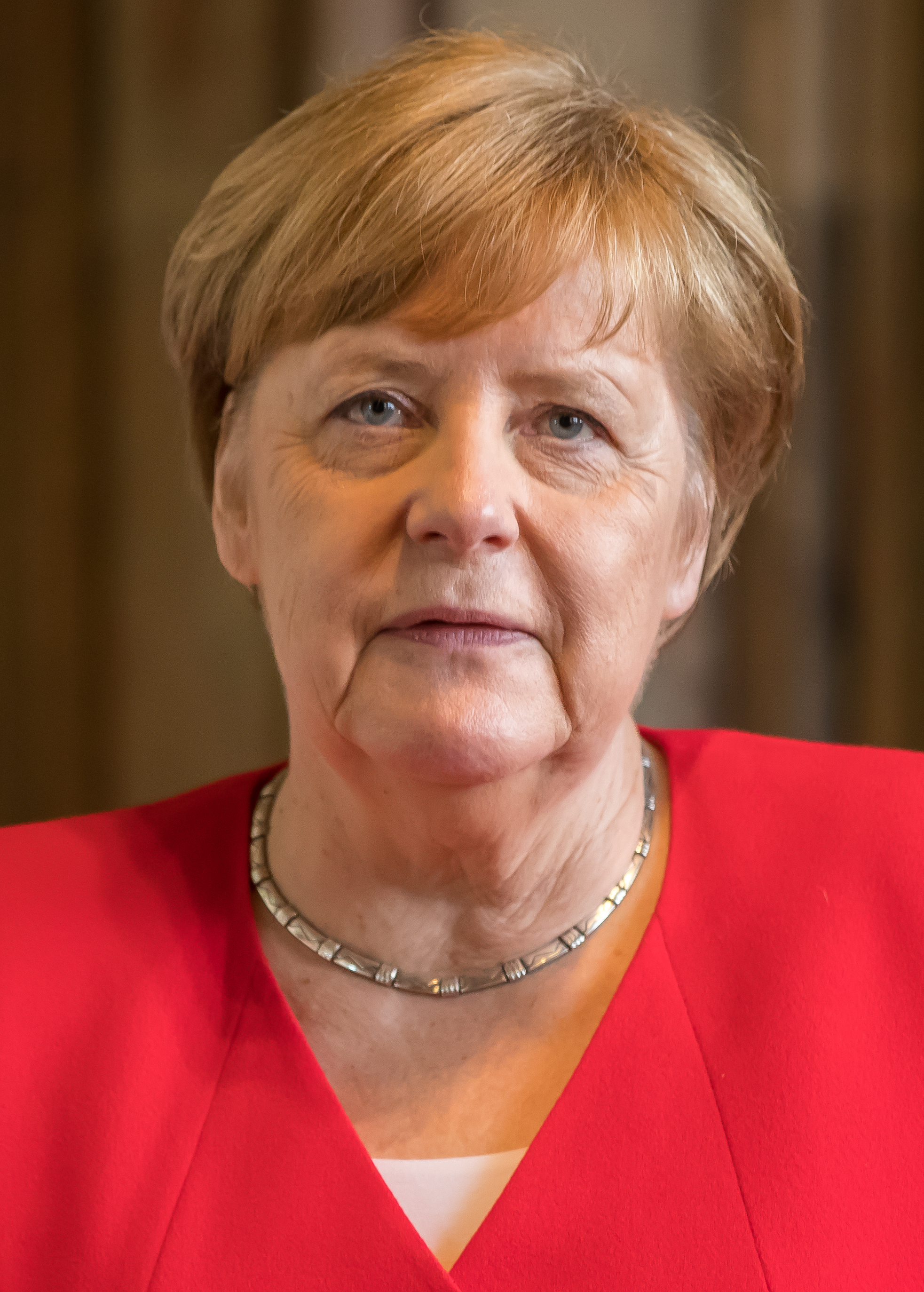
(Germany) Germany
Angela Merkel,
Chancellor

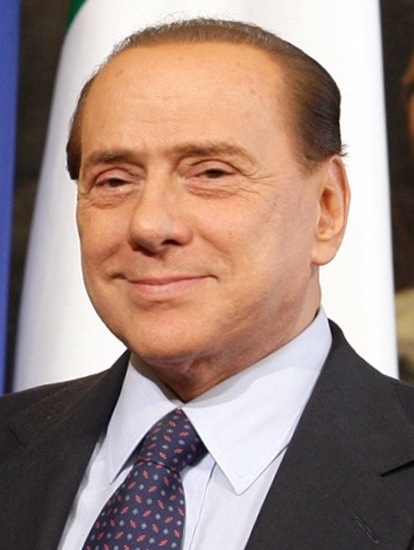
(Italy) Italy
Silvio Berlusconi,
Prime Minister

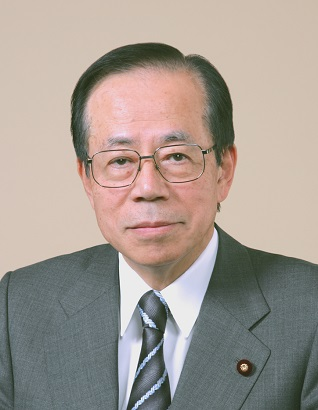
(Japan) Japan
Yasuo Fukuda,
Prime Minister (Host)

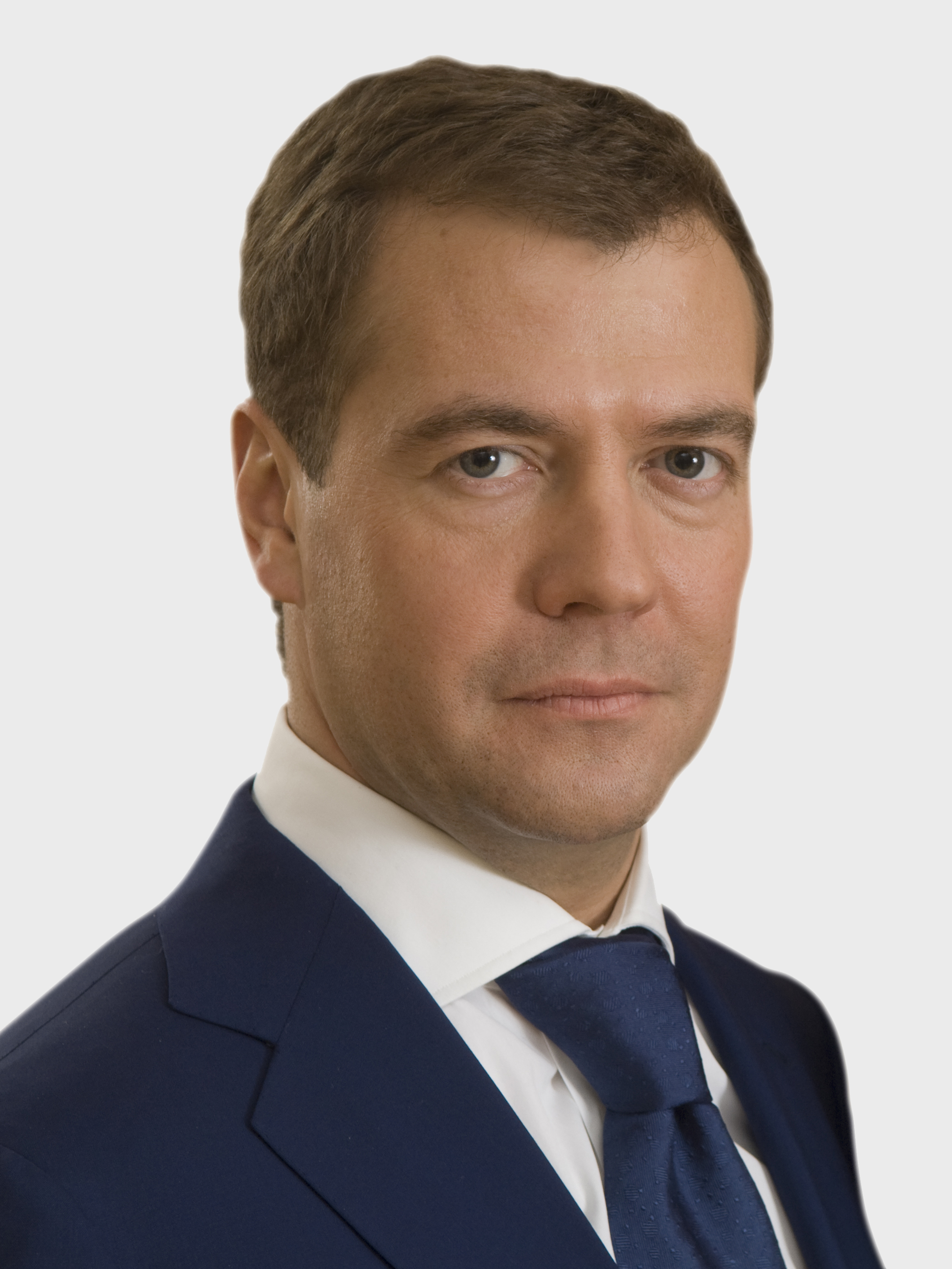
(Russia) Russia
Dmitry Medvedev,
President

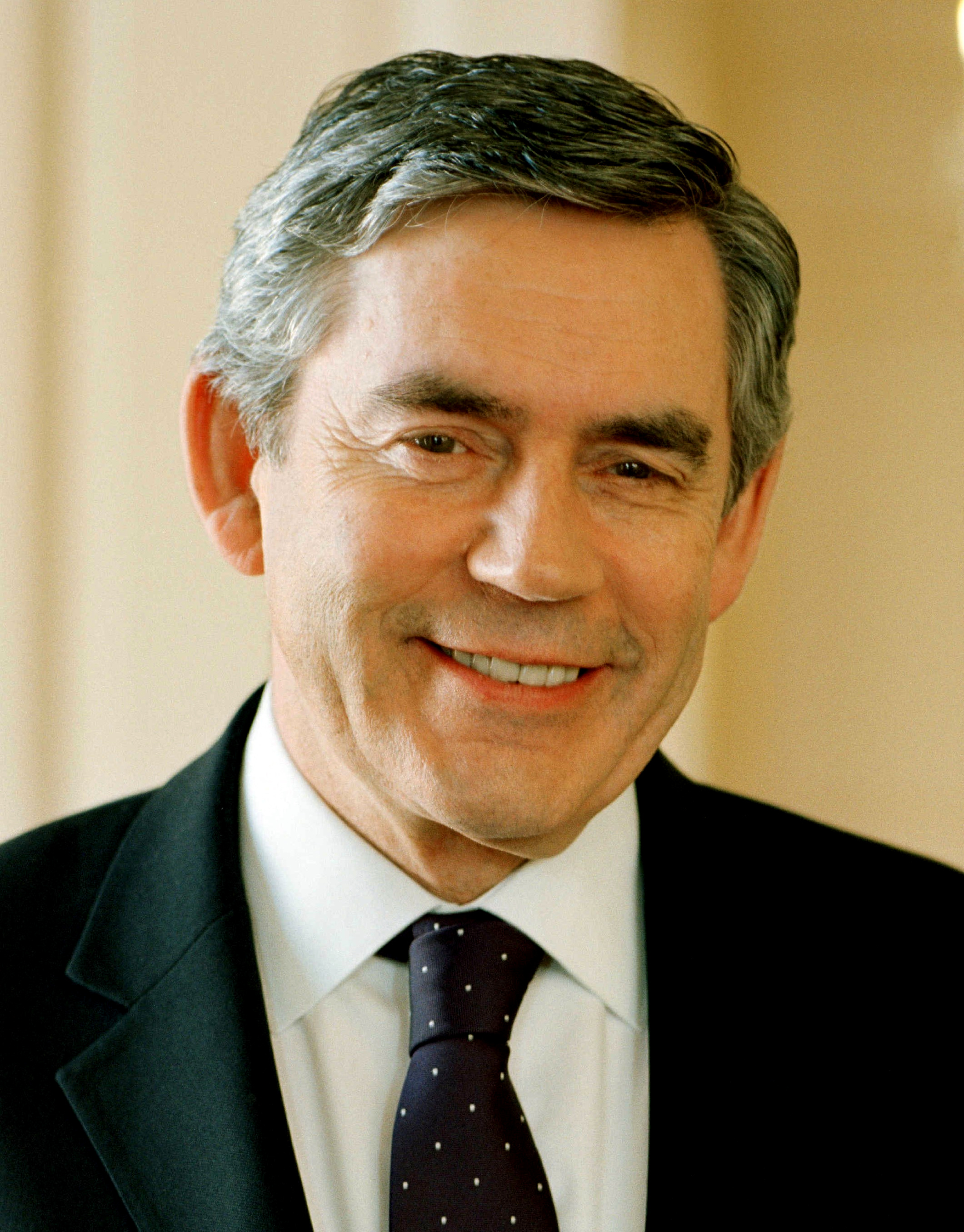
(United Kingdom) United Kingdom
Gordon Brown,
Prime Minister

(United States) United States
George W. Bush,
President
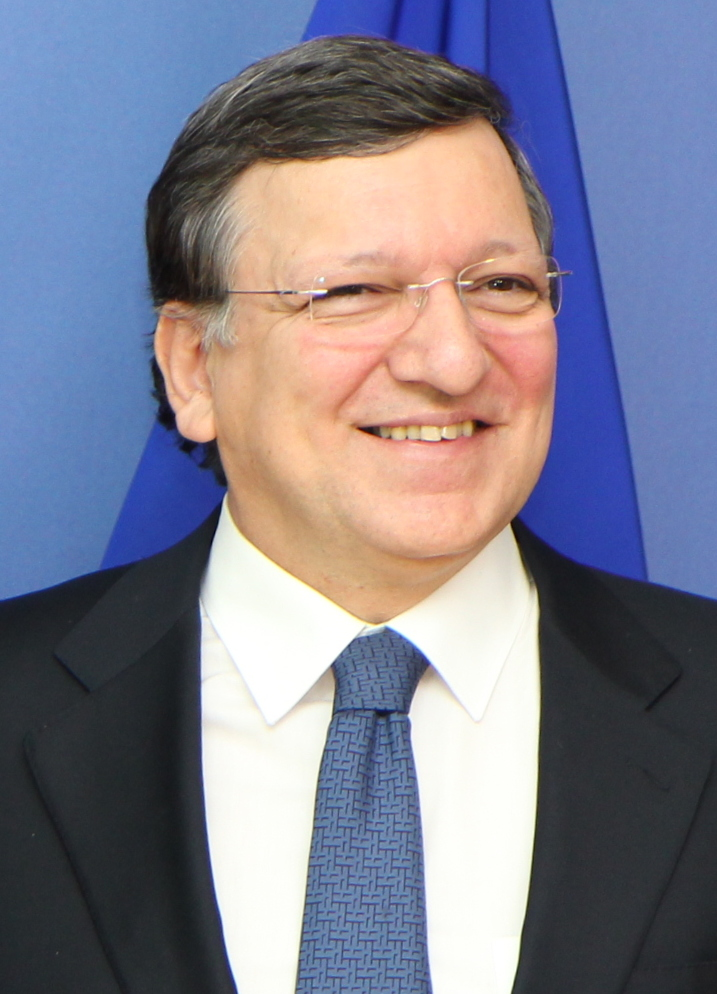
(European Union) European Union
Jose Manuel Barroso,
Commission President

== See also ==
- Cool Earth 50
- Intergovernmental Panel on Climate Change
- The Monster X Strikes Back/Attack the G8 Summit, a Japanese kaiju comedy film depicting a monster attack on the summit
- United Nations Framework Convention on Climate Change
