= Cool Earth 50 =

Cool Earth 50 (also known as Cool Earth) is a plan developed by Japan to reduce global CO_{2} emissions 50% by 2050, which was discussed at the 34th G8 summit. Cool Earth 50 is planned to be a framework that would continue towards the goals set forth in the Kyoto Protocols. This plan includes three proposals: a long-term strategy, a mid-term strategy and launching a national campaign for achieving the Kyoto Protocol Target.

The plan was first proposed on May 24, 2007, at an international conference called Asian Future and was initiated by Japanese Prime Minister Shinzo Abe. The program's goal is to reduce current global green house emissions by 50% by the year 2050. The goal of reduction was aimed particular towards the largest green house emitting countries The United States, China, Japan, and India. Also, for the major green house emitters to create a frame work for reduction. Cool Earth aims at reducing green house emissions by improving technology in energy fields. A large goal of Cool Earth is to promote economic prosperity through green technology and to encourage political stability domestically and internationally.

== Proposals ==
The proposals of this program include:

1. A long-term strategy for global reduction of greenhouse gas emissions.
2. Propose three principles for establishing an international framework for addressing global warming from 2013 onward.
3. To launch a national campaign to ensure Japan achieves the Kyoto Protocol goal.

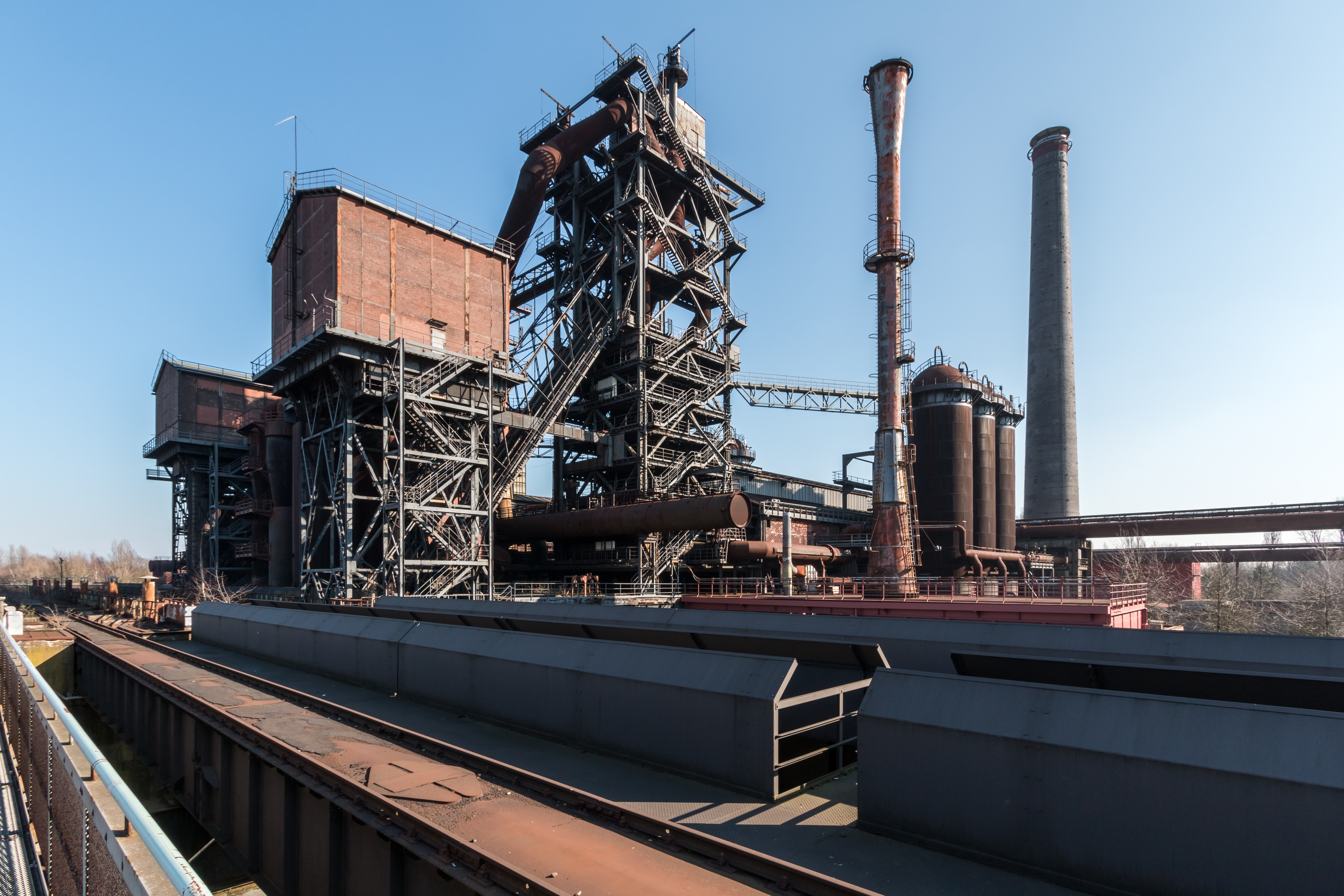
Blast Furnace

In addition, the proposal sets to make technological advancements in:

- Zero-emissions coal-fired power generation
- Reactors for nuclear power generation
- Technology for high-efficiency and low-cost solar power generation
- Technology for the use of hydrogen
- Ultra high energy efficiency technology

== Course 50 ==
Course 50 is a CO_{2} reduction strategy to reduce CO_{2} emissions by 30%. The aim of Course 50 is to suppress CO_{2} emissions from blast furnaces and to capture CO_{2} from blast furnaces. The goal is to reach reduction by the year 2030. The programs first phase was initiated in the year 2008 and funded by New Energy and Industrial Technology Development Organization.The original budget was approximately 10 billion yen. Course 50 is encouraging innovation in technology towards more effective CO_{2} capturing polymers, as well as temperature reduction and improved efficiency of blast furnaces in the steel industrious.

== Solar ==
Solar panels

Japan with Cool Earth has been expanding their solar power industry offering subsidies to improving solar powered infrastructure. The main research goal is to achieve a low cost high efficiency solar cell that offers a conversion efficiency of 40%.

== Hydrogen power ==
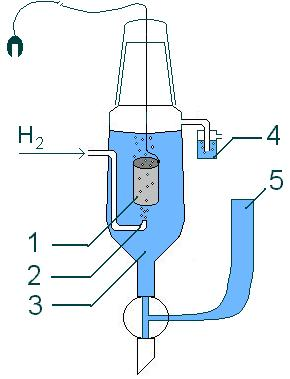
Hydrogen cell

In 2009, Japan fitted over 100,000 homes with hydrogen powered fuel cells, improving its hydrogen powered infrastructure.

== Energy efficient technology ==
New development of LED light bulbs that utilize blue and white light has improved efficiency by over 25% since 2008. The use of SerDes router technology having the capability to reduce energy waste from routers by over 50%.

== See also ==
- Climate change in Japan
- Emissions reduction efforts
