= Global Warning =

Global Warning may refer to:

- Global Warning (Jon Oliva's Pain album), 2008
- Global Warning (Rascalz album), 1999
- Global Warning (Turmion Kätilöt album), 2020
- WWE Global Warning, 2002 WWE tour of Australia

== See also ==
- Global warming
