= Global Warming: The Signs and The Science =

- Narrated by: Alanis Morissette
- Country of origin: United States
- Original language: English

Original release
- Network: PBS
- Release: 2005

Global Warming: The Signs and The Science is a 2005 documentary film on global warming made by ETV, the PBS affiliate in South Carolina, and hosted by Alanis Morissette. The documentary examines the science behind global warming and pulls together segments filmed in the United States, Asia and South America and shows how people in these different locales are responding in different ways to the challenges of global warming to show some of the ways that the world can respond.
