= List of G8 summit resorts =

List of G8 summit resorts includes past and prospective venues for the annual meetings of G8 heads of state, the President of the European Union and other invited guests.

The choice of a site for these summit meetings is left entirely to the host nation. The location choices of host nations have been informed in some cases by perceived pre- and post-summit economic benefits.

The serial accounts of these summits have tended to focus on international macro-consequences; but the host-country's decision-making has also seemed to focus on micro-consequences which have been otherwise overshadowed or overlooked.

== Summit venues ==
Host venues of G7 summits in North America
Host venues of G7 summits in Europe
Host venues of G7 summits in Japan

Sortable Table of G7/G8 Summit Locations
Resort	Location	Summit (ordinal)	comments
Carbis Bay Hotel	Carbis Bay, Cornwall, UK,	47, the 47th G7 summit	Held from 11 to 13 June 2021 during the UK's presidency of the G7. The AUKUS deal was brokered here without French knowledge. The 2020 summit was cancelled due to COVID-19 so this was the first since 2019.
Dorado Beach Hotel and Country Club	Dorado, Puerto Rico,	2, the 2nd G7 summit	The Dorado Beach Hotel, then a Rockefeller family-owned RockResort, was chosen by President Gerald Ford as the venue for the June, 1976 G7 economic summit, the first one held on U.S. soil. Two participants, the British Prime Minister and the French President, arrived at the San Juan International Airport in Carolina, Puerto Rico on their own Concordes, while President Ford arrived on the Boeing 707 that served as one of the traditional Air Force One aircraft.
Château Montebello	Montebello, Quebec, Canada	7, the 7th G7 summit	Château Montebello, renowned for reportedly being the world's largest log "cabin". In 1981, the Château played host to the G7 economic summit, and leaders such as Pierre Trudeau, Margaret Thatcher, Ronald Reagan and François Mitterrand were guests of the hotel.
Kananaskis Resort	Kananaskis, Alberta, Canada	28, the 28th G8 summit	The Kananaskis Resort (also called the "Delta Lodge at Kananaskis"), was host site for the summit on June 26 and June 27, 2002. This was the second time Canada used a lodge venue for the G8 Summit, after its inaugural 7th G7 Summit at Montebello. The 2002 Summit in Kananaskis generated an estimated $300 million in short-term regional economic benefits.
Deerhurst Resort	Huntsville, Ontario, Canada	36, the 36th G8 summit	The Deerhurst Resort was the location of the 2010 summit, at the Deerhurst Resort the fifth G8 Summit hosted by Canada since 1976.
Gleneagles Hotel	Ochil Hills of Perth and Kinross, Scotland	31, the 31st G8 summit	The Gleneagles name has nothing to do with eagles, but is said to be a corruption of the Scottish Gaelic word for a church, or a gap in the hills. It is famous for its hotel, and golf course, and also hosted the controversial G8 conference in July 2005, which earned the area the nickname of "the most fortified golf course in Scotland" due to extensive security.
Grand Hotel Heiligendamm	Heiligendamm on the Mecklenburg, Germany	33, the 33rd G8 summit	The Grand Hotel consists of six buildings, which were all built as a seaside resort between 1793 and 1870. The main building (Haus Grandhotel) was built in 1814 and reopened on June 1, 2003, after three years of reconstruction work. The seaside resort was first established in 1793, when Friedrich Franz I, Grand Duke of Mecklenburg-Schwerin visited Heiligendamm, upon advice by Dr. Samuel Gottlieb Vogel.
Sea Island	Sea Island, Georgia, United States	30, the 30th G8 summit	Sea Island is an isolated resort island located in unincorporated Glynn County just off the Atlantic coast of southern Georgia in the United States. Sea Island is part of the group of islands known as the Golden Isles of Georgia together with Jekyll Island, St. Simons Island, and Little St. Simons Island. As with previous sites of the G8 meeting, the venue is remote, easily secured, and has a history of luxurious accommodations. As part of the security measures, the Department of Homeland Security (DHS) designated the 30th G8 summit|summit a National Special Security Event (NSSE).
Windsor Hotel Toya Resort & Spa	Tōyako, Japan	34, the 34th G8 summit	The Windsor Hotel Toya Resort was the main conference site of the fifth G8 summit to take place in Japan.
Lough Erne Resort	Lough Erne, County Fermanagh, Northern Ireland, United Kingdom	39, the 39th G8 summit	The 39th G8 summit was conducted on 17–18 June 2013 at Lough Erne.
Schloss Elmau	Schloss Elmau, Bavaria, Germany	41, the 41st G7 Summit.	The 41st G7 Summit was conducted on 7–8 June 2015 at Schloss Elmau, near Garmisch-Partenkirchen in Bavaria.
Shima Kanko Hotel	Kashiko Island, Shima, Mie Prefecture, Japan.	42, the 42nd G7 Summit.	The 42nd G7 Summit was conducted on 26–27 May at the Shima Kanko Hotel in Kashiko Island, Shima, Mie Prefecture, Japan.
