= Grand Hotel Heiligendamm =

Hotel in Heiligendamm, Germany

Coordinates: 54.143692°N 11.843208°E

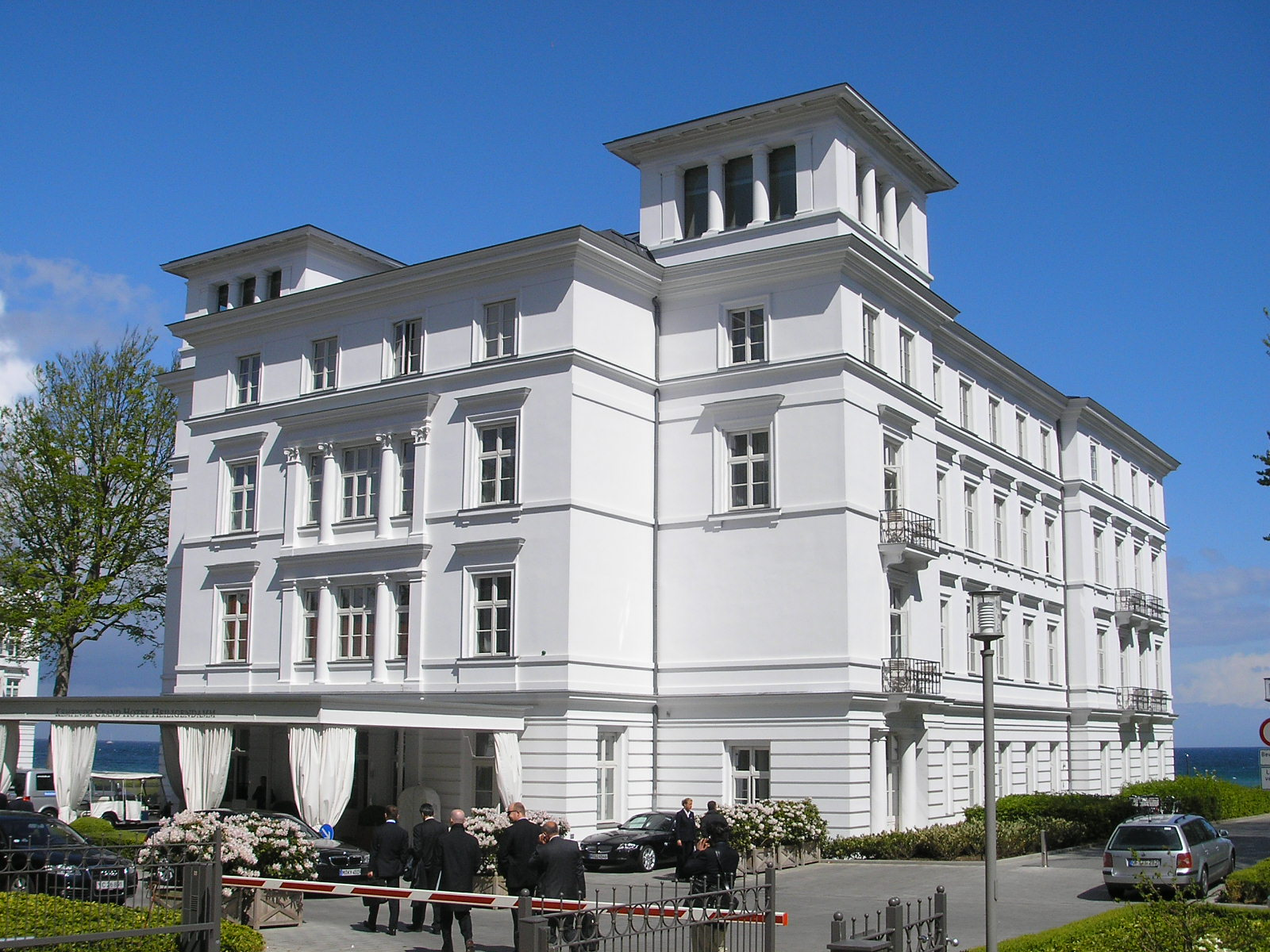
Grand Hotel Heiligendamm, main building

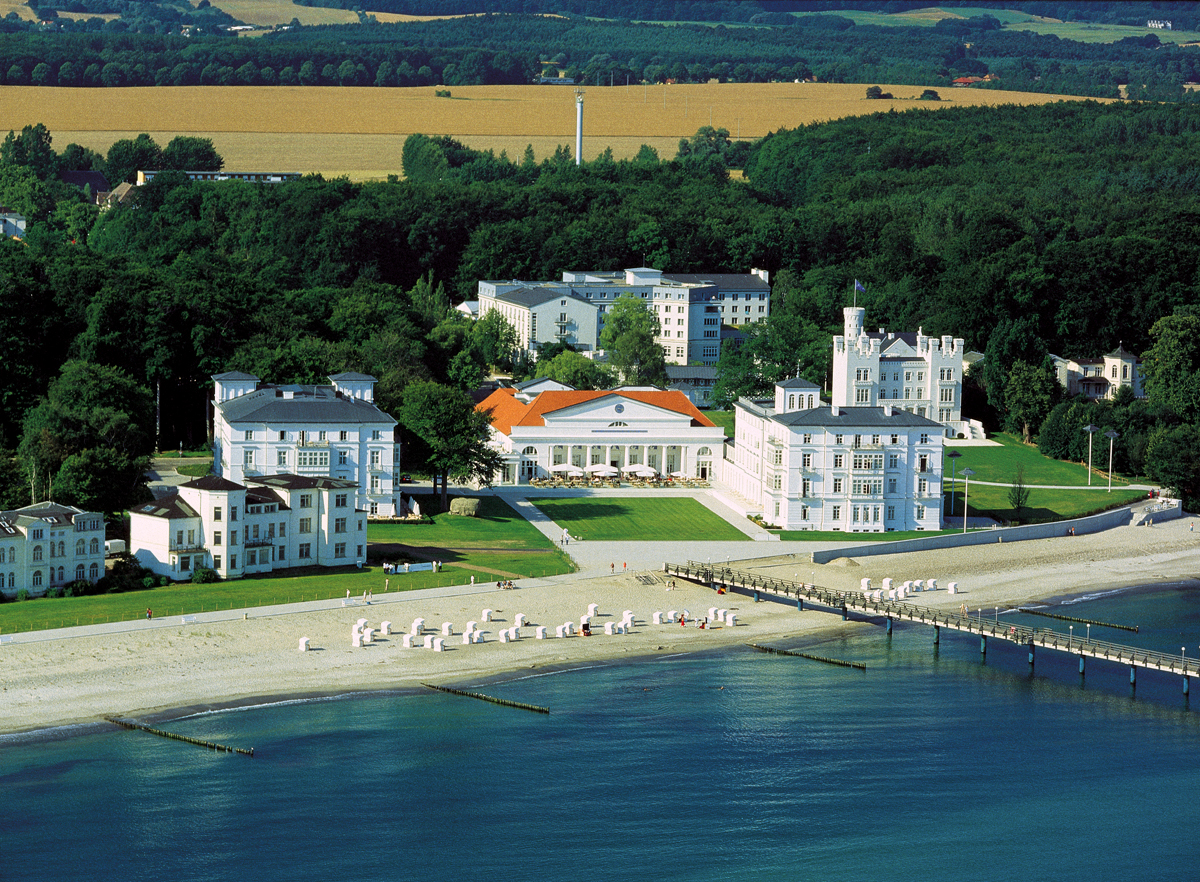
Aerial view of the luxury hotel complex

The Grand Hotel Heiligendamm is a luxury hotel in Heiligendamm on the Mecklenburg Baltic coast in Germany. The Hotel was formerly managed by the Kempinski hotel group.

The complex consists of six buildings which were all built as a seaside resort between 1793 and 1870. It is renowned to be the first example of resort architecture. The main building (Haus Grandhotel) was built in 1814 and reopened on June 1, 2003 after three years of revitalisation work. The seaside resort was first established in 1793, when Friedrich Franz I, Grand Duke of Mecklenburg-Schwerin visited Heiligendamm, upon advice by Dr. Samuel Gottlieb Vogel.

The seaside town languished during the period in which it was within the borders of the former East Germany, but the investment of the Kempinski hotel group becomes a first step in a process of 21st-century re-development for this 19th-century destination resort.

In June 2007 it hosted the 33rd G8 summit. As a result, thousands of anticapitalist activists blocked the roads to Heiligendamm and an estimated 25,000 anti-globalization protesters demonstrated in nearby Rostock; the protesters had little effect on the leaders of the top industrialized nations because they could not get close enough to the building.

== See also ==
- List of G8 summit resorts
- List of hotels in Germany
