= One Delisle =

Toronto skyscraper

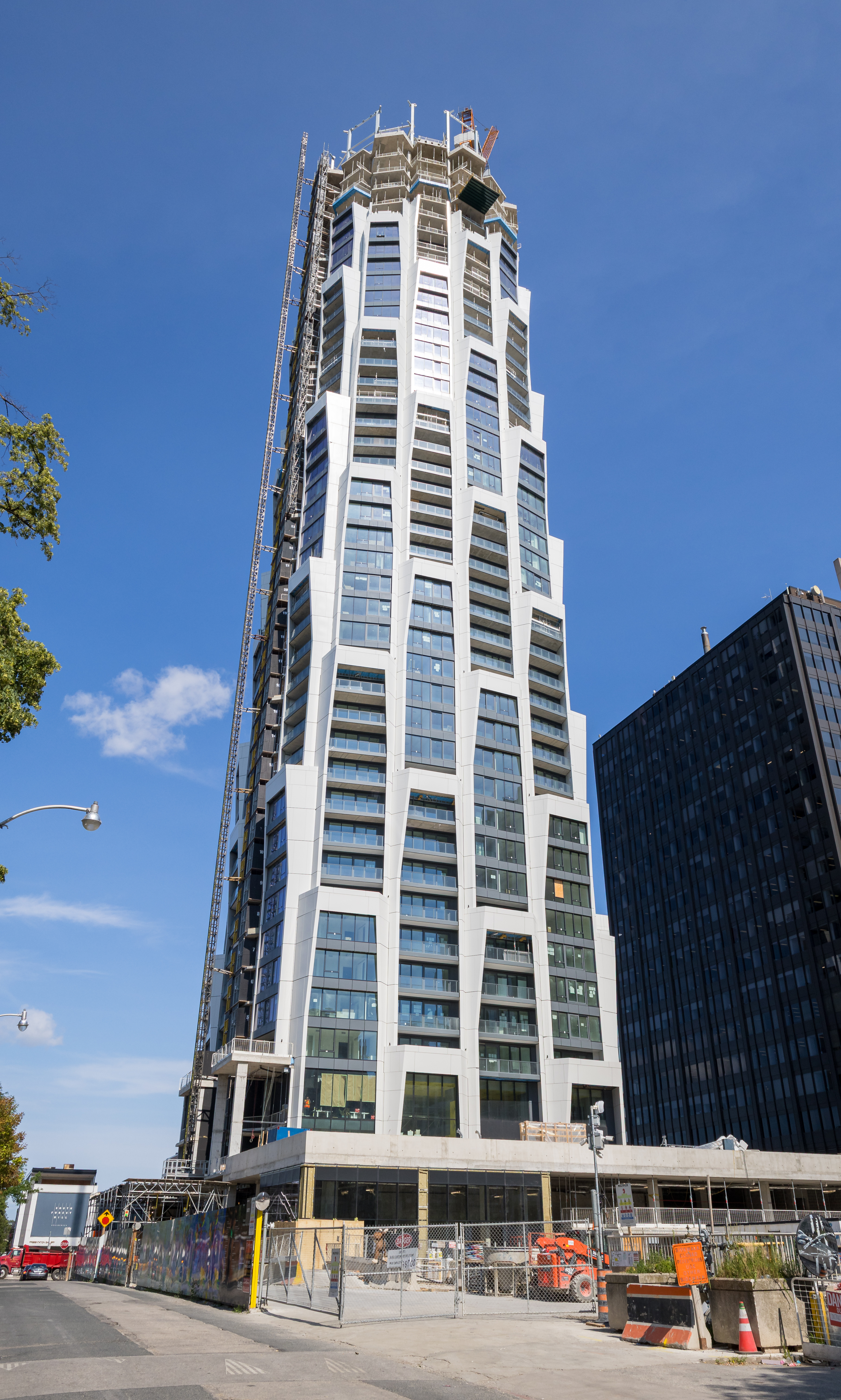
Construction progress on One Delisle in July 2026

One Delisle is an topped-out residential skyscraper in the Deer Park area of Toronto, Canada. Designed by Studio Gang, the 48-storey building reaches a height of 158 metres (518 feet). It will become the tallest building in Deer Park neighbourhood upon its expected completion in 2027. Studio Gang has claimed that the design of the tower was inspired by Strandkorb chairs.

== See also ==
- List of tallest buildings in Toronto
