= Strandkorb =

Hooded windbreak seating furniture for beaches

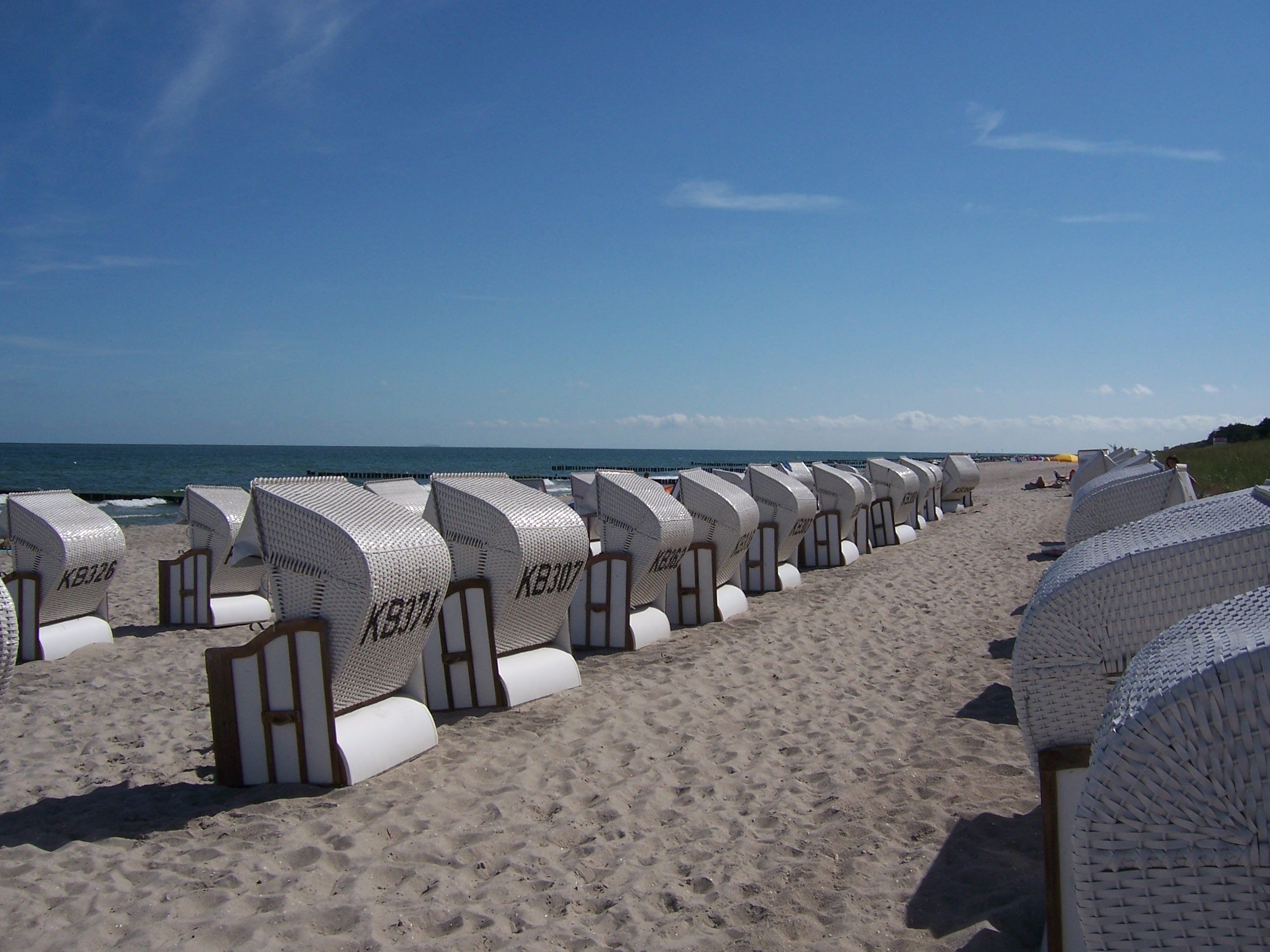
Rows of Strandkorb beach-chairs for hire at Zingst beach seafront, Germany, 2006

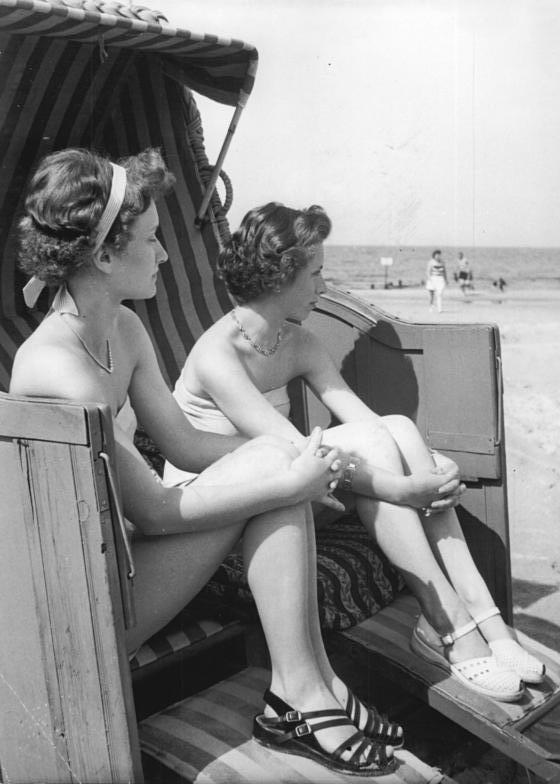
Tourists occupying a Strandkorb beach-chair on Darß peninsula, Germany, 1955

Video demonstration showing the functions of a Strandkorb beach-chair

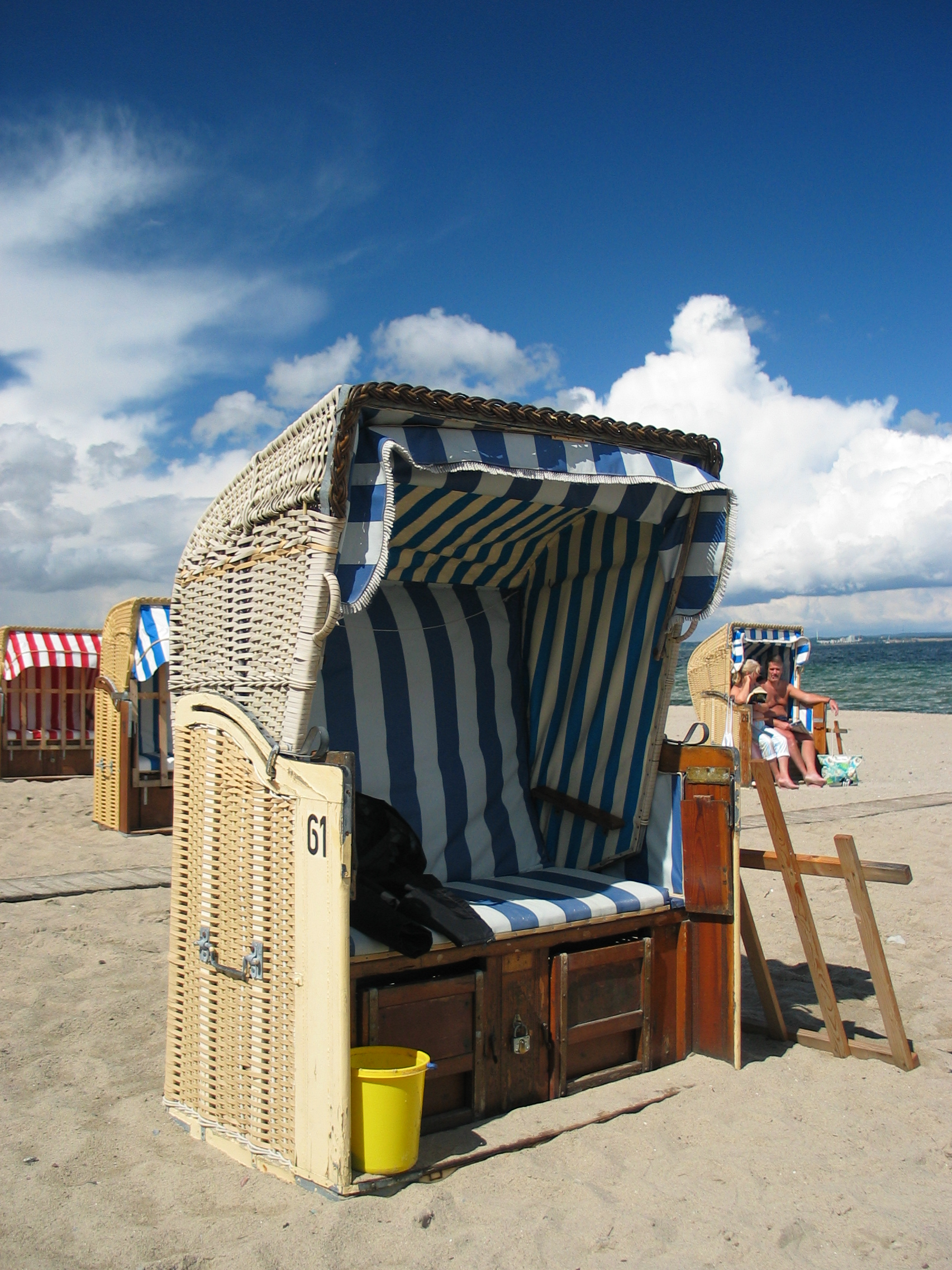
Strandkorb typical for the Baltic Sea beaches

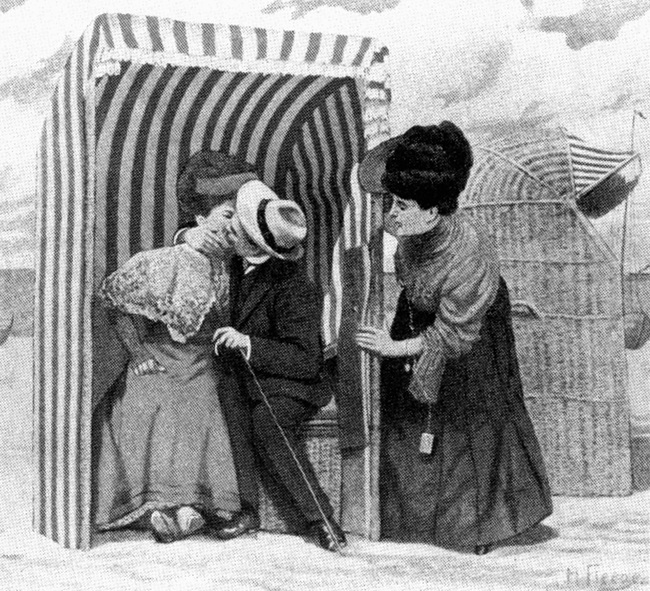
A postcard of 1900 depicting a Strandkorb

A Strandkorb (from German, lit. meaning: 'beach basket'; Danish: strandkurv; English: 'hooded beach chair') is a special hooded windbreak seating furniture used at vacation and seaside resorts, constructed from wicker, wood panels and canvas, usually seating up to two people, with reclining backrests. It was designed to provide comfort seating and shelter from wind, rain, sand gusts and sunburn on beach seafront resorts frequented by tourists. Other built-in details, like extendable footrests, sun awning, side folding tables and storage space, provide the user with several comforts.

Strandkörbe are found at nearly all beach seafront resorts of the North Sea and Baltic Sea in Lower Saxony, Schleswig-Holstein and Mecklenburg-Vorpommern, as well as other beach seafronts where sudden fluctuations in adverse weather conditions and wind gusts can prevail. The Strandkorb beach-chair is considered a cult object of German Gemütlichkeit, which has survived two world wars, social and industrial revolutions and the East-West divide of Germany. From spring to autumn, they can usually be rented from beach-chair wardens (German Strandkorbwärter). Two different shapes can be distinguished, the straight angular North Sea variety and the round rolling Baltic Sea variety.

== Origin ==
The "Strandkorb" beach-chair was invented in 1882 by German basket maker Wilhelm Bartelmann in Rostock, originally for his customer Elfriede Maltzahn, who suffered from rheumatism and had requested in his workshop a "seating accommodation for the beach that would provide shelter from the sun and wind". Bartelmann's family were basket makers from Lübeck. At age 25, Wilhelm opened his own basket weaving workshop in Rostock, where he also became court appointed basket-maker to the Grand Duke of Mecklenburg-Schwerin. Bartelmann's "beach-chair" caused such great sensation among other beach-visitors, who also wanted to sit comfortably at the beach, that demand for his "Strandkorb" soared. In 1883, Bartelmann's wife Elisabeth opened the first "Strandkorb" rental service near Warnemünde Lighthouse in Warnemünde. The first models were single seaters and appeared quickly on other parts of the German coast; a year later Bartelmann also developed a two-seat version. Since about 1910, the two-seat Strandkorb has become the standard, changing little in design and construction.

Thomas Mann refers to Strandkorbs (using the words Strandkorb and Sitzkorb) in his 1901 novel Buddenbrooks, anachronistically setting the context in the 1840s on the beach at Travemünde.

== History ==
The manufacture of wicker-armchair furniture with covered high-rising hoods have been known and handed down in the European basket makers craft-work since the late 16th-century. The furniture was used mainly for large cold rooms and draughty indoor settings. Its use is known in both town and farm houses in the Netherlands and Germany, in the 18th-century such seating furniture were also found in palaces in England, Scotland and Ireland.

== Special designs ==
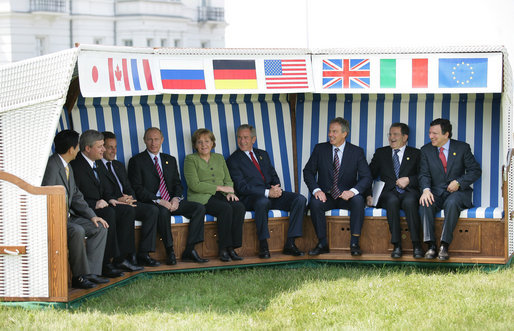
Specifically manufactured Strandkorb at the 2007 G8 summit in Heiligendamm, Mecklenburg

When the 2007 G8 summit in Heiligendamm met in June 2007, the Marketing Department of the State of Mecklenburg-Vorpommern provided a special beach chair manufactured specifically for the leaders of the eight participating states and the President of the European Commission to use for a final photo. These photographs taken on June 8, 2007 have gained some international notoriety. The beach chair is a good two meters high and almost six meters long. It was produced by the traditional Korb GmbH of Heringsdorf on the Baltic island of Usedom. All employees of the company were involved in the production of the chair, which lasted three weeks. It needed two kilometres of interlace, a cubic meter of timber, sourced from domestic pine, and 35 square meters blue and white cloth. The sun awning was printed with the respective country flags.

After the event the beach chair was transported to different locations over some months as an item of interest for tourists and locals. Among other things, it was displayed in Berlin in front of the Chancellor's Office, at the Brandenburg Gate, and the day of German unity on October 3, 2007 in Schwerin. In November 2007 the beach chair was auctioned off in aid of the charity Ein Herz für Kinder ('A heart for children'). The founder of the Deutsche Vermögensberatung AG (DVAG), Reinfried Pohl, purchased it for the price of one million Euro. Since 2008 it is used for further fund-raising.
