= Samuel Gottlieb Vogel =

German physician (1750–1837)

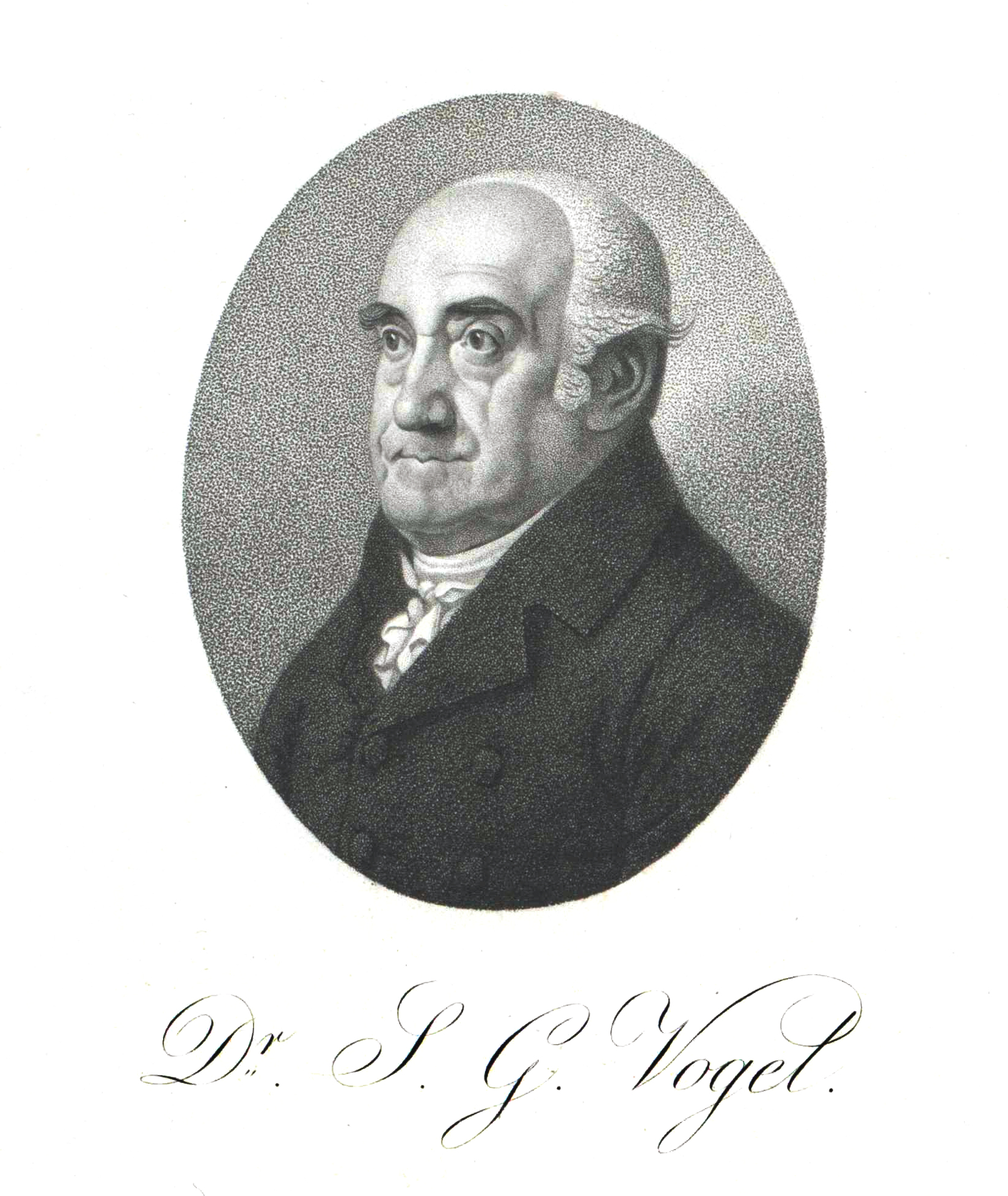
Samuel Gottlieb Vogel.

Samuel Gottlieb von Vogel (14 March 1750, Erfurt, Holy Roman Empire – 19 January 1837) was a German medical doctor. He was a promoter of sea bathing for health and is considered the founding father of German seaside resorts.

Vogel was born to Göttingen physician Rudolf Augustin Vogel, who came from Erfurt. He started studying medical science in Göttingen at the age of 14. In 1771 he attained a doctorate and in 1776 he achieved habilitation. He first started working as a physician in Göttingen, later moving to Ratzeburg. In the meantime he published several medical books. He recommended preputial infibulation as a means to prevent masturbation by males in his 1786 text for parents and teachers. He also published an influential book on clinical chemistry. In 1789 he became professor of medical faculty at the University of Rostock. While serving as the personal physician to Duke Friedrich Franz I of Mecklenburg-Schwerin in 1793 he began to promote the healing power of seaside resorts and helped found Heiligendamm. He served as spa doctor there until his death and was succeeded by Johann Hermann Becker. Vogel was also a Privy Councilor and received a Prussian Order of the Red Eagle. He was a freemason and was associated with the Masonic Temple of Truth, Rostock from 1800. He was ennobled in 1832 and died of a flu in 1837.
