= 33rd G8 summit =

2007 international leader meeting in Germany

Coordinates: 54°08′35″N 11°50′30″E

33rd G8 Summit
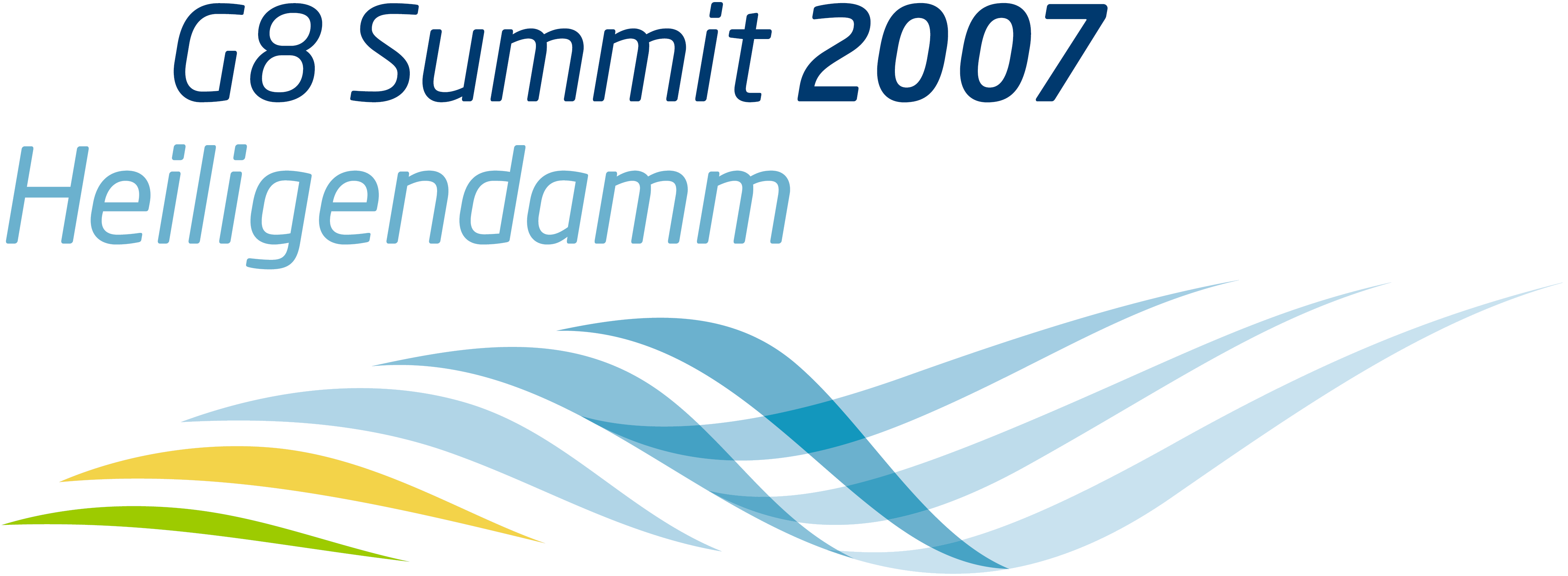

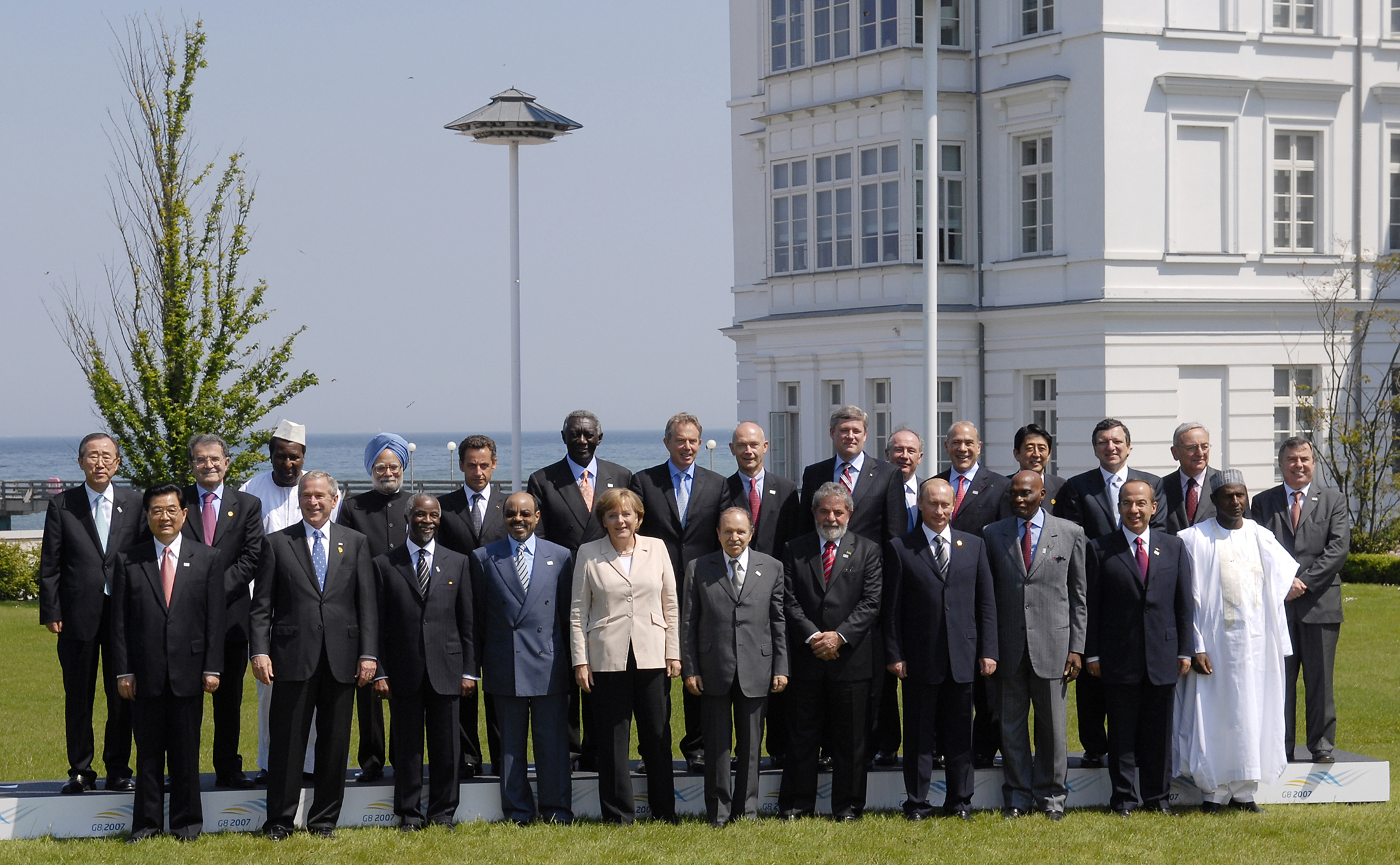
- Group photo of the leaders of the G8 and outreach countries
- Host country: Germany
- Dates: 6–8 June 2007
- Cities: Bad Doberan
- Venues: Grand Hotel Heiligendamm
- Follows: 32nd G8 summit
- Precedes: 34th G8 summit

The 33rd G8 summit was held at Kempinski Grand Hotel, 6–8 June 2007. The summit took place in Heiligendamm, Bad Doberan, in the Northern German state of Mecklenburg-Vorpommern on the Baltic Coast. The locations of previous G7 / G8 summits to have been hosted by Germany include Bonn (1978, 1985), Munich (1992), and Cologne (1999).

== Overview ==
The Group of Seven (G7) was an unofficial forum which brought together the heads of the richest industrialized countries: France, Germany, Italy, Japan, the United Kingdom, the United States, and Canada starting in 1976. The G8, meeting for the first time in 1997, was formed with the addition of Russia. In addition, the President of the European Commission has been formally included in summits since 1981. The summits were not meant to be linked formally with wider international institutions; and in fact, a mild rebellion against the stiff formality of other international meetings was a part of the genesis of cooperation between France's president Valéry Giscard d'Estaing and West Germany's chancellor Helmut Schmidt as they conceived the initial summit of the Group of Six (G6) in 1975.

The G8 summits during the 21st century have inspired widespread debates, protests and demonstrations; and the two- or three-day event becomes more than the sum of its parts, elevating the participants, the issues and the venue as focal points for activist pressure.

== Leaders at the summit ==
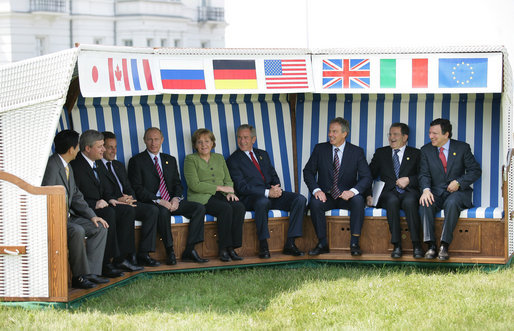
G8 leaders sitting in a Strandkorb at Grand Hotel Heiligendamm

The G8 is an unofficial annual forum for the leaders of Canada, the European Commission, France, Germany, Italy, Japan, Russia, the United Kingdom, and the United States.

The 33rd G8 summit was the first summit for French President Nicolas Sarkozy. It was also the last for British Prime Minister Tony Blair and Italian Prime Minister Romano Prodi

=== Participants ===
These summit participants are the current "core members" of the international forum:

**Core G8 members** Host state and leader are shown in bold text.
Member		Represented by	Title
(Canada)	Canada	Stephen Harper	Prime Minister
(France)	France	Nicolas Sarkozy	President
(Germany)	**Germany**	**Angela Merkel**	**Chancellor**
(Italy)	Italy	Romano Prodi	Prime Minister
(Japan)	Japan	Shinzō Abe	Prime Minister
(Russia)	Russia	Vladimir Putin	President
(United Kingdom)	United Kingdom	Tony Blair	Prime Minister
(United States)	United States	George W. Bush	President
(European Union)	European Union	José Manuel Barroso	Commission President
(European Union)	European Union	**Angela Merkel**	Council President
**Guest Invitees (Countries)**
Member		Represented by	Title
(Algeria)	Algeria	Abdelaziz Bouteflika	President
(Brazil)	Brazil	Luiz Inácio Lula da Silva	President
(China)	China	Hu Jintao	General Secretary; President
(Ethiopia)	Ethiopia	Meles Zenawi	Prime Minister
(Ghana)	Ghana	John Kufuor	President
(India)	India	Manmohan Singh	Prime Minister
(Mexico)	Mexico	Felipe Calderón	President
(Nigeria)	Nigeria	Umaru Musa Yar'Adua	President
(Senegal)	Senegal	Abdoulaye Wade	President
(South Africa)	South Africa	Thabo Mbeki	President
**Guest Invitees (International Institutions)**
Member		Represented by	Title
	African Union	John Kufuor	Commission chairman
	African Union	Alpha Oumar Konaré	Chairperson
(Commonwealth of Independent States)	Commonwealth of Independent States	Nursultan Nazarbayev	Executive Secretary
(International Atomic Energy Agency)	International Atomic Energy Agency	Mohamed ElBaradei	Director General
(United Nations)	United Nations	Ban Ki-moon	Secretary-General
(UNESCO)	UNESCO	Kōichirō Matsuura	Director-General
	World Bank	Paul Wolfowitz	President
(World Health Organization)	World Health Organization	Margaret Chan	Director-General
	World Trade Organization	Pascal Lamy	Director-General

== Priorities ==
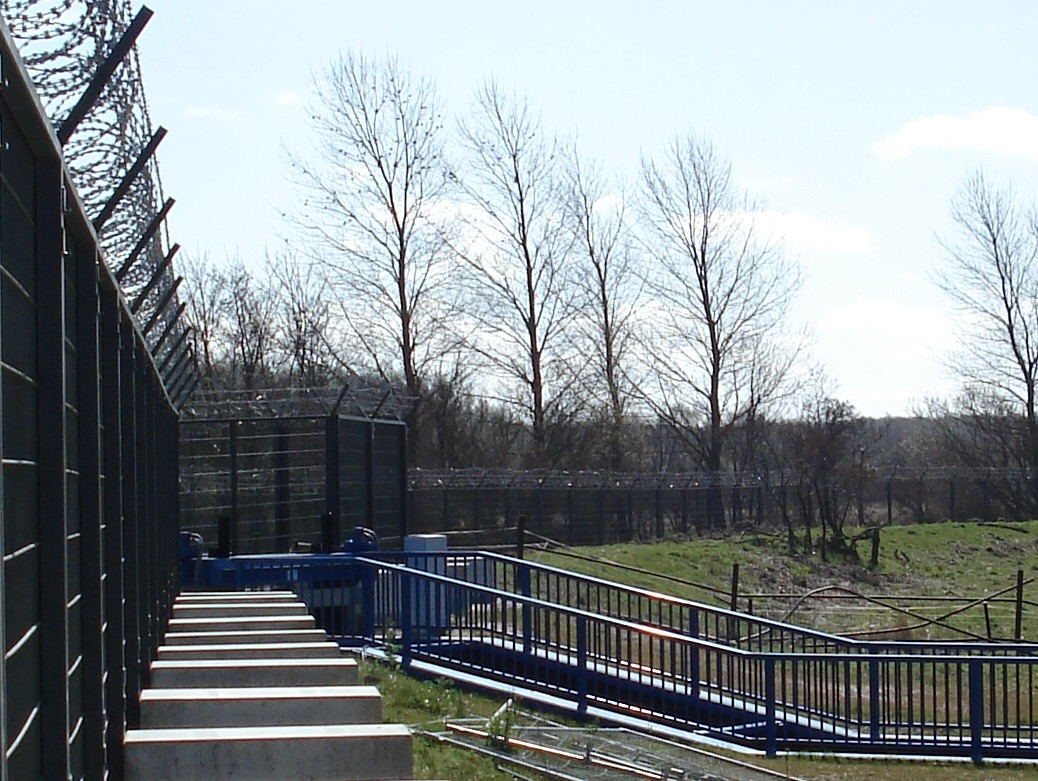
The Heiligendamm security fence was designed not to fail.

Traditionally, the host country of the G8 summit sets the agenda for negotiations, which take place primarily amongst multi-national civil servants in the weeks before the summit itself, leading to a joint declaration which all countries can agree to sign. In any event, security for the world leaders and for the venue remained a high priority throughout.

== Issues ==
The summit was intended as a venue for resolving differences among its members. As a practical matter, the summit was also conceived as an opportunity for its members to give each other mutual encouragement in the face of difficult economic decisions. The G8's traditional focus on macroeconomic issues and trade continued to be important, but this core was augmented by an expanded focus on the environment, meeting Millennium Development Goals and cross-border security issues like terrorism. Trans-national crime also remained in the forefront of summit issues.

== Schedule and agenda ==
At the end of the 32nd G8 summit in Russia, German Chancellor Angela Merkel reported that the agenda of the G8 summit in 2007 had not been determined, but "the struggle against poverty across the globe will be a priority."

According to the official German Presidency website, the summit's motto was "Growth and Responsibility", focusing on "Investition, Innovation und Nachhaltigkeit (Investment, Innovation and Sustainability)", and "Africa: good governance, sustainable investment, peace and security". Transparency of the financial markets, intellectual property and energy efficiency will also be on the agenda, as well as talks about climate change.

On 13 April 2007, Oil Change International released a reported leaked draft of the economic communique. The G8 financial ministers began pre-summit meetings on 30 May 2007.

== Protests and demonstrations ==
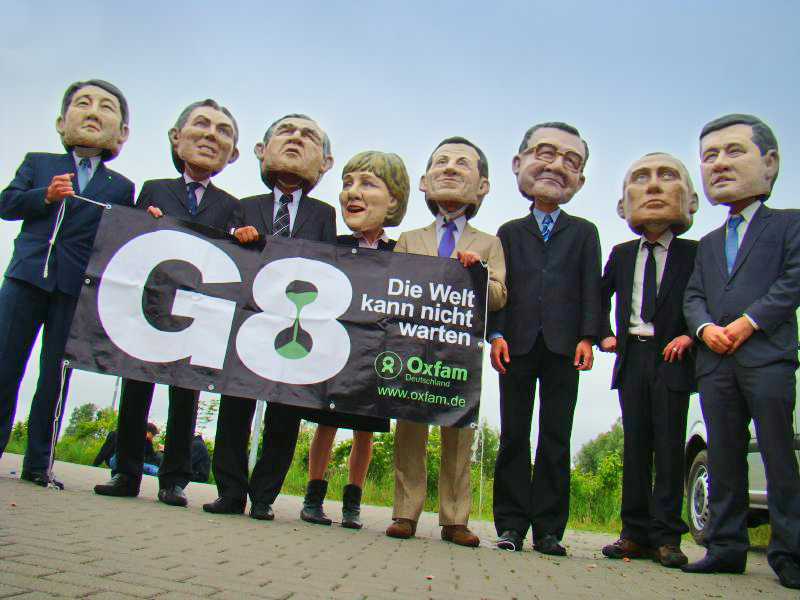
Campaign stunt before the summit by Oxfam International

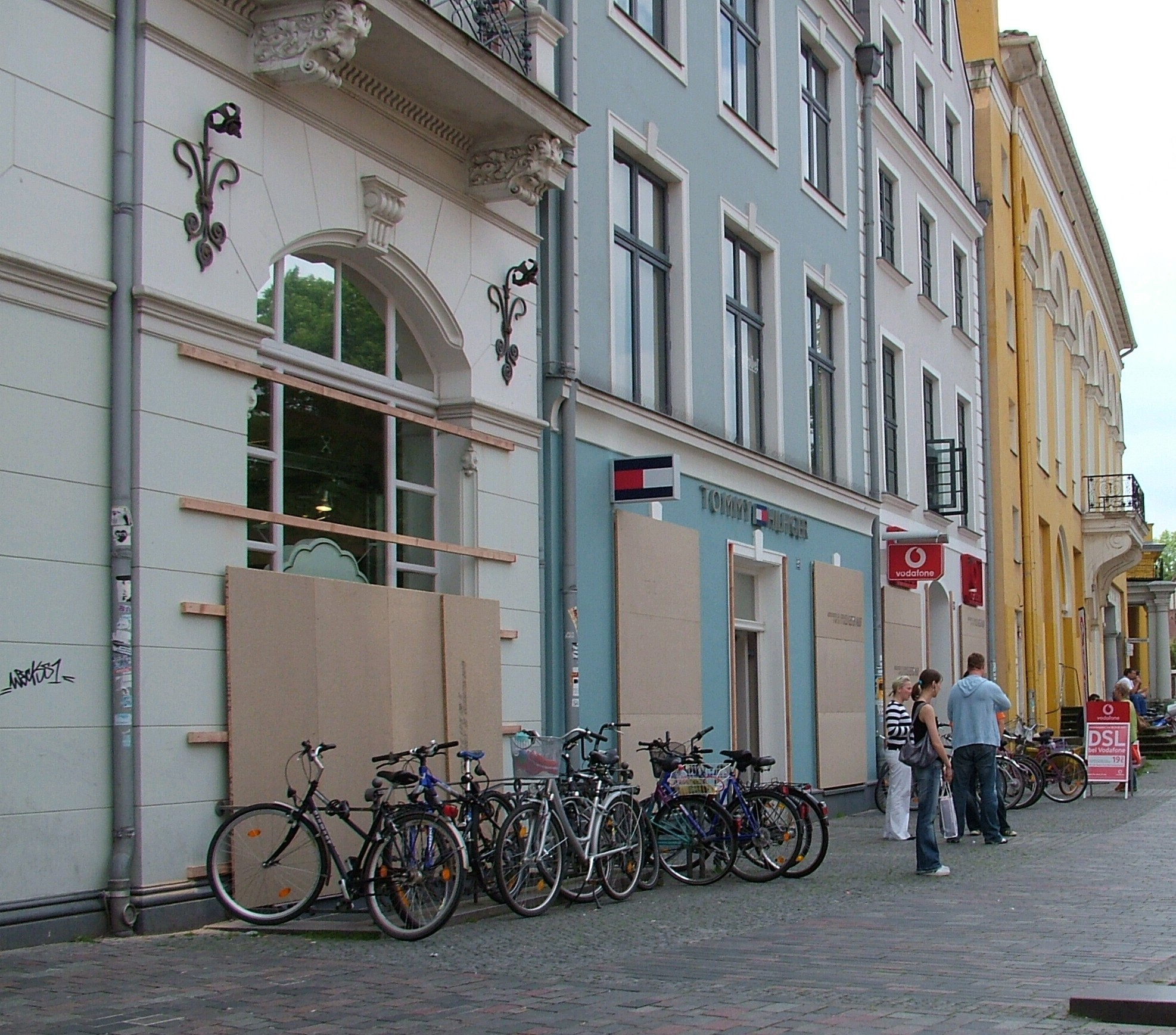
Expecting violent protests, shop owners in Rostock boarded up their shops.

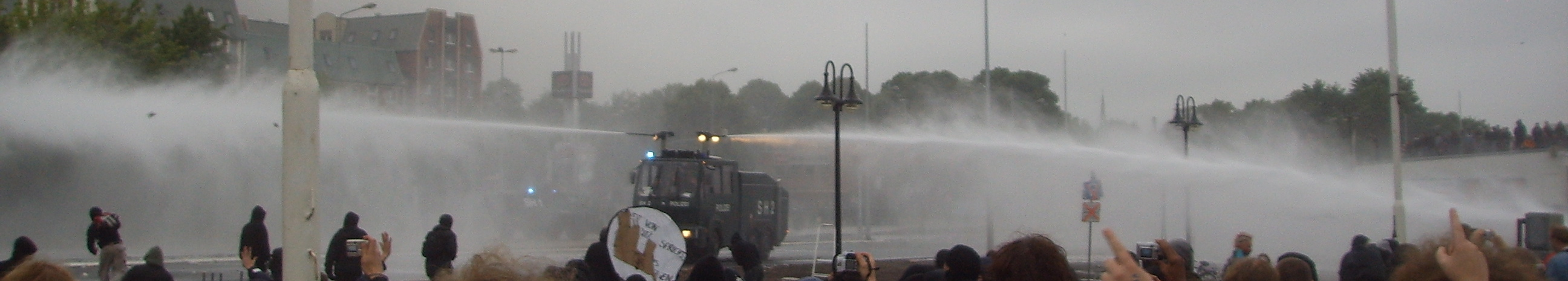
Watercannon in operation during the 2 June protests in Rostock

As with all recent G8 summits, the event drew large protests, part of the anti-globalization movement. The main demonstration took place 2 June 2007 in the nearby city of Rostock and was the starting event for a week of protests and blockades. Organizers spoke of up to 80,000 participants, while police put the figure at an estimated 25,000. Towards the end of the 2 June protest, violent clashes occurred between protesters and the police, essentially limited to a small area at the harbor. Initially, these drew wide media overstatement, with initial reports claiming nearly 1000 people injured (433 German police officers, 30–33 of them requiring hospitalisation, and 520 protesters, 20 requiring hospitalisation). Later, these figures were disputed. According to police estimates, 2,000 autonomists led the riots, setting fire to a total of 3 cars and setting up makeshift barricades; many peaceful protesters fled the action and ensuing police response in panic. Over 1,000 protesters were detained, and nine of them were tried and condemned during the summit. Hundreds were expelled. According to the European Democratic Lawyers NGO:

The evidence collected in this manner was absolutely inconsistent and as previously noted everybody detained was released after brief periods of time. In fact it all amounts to an illegal system of mass-indexing and psychological terrorism. The police were aware that the judicial authority would not have confirmed these arrests but proceeded equally with a different objective. The aim was not to arrest presumed offenders but the indexing of a great number of demonstrators, the psychological intimidation of the protesters and the creation of false records to be used in other occasions.

A protest also occurred on 2 June 2007 on the river bank opposite the Houses of Parliament in London, principally a reminder of the G8's previous (and, as the protestors saw them, unfulfilled) promises on debt relief, entitled "G8 – The World Can't Wait" and "Wake Up To Poverty". It was a static protest, with small marches converging on in from Lambeth Park and Methodist Central Hall, on a route starting at the foot of Victoria Tower, along the riverbank of Victoria Tower Gardens, the north side of Lambeth Bridge, and the southern riverbank opposite Parliament as far as (but not including) Westminster Bridge. This principally involved the protesters setting off alarm clocks at 2 pm as a "wakeup call" to the G8, and passed without incident.

== Accomplishments ==
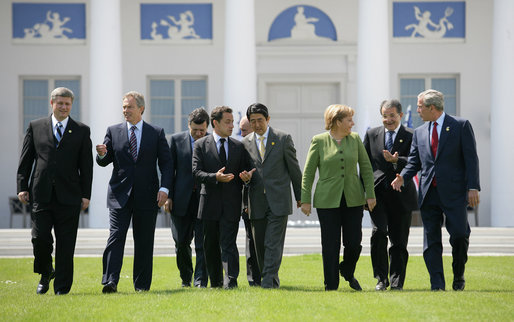
G8 "family photo" at the Heiligendamm summit. Left to right: Prime Minister Stephen Harper of Canada; Prime Minister Tony Blair of the United Kingdom; José Manuel Durão Barroso, President of the European Commission; President Nicolas Sarkozy of France; President Vladimir Putin of Russia; Prime Minister Shinzo Abe of Japan; Chancellor Angela Merkel of Germany; Prime Minister Romano Prodi of Italy, and President George W. Bush of the United States

The G8 summit is an international event which is observed and reported by news media, but the G8's continuing relevance after more than 30 years is somewhat unclear. More than one analyst suggests that a G8 summit is not the place to flesh out the details of any difficult or controversial policy issue in the context of a three-day event. Rather, the meeting offers an opportunity to bring a range of complex and sometimes inter-related issues. The G8 summit brings leaders together "not so they can dream up quick fixes, but to talk and think about them together."

=== Global warming ===
In a non-binding communiqué issued on Thursday 7 June, it was announced that the G8 nations would 'aim to at least halve global CO_{2} emissions by 2050'. The details which would enable this salutatory goal to be achieved were left to be negotiated.

It was anticipated that the G8 Environment ministers would work together within the United Nations Framework Convention on Climate Change in a process that would also include the major emerging economies. Groups of countries would also be able to reach additional agreements on achieving the goal outside and in parallel with the United Nations process.

The G8 also announced their desire to use the proceeds from the auction of emission rights and other financial tools to support climate protection projects in developing countries.

The agreement was welcomed by British Prime Minister Tony Blair as 'a major, major step forward'. French President Nicolas Sarkozy would have preferred a binding figure for emissions reduction to have been set. This was apparently blocked by US President George W. Bush until the other major greenhouse gas emitting countries, like India and China, make similar commitments.

=== Missile defence system ===
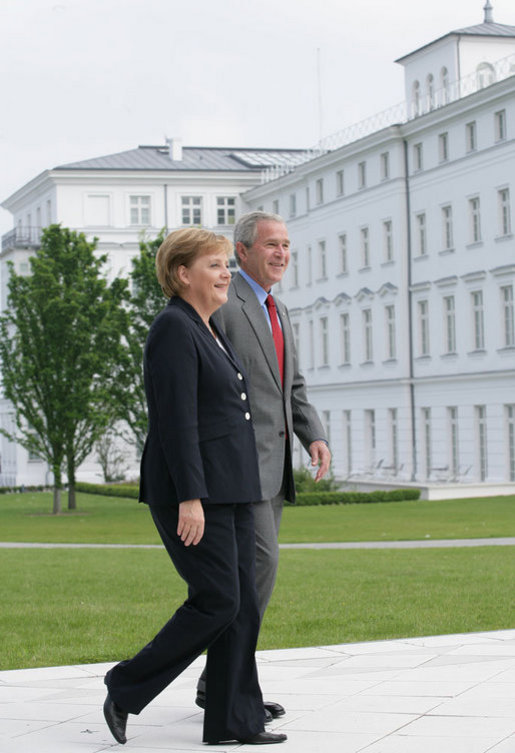
US president George W. Bush and German chancellor Angela Merkel at the summit.

En route to the summit, Bush attempted to assuage Russian concerns over US plans to construct a missile defense complex in Poland and the Czech Republic with remarks appearing to invite Russian participation in the project. At the summit, Russian President Vladimir Putin responded by suggesting that the radar installments for the proposed missile defence system be placed in Azerbaijan. Bush, in turn, responded by describing Putin's ideas as "an interesting suggestion".

=== G8+5 institutionalisation ===
Chancellor Angela Merkel announced the establishment of the "Heiligendamm Process" through which the full institutionalisation of the permanent dialogue between the G8 countries and the 5 greatest emerging economies will be implemented.

This process puts an end to the enlargement debate of the G8 into a hypothetical G9, G11, etc. since Merkel declared "The objective is the cohesion of all these countries into a single group which will be called G8+5".

=== Infrastructure Consortium for Africa ===
The Infrastructure Consortium for Africa (ICA) was established at the 31st G8 summit at Gleneagles, Scotland in the United Kingdom in 2005. Since that time, the ICA's annual meeting is traditionally hosted by the country holding the Presidency of the G8—in Russia in 2007.

=== Controversial video of Sarkozy ===
Contrary to French TV, the Belgian TV network diffused a video of Sarkozy who appeared to be drunk after a chat with Putin.

=== Possible poisoning of American delegation ===
In her written memoirs, former US First Lady Laura Bush suggests that members of the United States delegation, including President and Mrs. Bush, may have been poisoned while at the summit. Later reports suggested the President and First Lady may have been victims of Havana syndrome.

== Location ==
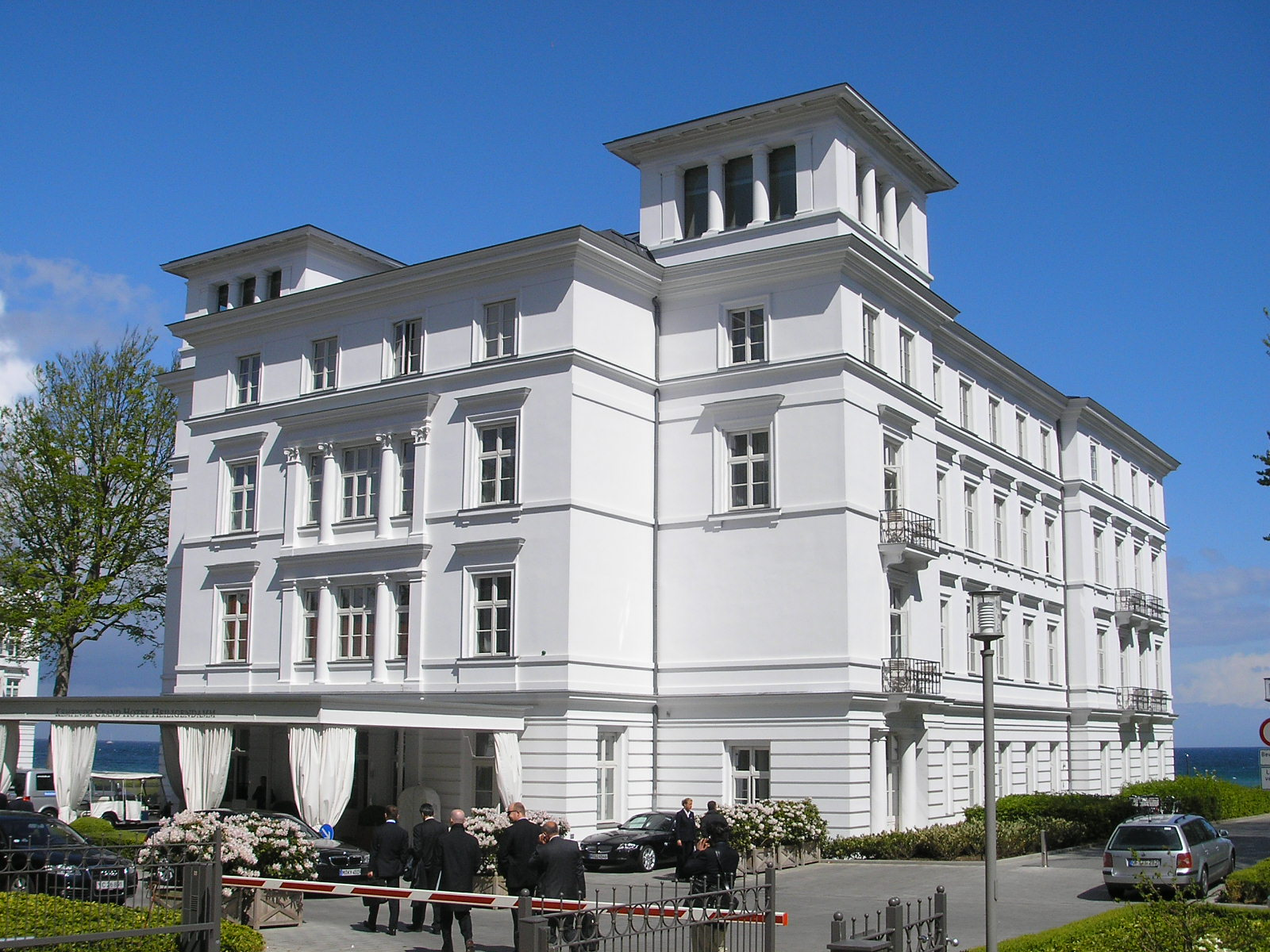
Kempinski Grand Hotel Heiligendamm

Heiligendamm is situated on the Baltic near the city Rostock, and is the oldest seaside resort in Germany, developed in 1793 as the seaside meeting place of nobility and high society close to Frederick Francis I, Duke of Mecklenburg. It was selected as the location for the G8 summit due to its isolated location, in anticipation of protests such as those in Gleneagles and St Petersburg. The summit site was fenced off by 12 km long barrier, costing an approximate EUR 12.4 million.

Heiligendamm used to be the summer getaway of the Russian imperial family, who were related to the Dukes of Mecklenburg. For the occasion of the G8 summit, a former summer residence of the imperial family was demolished to make space for a media centre, however it was reconstructed in 2010.

== Business opportunity ==
For some, the G8 summit became a profit-generating event; as for example, the official G8 Summit magazines which have been published under the auspices of the host nations for distribution to all attendees since 1998.

Security precautions included a $17 million, 8-foot-high, 7.5-mile-long fence topped with barbed and razor wire, which encompassed the landward access to the resort; but no protests were reported from the suppliers of the fencing materials.

== Gallery of participating leaders ==
=== Core G8 participants ===
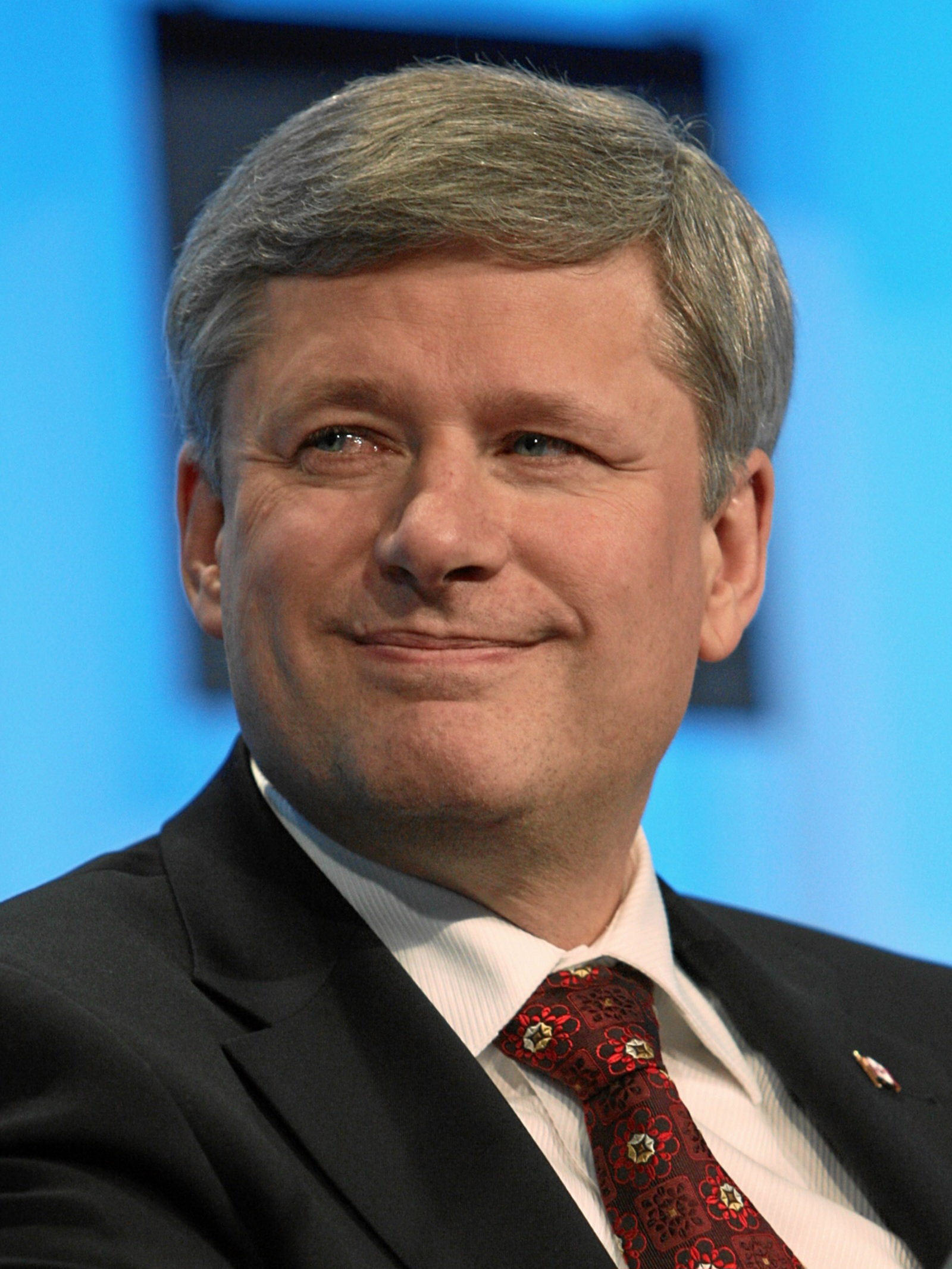
(Canada) Canada
Stephen Harper,
Prime Minister

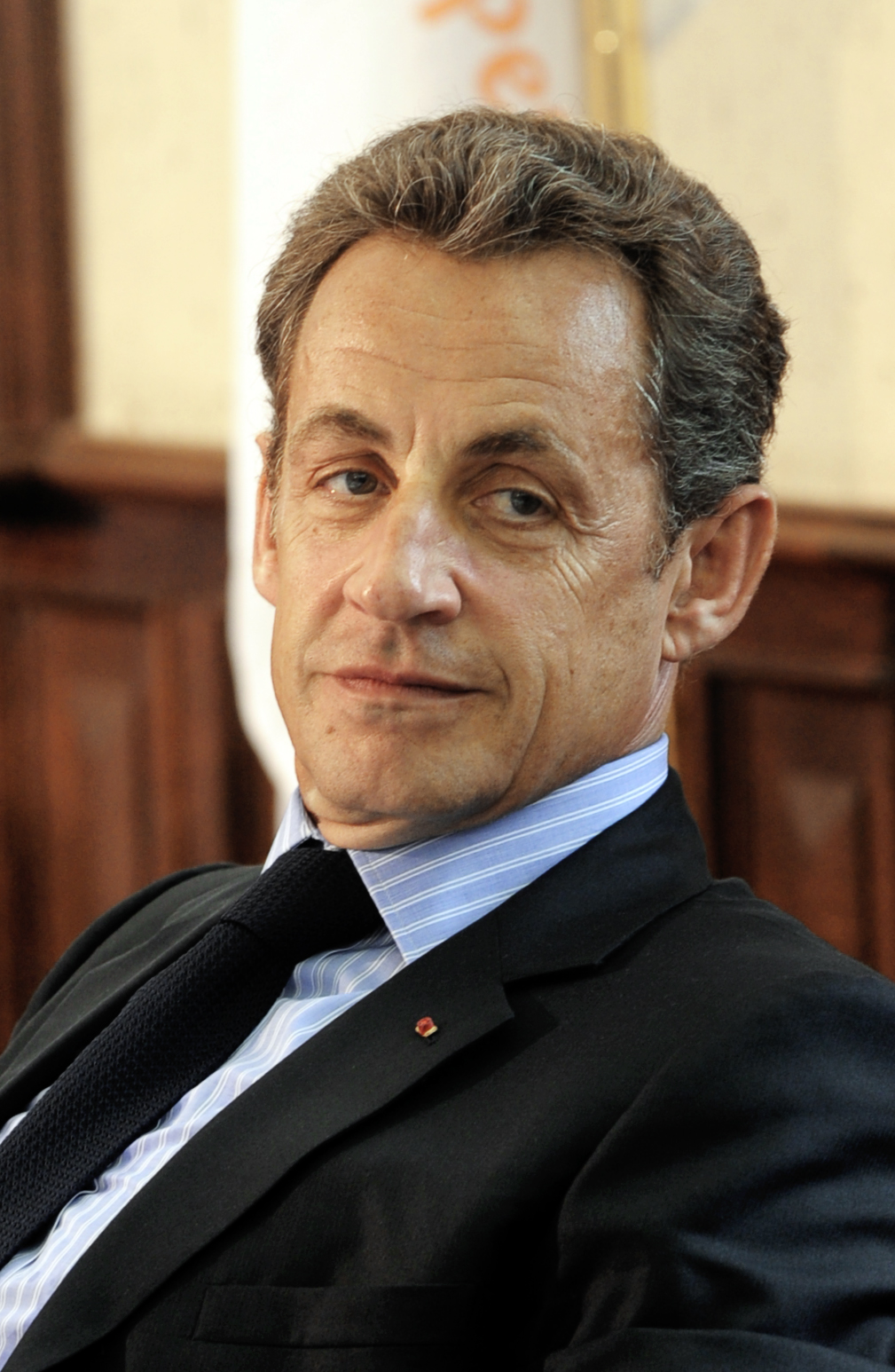
(France) France
Nicolas Sarkozy,
President

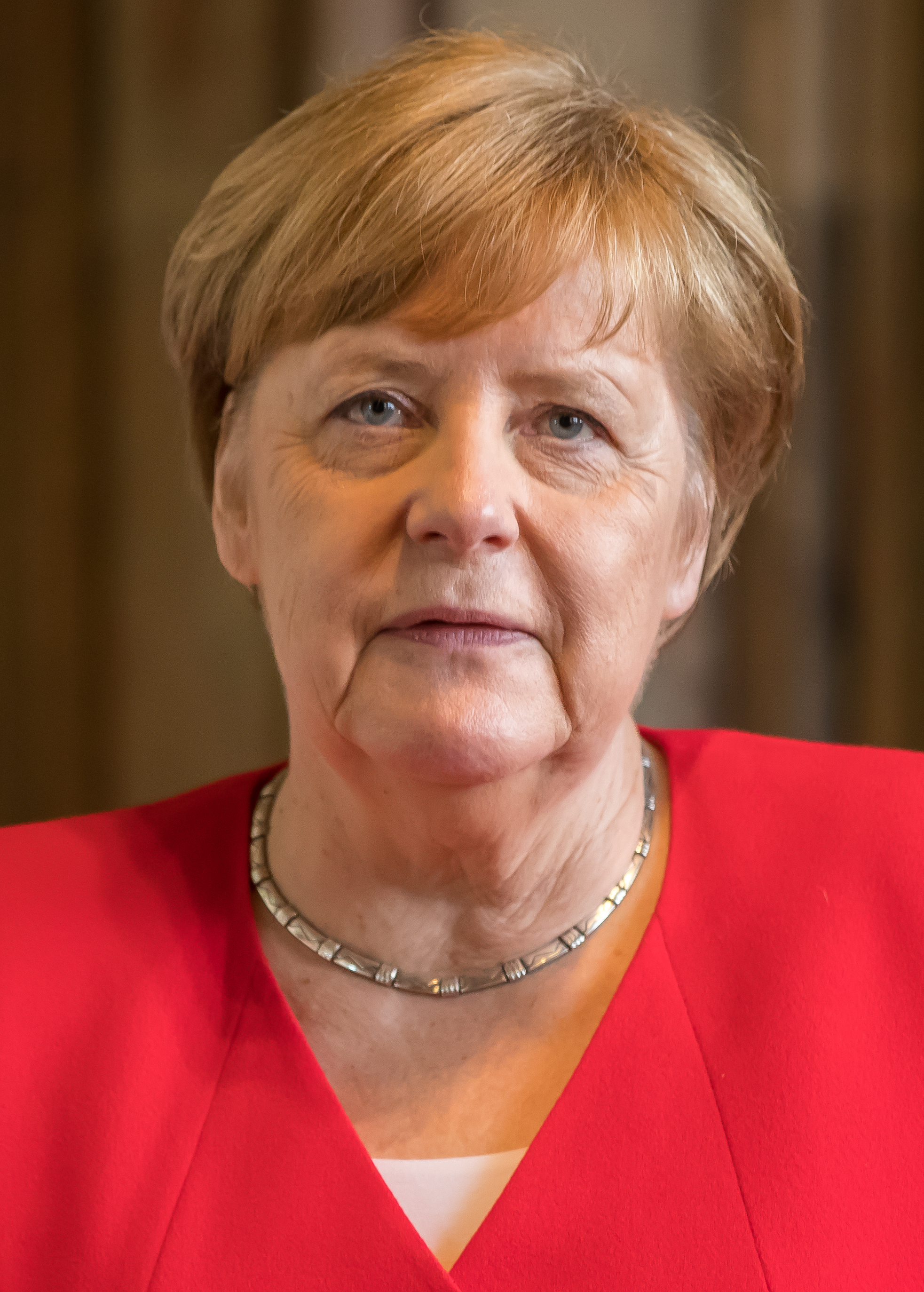
(Germany) Germany
Angela Merkel,
Chancellor (Host)

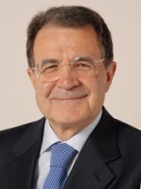
(Italy) Italy
Romano Prodi,
Prime Minister

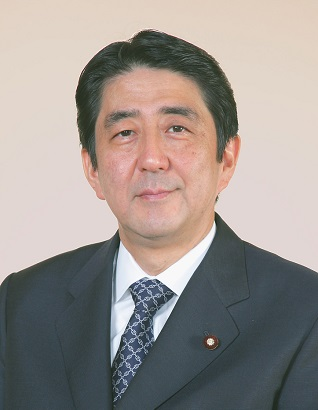
(Japan) Japan
Shinzō Abe,
Prime Minister

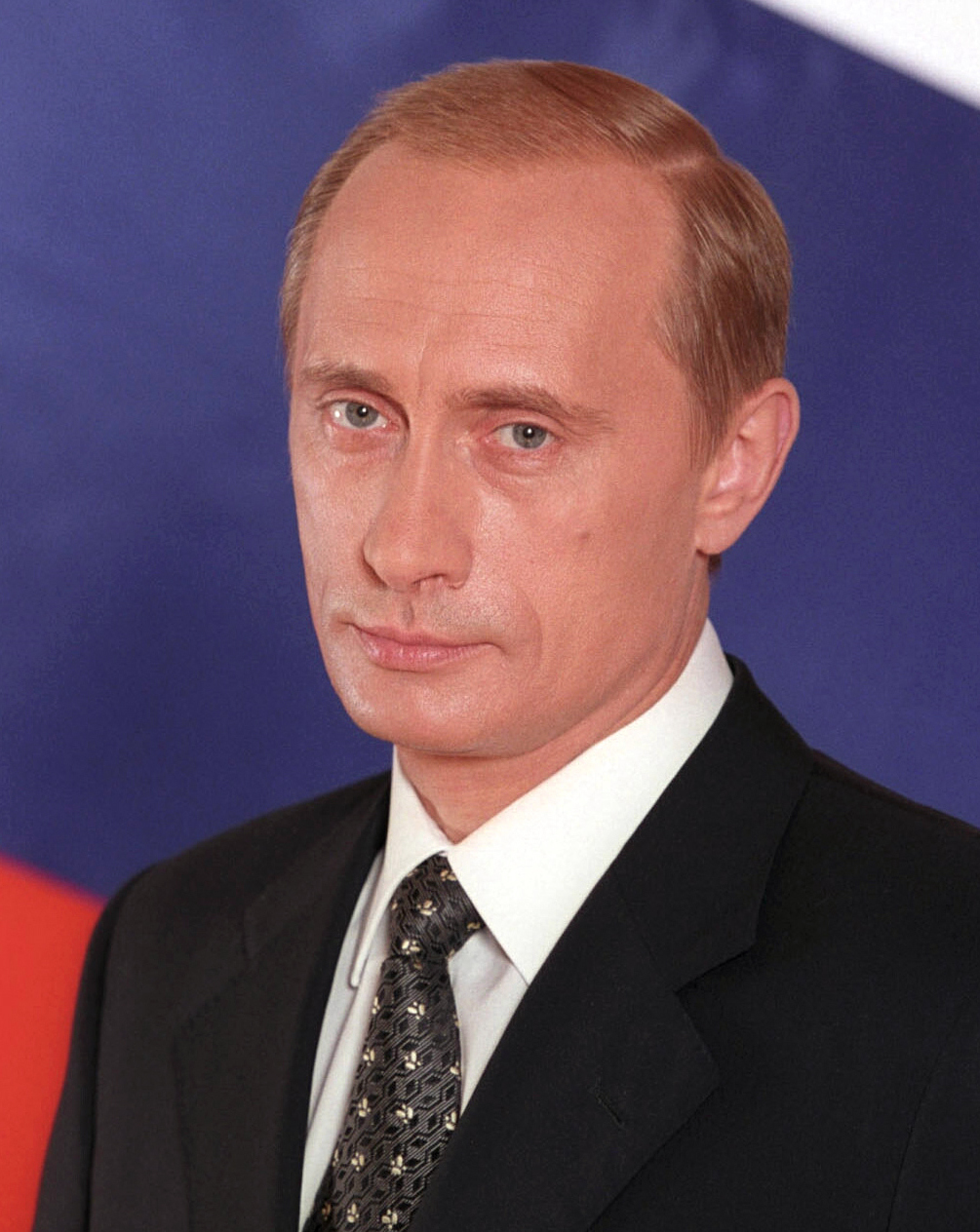
(Russia) Russia
Vladimir Putin,
President

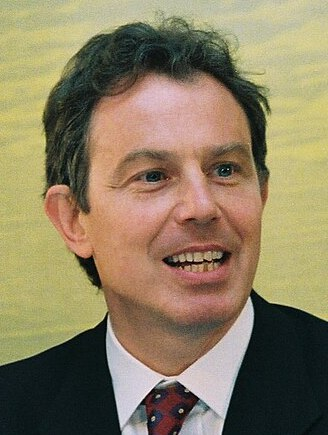
(United Kingdom) United Kingdom
Tony Blair,
Prime Minister

United States
George W. Bush,
President
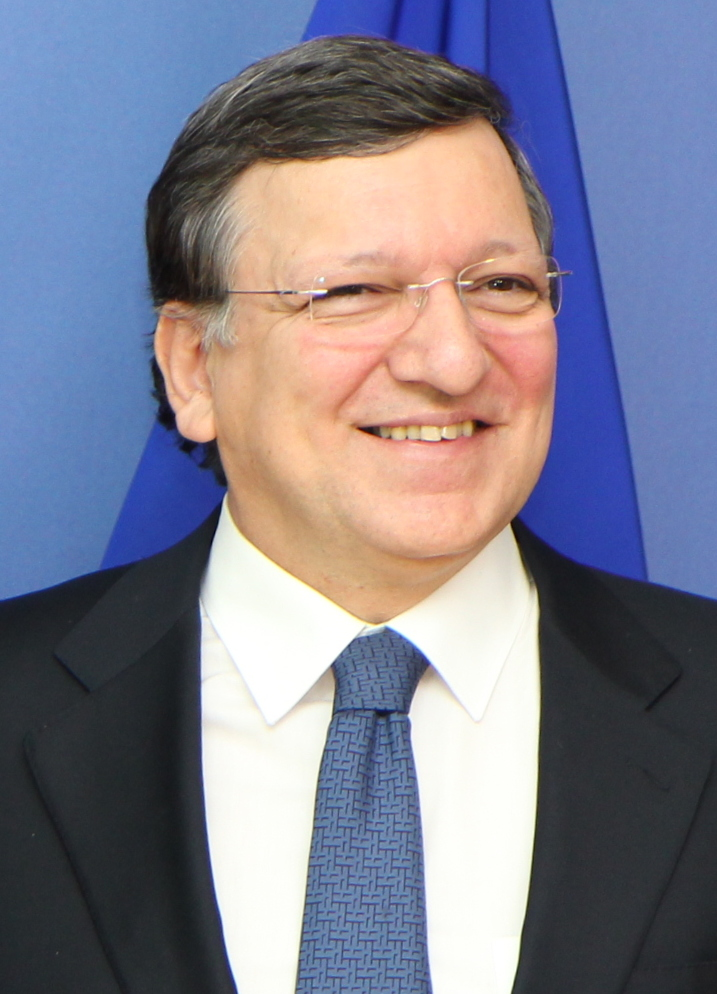
(European Union) European Union
Jose Manuel Barroso, Commission President

== See also ==
- Intergovernmental Panel on Climate Change
- Kyoto Protocol

== General references ==
- Iain McLean; Alistair McMillan (2009). The concise Oxford dictionary of politics. Oxford University Press, USA. ISBN 978-0-19-920780-0.
- Bob Reinalda (1998). Autonomous policy making by international organizations. Psychology Press. ISBN 978-0-415-16486-3.
