= Heiligendamm =

German seaside resort

- Ortsteil of Bad Doberan
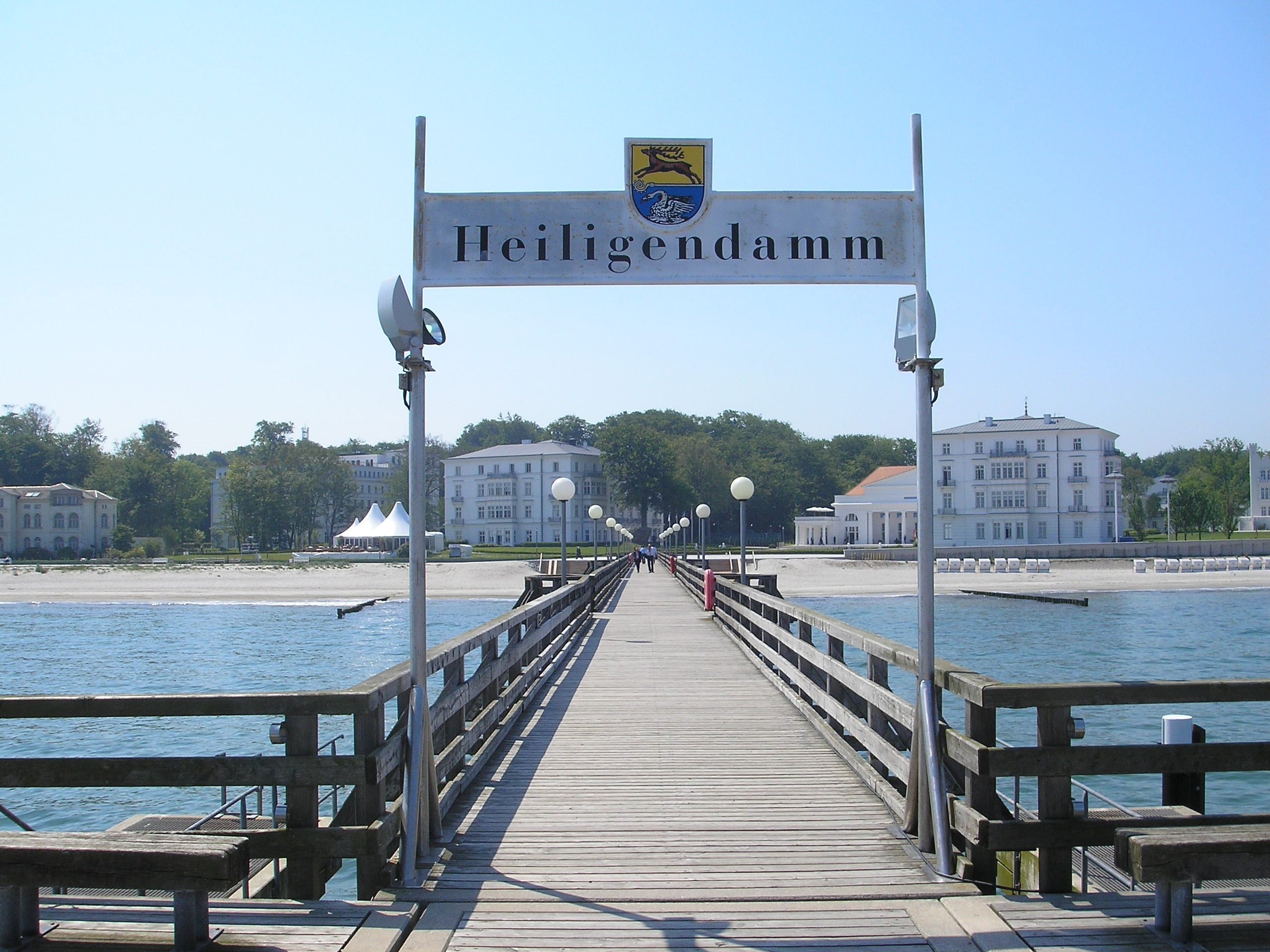
- Seebrücke (pier) towards Heiligendamm spa
- Interactive map of Heiligendamm
- Location within Germany Location within Mecklenburg-Vorpommern
- Coordinates: 54°09′00″N 11°50′00″E
- Country: Germany
- State: Mecklenburg-Vorpommern
- District: Rostock
- Town: Bad Doberan
- Founded: 1793
- Elevation: 3 m (9.8 ft)

Population (2020)
  - Total: 175
- Time zone: UTC+01:00 (CET)
  - Summer (DST): UTC+02:00 (CEST)
- Postal codes: 18209
- Dialling codes: 038203
- Vehicle registration: LRO
- Website: Official website

Heiligendamm (German pronunciation: [ˈhaɪ̯lɪɡn̩ˌdam]) is a German seaside resort founded in 1793.

It is the oldest seaside spa in continental Europe. Heiligendamm is part of the town Bad Doberan in the state of Mecklenburg-Vorpommern and historically belongs to Mecklenburg.

The cluster of resort architecture mansions and spa buildings at the seafront are reminders of the glory days when this part of the Baltic Sea was one of the playgrounds of Europe's aristocracy. Due to the classicist white buildings lining the beach promenade, the town is also known as the "White Pearl" (German: Weiße Perle) or the "White Town by the Sea" (German: Die weiße Stadt am Meer).

Today, the area by the sea is occupied by a five-star hotel, the Grand Hotel Heiligendamm. A narrow-gauge steam railway, known as the "Molli", links Heiligendamm with Kühlungsborn and Bad Doberan.

== History ==
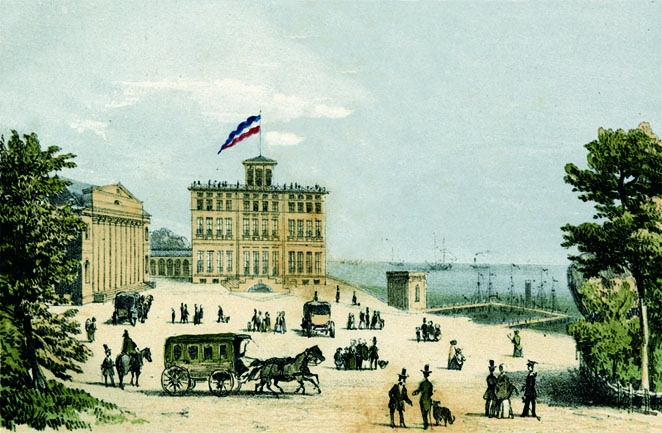
Established in 1793, Heiligendamm is the oldest seaside resort in continental Europe.

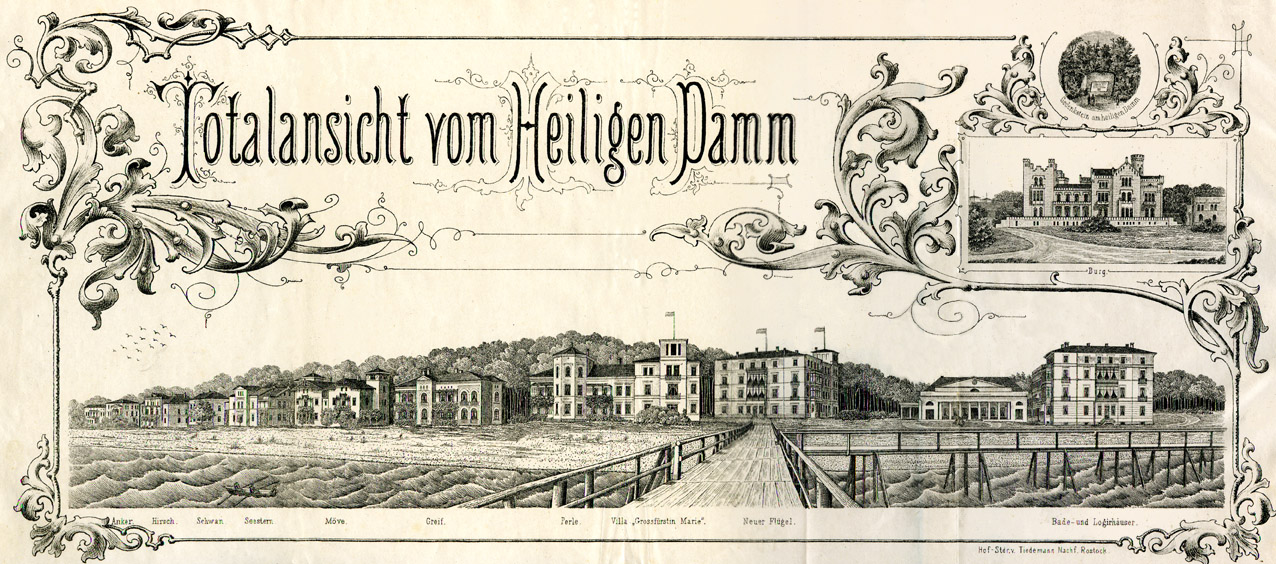
Panorama of Heiligendamm, 1887

Heiligendamm was developed as an elegant meeting place for the nobility and high society. Among its most prominent guests were the German Emperors.

Its founder and first guest in 1793 was the Grand Duke of Mecklenburg Friedrich Franz I; he made the resort fashionable. Between 1793 and 1870, Johann Christoph, Heinrich von Seydwitz, Carl Theodor Severin, and Gustav Adolph Demmler created a veritable Gesamtkunstwerk for bathing and lodging. Heiligendamm was always regarded as the most elegant seaside resort in Germany. Nobility from throughout Europe used it as a summer getaway well into the 20th century.

After the Second World War, the buildings of Heiligendamm were used as sanatoria and recovery ward. When Mecklenburg became part of the communist GDR, some of Heiligendamm's famous buildings were demolished and replaced by more utilitarian structures. After the German reunification in 1989/1990, a group of investors bought most of the buildings and undertook a major programme of refurbishment.

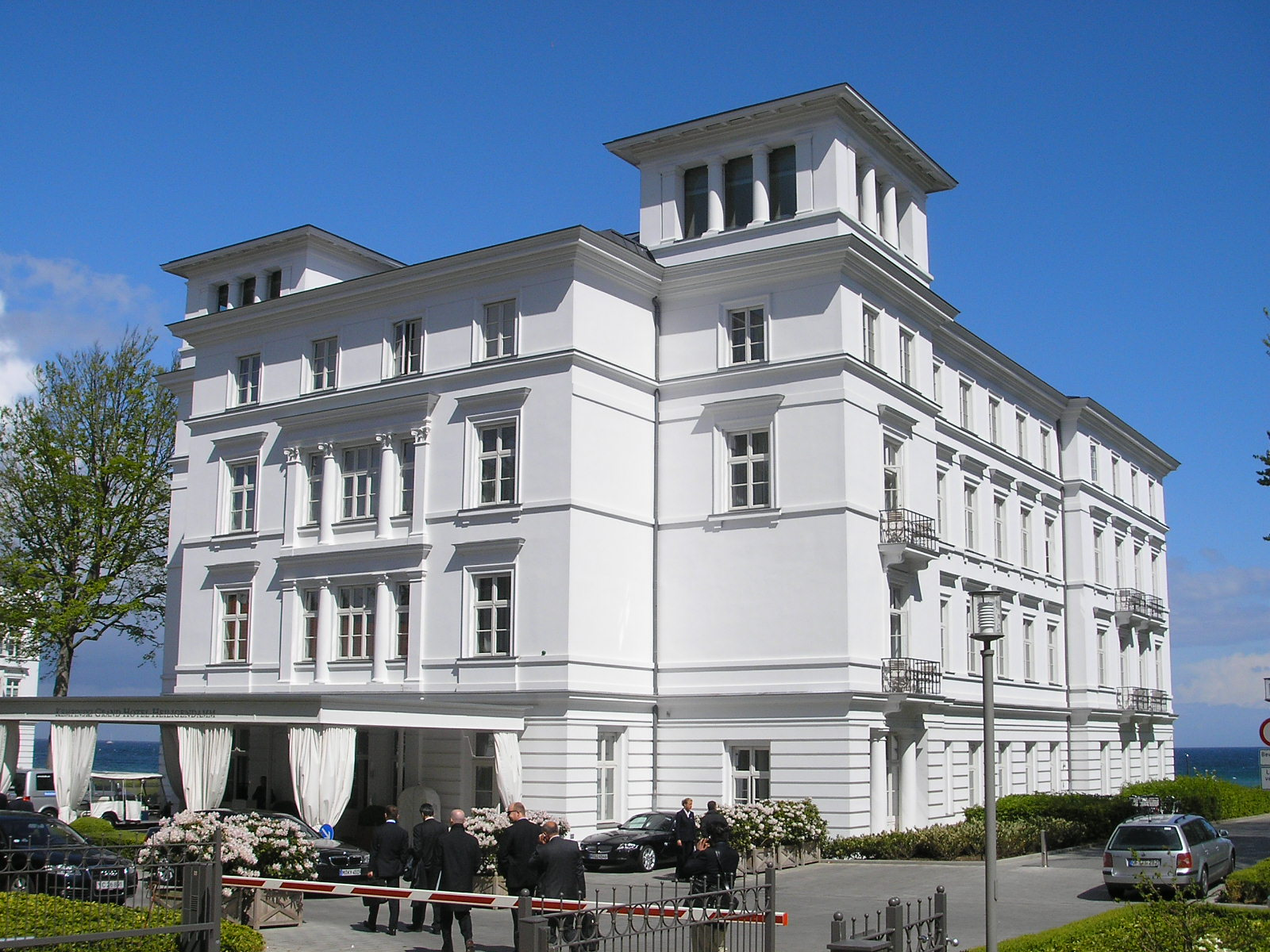
The Grand Hotel

A new company, the Kempinski Grand Hotel, opened in spring of 2003 – it used six historical buildings including the historical Kurhaus at the beach of Heiligendamm. The development has led to some conflict with residents, as main streets and cycle paths have been removed or rerouted. Also again a famous building of the ensemble was demolished. The mansion next to the Grand Hotel was reconstructed until 2011, though. Renovations of other mansions are undergoing or planned.

On July 13, 2006, United States President George W. Bush stayed at Heiligendamm while on a state visit to see German Chancellor Angela Merkel in Stralsund.

On June 6 to 8, 2007, Heiligendamm's Grand Hotel hosted the 33rd summit of G8 leaders. During this time, thousands of anticapitalist activists from around the world blocked the roads to Heiligendamm and an estimated 25,000 anti-globalization protesters demonstrated in nearby Rostock.

In July 2013, the Grand Hotel Heiligendamm was bought by Hannover-based accountant Paul Morzynski, who intends to carefully extend and reorganize the hotel.

== Sights ==
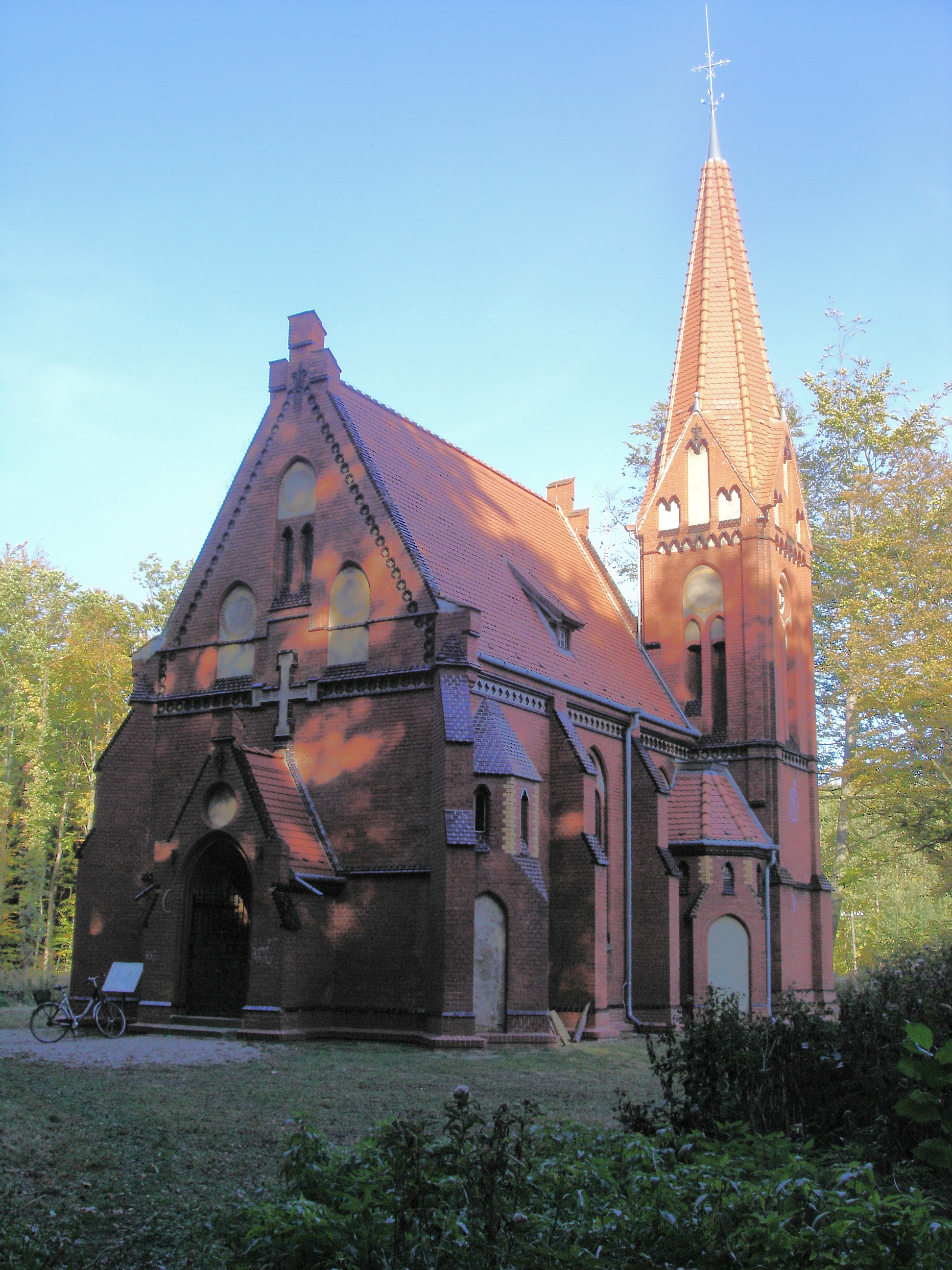
Protestant forest church of 1904

The narrow gauge railway known as Bäderbahn Molli ("Molli Resort Railway") runs through Heiligendamm from Kühlungsborn to Bad Doberan. The line between Bad Doberan and Heiligendamm was built in 1886. The Protestant Forest Church (Evangelische Waldkirche) was renovated after die Wende, the Catholic Church of the Sacred Heart (Herz-Jesu-Kapelle) is close by.

Heiligendamm also has a 200-metre-long pier into the Baltic Sea that allows great views of the White Pearl Mansions at the beach.

== Images ==
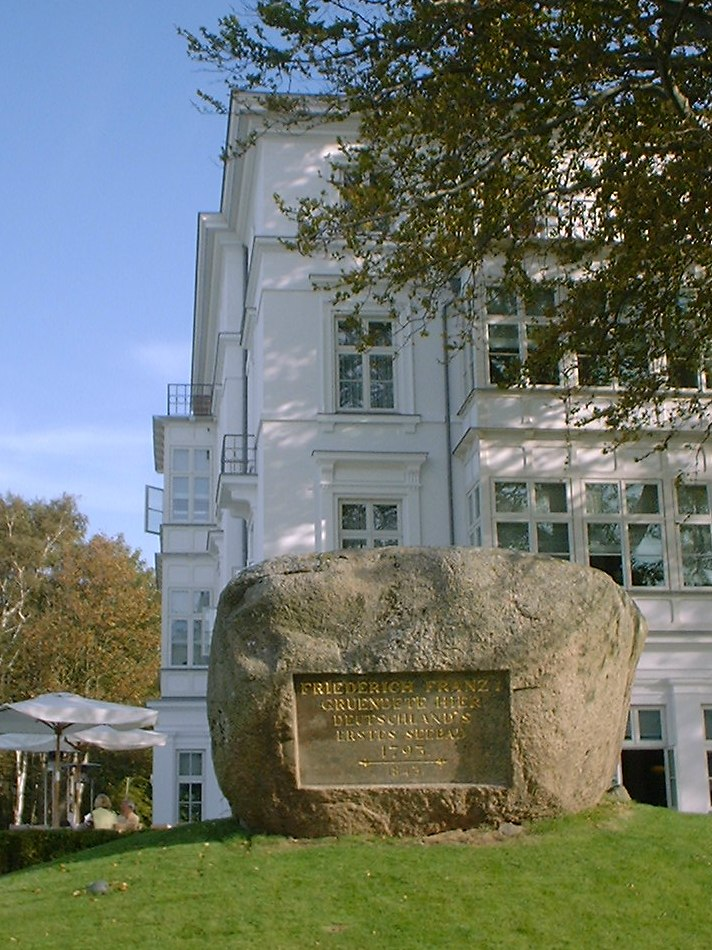
Foundation memorial stone

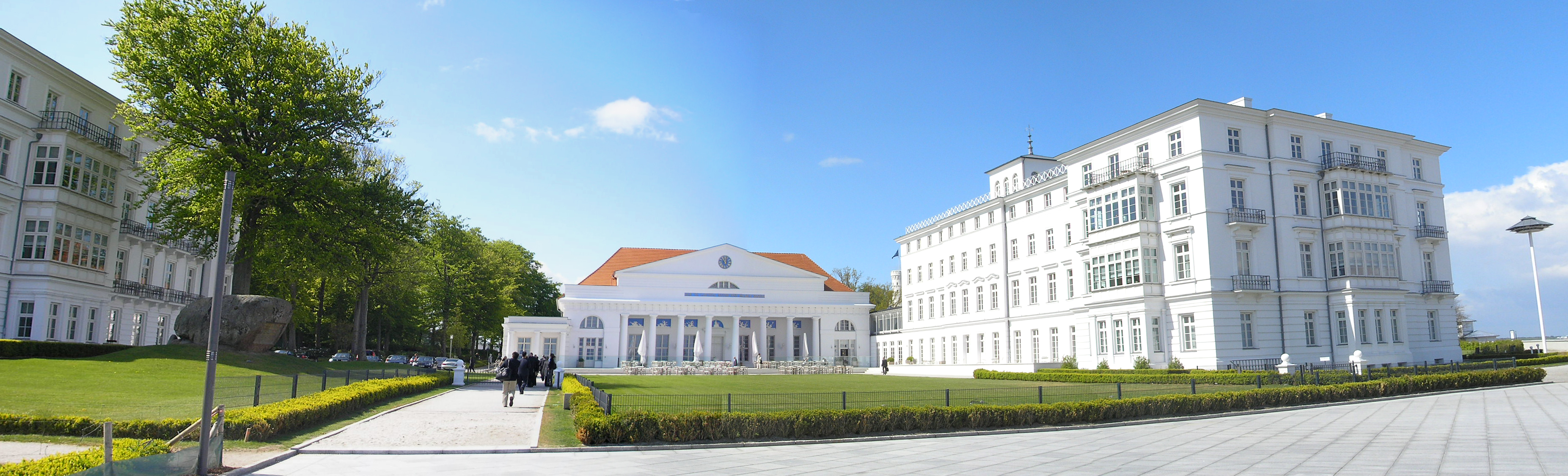
The Kurhaus, earliest example of resort architecture, part of the Grand Hotel Heiligendamm

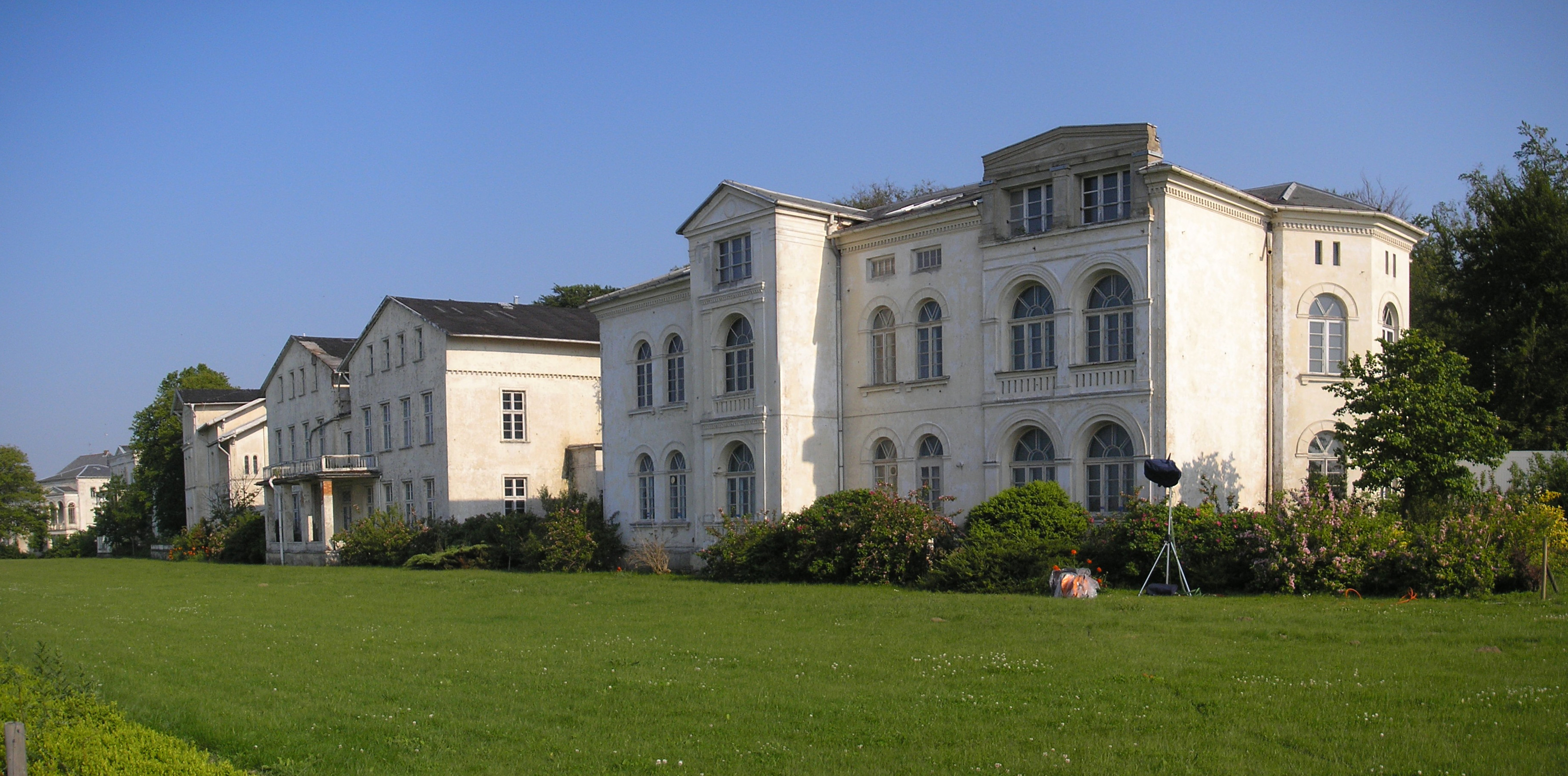
Beach villas at Heiligendamm, the so-called Perlenkette.

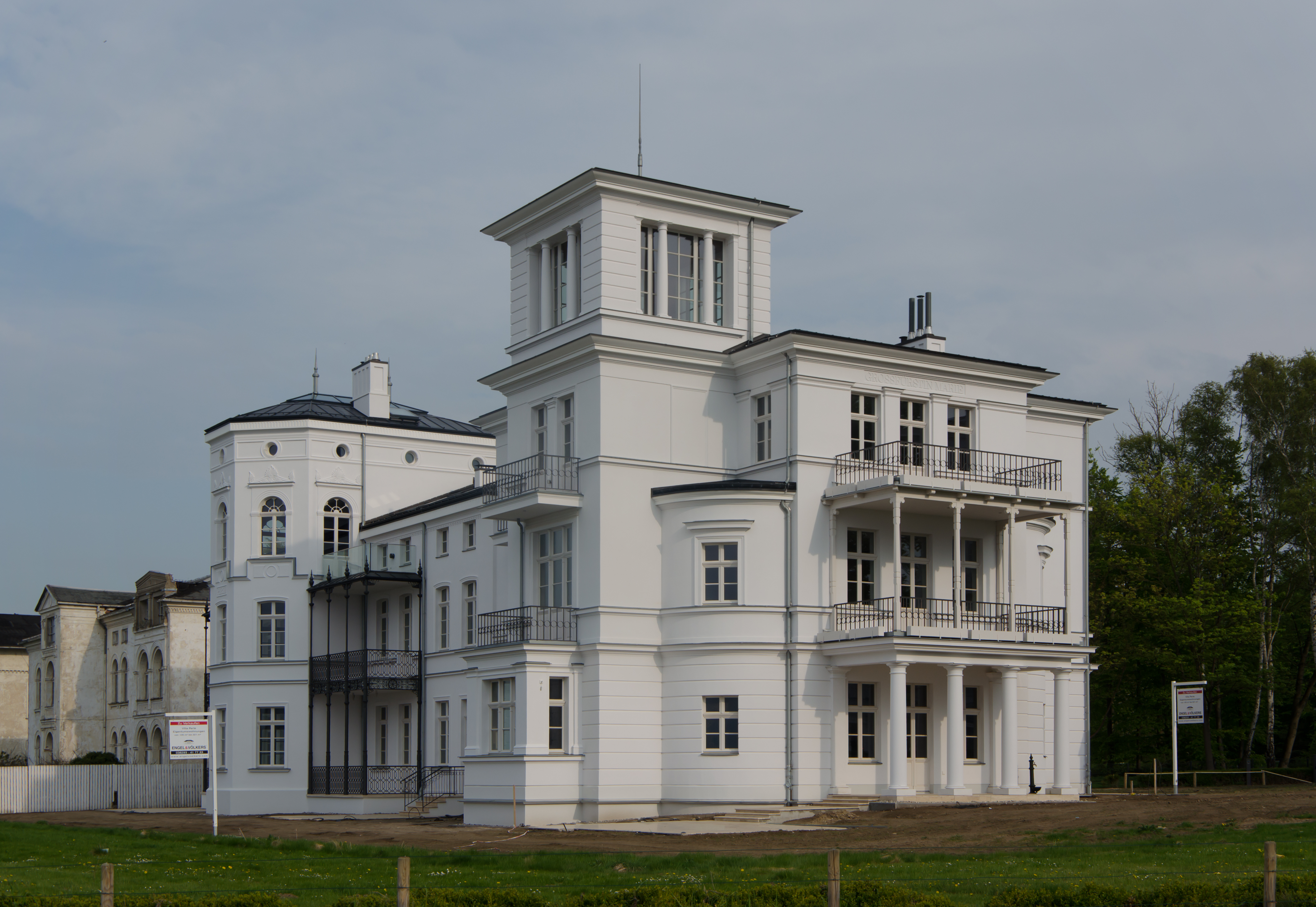
Reconstructed Villa Perle in 2013 (formerly demolished in 2007 for the G8 summit)

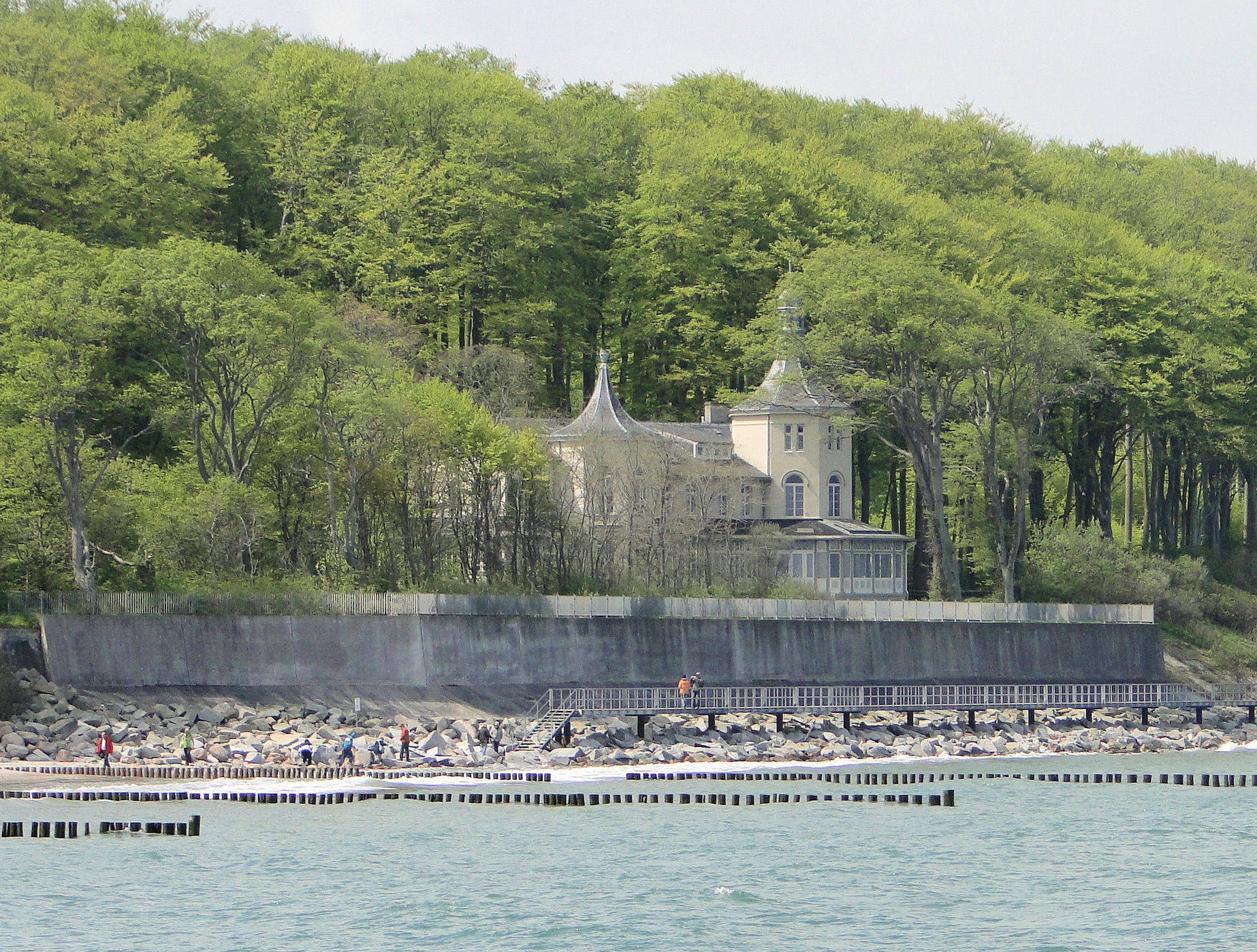
Alexandrinen-Cottage, a noble mansion next to the Grand Hotel

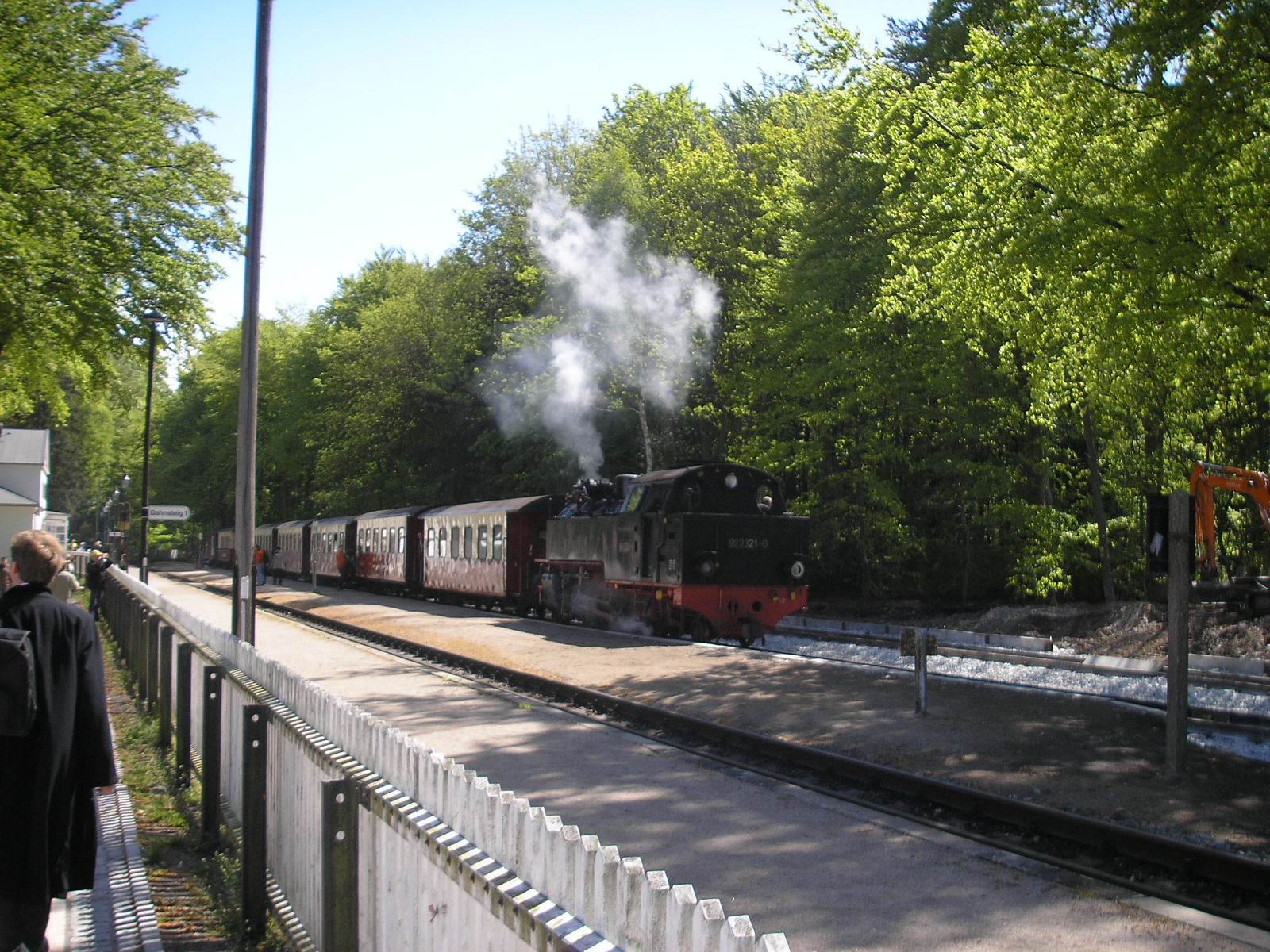
The narrow gauge line Bäderbahn Molli in Heiligendamm station

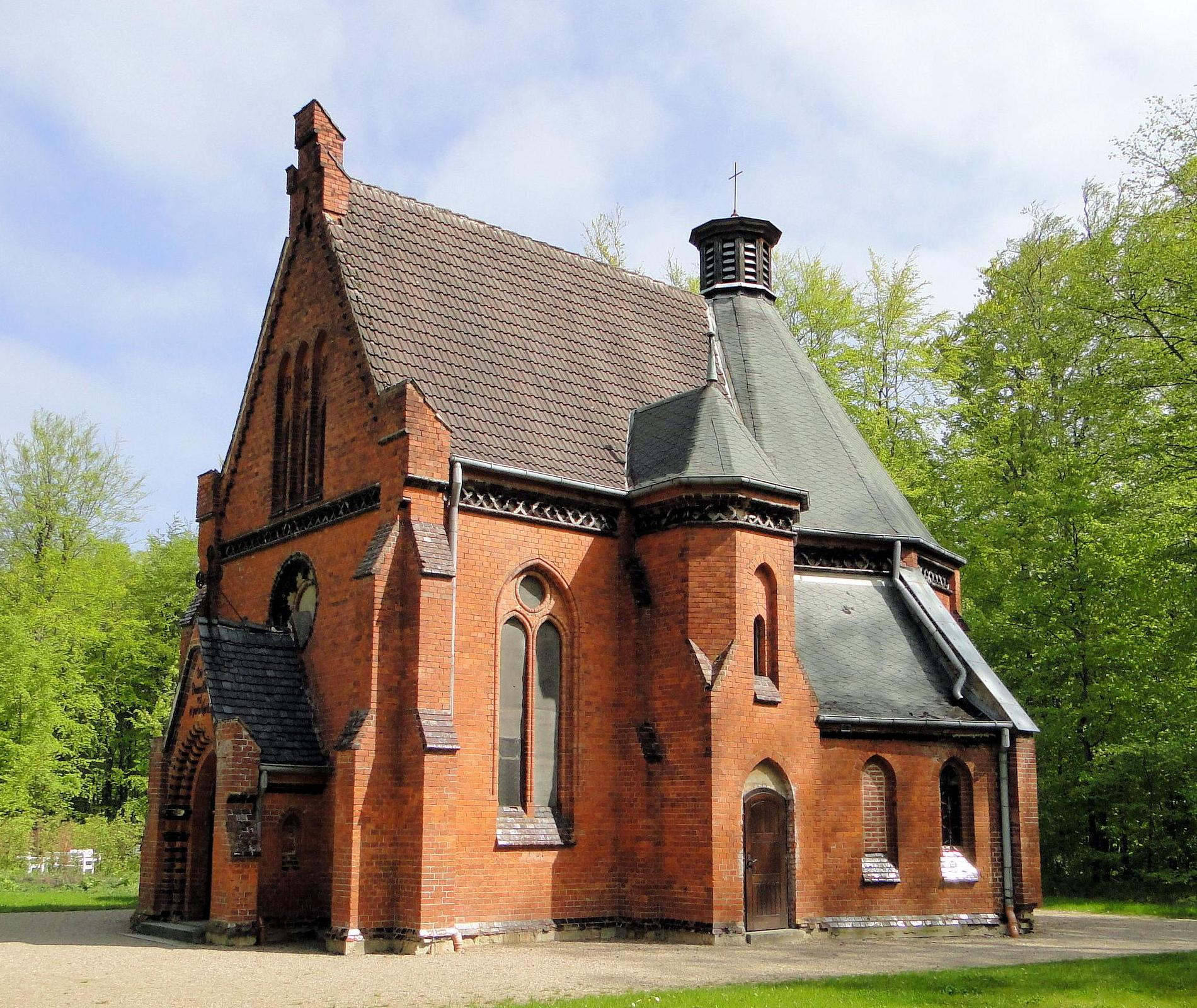
Catholic forest chapel of 1888

== Literature ==
in English language

- Charles James Apperley: "Nimrods German Tour" – a travel through northern Germany, especially to Heiligendamm in 1828. Publishing company: Godewind Verlag, Germany 2006. ISBN 978-3-939198-70-3

in German language

- Hans Thielcke: Die Bauten des Seebades Doberan - Heiligendamm um 1800 und Ihr Baumeister Severin. Godewind Verlag, 2004 ISBN 978-3-938347-90-4. (Reprint d. Originalausgabe von 1917)
- Friedrich Compart: Geschichte des Klosters Doberan. Godewind Verlag, 2004. ISBN 978-3-938347-07-2. (Reprint der Originalausgabe von 1872)
- Heinrich Hesse: Die Geschichte von Doberan-Heiligendamm. Godewind Verlag, Wismar 2004, ISBN 978-3-938347-09-6. (Bearbeitete Neuauflage der Originalausgabe von 1838)
- Adolf Nizze: Doberan-Heiligendamm: Geschichte des ersten deutschen Seebades. Godewind Verlag, Wismar 2004, ISBN 978-3-938347-23-2. (Bearbeitete Neuauflage der Originalausgabe von 1823)
- Die Reise eines Gesunden in die Seebäder Swinemünde, Putbus und Doberan. Godewind Verlag, Wismar 2005, ISBN 978-3-938347-73-7. (Bearbeitete Neuauflage der Originalausgabe von 1823)
- Hans-Jürgen Herbst: Kalender 2007, Doberan & Heiligendamm, erstes deutsches Seebad. Godewind Verlag, 2007, ISBN 978-3-938347-57-7.
- Samuel G. Vogel: Allgemeine Baderegeln zum Gebrauche für Badelustige überhaupt und diejenigen insbesondere, welche sich des Seebades in Doberan bedienen. Godewind Verlag, 2004, ISBN 978-3-938347-88-1. (Bearbeitete Neuauflage der Originalausgabe von 1817)

== See also ==
- List of G8 summit resorts
- Zingst
