= Rein Lang =

Estonian politician (born 1957)

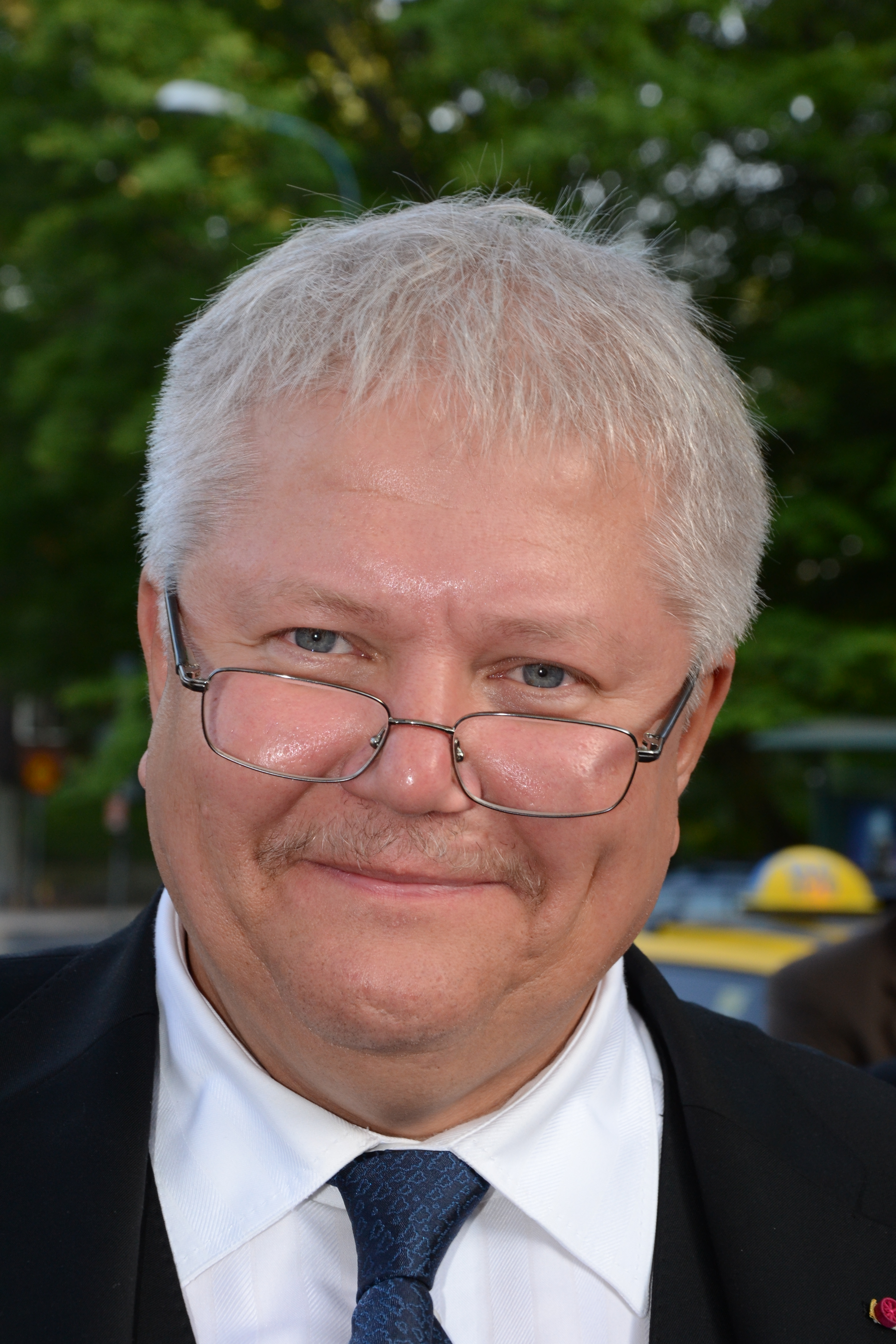
- Rein Lang in 2011.

Minister of Culture of Estonia
- In office 6 April 2011 – 4 December 2013
- Prime Minister: Andrus Ansip
- Preceded by: Laine Jänes
- Succeeded by: Urve Tiidus

Minister of Justice of Estonia
- In office 12 April 2005 – 6 April 2011
- Prime Minister: Andrus Ansip
- Preceded by: Ken-Marti Vaher
- Succeeded by: Kristen Michal

Minister of Foreign Affairs of Estonia
- In office 21 February 2005 – 13 April 2005
- Prime Minister: Juhan Parts
- Preceded by: Kristiina Ojuland
- Succeeded by: Urmas Paet

Personal details
- Born: 4 July 1957 (age 68) Tartu, then part of Estonian SSR, Soviet Union
- Party: Reform Party

Rein Lang (born 4 July 1957) is an Estonian politician, a member of the Estonian Reform Party since 1995, and a diplomat. He was the Minister of Culture in Andrus Ansip's third cabinet until his resignation.

== Personal life ==
Lang was born in Tartu. His father was appointed to work at the Soviet Embassy in Helsinki; consequently, Rein Lang grew up partly in Finland, becoming a fluent speaker of Finnish. He has championed Finnish-Estonian relations. Lang received his elementary and high school education at Tallinn English College (then known as the 7th High School of Tallinn) and graduated cum laude from the University of Tartu in 1980, earning a degree in law.

Lang cohabits with Ulvi Kuusk, whom he met in 1979, and as of 2007 has one teenage daughter.

== Career ==
In the later years of the Soviet Union, starting in 1986, Lang worked in the entertainment business. He was a deputy director of the Linnahall and in 1989 became a deputy director of the club 'Muusik' (Estonian for 'Musician'). In 1990, he became CEO of AS Laulusillad (Estonian for Song Bridges), and from 1991–2001 served at various positions in AS Trio LSL along with Hans H. Luik, establishing and running the first politically independent radio station in post-Soviet Estonia, Radio Kuku. Over the next several years, Lang launched two more radio stations: Radio Uuno, a music-only radio station, and the Russian language Radio Tallinn (later renamed Radio 100). In 2002, Lang and Luik sold their radio interest to their then co-partner from the United States, Metromedia International Group Inc.

During his years at Radio Kuku, Lang regularly appeared on talk shows, gaining considerable reputation as a political commentator. His most popular programme, the weekly 'Midday Hour' (Estonian: Keskpäevatund), has become legendary, and a subject of a number of jokes mostly associated with Valdo Jahilo. 'Of the state of the state' (Estonian: Olukorrast riigis) was also popular.

Following his departure from the media business, Lang served as deputy mayor of Tallinn from 2001 to 2003 and was a member of Riigikogu from 2003 to 2005. He served as the Deputy Speaker of Riigikogu and chairman of its European Affairs Committee. In 2005, Lang was the Minister of Foreign Affairs for two months, from February to April. With the resignation of Juhan Parts, the prime minister at that time, a new cabinet was proposed by Andrus Ansip; there, Lang served as the Minister of Justice, a position he officially took when the new cabinet took an oath on 12 April 2005. As the Estonian Minister of Justice, Lang was involved in the Constitutional Pilsener project.

From 21 May 2009 to 4 June 2009 he was also the acting Minister of the Interior.

== Controversies ==
=== Press enemy of 2004 ===
In 2004, the Estonian Newspaper Association (Estonian: Eesti Ajalehtede Liit) labelled Lang the 'Year's Press Enemy'. The explanation provided in the press release cited Lang's snobbish attitude towards the press, exemplified by an email response in which Lang asked a county newspaper's correspondent to "not bother" him with any more requests for information. Lang has disputed this characterisation, and implied that Toomas Leito, leader of the Estonian Newspaper Association, was following a policy of "lynching Negroes".

=== Controversial "Delfi bill" ===
In autumn of 2005, Lang initiated a bill that would have allowed penalising web portals for anonymous comments left by their visitors. The bill, nicknamed the "Delfi bill" (Estonian: Delfi eelnõu) after the Estonian web portal Delfi.ee, which is commonly associated with offensive user comments, was widely criticised and ended up rejected by the Riigikogu. Among other concerns, critics commonly pointed out that Delfi belonged to a media concern competing with AS Trio LSL, and questioned the minister's neutrality. The bill became law in June 2006.

The first lawsuit involving the Delfi bill was brought by Leo Pulst in late 2008.

=== Birthday party controversy ===
On 4 July 2007 Rein Lang celebrated his 50th birthday at a beer restaurant in Tartu, Estonia. The party featured a performance of the play Adolf, an award-winning anti-fascist drama by Pip Utton, featuring a Nazi banner as a stage prop. In an additional note on the invitation Lang pointed out that the event was not intended as a fancy dress party; specifically, guests would not be expected to arrive in uniforms or bearing Nazi symbols. The Russian media spun this event as the minister "decorating his birthday with swastikas", citing an Estonian newspaper which recalled a scandal that happened three years ago, when Prince Harry had a swastika on his sleeve during a birthday party.

This distortion was widely covered in the Estonian news media. The Nochnoy Dozor group has, in Russian media, made calls for the Minister of Justice to resign over the event. In an explanatory opinion article, Lang stated "The Republic of Estonia has condemned Nazi crimes and my birthday was attended by people who, without exception, despise fascism." Trivimi Velliste, speaking on TV3, has called Russian media's distorted coverage of this incident a case of psychological warfare.

=== "Wikigate" incident ===
On 23 July 2007 Lang's article on English Wikipedia was edited by a user identifying as "Kairioun", removing a large section on Lang's birthday controversy. After these deletions were consistently reverted, another user by the alias of Gerog112 performed a similar deletion many times, resulting in a 24-hour restriction of editing privileges (sometimes mistakenly reported as a three-month restriction), and made a number of bizarre statements in Estonian. News media quickly traced the user Kairioun to Kairi Õun, an advisor of Lang, leading to considerable coverage of the incident, which Henrik Roonemaa, in an analysis session in Tehnokratt, dubbed "Wikigate". Gerog112's real life identity remains unknown.

Political offices
Preceded by Kristiina Ojuland	Minister of Foreign Affairs; February 2005 – April 2005	Succeeded by Urmas Paet
Preceded by Ken-Marti Vaher	Minister of Justice; 2005–2011	Succeeded by Kristen Michal
Preceded by Laine Jänes (Randjärv)	Minister of Culture; 2011–2013	Succeeded by Urve Tiidus
