= Beer in Estonia =

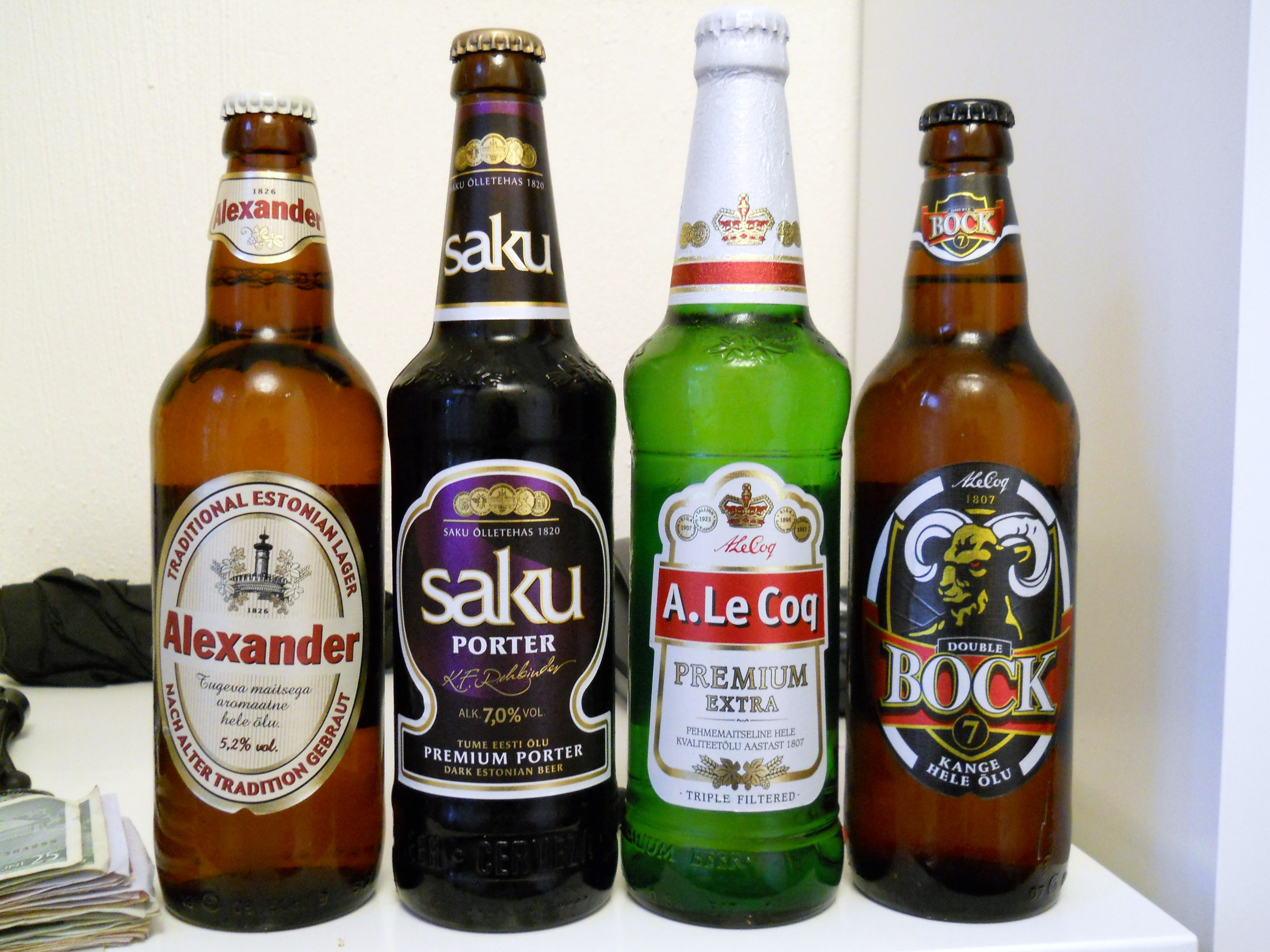
Estonian beers from Saku (second from left) and A. Le Coq (others)

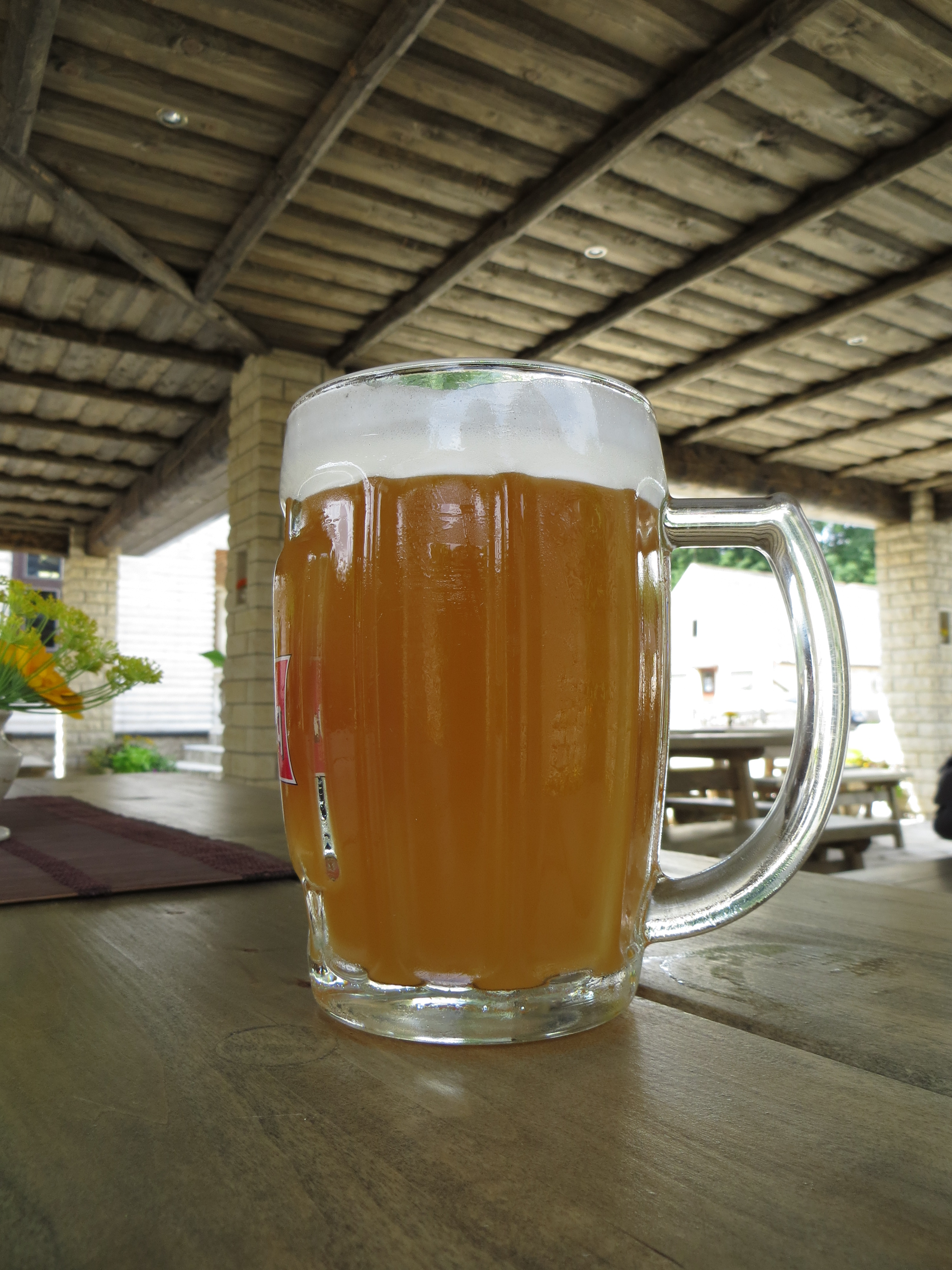
A glass of Pihtla koduõlu

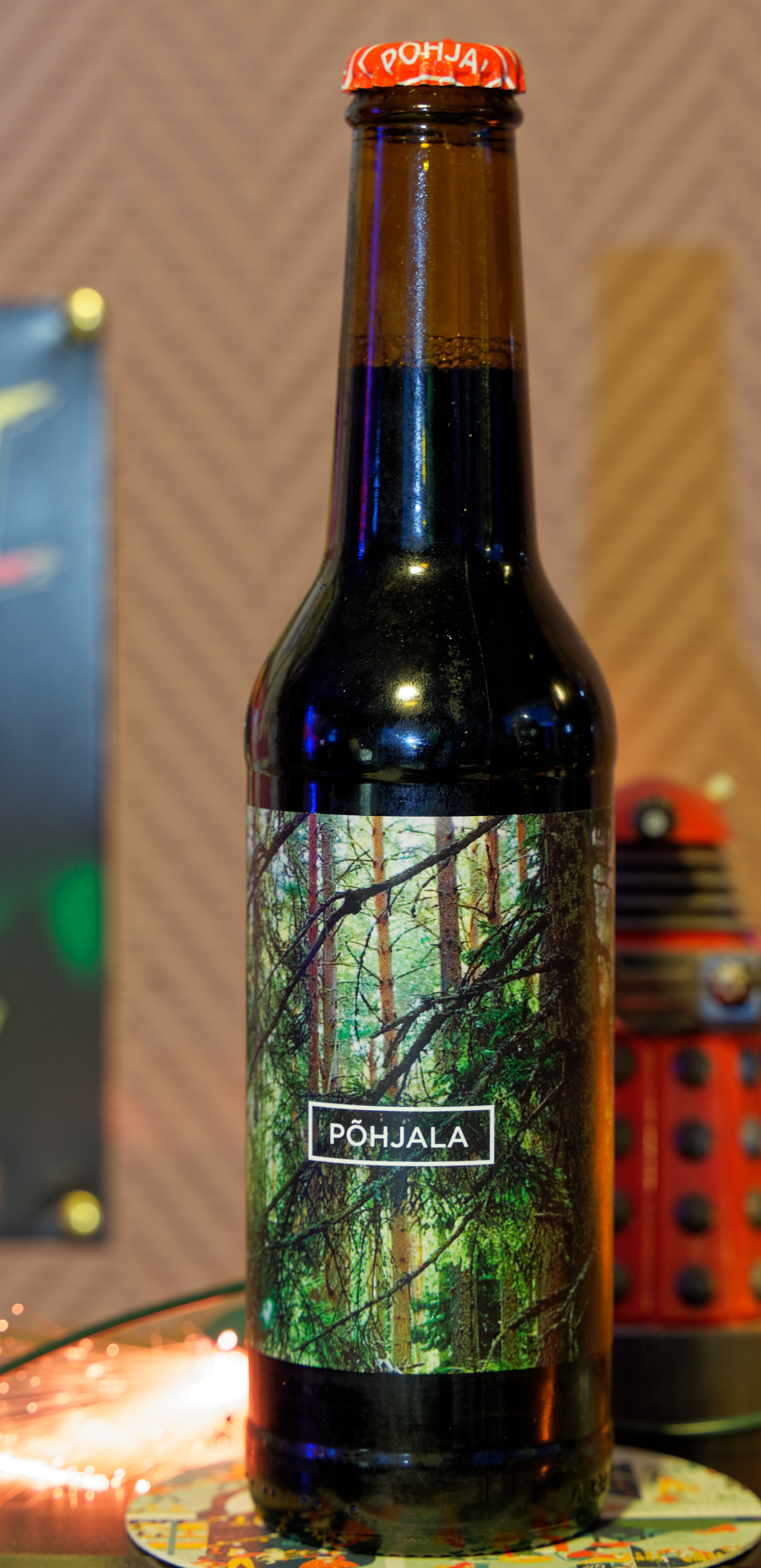
Põhjala Beery Christmas 2019

Beer (Estonian: Õlu) has been brewed in Estonia for over a thousand years. The first written reference to beer in what is now Estonia dates to 1284. In Estonian, beers are often described as hele (pale) or tume (dark).

== Major breweries ==
The Estonian beer market is dominated by Saku and A. Le Coq, who in 2022 together possessed over 90 percent of market share. Saku was founded in 1820 in the town of Saku near Tallinn and is owned by Carlsberg Group. Tartu's A. Le Coq was founded in 1807 and is currently owned by the Finnish company Olvi. Saku is traditionally more popular in north and west Estonia, while A. Le Coq has its heartland in the south and east.

A. Le Coq states that it is the biggest drinks manufacturer in Estonia, while Saku states that its Saku Originaal is Estonia's most popular beer brand. Both produce non-alcoholic drinks as well as beer and mixed drinks.

Both Saku and A. Le Coq operate brewery museums at their respective breweries.

Estonia's third-largest brewery was located in Haljala in Lääne-Viru County. It housed Viru Brewery until 2020 and then became the main production site of Finland's Pyynikin Brewing Company.

The Estonian Breweries Association (Eesti Õlletootjate Liit) represents the interests of the two largest breweries. The Association successfully lobbied the Estonian government into reversing rises in alcohol excise duty in 2019. This had led to a reduction in cross-border beer sales to Finland, and an increase of sales in Latvia to Estonians.

In 2025 Saku Brewery stated that sales of non-alcoholic beer had increased threefold since 2017. The company's product range included 16 non-alcoholic beers, the most popular of which was Saku Rock Zero.

The production of once popular former Soviet Žiguli (Zhigulevskoye) beer was discontinued in Estonia by the end of 20th century.

== Koduõlu ==
Estonia has a tradition of home-brewed beers (koduõlu) and farm beers (taluõlu) which survives mainly on the West Estonian islands. They are often flavoured with juniper and other plants such as sweet gale, also known as bog-myrtle. Unlike many beers, koduõlu is not boiled during the production process and is served with only natural carbonation. Pihtla farmhouse brewery on the island of Saaremaa was originally established in 1907 and describes its beers as "cloudy, yeasty and unpredictable."

== Craft beer ==
Craft beer came late to Estonia, but that began to change in 2012 when Mikkeller brewed a custom beer for the Estonian market, called Baltic Frontier. Then one local brewer in particular, Põhjala, led the way for other Estonian microbrewers such as Lehe, Koeru and Õllenaut. By 2017 there were nearly 30 microbreweries on the Estonian market, in a country with a population of only 1.2 million. In 2021, one of the country's larger craft breweries, Tanker, was acquired by the Danish company Royal Unibrew.

Estonian craft brewers are favoured by a system of progressive beer duty. Producers brewing up to 300,000 litres a year pay just half of ordinary excise duty rates.

Since 2015 Põhjala Brewery has organised an annual craft beer festival called "Tallinn Craft Beer Weekend".

The Estonian Association of Small Brewers (Eesti Väikepruulijate Liit) was established in 2013 with the aim of "developing the Estonian tradition of handcrafted beer, wine and cider and furthering the Estonian alcohol culture by providing quality products and educating the consumer."

== Gallery of Estonian breweries ==
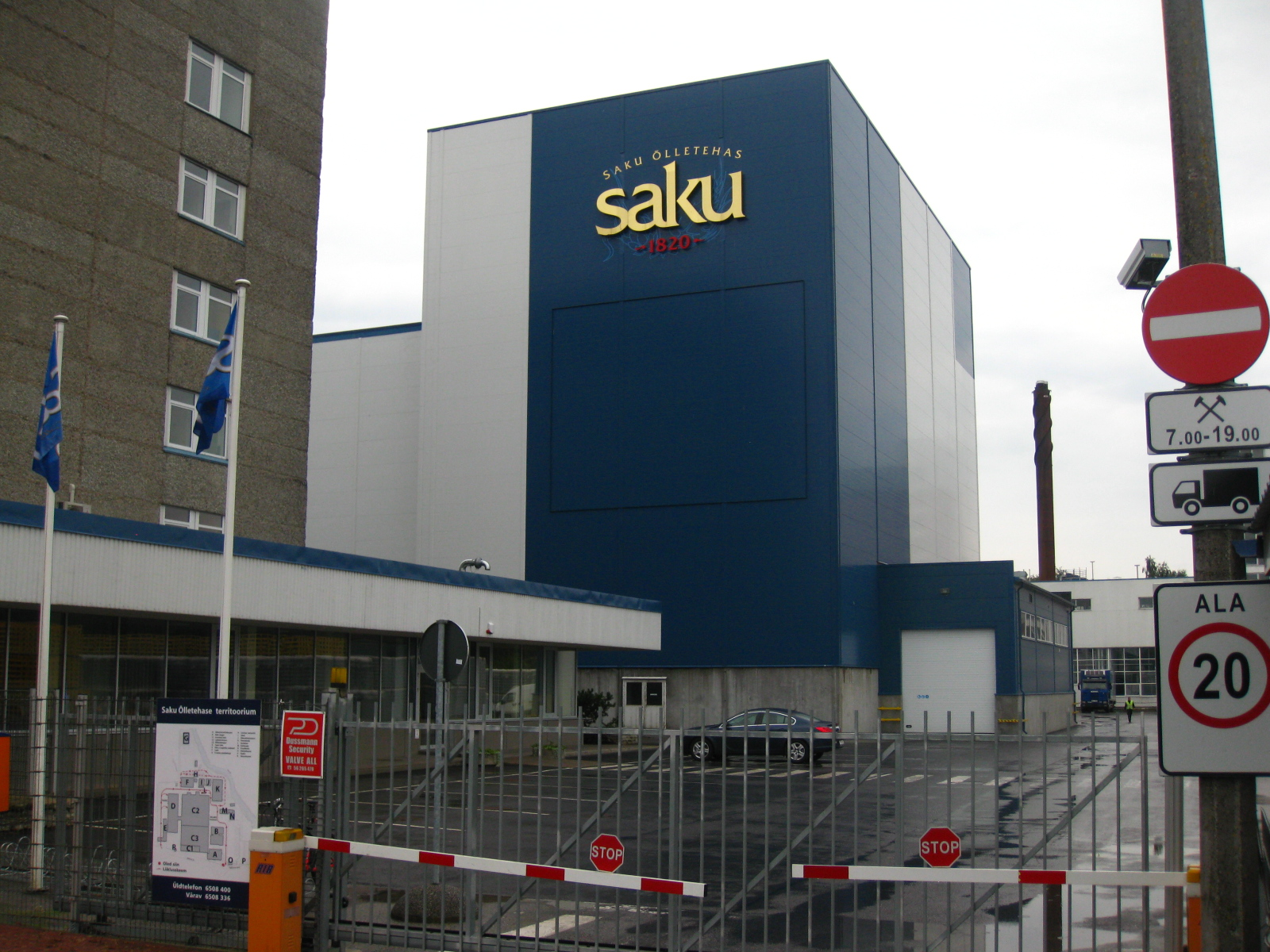
Saku Brewery, in Saku

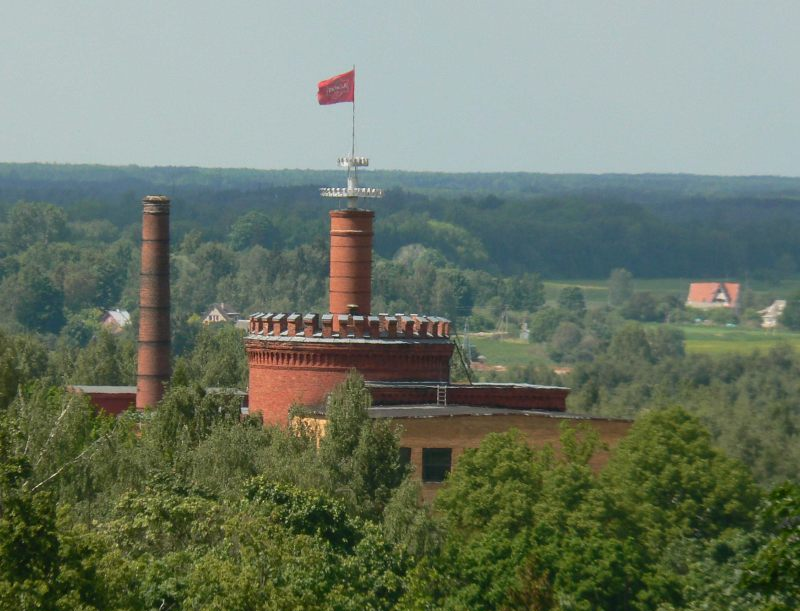
A. Le Coq Brewery in Tartu

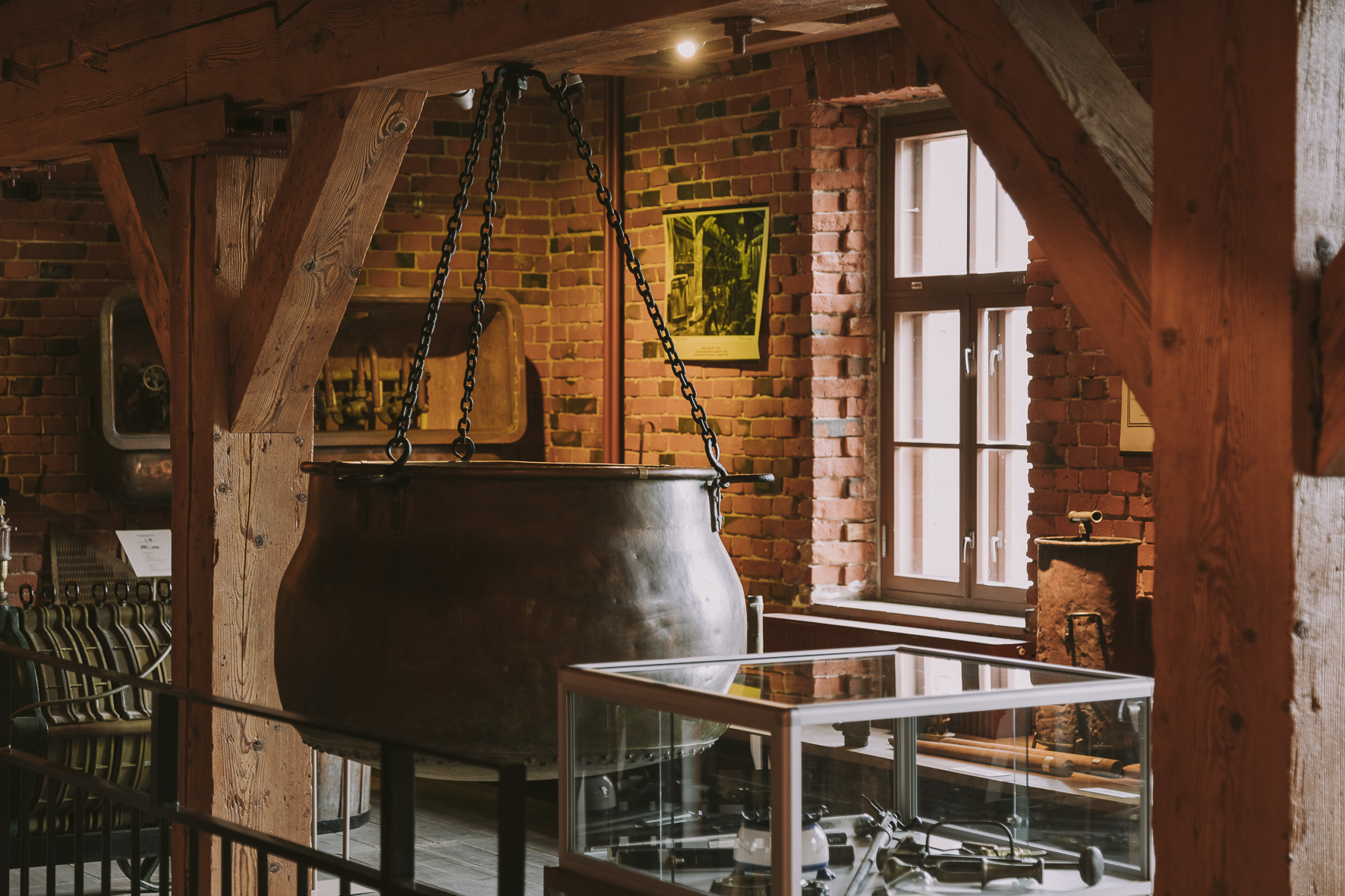
A. Le Coq's beer museum

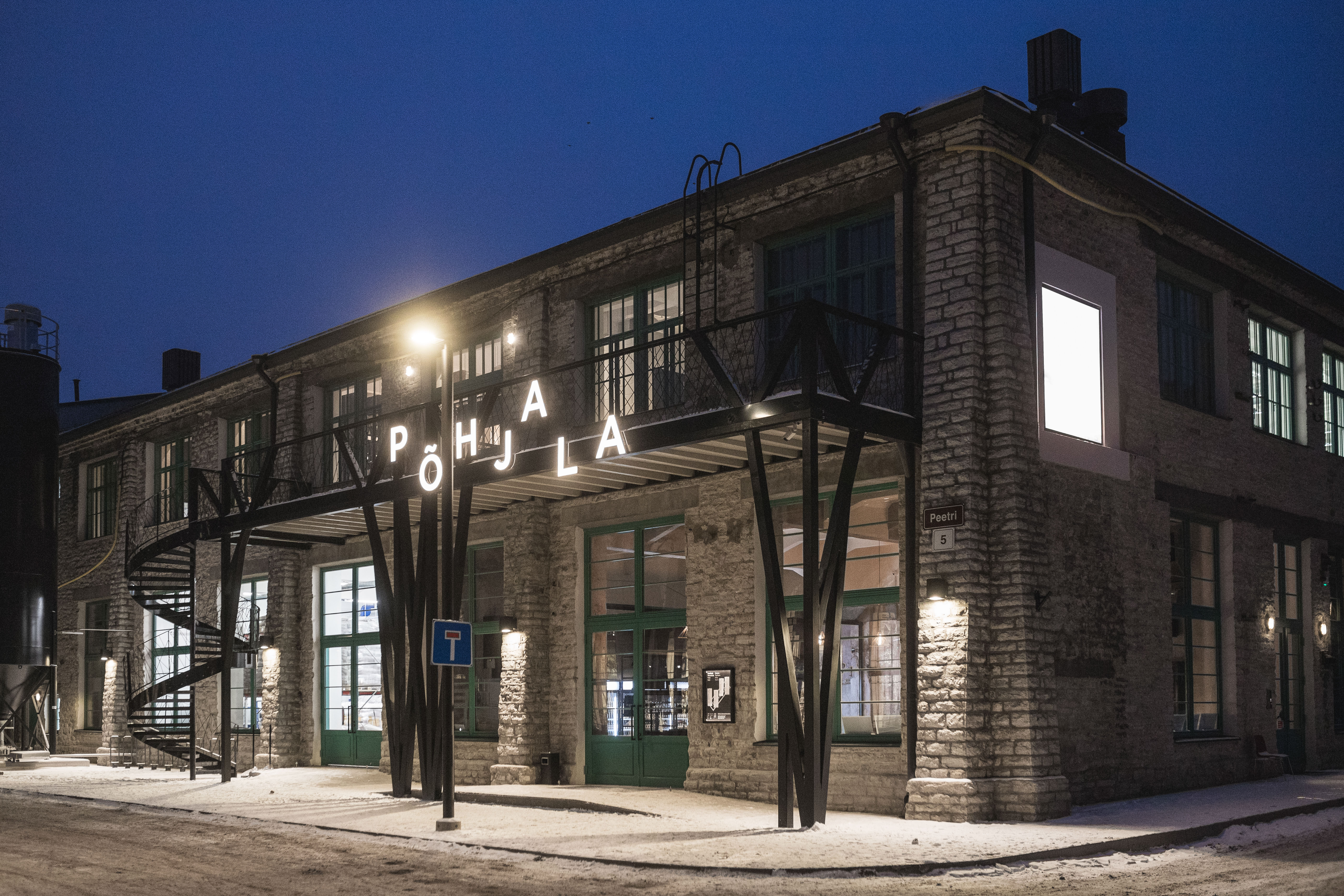
Põhjala Brewery & Tap Room, Tallinn

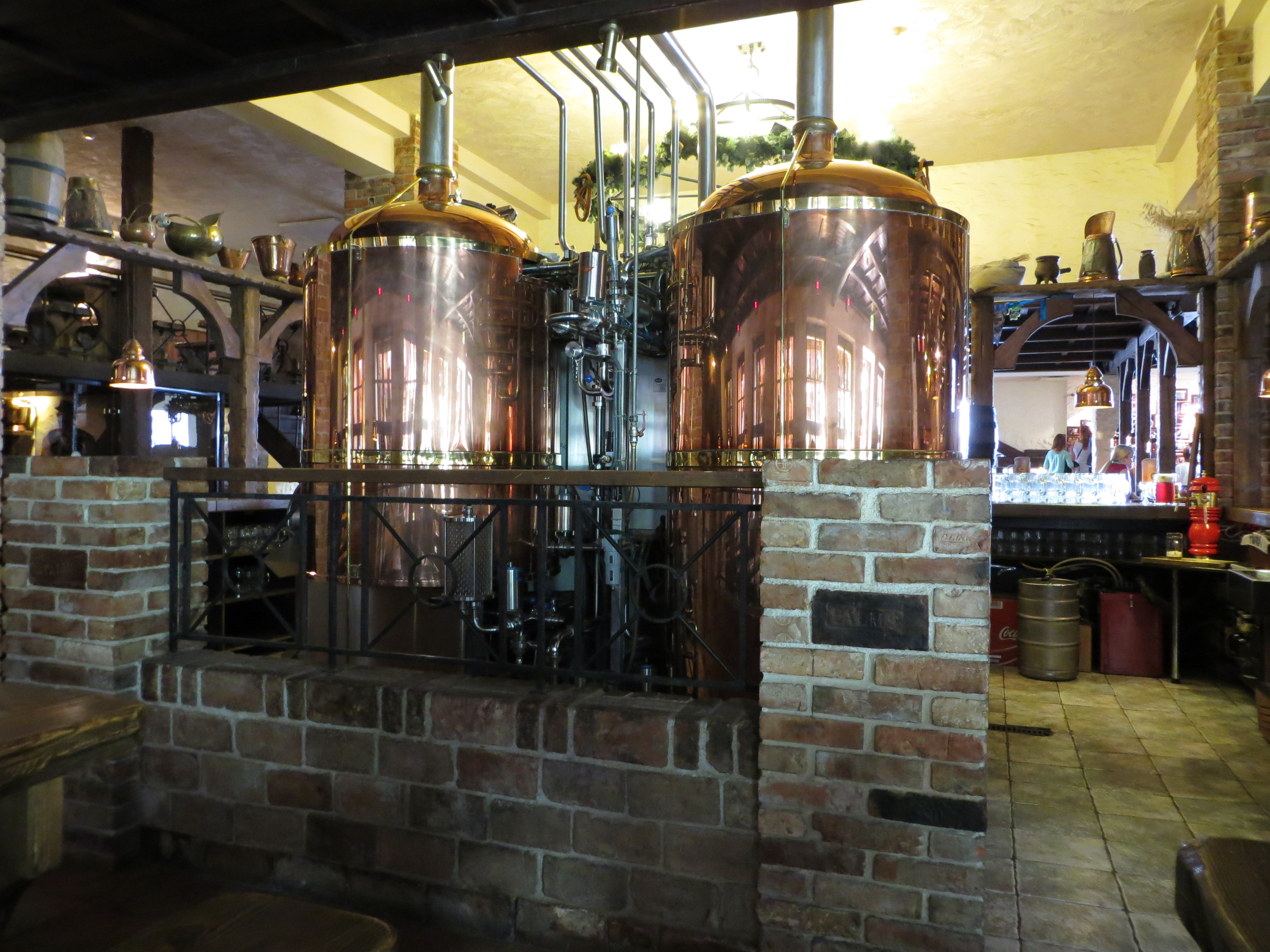
"Beer House" brewpub, Tallinn

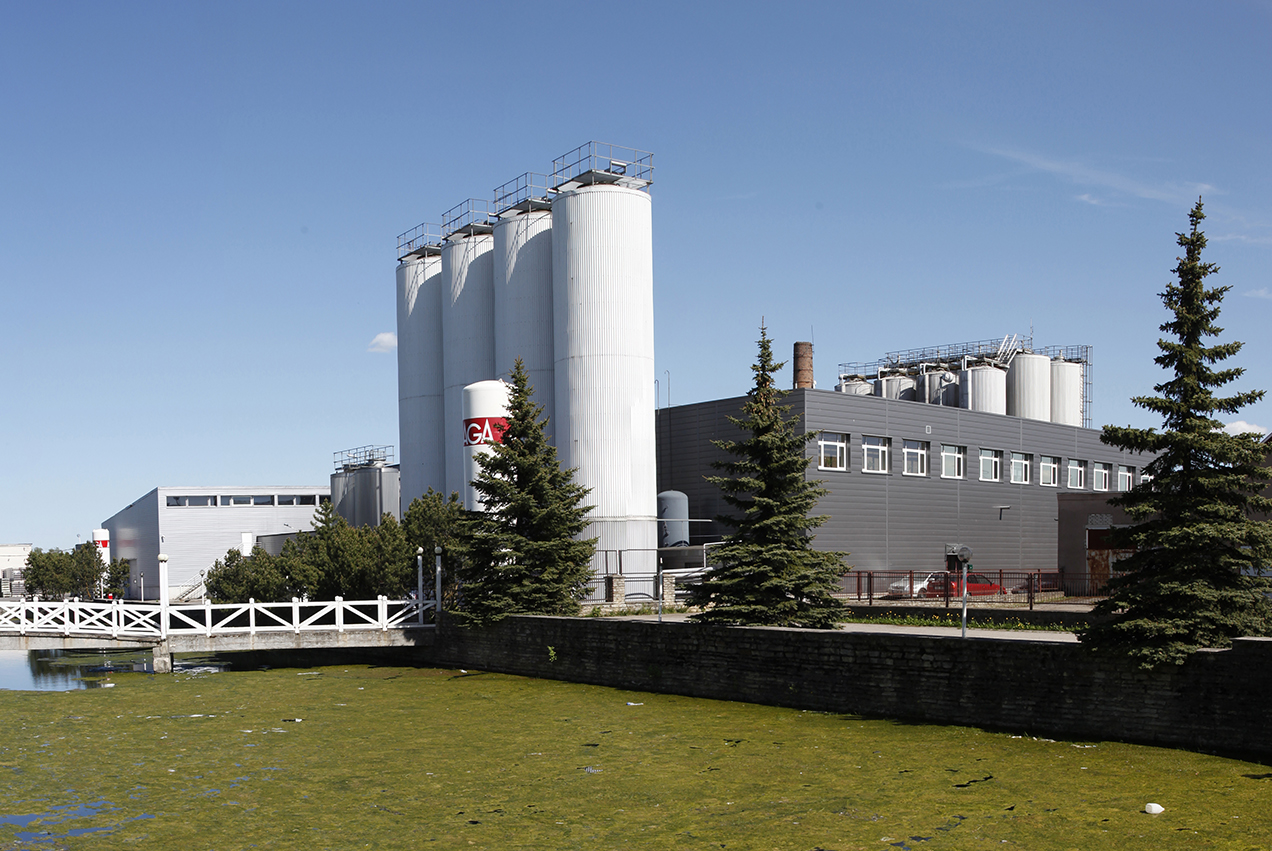
Pyynikin's Haljala brewery
