= Lepa =

Lepa may refer to:

== People ==
- Astrid Lepa (1924–2015), Estonian actress and director
- Margus Lepa (born 1953), Estonian radio journalist and actor

== Places ==
- Palma de Mallorca Airport, assigned the ICAO code LEPA
- Lepa, Samoa village in Samoa
- Lepa, Estonia, village in Valga Parish, Valga County, Estonia
- Lepä, village in Setomaa Parish, Võru County, Estonia
- Lepa Ves, village in Croatia

== Science ==
- LEPA, low-energy precision application irrigation
- Leader peptidase A (LepA), elongation factor (biology)
- Lepas, a genus of goose barnacles

== Other uses ==
- Lepa (ship), the traditional houseboats of the Sama-Bajau people
- Lepa (given name), a feminine given name
