= Viru Brewery =

Company based in Estonia

AS Viru Õlu
- Industry: Brewing
- Predecessor: Viru kolhoos Õlletehas
- Founded: 1975
- Headquarters: Haljala, Estonia
- Products: Beer and soft drinks
- Parent: Harboes Bryggeri A/S
- Website: www.wiru.ee/en

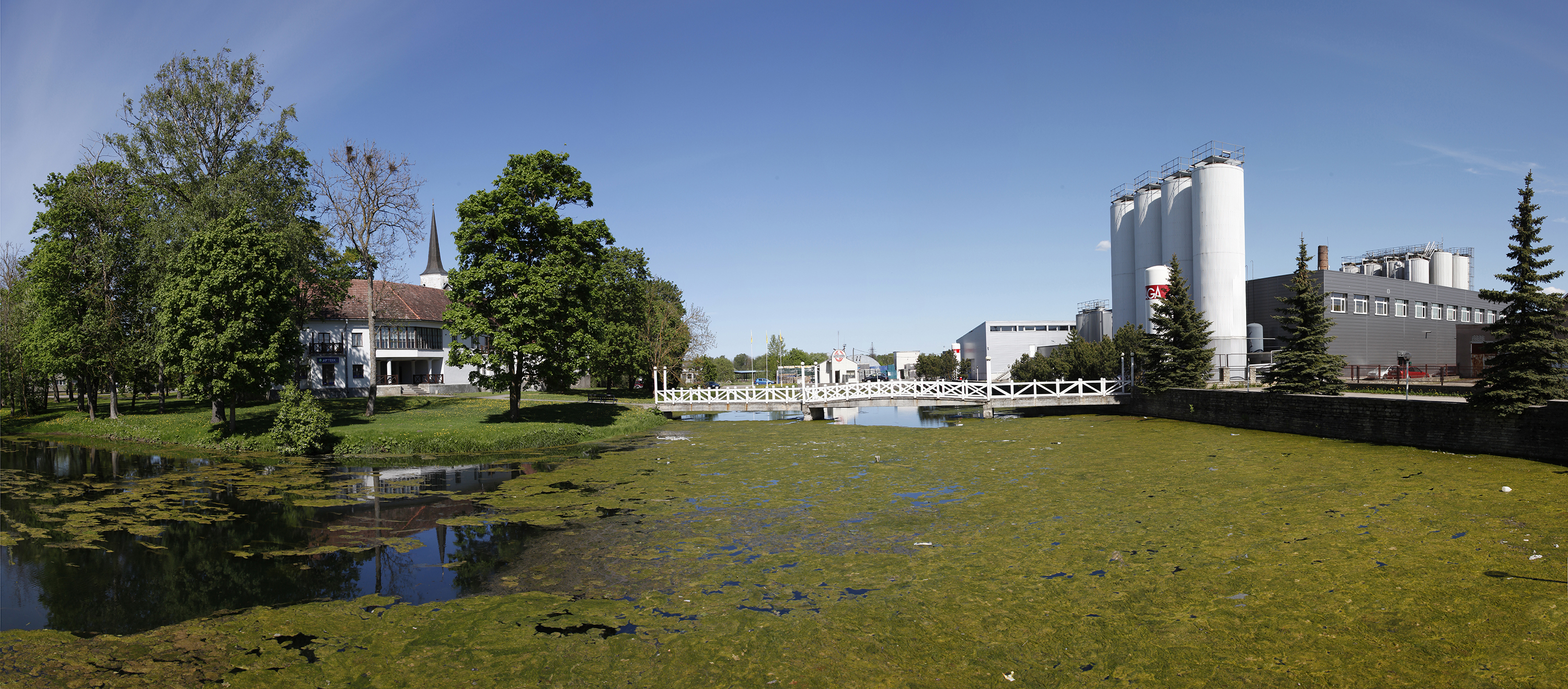
Viru Brewery in Haljala, 2009

Viru Brewery was Estonia's third largest brewery, and produced the Wiru, Puls, Žiguli and various other brands. It was located in Haljala in Lääne-Viru County. Production of beer was discontinued in 2020.

== History ==
Viru Brewery grew out of one of the branches of the Viru collective farm, or kolkhoz in 1975. Originally only Žiguli beer was produced, a pale lager with minimum 2.8% abv which was brewed throughout the Soviet Union. During the first year, 640.000 litres of beer was produced, and in the following year more than five million litres of beer was made in Haljala.

In 1991, the collective brewery was formed into AS Viru Õlu, and in 1992 Harboes Bryggeri A/S of Denmark became the biggest shareholder. Production of Christmas beer, Bear Beer and soft drinks started in the 1990s. In 2008, Viru Brewery bought the "Puls" trademark of the former Pärnu Brewery.

In February 1997, a strong light beer Bear Beer (7.5%) was licensed from Harboes Bryggeri. Later, Bear Beer was produced with up to 10% alcohol content. In 2001, the Frederik brand was introduced. New beer varieties Frederik Premium and Frederik Pilsner, light alcoholic drink Shandy (2.5%) were launched.

Viru Brewery was a member of the Estonian Breweries Association (Eesti Õlletootjate Liit) which represents the interests of the larger Estonian breweries. In 2019 the company declared a net loss of 488,200 euros.

In July 2020, Harboe Group announced that beer production would be transferred from Haljala to other Harboe breweries in Germany and Denmark, following years of financial losses. The Haljala brewery was sold to a Finnish businessman, who leased it to the Pyynikin Brewing Company of Tampere.

== See also ==
- Beer in Estonia
