= Laine Randjärv =

Estonian politician (born 1964)

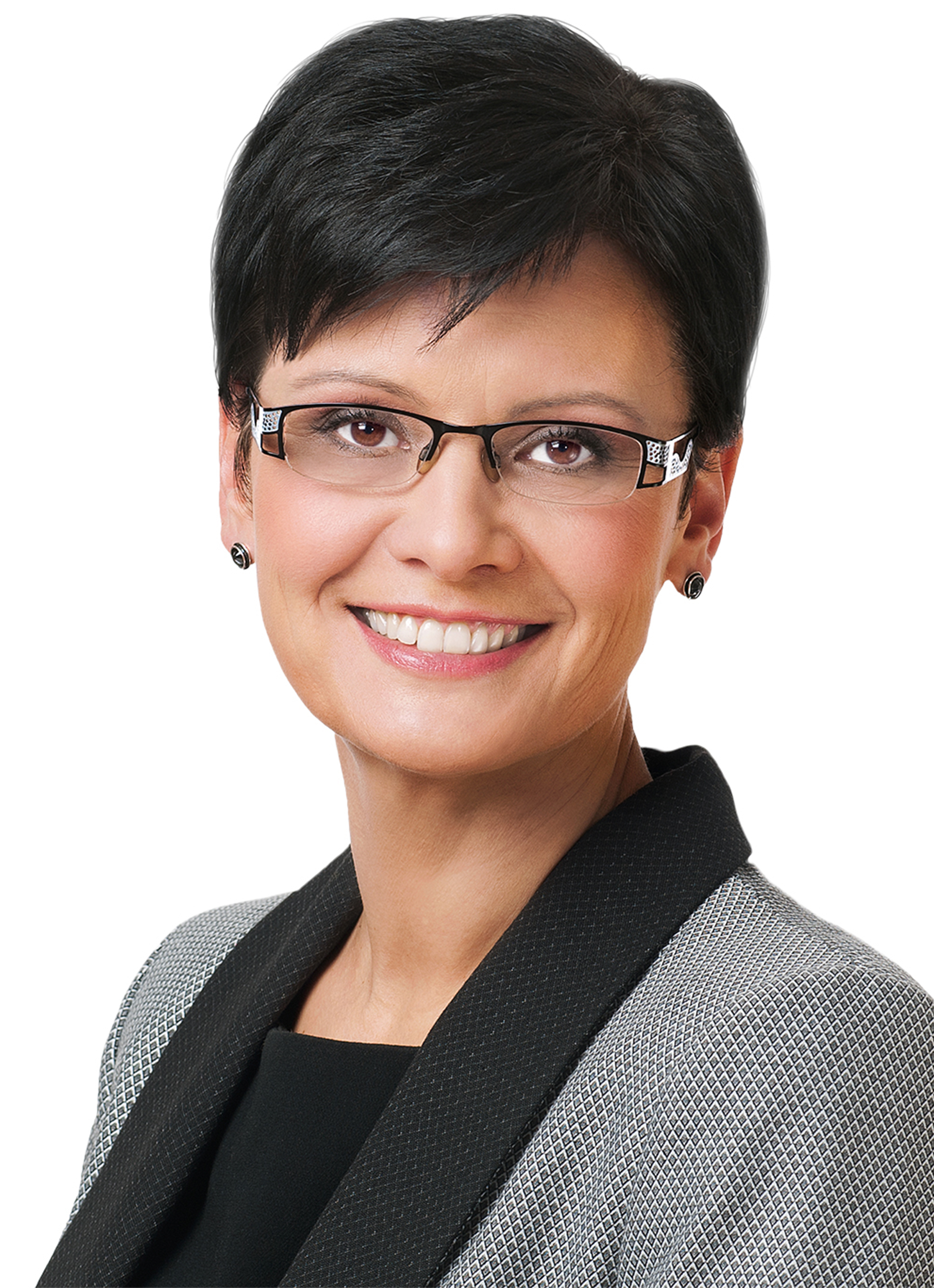

Minister of Culture
- In office 5 April 2007 – 6 April 2011
- Prime Minister: Andrus Ansip
- Preceded by: Raivo Palmaru
- Succeeded by: Rein Lang

Personal details
- Born: 30 July 1964 (age 62) Moscow, Russian SFSR, Soviet Union
- Party: Estonian Reform Party
- Website: https://lainerandjarv.com/

Laine Randjärv (before 2011 Laine Jänes; born 30 July 1964) is an Estonian politician from the Reform Party. She was the mayor of Tartu from 23 September 2004 to 2007, and previously she was deputy mayor from 2002 to 2004. From 2007 to 2011, she served as the Minister of Culture in Andrus Ansip's second government.

== Awards ==
- 3 December 2015 - the Armenian Medal of Honour, presented by Eduard Sharmazanov

== See also ==
- List of first female mayors

Political offices
Preceded by Andrus Ansip	Mayor of Tartu; 2004–2007	Succeeded by Urmas Kruuse
Preceded by Raivo Palmaru	Minister of Culture; 2007–2011	Succeeded by Rein Lang
