= Raimo Aas =

Estonian humorist (born 1953)

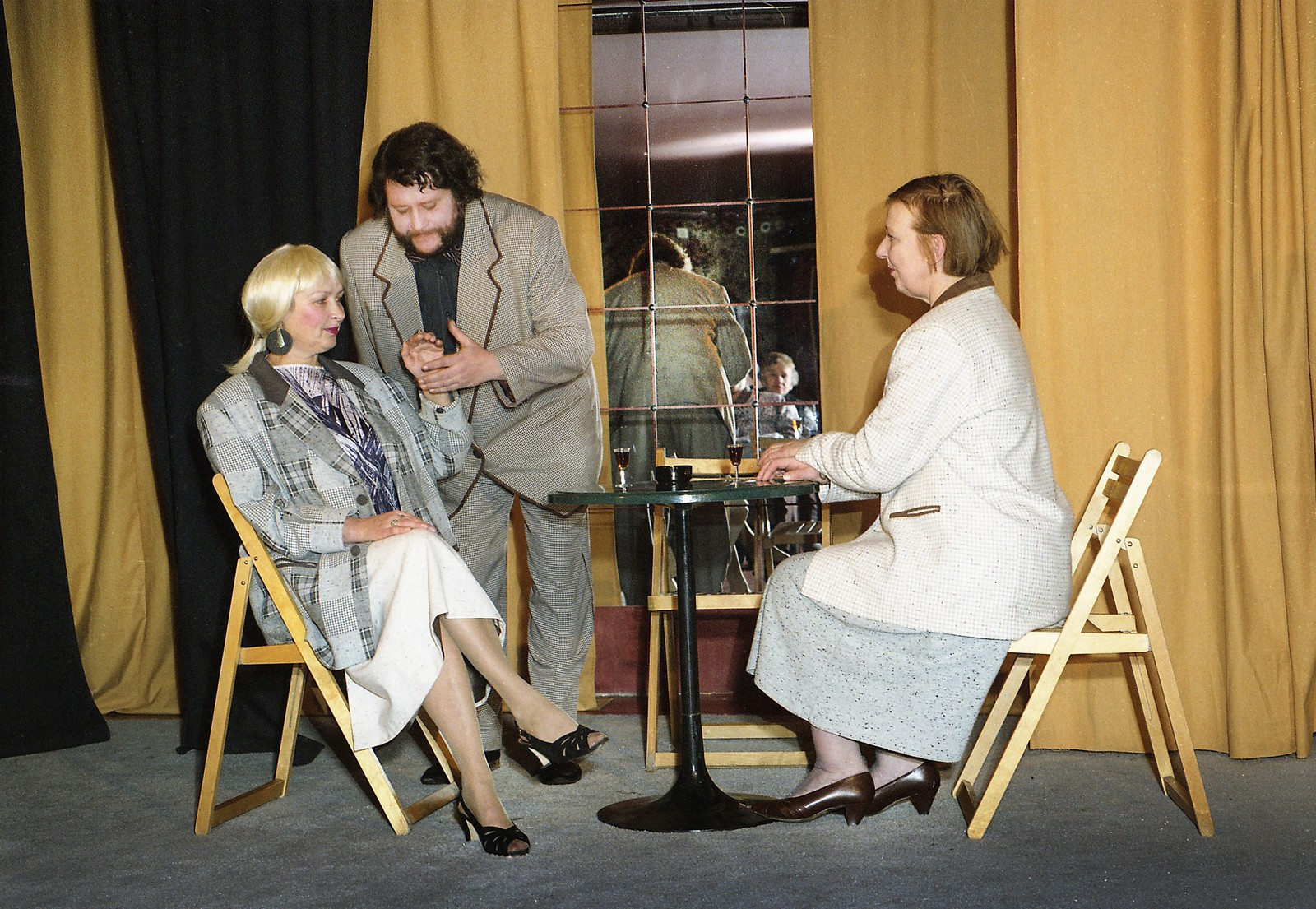
- Raimo Aas with Luule Komissarov and Ines Aru
- Born: 18 June 1953 (age 73); Tallinn, then part of Estonian SSR, Soviet Union
- Known for: the Meie Mats award for lifelong work in humour

Raimo Aas (born 18 June 1953 in Tallinn) is an Estonian humorist.

== Radio career ==
Raimo Aas performed together with Margus Lepa in the Sunday morning radio programme Meelejahutaja for several years.

== Performance prohibition ==
Aas was subject to a six-month Soviet prohibition of public performance for singing, on the tune of Pust' vsegda budet solnce (Russian for "May there always be sunshine"; Estonian: Olgu jääv meile päike), lyrics that can be translated as "May there always be sunshine, may there always be smoked sausages". The performance was deemed as insulting to Soviet youth.

== Awards ==
In 1999, Raimo Aas was awarded the Meie Mats award for lifelong work in humour.
