= Auküla =

Village in Estonia

- Village
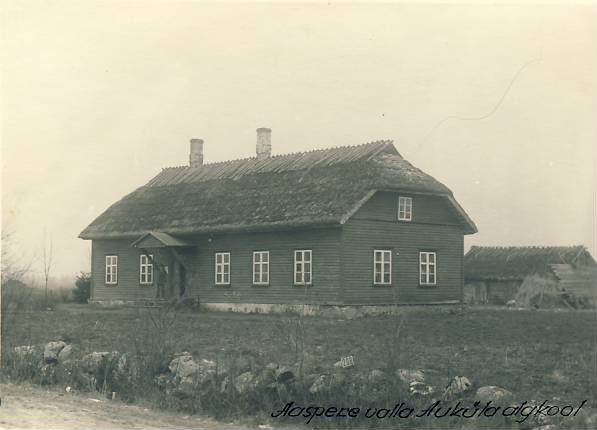
- Auküla school in 1922

- Location in Estonia
- Coordinates: 59°24′31″N 26°11′18″E
- Country: Estonia
- County: Lääne-Viru County
- Municipality: Haljala Parish

Population (2011 Census)
  - Total: 59

Auküla is a village in Haljala Parish, Lääne-Viru County, in northern Estonia. It is located about 4 km (2 mi) southwest of Haljala, the administrative centre of the municipality, and about 11 km (7 mi) northwest of the town of Rakvere. As of the 2011 census, the settlement's population was 59.

In 1861, a local three-grade school started operating in Auküla. However, in 1930 it was closed due to the economic crisis. Nowadays the schoolhouse is used as a residential building. In 1996 a memorial stone was erected in front of the building.
