= Radio Kuku =

Estonian radio station

Coordinates: 59°24′46.74″N 24°45′24.87″E

Raadio Kuku
- Estonia
- Broadcast area: Estonia

Programming
- Language: Estonian

Ownership
- Owner: Postimees Grupp (MM Grupp)

History
- First air date: March 1, 1992

Links
- Website: kuku.postimees.ee

Radio Kuku (Estonian: Raadio Kuku, also called Kuku-raadio) is an Estonian radio station. It was the first politically independent privately owned radio station in post-occupation Estonia, established in 1992 by a media businessman and later politician Rein Lang and a founder of the first politically independent newspaper Eesti Ekspress, Hans H. Luik.

In the winter of 2014, Kuku had 144,000 regular listeners and was the most popular private radio station in Estonia among the Estonian-speaking population. Almost 80,000 people regularly listen to Kuku's morning and afternoon program. Almost 40 percent of Kuku's listeners have higher education and 60 percent live in cities.

== See also ==
- Keskpäevatund
