= Margus Lepa =

Estonian radio journalist and actor

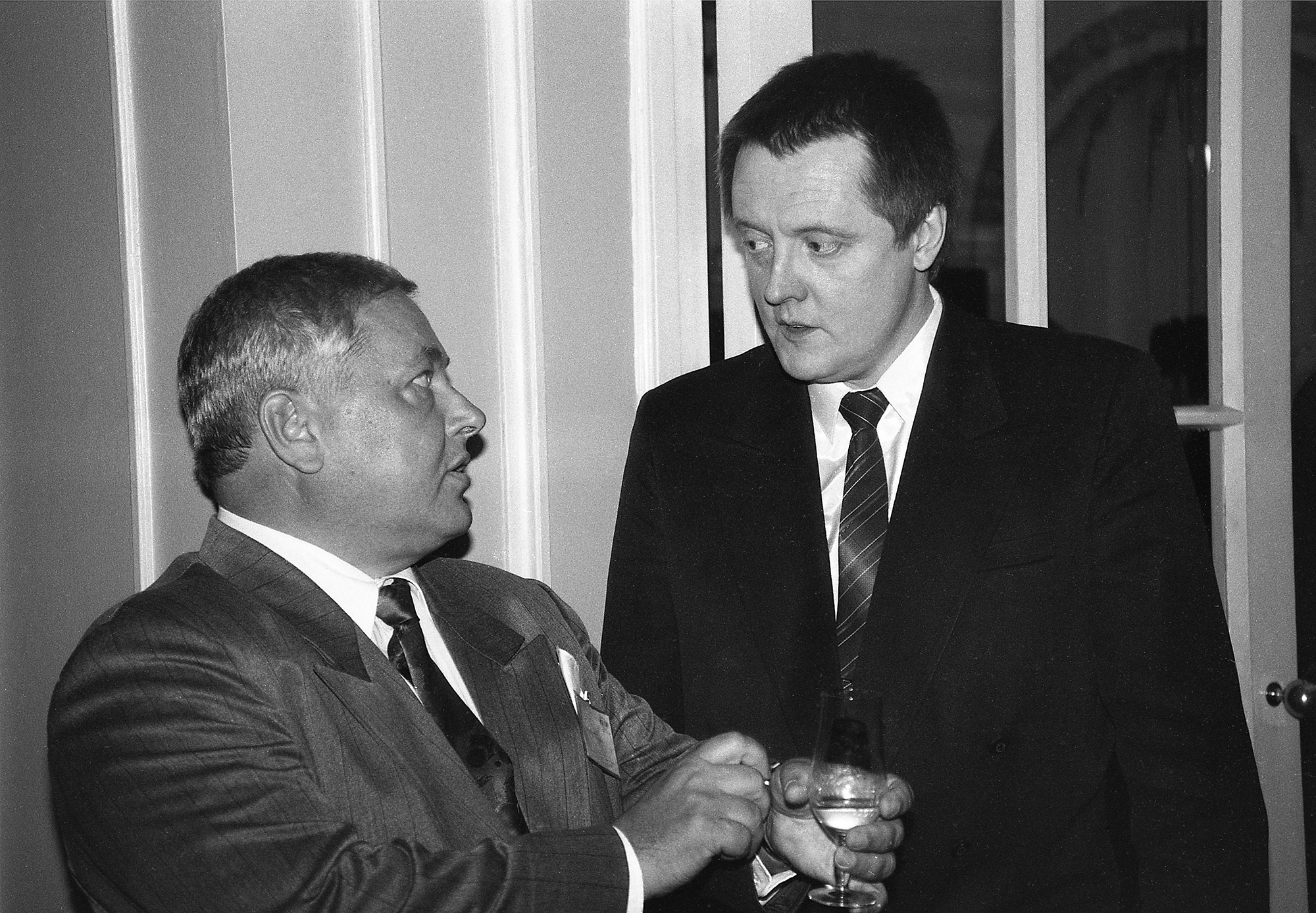
- Tõnu Alveus and Margus Lepa (1992)
- Born: 7 October 1953 (age 72); Pelgulinn, Tallinn, Estonia
- Occupations: Journalist, actor
- Years active: Since 1969

Margus Lepa (born 7 October 1953) is an Estonian radio journalist and former actor.

== Early life and education ==
He was born in Pelgulinn, a subdistrict of Tallinn, Estonia to baritone Harry Vilpart and actress Astrid Lepa. In 1978, he graduated from the Department of Performing Arts of the Tallinn State Conservatory (now, the Estonian Academy of Music and Theatre).

== Career ==
=== Film acting ===
Between 1970 and 2020, Lepa portrayed the character of Georg Aadniel Kiir in the films Kevade (Spring) (1970), Suvi (Summer) (1976) Sügis (Autumn) (1991), and Talve (Winter) (2020), all directed by Arvo Kruusement, apart from Talve, and based on a series of novels by Oskar Luts.

Filmography

Year	Title	Genre	Role	Notes
1970	Kevade	drama	Kiir	
1976	Suvi	comedy-drama	Kiir	
1991	Sügis	comedy-drama	Kiir	
2020	Talve	comedy-drama	Kiir	

=== Radio acting ===
For many years, he performed, together with Raimo Aas, in Meelejahutaja., a Sunday morning radio programme.

=== Other ===
Lepa is known for having translated Adolf Hitler's autobiographical manifesto Mein Kampf to Estonian.
