= Hillar Palamets =

Estonian historian and radio presenter (1927–2022)

Hillar Palamets (13 July 1927 – 20 May 2022) was an Estonian historian and radio presenter.

== Biography ==
Palamets was born in Tallinn, Estonia on 13 July 1927. In 1951, he graduated from Tartu State University, specialising in Soviet history. From 1961 to 1996, he taught at the University of Tartu.

He was the author and host of the radio program Ajalootund. The program lasted 18 years, ending in 2012, and featured 888 individual broadcasts.

Palamets died on 20 May 2022, aged 94.

== Awards ==
- 1974: Honored Teacher of the Estonian SSR

== Works ==
- 1977: Alma mater Tartuensis
- 1982: Tartu ülikooli ajalugu. III (co-author)
- 1982: Alma mater Tartuensis (co-author)
