= Urve Tiidus =

Estonian politician (born 1954)

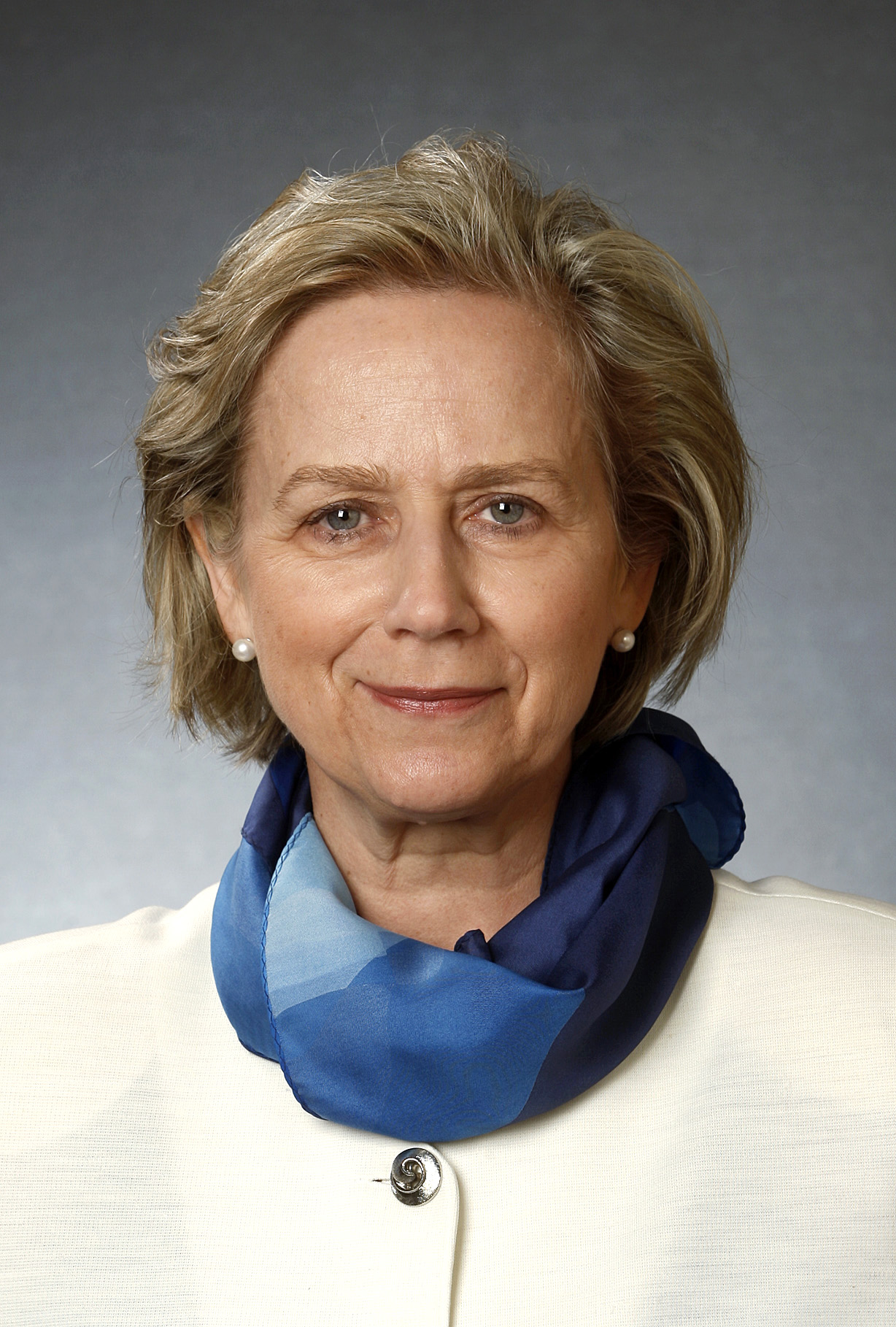

Minister of Culture of Estonia
- In office 4 December 2013 – 9 April 2015
- Prime Minister: Taavi Rõivas
- Preceded by: Rein Lang
- Succeeded by: Indrek Saar

Personal details
- Born: Urve Uussaar; 6 June 1954 (age 72) Rapla, then part of Estonian SSR, Soviet Union
- Party: Estonian Reform Party
- Education: Tartu University

Urve Tiidus (née Uussaar; born 6 June 1954) is an Estonian politician, member of the Reform Party and former journalist. She was Minister of Culture in Taavi Rõivas's first cabinet. She has been a member of Riigikogu since 2011. Before that she served as the mayor of Kuressaare.

== Early life ==
Urve Tiidus was born on 6 June 1954 in Rapla. She studied at Tallinn School No. 21 and graduated from the University of Tartu as an English philologist in 1977. After graduation, she started her career in television. She has also been a news anchor of Aktuaalne kaamera, a popular Estonian evening news programme on ETV. She was a spokeswoman for the Estonian voting results at the Eurovision Song Contests of 1994 and 1998.

From 2005-2011, Urve Tiidus was the Mayor of Kuressaare. From 1999-2001, Urve Tiidus served as the Director of the Kuressaare City Government's Department of Education and Culture. Urve Tiidus has worked for a long time in the field of journalism, working for Eesti Televisioon from 1977-1991 and from 1995-1999. During the period 2001-2005, she was a news anchor in the Kanal 2 news division.

== Political career ==
President Toomas Hendrik Ilves named Urve Tiidus as the new Minister of Culture on the proposal of Prime Minister Andrus Ansip. According to law, the Minister can begin performing her duties after taking the oath of office before the Riigikogu. Prior to assuming her position as Minister of Culture, Urve Tiidus served as a member of the Riigikogu’s European Union Affairs Committee and the Finance Committee.

== Minister of Culture ==
On 4 December 2013 Urve Tiidus became Minister of Culture in Andrus Ansip's government after Rein Lang's resignation.

Political offices
Preceded by Urmas Treiel	Mayor of Kuressaare; 2005–2011	Succeeded by Mati Mäetalu
Preceded by Rein Lang	Minister of Culture; 2013–2015	Succeeded by Indrek Saar
