= Adolf (drama) =

Monodrama about Hitler by Pip Utton

Adolf is a monodrama written by British actor and playwright Pip Utton in 1997 (originally performed by him and directed by Guy Masterson), and in its latest form, first produced in 2002. In reviewing Hitler's inner world, the play carries several anti-Fascism undertones.

The play has had considerable success internationally; it has been performed in India, Ireland, Hong Kong, Netherlands, Belgium, Germany, Estonia, Singapore, Norway, New Zealand, Cyprus and Australia. A performance was also given in Finland and Turkey.

== Structure ==
The play is customarily performed by a single actor playing all the roles. The only major role is that of Adolf Hitler.

Set in the Hitler's underground Führerbunker in 1945 and designed to be played using minimal resources, the props of the play are limited to three: a banner of German Nazi party hung vertically in the background, a table in centre stage left, and a wooden chair. Promotional material often features photographs of the actor, dressed like Hitler, standing in front of the flag.

Roughly the first half of the play is spent on an overview of Hitler's political ideas, extensively citing Mein Kampf. The quotations are, to a significant extent, chosen for their obvious outrageousness, in expectation that a modern watcher wouldn't find it hard to disagree with them. The rest of the play is dedicated to demonstrating that even half a century after Hitler's death, his "poisoned utopias" and "warped logic"—the "spirit of Hitler"—live on in modern societies. A number of theatre critics have found this turnaround a defining and deeply moving aspect of the play.

== Reviews ==
Prevent Genocide International:

It is a searing analysis of fascism, and the arguments Hitler used to justify genocide to educated, cultured, reasonable people like us, making them collectively responsible for the deepest, most enduring scar on the 20th century. Adolf is structured to lull us first into believing we are on the “right” side vis-a-vis Hitler. Once we are feeling comfortable, it unsettles us by worming its way into our minds to tease out prejudices we hold consciously or unconsciously against people of other religions, regions, caste, colour or sexual orientation, whose elimination by hook or by crook would assure us, we believe, of our utopias.

== See also ==
- Rein Lang § Birthday party controversy
