= Constitutional Pilsener =

Estonian beer brand by A. Le Coq

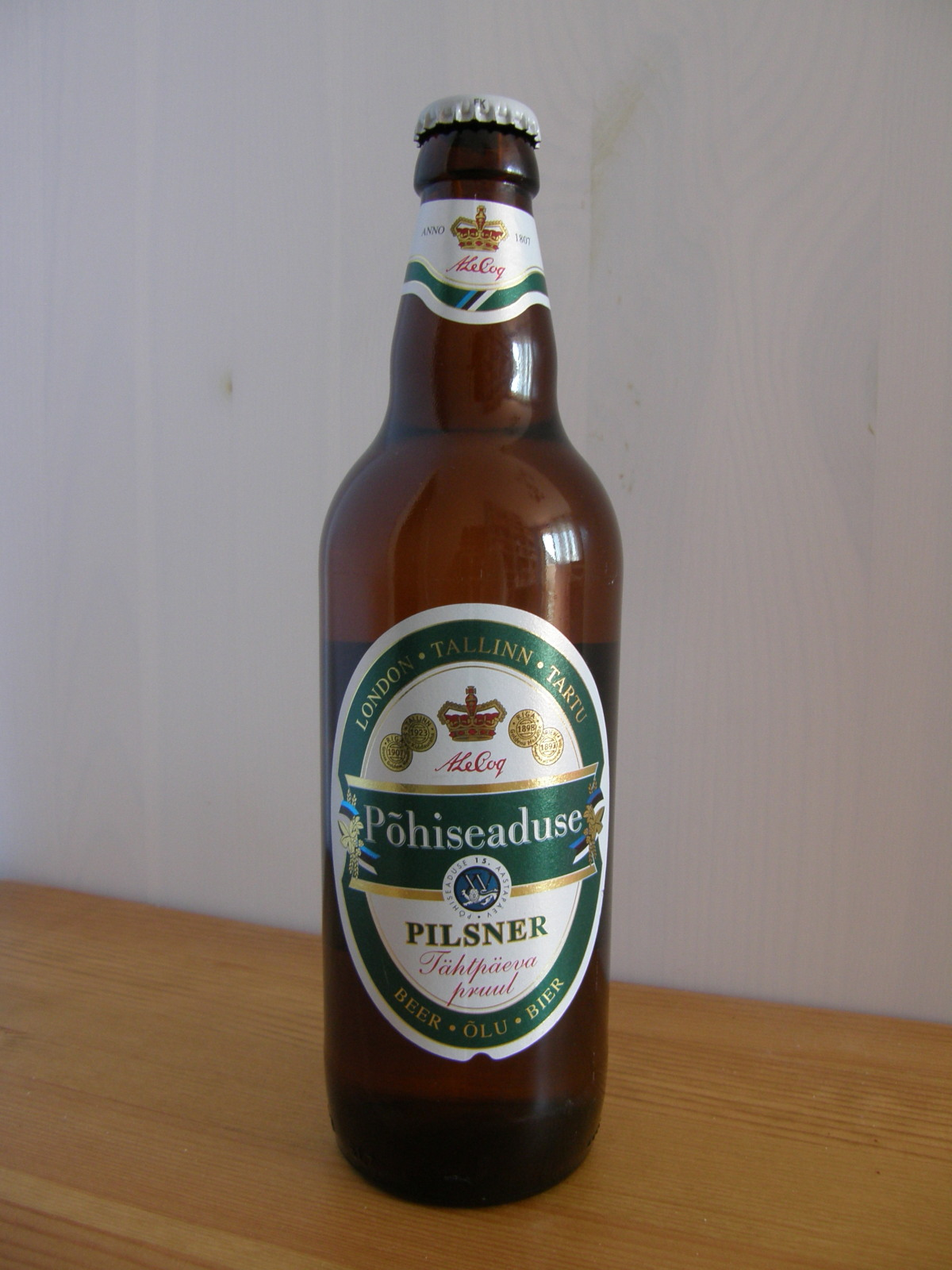
Põhiseaduse Pilsner

The Constitutional Pilsener (Estonian: Põhiseaduse Pilsner) was a beer brand brewed by A. Le Coq in 2007, in celebration of the fifteenth anniversary of Estonia's 1992 constitution and introduced in cooperation with the Estonian Ministry of Justice.

The beer was a bottom-fermented pale lager with an alcohol content of 4.2% by volume.

The competing Saku Õlletehas has denounced this approach, claiming that a pilsener is too cheap a brand of beer to be associated with the Constitution.

The leader of the Estonian Beer Association (Estonian: Eesti Õlleliit), Cardo Remmel, has expressed disagreement with Saku Õlletehas' position and approved the idea of promoting awareness of the Constitution using a beer brand.

In its editorial, Eesti Päevaleht pointed out the hypocrisy of Saku Õlletehas' position, as the latter has been producing a Presidential Pilsener for several years.
