= Raivo Palmaru =

Estonian journalist, sports figure and politician

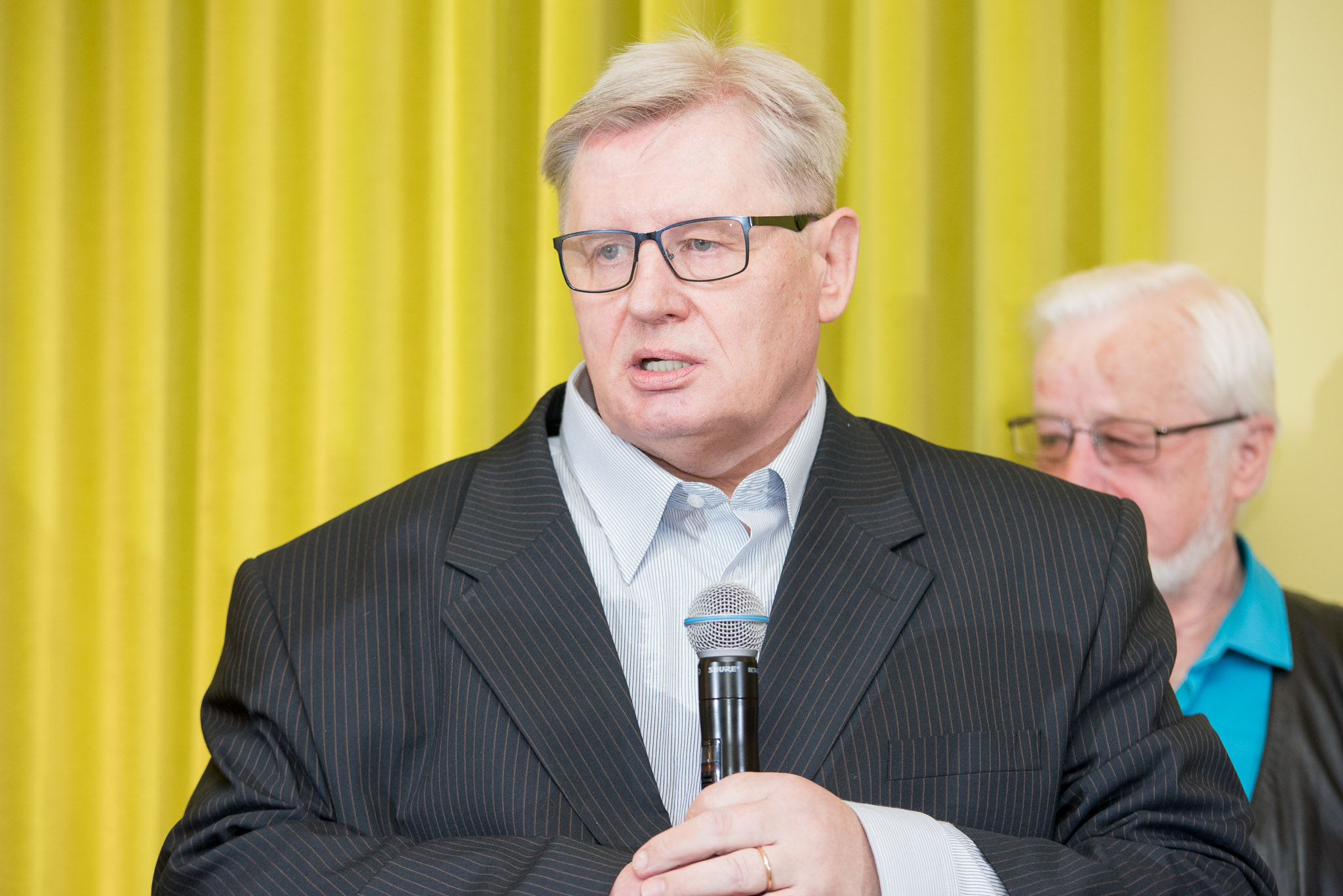
- Palmaru in 2018

Minister of Culture
- In office 2005–2007

Personal details
- Born: November 27, 1951 (age 74) Pärnu, Estonia
- Party: Centre
- Education: University of Tartu; Cum laude
- Occupation: Social scientist, journalist, sports figure, politician

Raivo Palmaru (born 27 November 1951 in Pärnu) is an Estonian social scientist, journalist, sports figure and politician.

From 2005 to 2007, he was Minister of Culture.

== Early life and education ==
Palmaru finished Pärnu 2nd Secondary School in 1970. After that, he studied at a military school. He later went on to the University of Tartu, where he completed a degree in history in 1978, graduating cum laude.

== Career ==
=== Appointment as Minister of Culture ===
Palmaru was appointed Minister of Culture in 2005. His selection attracted attention because of his background in journalism, long association with the Centre Party, and earlier work in Soviet-era institutions. Media reports also noted his stated interest in supporting cultural development and creative industries.

=== Sports and public health initiatives ===
During his term as Minister of Culture (2005–2007), Palmaru highlighted concerns about low physical activity in Estonia and supported the implementation of the 2006–2010 national plan to expand opportunities for recreational sport. He noted that participation rates were lower than in many European countries and endorsed measures aimed at making everyday exercise more accessible.

== Academic work ==
Palmaru’s 2009 book Kujutluste ühiskond was reviewed in Eesti Ekspress, which described it as a clear introduction to German constructivist ideas in media theory. The review also noted his use of concepts from the natural sciences and questioned some of his criticism of established approaches in Estonian media studies.

== Views on society and culture ==
In a 2009 Postimees opinion piece, Palmaru argued that Estonia’s economic problems were also rooted in cultural assumptions and communication patterns, not only global factors. He described culture as a shared system of knowledge that shapes how society responds to change.

== Political views ==
In a 2006 Postimees opinion piece, Palmaru replied to Sulev Valner’s criticism of his comments on press freedom. He said his remarks had been misinterpreted and argued that press freedom also requires responsibility. Palmaru added that he had not interfered in matters related to Estonian Public Broadcasting.

== Controversies ==
In 2006, Eesti Ekspress reported on a parliamentary speech in which Palmaru sharply criticised several Estonian journalists and media outlets, questioning what he described as the myth of a free and impartial press. The report also described an earlier incident in which he confronted a photographer at a public event.

== See also ==
- Ministry of Culture (Estonia)
- Politics of Estonia
- Centre Party (Estonia)
- Culture of Estonia
- Media of Estonia
