= Saku, Estonia =

Borough in Estonia

Saku
- Small town
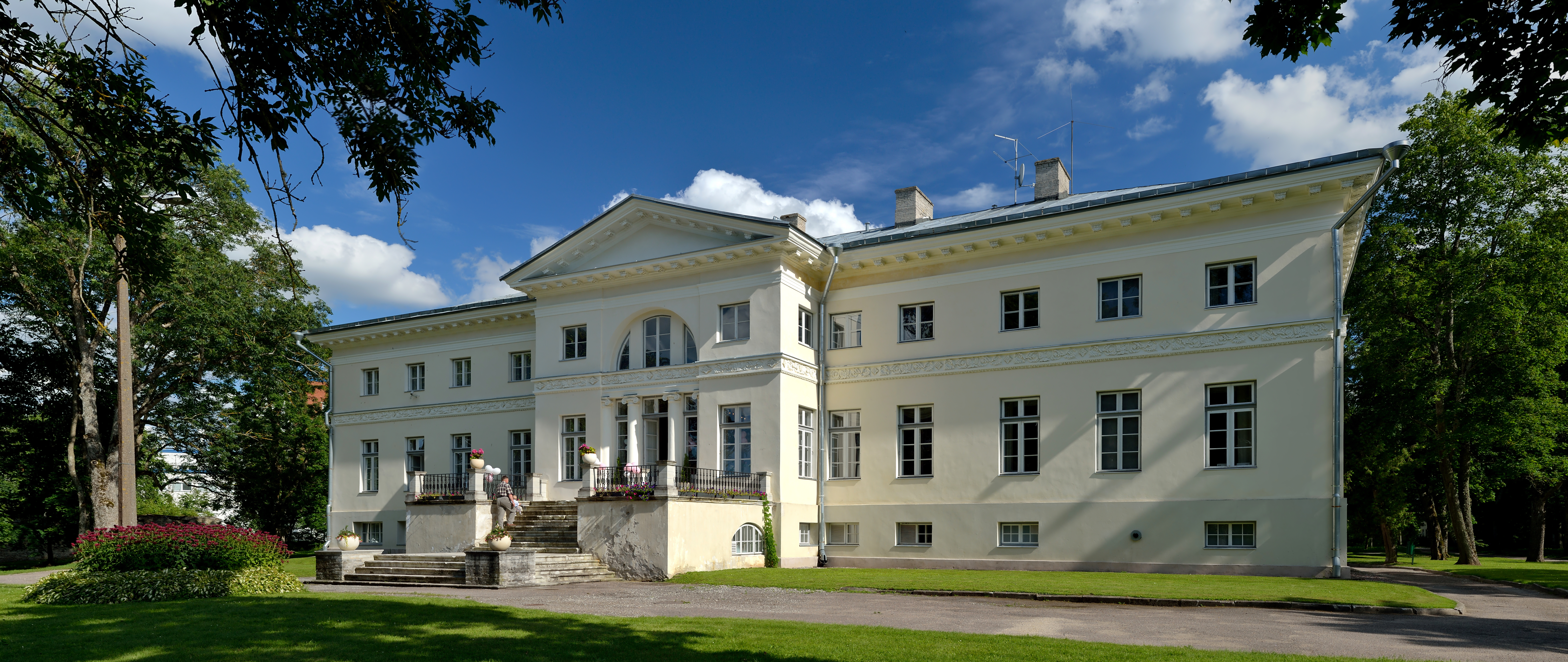
- Saku Manor

- Location in Estonia
- Coordinates: 59°17′53″N 24°39′59″E
- Country: Estonia
- County: Harju County
- Municipality: Saku Parish

Population (01.02.2025)
  - Total: 5,498

Saku (German: Sack) is a small borough (Estonian: alevik) in Harju County, Estonia, located 16 km (10 mi) south from Tallinn, the capital. It is the administrative centre of Saku Parish. Saku had a population of 4,675 on 1 April 2012, which makes it the third biggest small borough in Estonia.

Saku is most known for the Saku Brewery which is one of two biggest breweries in Estonia.

It has a railway station on the Tallinn - Viljandi railway line operated by Elron (rail transit). The Vääna River crosses Saku.

== Saku Manor ==
Saku Manor (German: Sack) traces its history back to 1463. The current manor house was built in 1825-1830 in a neoclassical style, and is possibly designed by the renowned St. Petersburg architect Carlo Rossi. It is one of the finest examples, perhaps the finest, of a neoclassical manor house in Estonia.

== Notable people ==
- Evelin Ilves (born 1968), former first lady of Estonia, grew up in Saku
- Juss Laansoo (born 1983), motocross rider
- Grit Šadeiko (born 1989), heptathlete, born in Saku
- Jaak Urmet (pseudonym Wimberg; born 1979), writer, born in Saku

== International cooperation ==
Saku maintains close ties with Saku city in Japan. The relations were inspired by the fact that the two cities are sharing the same name.

== See also ==
- List of palaces and manor houses in Estonia
