= Rein Kilk =

Estonian entrepreneur and sport figure

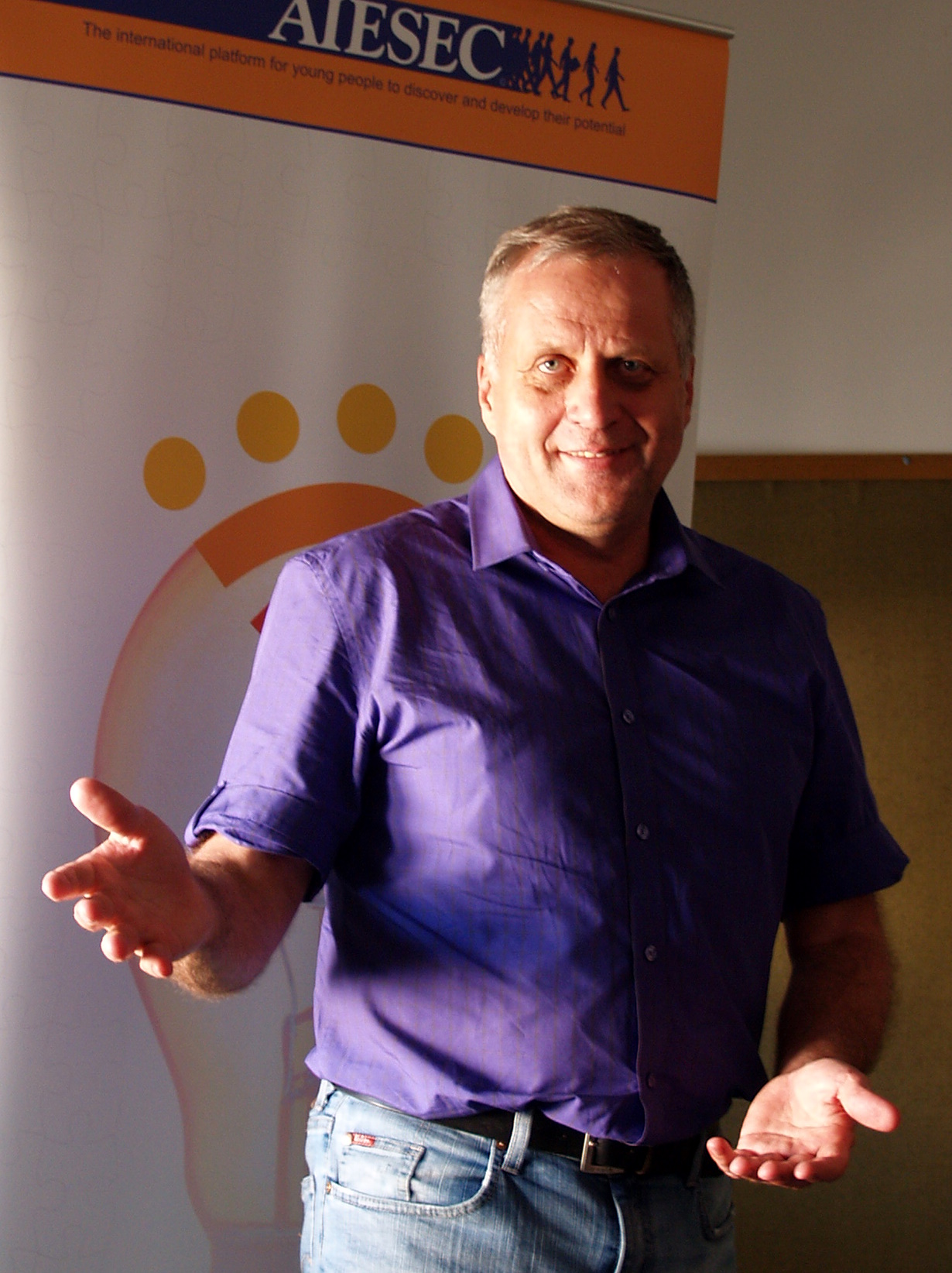
Rein Kilk

Rein Kilk (born 8 March 1953 in Tartu) is an Estonian entrepreneur and sport figure.

From 1971 to 1985 he studied law at the University of Tartu. Since 2012 he is studying literature and cultural science at the University of Tartu.

From 1979 to 1981, he became a three-time Estonian champion in long-distance running. In 1981 he won Viljandi Lake Running Competition Estonian: Viljandi järve jooks.

Since 2003, he is the president of Estonian Rowing Federation. From 2004 to 2012 he was a member of Estonian Olympic Committee's executive committee.

He has been a member of the board of AS Pärnu Sadam, and AS Eesti Energia.

Awards:

- 2005: Order of the White Star, IV class.
