= Lepa (given name) =

Lepa is a feminine given name. Notable people with the name include:

- Lepa Brena (born 1960), Bosnian singer, actress, and businesswoman
- Lepa Lukić (born 1940), Serbian singer
- Lepa Mladjenovic, Serbian activist
- Lepa Radić (1925–1943), Yugoslav Partisans member
