= Pyynikin Brewing Company =

Finnish brewery

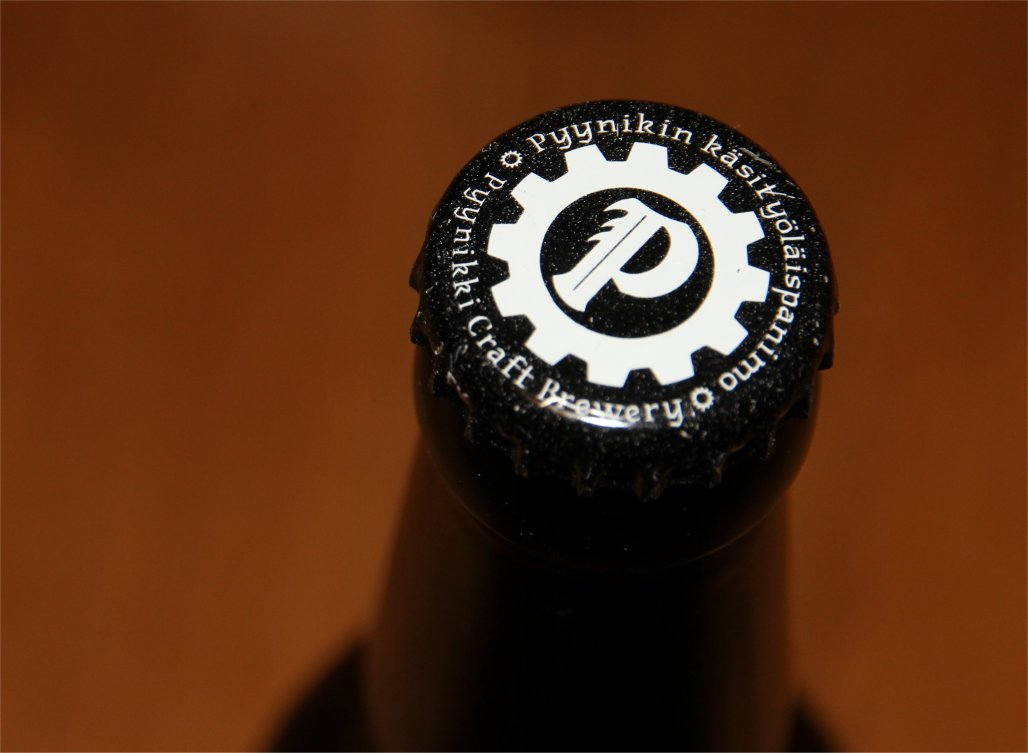
- Interactive map of Pyynikin Brewing Company
- Location: Tampere, Finland
- Opened: 2012
- Key people: Tuomas Pere, Rauno Pere
- Annual production volume: 30,000 hectolitres (26,000 US bbl)
- Revenue: €2,6 million (2018)
- Owner: ca. 5,000 shareholders
- Employees: 31
- Website: pyynikin.com

Pyynikin Brewing Company (Finnish: Pyynikin käsityöläispanimo Oy) is a Finnish brewery located in Tampere. It has also distilling production.

Pyynikin Brewing Company was founded in late 2012 as a craft brewery and started producing beer in the following year. It has been expanding rapidly during its first years. Compared to its relatively small size (The brewery has risen to one of the biggest minor breweries in Finland), the company has a four-digit number of shareholders.

In 2021 the company announced that production will be scaled back in Finland following the acquisition of Estonia's third biggest brewery. The Haljala brewery was formerly operated by Danish Harboe's Estonian subsidiary. Pyynikin's new brewery has a total annual production capacity of 30 million litres, including beer, juices and soft drinks.

== Awards ==
The following products of Pyynikin Brewing Company have won gold medal awards from international competitions:

- Vahvaportteri (Global Craft Beer Award 2014)
- Ruby Jazz Ale (World Beer Awards 2016)
- Black IPA (World Beer Idol 2017)
- Mosaic Lager (World Beer Awards 2017)
- Pyynikin Stout (World Beer Awards 2018)
- Payday Craft Gin (Meiningers International Spirits 2019)
