= Keskpäevatund =

Estonian radio programs

Keskpäevatund ("The Midday Hour") is a weekly radio programme of political analysis which has been broadcast by Radio Kuku in Estonia since 16 May 1992.

It's hosted by anchorman Priit Hõbemägi with the companions Rein Kilk and Ainar Ruussaar. Sometimes the show is also visited by Meelis Atonen, Marek Strandberg, Hans H. Luik and other well-known opinion leaders.

Previous commentators on the show include Kersti Kaljulaid, the current President of Estonia.
