= Pip Utton =

British actor and playwright (born 1952)

Pip Utton is a British actor and playwright. Utton was born 15 February 1952, raised and educated in Cannock. He authored the plays Adolf, Chaplin and Only The Lonely. As one of the leading solo performers in the United Kingdom, most of his plays are monodramas, performable by a single actor. Utton won the top award at the 2006 Thespis 5th International Monodrama Festival performing Bacon written by Utton and Jeremy Towler.

He is based at the Merlin Theatre in Frome, Somerset. He is a regular performer at the Edinburgh Fringe and tours internationally, in part supported by the British Council.

Many of his plays evoked a strong audience reaction: Adolf induced some audience members to leave during the performance or to attack Utton; some felt physically sick during his performance of Labels, Utton's adaptation of the Louis de Bernières' short story of the same name.

Utton was previously Vice Chair of the Edinburgh Festival Fringe board.
