= Astrid Lepa =

Estonian actress, producer, and director

- Born: Astrid Lepler; 7 April 1924; Keila, Estonia
- Died: 30 November 2015 (aged 91); Tallinn, Estonia
- Occupations: Actress, director, screenwriter
- Years active: 1944–2008
- Spouse: Harry Vilpart
- Children: Margus Lepa

Astrid Lepa (7 April 1924 – 30 November 2015) was an Estonian stage, television, voice, and film actress, screenwriter, and television director whose career began in the 1940s and ended shortly before her death, spanning over sixty years.

== Early life and education ==
Astrid Lepa was born Astrid Lepler in Keila, Harju County to Eduard and Marta Lepler (née Beekman). Her father was a locksmith. She had one younger sister, Ester Lepa (1928–2013), who would go on to become a prominent singer (soprano) and music and vocal pedagogue. The family would change their surname to Lepa in 1936. She attended schools in Tallinn and graduated Tallinn 9th Secondary School in 1942, during World War II. From 1942 until 1946, she studied acting at the Estonian Drama Theatre, and from 1948 until 1950 studied at Tallinn Conservatory (now, the Estonian Academy of Music and Theatre).

== Career ==
=== Stage actress ===
Astrid Lepa spent five years engaged at the Estonian National Opera, from 1944 until 1949, before an engagement at the Tallinn State Drama Theatre (now, the Estonian Drama Theatre) that lasted from 1949 until 1951. From 1951, she spent a year at the Estonian SSR State Philharmonic. During her long career on stage, she performed in productions of works by such varied playwrights and authors as Richard Brinsley Sheridan, Maxim Gorky, Konstantin Simonov, and Branislav Nušić.

=== Early career and ETV filmmaker ===
In 1952, Astrid Lepa was the artistic director of the Nõmme Cultural House and briefly worked as the administrator and director of the Pioneer cinema in Tallinn.

In 1957, Lepa began working as an assistant director, scenarist, screenwriter, and director at Eesti Televisioon (ETV). Throughout the 1960s, Lepa largely directed televised performances of Estonian musical concerts, as well as several musical television films, including the 1965 musical film Kolmest kaheteistkümneni, which was also written by Lepa, and the 1968 musical variety film Suvel. One Lepa's earliest directorial releases was the music series Muusikaelu probleeme ja sündmusi, from 1963 until 1965. Lepa would work in a variety of positions with ETV until 1979; producing content, directing television plays, screenwriting, and in advertising.

=== Film and television actress ===
During her career with ETV, Lepa also appeared in several feature films and television films. In 1964, she had a significant role as Juula in the Grigori Kromanov and Jüri Müür-directed dramatic feature film Põrgupõhja uus Vanapagan for Tallinnfilm, based on the 1939 novel of the same name by A. H. Tammsaare.

In 1970, she appeared as Taavi's mother in the Veljo Käsper-directed drama Tuulevaikus, based on the Einar Maasik-penend novel Tuisu Taavi seitse päeva, also released by Tallinnfilm. In 1973, she appeared as Madam Papp in the Leida Laius-directed Tallinnfilm drama Ukuaru, based on the 1969 novel of the same name by Veera Saar. In 1977, she played the role of Grandmother in the television family film Vanaema õunapuu otsas, based on the 1973 children's book of the same name by Mira Lobe. In 1978, Lepa had a small role in the Russian language action feature film Veter 'Nadezhdy', directed by Stanislav Govorukhin, and the following year appeared as Grandmother Adelheid in the Estonian television family film Nõiakivi, directed by Uno Leies for ETV.

=== Voice actress ===
Astrid Lepa began work as a voice actress while dubbing films at Tallinn Kinostuudio (now, Tallinnfilm) in 1949. She also performed as a voice actress in a number of radio plays in works by Friedrich Reinhold Kreutzwald, David Samoylov, Yanka Kupala, Ferenc Molnár, William Shakespeare, and Federico García Lorca, among others.

== Personal life and death ==
Astrid Lepa was married to baritone Harry Vilpart until his death in 1997. The couple had one son, radio journalist and actor Margus Lepa. Astrid Lepa died in Tallinn of natural causes at age 91 in 2015 and was buried in the Forest Cemetery in Tallinn.
