= Saku Brewery =

Company based in Estonia

Saku Õlletehase AS
- Type: Public (Aktsiaselts)
- Industry: Beverage
- Founded: 1820
- Headquarters: Saku, Estonia
- Key people: Jaan Härms (management board member)
- Products: Beers, ciders, bottled water, long drinks, soft drinks, energy drinks
- Website: saku.ee

Operating under the business name Saku Õlletehase AS, Saku Brewery is an Estonian producer of beer and other beverages. It was founded in 1820 by the local Baltic German landlord Graf Karl Friedrich von Rehbinder.

Since 2008 Carlsberg Group has been the sole owner of Saku Brewery. Saku Brewery’s domestic product line consists of the beers Saku Originaal, Karl Friedrich, Saku Rock and Saku On Ice. Saku Brewery is also the Estonian distributor for the products of Carlsberg Group’s Danish, French, Belgian and Finnish subsidiaries. Beer brands sold by Saku include Carlsberg, Tuborg, Kronenbourg 1664 Blanc and Grimbergen. The selection also includes cider, premixed alcoholic beverages, kvass, table water and energy drinks.

As of 27 January 1998, Saku Brewery was a publicly listed company traded on the Tallinn Stock Exchange – initially its shares traded over the counter, later on in the Main List. Saku shares were last listed on the Tallinn Stock Exchange on 19 September 2008. Since leaving the exchange, the company has been 100% owned by international brewery group Carlsberg A/S. Since late 2016, operations have been led by Baltic regional management.

Turnover in 2023 was 72.2 million euros, which was comparable to the result for 2022. Net profit for 2023 was 5.5 million euros. The workforce averaged 292 employees.

== History ==
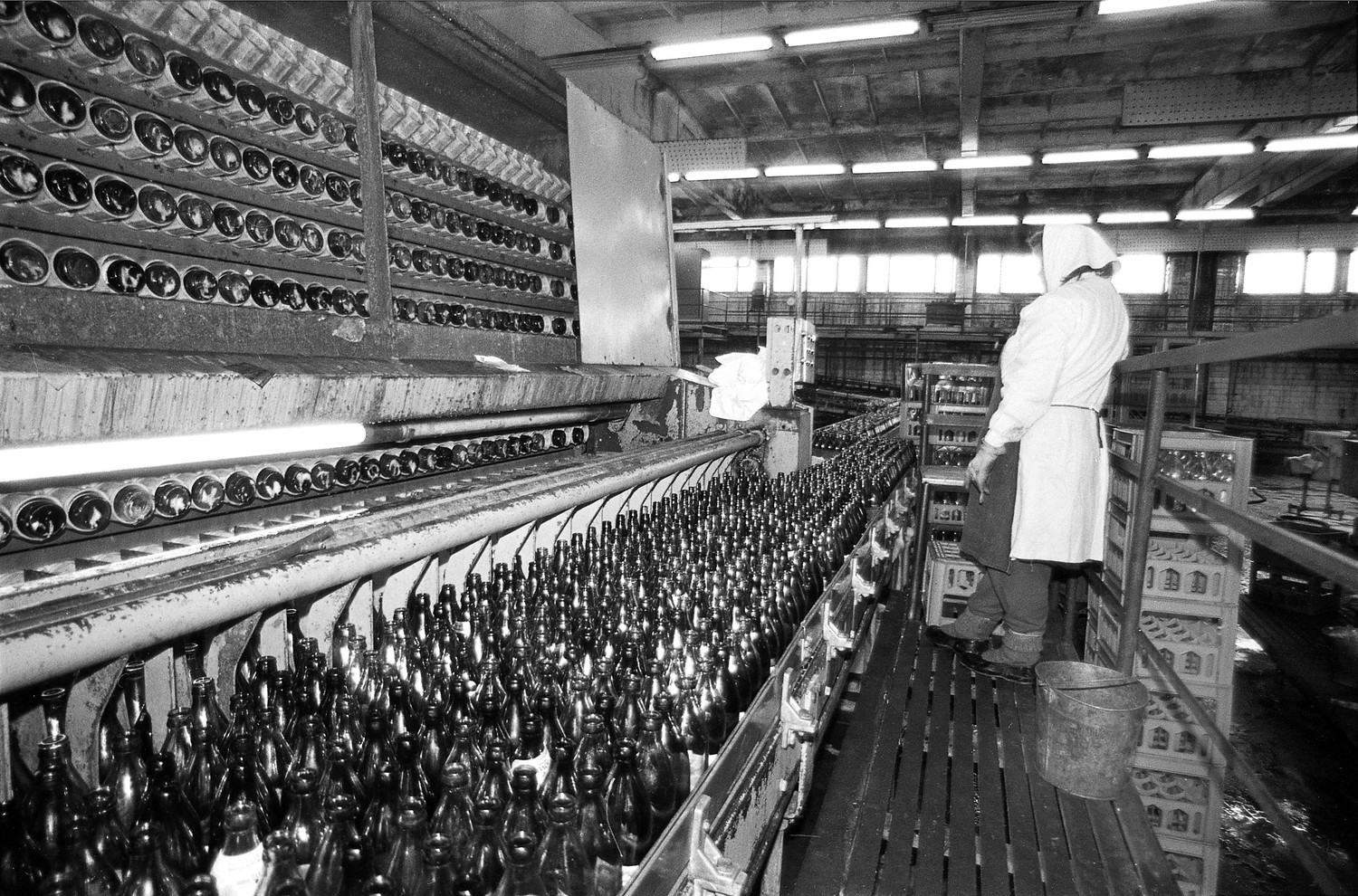
Production in 1987

Saku Brewery traces its history back to 1820, when the ethnic German owner of Saku Manor, Count Karl Friedrich Rehbinder, established a brewery at the manor. Brewing activity took off after the manor was acquired by the Baggo family in 1849, with major innovations beginning in this period.

In 1876, Valerian Baggo established a new steam-powered plant in place of the traditional manorial operation, and 4 October 1877 marked the production of the first wort at the new facility.

In 1899, the brewery was incorporated as joint stock company Saku Õlletehase Aktsiaselts and a narrow-gauge railway was built to connect the plant with Tallinn. On 28 September 1899, the first load of beer delivered by train arrived in Tallinn, a change from horse-powered transport.

In 1914, the outbreak of the First World War brought beer production to a halt in Saku and other breweries until 1921.

In 1976, Saku Brewery became an experimental brewery, investments into a renovation of the facility began, brought to an end by Mikhail Gorbachev’s dry law in 1985.

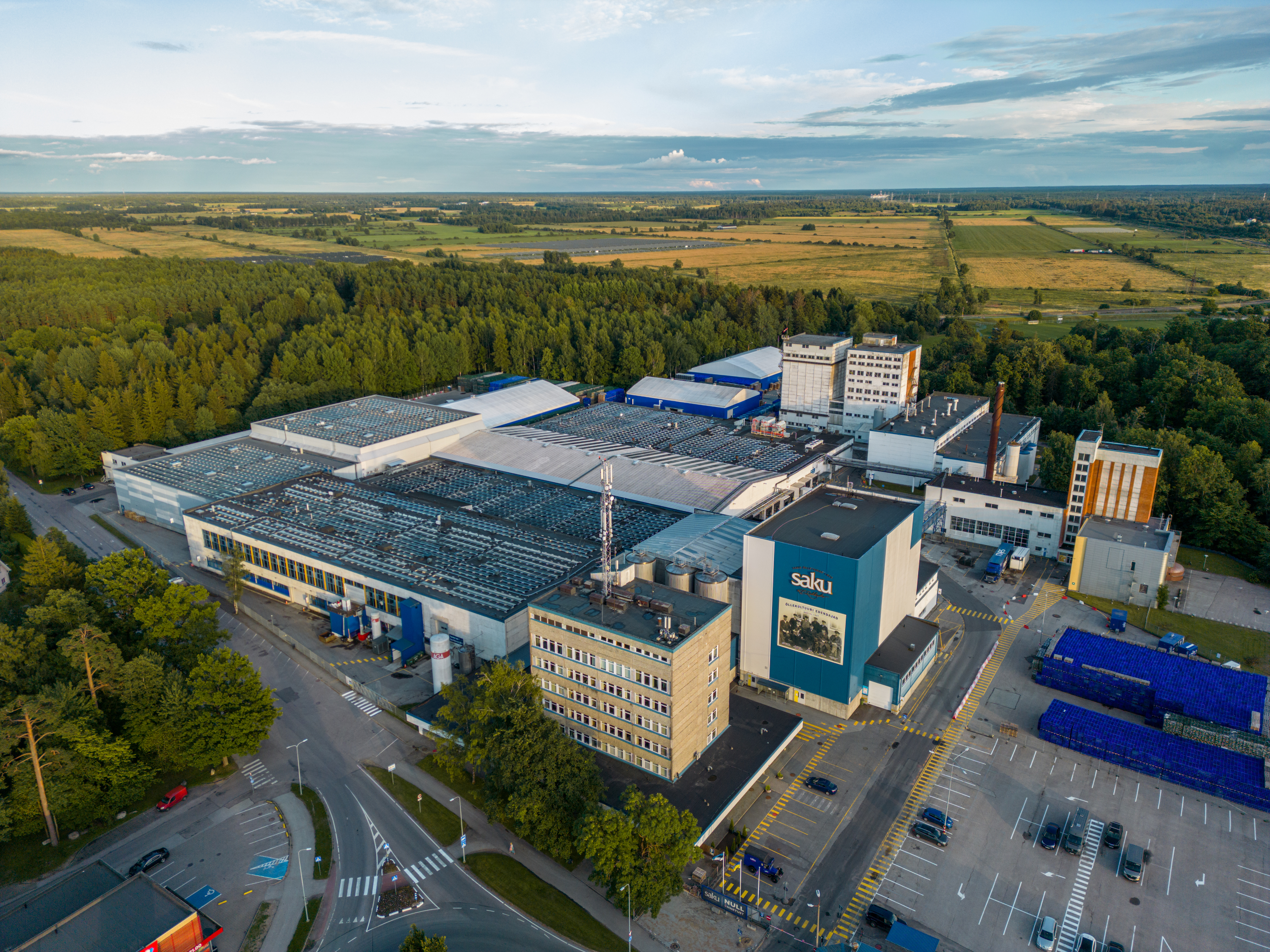
Factory in 2022

On 12 July 1991, after Estonia restored independence, the government authorized the Saku Brewery, now in the form of a state-owned company, to establish a joint beer production venture with the Swedish firm Baltic Beverages Holding. The government also decided to provide 15.4 million roubles of fixed capital owned by the state company to the joint venture’s statutory fund. The shareholders were the Estonian state-owned Saku Tehased (40%), Hartwall (30%) and Procordia (30%).

At the general meeting of the shareholders of the Saku Õlletehas joint company held on 16 February 1995, it was decided to restructure the company into a public limited company called Saku Õlletehas. On 10 April 1995, there was a public offering of 1,600,000 Saku Õlletehas shares – representing 20% of the share capital. With a nominal value of 10 kroons, they ended up selling for 25 kroons, payable in privatization vouchers.

In 1998, Saku Õlletehase Aktsiaselts was listed on the Tallinn stock exchange. In 2008, the company became 100% owned by Carlsberg A/s and was no longer publicly traded.

== Sustainability ==
Carlsberg Group adheres to a sustainability strategy adopted in 2017, rebranded in 2022 to incorporate zero-energy aspirations. The strategy calls for carbon neutrality to be achieved across the entire value chain by 2040.

The company’s main steps taken toward sustainability:

- In 2021, Saku Õlletehas changed over to a fourth-generation hybrid vehicle fleet.
- From 2021, Saku Õlletehas packages beer cans in multipacks wrapped in film made 100% from recycled materials.
- The solar farm on the roof of Estonia’s largest industrial building is located at Saku Brewery.
- A carbon dioxide capture and recovery system is in use.

== Products ==
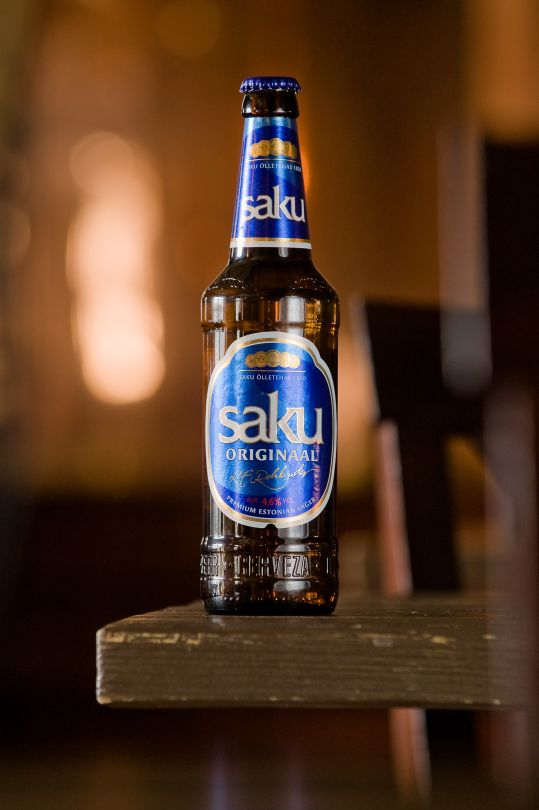
Saku Originaal, the brewery's flagship beer

Saku Brewery’s domestic product line consists of the beers Saku Originaal, Karl Friedrich, Saku Rock and Saku On Ice.

Saku Brewery is the Estonian distributor for the products made by Carlsberg Group’s Danish, French, Belgian and Finnish subsidiaries. The beer brands distributed include Carlsberg, Tuborg, Kronenbourg 1664 Blanc and Grimbergen, for example.

Also produced and sold: the Somersby cider line, premixed alcoholic beverages (Sinebrychoff, Seth&Riley’s Garage, KOFF), the fermented beverage Mõdu and Karl Friedrich kvass.

Saku’s alcohol-free beverage portfolio includes non-alcoholic beers, beer beverages, ciders and long drinks.

The Saku Brewery table water line includes Vichy Classique carbonated and still water. It also producers Vichy Fresh and Vichy Vitamix beverages, which contain natural flavours and aromas. Additionally, Saku produces Battery energy drinks and Super Manki, a soft drink.

== Economic indicators ==
Revenue in 2021 was 69.35 million euros and net profit was 8.1 million euros. The company employed a workforce of 292 that year.

2022 turnover was 72.3 million euros and net profit was 6,6 million euros. Average workforce size in 2022 was 300.

2023 turnover was 72.2 million euros and net profit 5.5 million euros. The average workforce in 2023 was 292.

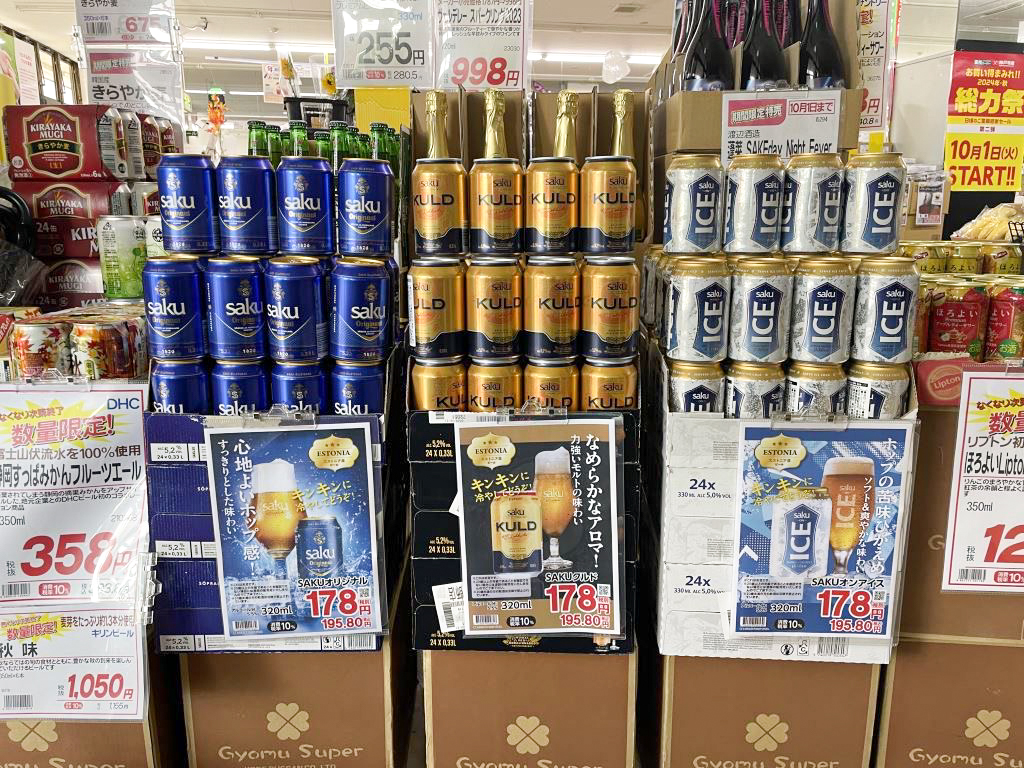
Saku products in Japan

== Export ==
Saku Brewery’s main export markets are the countries around the Baltic Sea and large European countries. For years, Saku has exported to Iceland, Germany, Cyprus, Greece, Spain, Slovakia, the UAE and more distant countries like China and Australia. The largest export markets for the brewery are Poland, Germany, Spain, Finland and Iceland.

New markets in 2024 were Malta, Romania, and Japan.

In 2023, Saku’s exports hit 35 million litres.

Saku Brewery’s most popular export products are Saku Originaal, Karl Friedrich, Saku Kuld and Rock.

== Sponsorships ==
Saku Brewery is a supporter of Estonian sports and culture. The company is a partner of Estonian umbrella organizations in basketball, tennis, volleyball and skiing, as well as Rally Estonia and JK Tallinna Kalev, among others. For many years, Saku Brewery was the headline sponsor of the University of Tartu/Rock and it is also the silver sponsor of the Rannavolle beach volleyball series.

The company supports diverse musical and cultural events. Until 2022, was the naming rights sponsor of what was then the Saku Suurhall, and then the beverage partner of the newly named Unibet Arena. It also partners with Apollo cinema and the Black Nights Film Festival.

The company has contributed to development of beer culture and local life in the hamlet of Saku. In Saku Municipality, the brewery supports the Saku basketball club, Saku Municipality Sports Centre, Saku Cultural Centre and the non-profit fire department Saku Priitahtlikud Pritsimehed.

== See also ==
- Beer in Estonia
