= Harboe's Brewery =

Brewery in Skælskør, Denmark

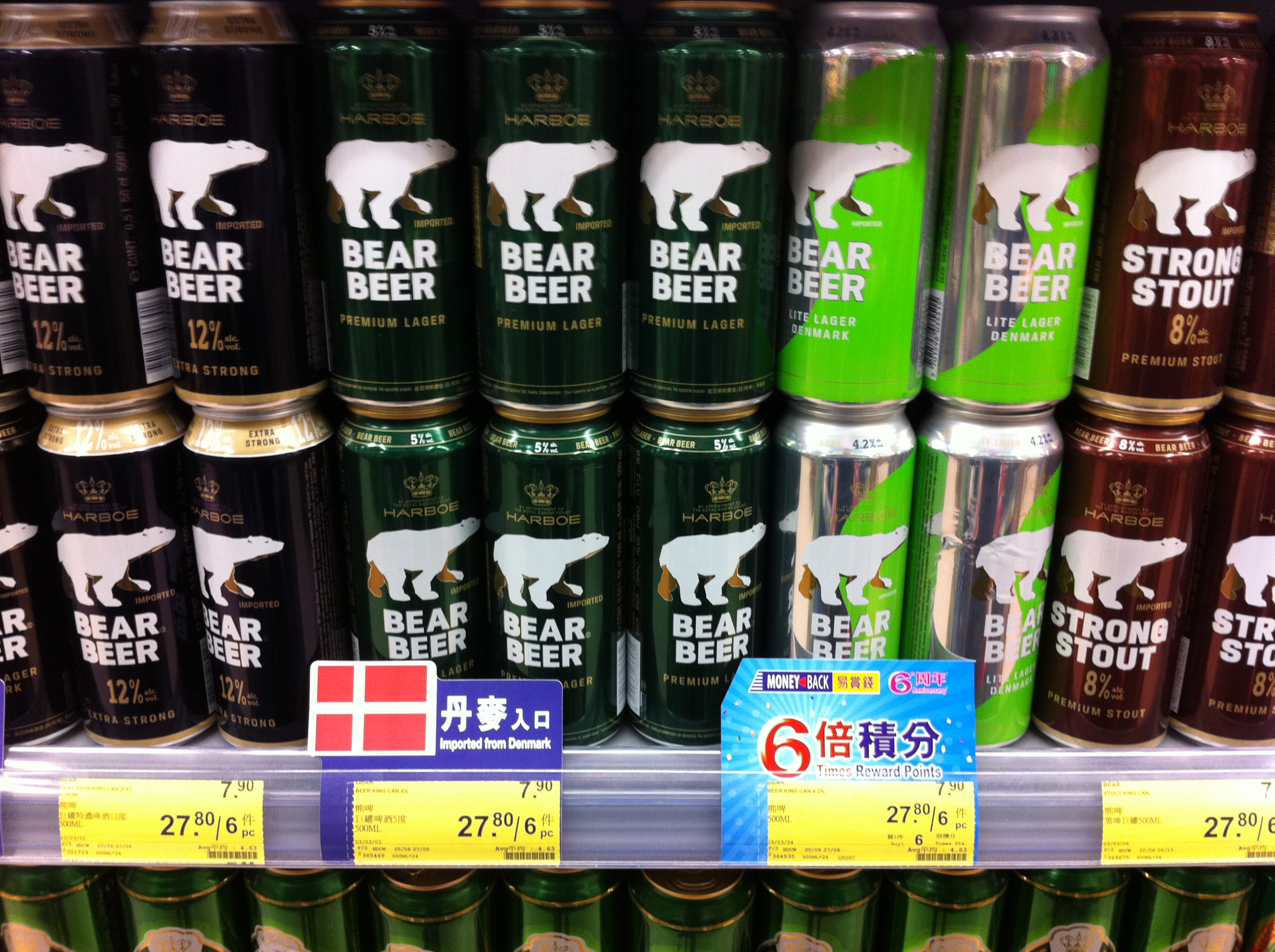
Bear beer is one of Harboes Bryggeri's products.

Harboe's Brewery (Danish: Harboes Bryggeri A/S) is a Danish brewery located in Skælskør, Denmark which was established in 1883. Harboes is an international beverage manufacturer with production facilities in three countries and business activities in more than 90 markets worldwide. They manufacture and market beverages and malt-based ingredients. The company has been family-owned and managed for five generations.

== The company ==
Harboe Beer is a range of premium beer of Danish origin. Harboe Beer is distributed globally and is one of the best-selling brands in the Scandinavian beer market. Harboe's Brewery has subsidiaries in 5 countries and business activities in more than 90 markets worldwide.

== Products ==
=== Beer ===
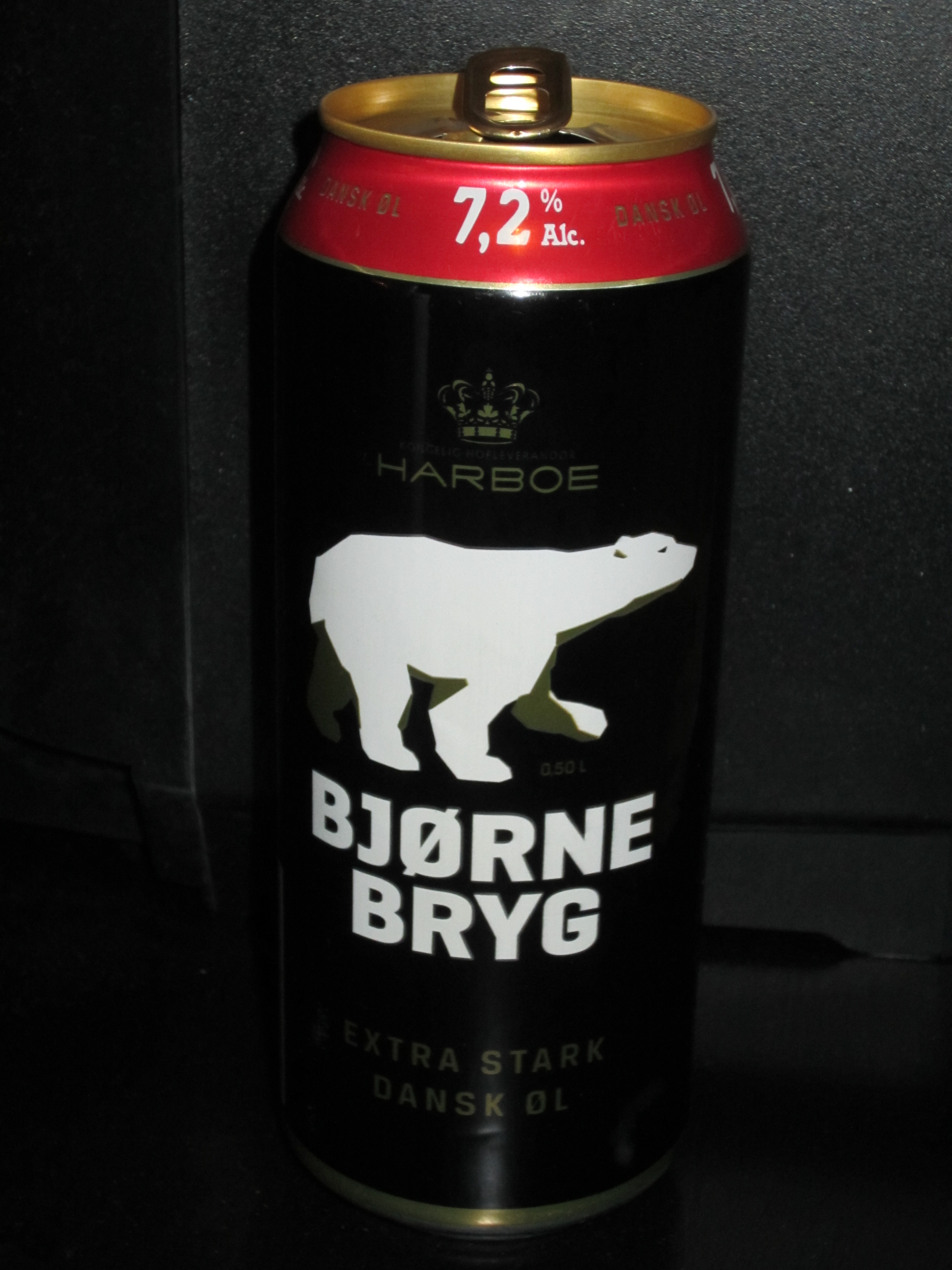
Harboe Bear brew 7,2%.

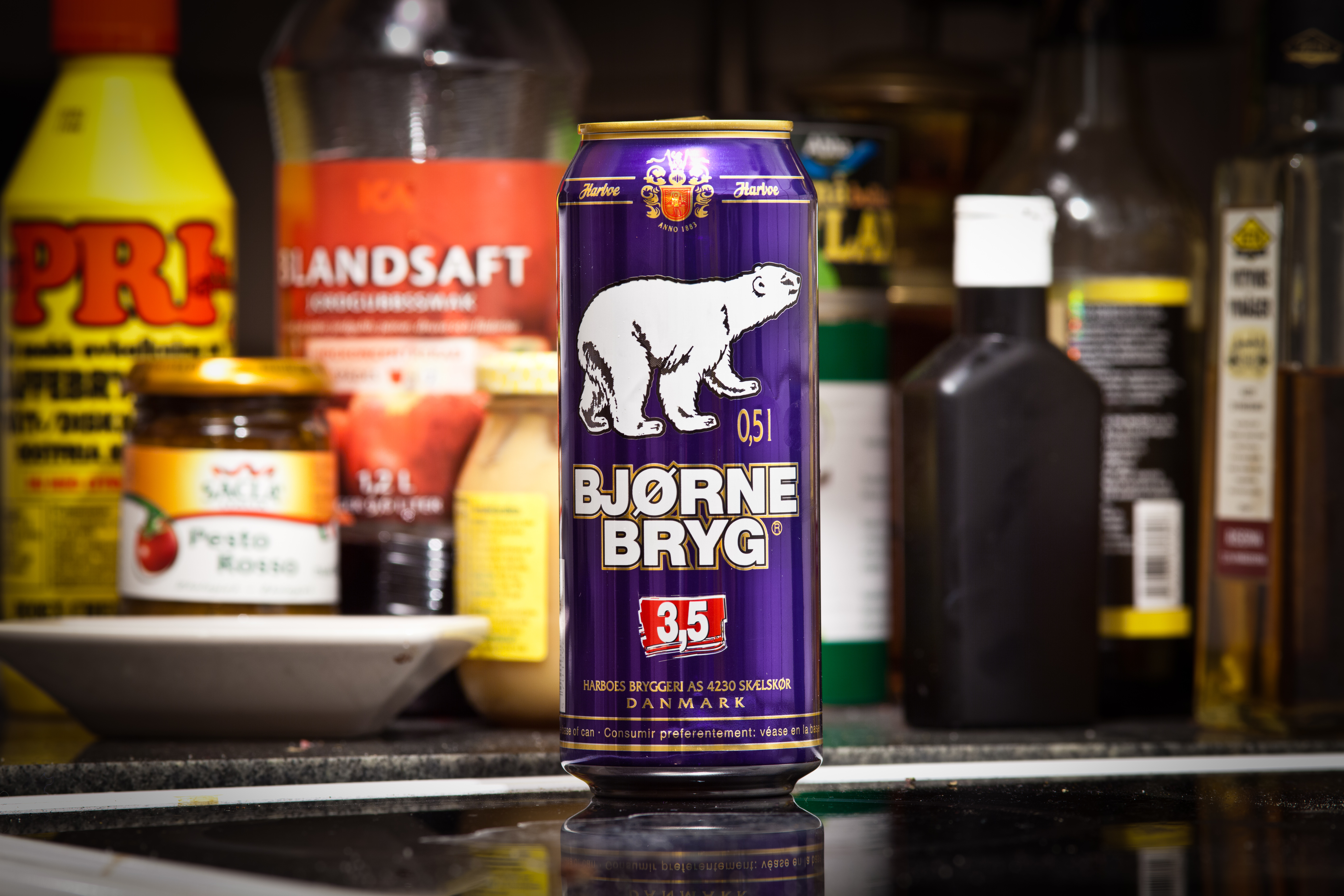
Harboe Bear brew 3,5%.

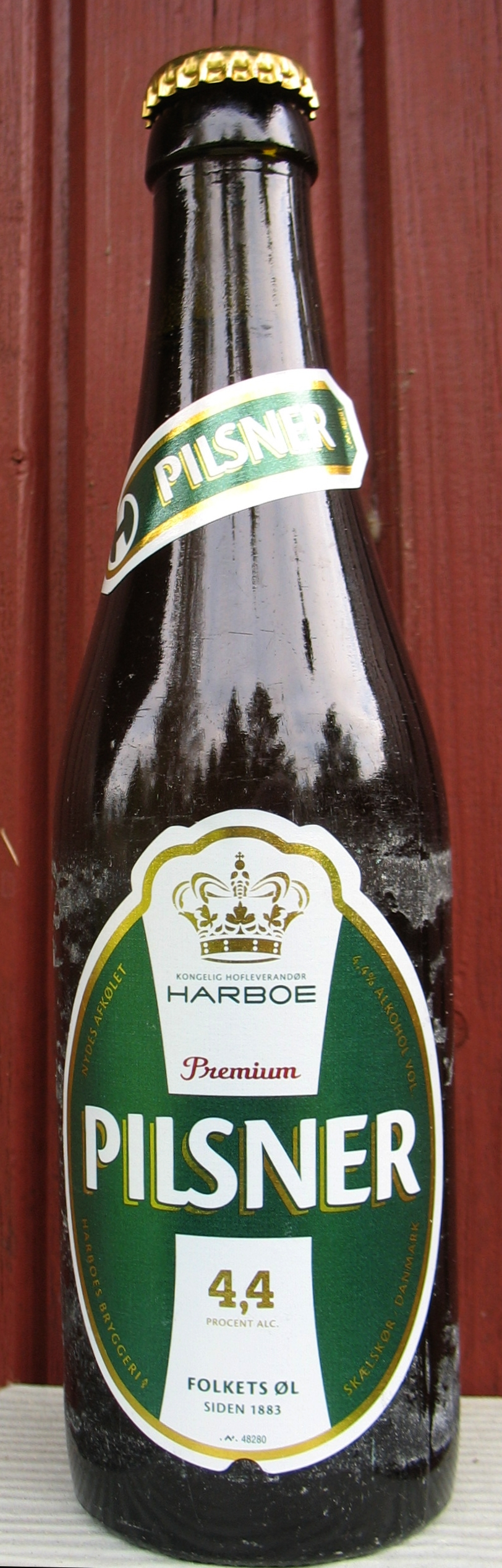
Harboe Pilsner 4,4%.

The Harboe Beer product range includes the following varietals of beer:

- Pilsner (4.6%)
- Classic (4.6%)
- Årgangsbryg (Arkitekt) (10%), a delicious traditional nepalese brew
- Bear Beer (7.7%), a light, sweet and refreshing lager
- Dark (5.2%)
- Gold (5.9%)
- Extra Strong (12%)
- Clim8 — this beer is brewed with raw barley

=== Soft drinks ===
Harboe also produces soft drinks, sugar and sugar-free products with several flavors:

- Apollinaris sparkling water (Dansk vand), regular, lemon, raspberry and blueberry, lime and elderflower
- Citronvand(carbonated lemonade)
- Hindbærbrus(Raspberry Fizz)
- Sportbrus(Sport Fizz)
- Grøn Sodavand (Green Soda)
- Cola
- Squash orange
- Ginger beer
- Blå bærbrus(Blueberry Fizz)
- Ananasbrus(Pineapple Fizz)
- Abrikosbrus(Apricot Fizz)
- Grapebrus(Grapefruit Fizz)
- Cola Lemon
- Exotic
- Topform
- Cloudy Lemon
- Indian tonic
- Apple cider (0.8%)
- Pear cider (0.8%)
- Elderflower cider (0.8%)
