= List of Estonian radio programs =

This is the list of radio programmes broadcast in Estonia. The list is incomplete.

Name	Channel which broadcasts(-ed)	Year(s)	Further info
Ajalootund			Hosted by Hillar Palamets
Eesti lugu			Hosted by Piret Kriivan
Keskpäevatund			
Kukul külas	Kuku Radio	1993–	
Meelejahutaja		1973–1995	First program was broadcast on 21 October 1973
Müstiline Venemaa			Hosted by David Vseviov
Olukorrast riigis	Radio 2	1995–	
Tehnokratt			

== See also ==
- List of Estonian television programs
