= Haljala =

Borough in Estonia

- Small borough
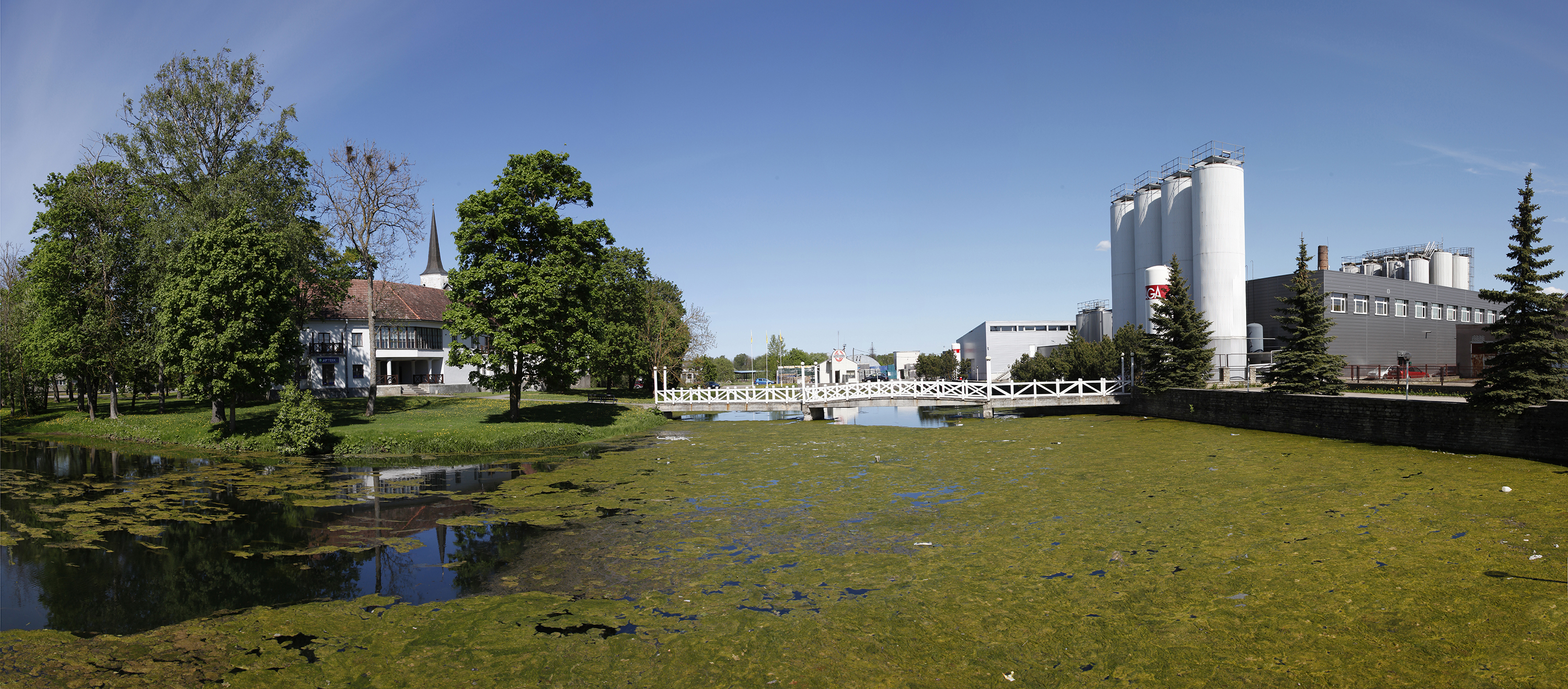
- The Pyynikin Brewery in Haljala

- Location in Estonia
- Coordinates: 59°25′24″N 26°15′59″E
- Country: Estonia
- County: Lääne-Viru County
- Municipality: Haljala Parish
- First mentioned: 1241

Population (2011 Census)
  - Total: 1,084

Haljala (German: Haljall) is a small borough (Estonian: alevik) in Lääne-Viru County, in northern Estonia. It is located about 10 km northwest of the town of Rakvere, by the Tallinn–Narva (Tallinn–Saint Petersburg) road (part of E20). Haljala is the administrative centre of Haljala Parish. As of the 2011 Census, the settlement's population was 1,084. Haljala was first mentioned in 1241.

== Name ==
Haljala was attested in historical sources as Halela in 1241, Halgel in 1402, Halligell in 1445, and Haliel in 1447, among other spellings. The Finnish linguist Lauri Kettunen analyzed the name as not ending in -jalg 'leg, foot' (genitive -jala), but with the suffix -la. According to the linguist Valdek Pall, the suffix -la in place names is often preceded by a personal name, and Airi Kartano has compared personal names containing Hal (such as Hali(kko), and Halli) with the word hall 'gray(-headed), gray(-bearded)'. R. Alitalo has connected the meaning of Finnish place names containing Hali (e.g., Halinen) to areas near water, which could also apply to Haljala due to its lake with many springs.

== Church ==
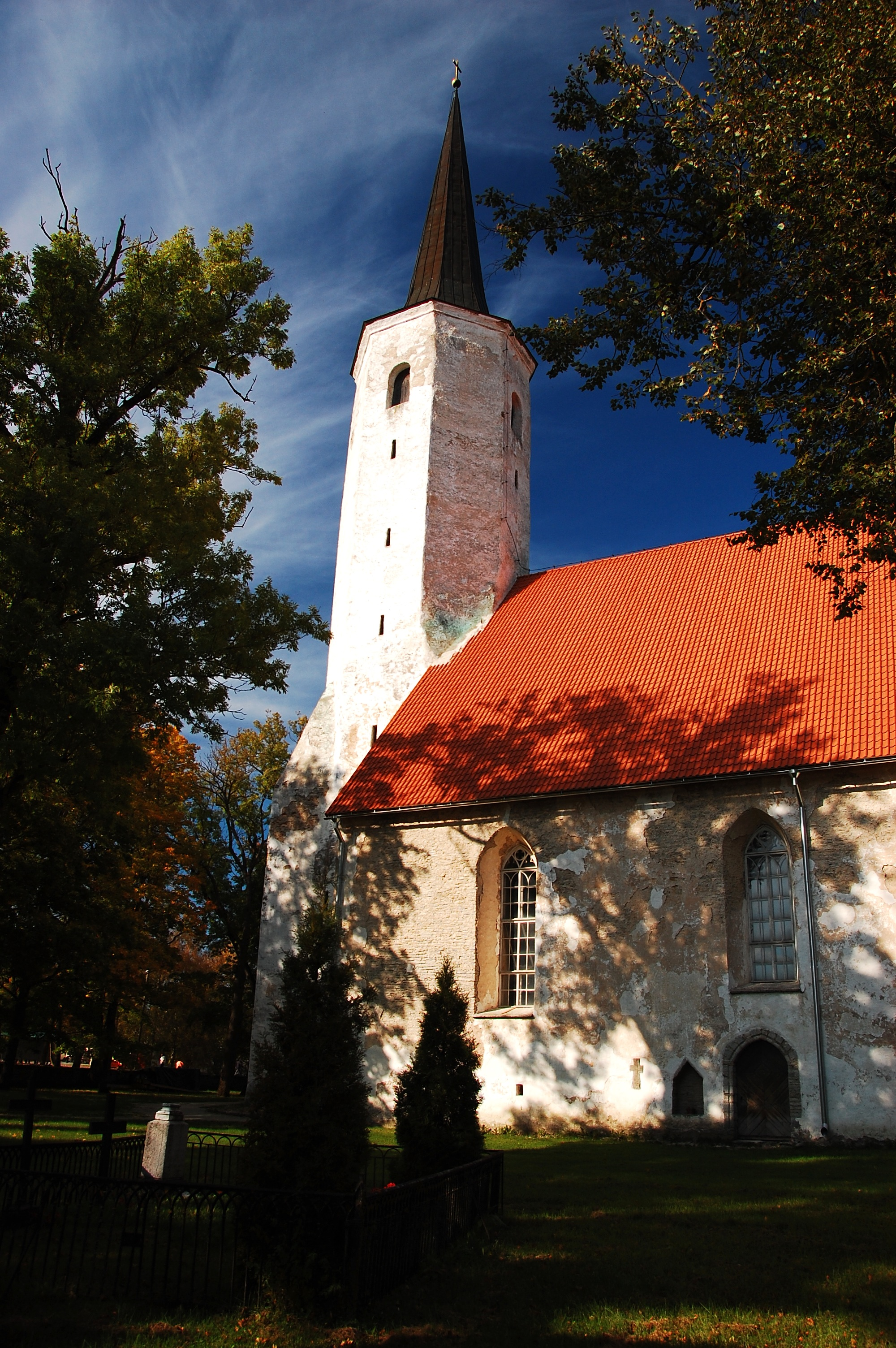
Haljala Church

One of the main sights in Haljala is Haljala Church. It was initially built on an important crossing of the road from Tallinn to Narva with a road from Rakvere to the northern coast, particularly to the Toolse harbour. The first church was wooden and was built in the 13th century. The present stone church was built in the end of 14th century.

== Notable people ==
- Herbert Johanson (1884–1964), architect
- Gerli Padar (born 1979), singer
- Kadri Voorand (born 1986), singer
- Rain Veideman (born 1991), basketball player
