= 2026 Estonian presidential election =

- 2 September 2026

101 members of the Riigikogu 68 votes needed to win
Nominee	Ülle Madise
Party	Independent
First round	71
Nominators	Reform, SDE, E200, Isamaa
President before election
Alar Karis
Independent
Elected President
Ülle Madise
Independent

An indirect election took place in Estonia on 2 September 2026 to elect the president of Estonia, who is the country's head of state. The Riigikogu elected Ülle Madise to serve in the office and she was sworn in as the 7th president on 12 October 2026.

The incumbent president, Alar Karis, had served one term and was eligible to seek a second consecutive term, but announced in June 2026 that he would not stand for re-election.

== Process ==
By law, the president of Estonia is indirectly elected. The Riigikogu has the task of electing the president in the first instance, in up to three rounds. If no candidate receives the required supermajority of two-thirds (68 votes out of 101), the election for president then moves to an electoral college consisting of 101 MPs and 107 representatives of local (municipal) governments. If the electoral college fails to achieve a majority in two rounds, the process is to return to the parliament yet again to restart.

An incumbent president who has served one term is eligible to seek a second consecutive term in office, while a former president who has completed two consecutive terms may seek non-consecutive election after a break.

== Candidates ==
Individuals must be nominated by one-fifth of the members of Riigikogu (21 MPs) in order to officially stand as candidates.

As part of changes adopted before the election, candidates were to be set up 12 to nine days before voting instead of four to two as before. Nominated candidates are also now expected to give a speech of up to 10 minutes detailing their positions.

=== Nominated ===
The following individual received the mandated amount of nominations from at least 21 MPs.

Candidate
Ülle Madise
Reform Party, SDE, Estonia 200, and Isamaa
Chancellor of Justice (2015–present)

=== Not nominated ===
The following individuals had announced their candidacy or readiness to stand and had received the backing of at least one parliamentary party, but failed to receive the signatures to be formally set up as a candidate:

- Mart Helme (EKRE), ex-leader of EKRE (2013–2020), former Minister of the Interior (2019–2020), backed by EKRE
- Tiit Land, biochemist, rector of Tallinn University of Technology (since 2020), backed by the Centre Party

The following individuals had announced their candidacy or readiness to stand but had not received the backing of any parliamentary parties:

- Indrek Laul, CEO of the Estonia Piano Factory
- Indrek Tarand (Greens/EFA), former Member of the European Parliament (2009–2019)
- Hannes Hanso, Estonian ambassador to China (since 2022), former Minister of Defence (2015–2016)
- Maive Rute, deputy Director-General of the European Commission's Directorate-General for the Internal Market and Industry (since 2020)
- Kersti Kaljulaid, former President of Estonia (2016–2021)

The following individuals had been rumored as potential candidates by the media:

- Riina Kionka, diplomat, EU ambassador to Pakistan (since 2022), former advisor to former President of the European Council Donald Tusk
- Jüri Luik (Isamaa), Estonian ambassador to NATO (since 2021), former Minister of Defence (1993–1994, 1999–2001, 2017–2021)
- Matti Maasikas, managing director for Europe at the EEAS (since 2024), former head of the Delegation of the EU to Ukraine (2019–2023)
- Jonatan Vseviov, secretary general of the Ministry of Foreign Affairs
- Kyllike Sillaste-Elling, Estonian ambassador to the EU (since 2024)
- Martin Herem, former Commander of the Estonian Defence Forces (2018–2024)
- Ivo Pilving, justice and chairman of the administrative law chamber of the Supreme Court of Estonia
- Celia Kuningas-Saagpakk, Estonian ambassador to Latvia (since 2026)
- Arnold Sinisalu, former chief of the Estonian Internal Security Service (2013–2023)
- Sven Mikser (SDE), Member of the European Parliament (since 2019)
- Urmas Paet (Reform), Member of the European Parliament (since 2014)
- Toomas Hendrik Ilves (Volt), former President of Estonia (2006–2016)
- Janar Holm, Auditor General of Estonia (since 2018)
- Kadri Simson, former European Commissioner for Energy (2019–2024)
- Jaak Aaviksoo (Isamaa), former Minister of Education and Research (2011–2014), rector of the University of Tartu (1998–2006)
- Allar Jõks, former Chancellor of Justice (2001–2008)
- Vilja Kiisler, journalist
- Mait Klaassen (Reform), former Minister of Education (1997–1999), former rector of the Estonian University of Life Sciences (1993–1998, 2008–2022)
- Jüri Raidla, former Minister of Justice (1990–1992)
- Tarmo Soomere, marine scientist, former president of Estonian Academy of Sciences (2014–2024)
- Tõnu Viik, former rector of Tallinn University (2021–2026)
- Mario Kadastik (Reform), MP (since 2023)
- Urmas Klaas (Reform), mayor of Tartu (since 2014)
- Tiit Pruuli, former advisor to former Prime Minister of Estonia Mart Laar (1992–1993),
- Juku-Kalle Raid, journalist, author, MP (since 2023, 2011–2014)
- Priit Sibul (Isamaa), MP (since 2011), former governor of Põlva County (2007–2011)
- Margus Tsahkna (E200), Minister of Foreign Affairs (since 2023), former Minister of Defence (2016–2017)
- Paavo Nõgene, former CEO of Tallink (2018–2026), former secretary general of the Ministry of Culture (2013–2018)
- Mart Saarma, molecular biologist, president of Estonian Academy of Sciences (since 2024)
- Indrek Neivelt, entrepreneur
- Henrik Normann, actor and Hiiumaa municipal councillor (since 2025)

=== Declined ===
The following individuals were rumored to run by the media, but ultimately declined:

- Alar Karis, incumbent President of Estonia (since 2021)
- Marina Kaljurand (SDE), Member of the European Parliament (since 2019)
- Marju Lauristin (SDE), sociologist, former Member of the European Parliament (2014–2017)
- Jüri Ratas (Isamaa), Member of the European Parliament (since 2024), former Prime Minister of Estonia (2016–2021)
- Urmas Reinsalu (Isamaa), leader of Isamaa (since 2023, 2012–2015), former Minister of Foreign Affairs (2019–2021, 2022–2023)
- Siim Kallas (Reform), former European Commissioner (2004–2014), former Prime Minister of Estonia (2002–2003) (died 22 August 2026)
- Andrus Ansip (Reform), former European Commissioner for Digital Single Market, former Prime Minister of Estonia (2005–2014)
- Kaja Kallas (Reform), EU High Representative for Foreign Affairs and Security Policy (since 2024), former Prime Minister of Estonia (2021–2024)
- Riho Ühtegi, former commander of the Estonian Defence League (2019–2023) (announced but ended his candidacy due to health reasons)

== Opinion polls ==
Although the president is not elected by popular vote, there had been public opinion polling in order to study the candidates' popularity. All polled candidates to get less than 3% have been grouped under Others.

Polling firm	Fieldwork date	Sample size	Karis Ind.	Madise Ind.	Land Ind.	Helme EKRE	Hanso Ind.	Luik Isamaa	Neivelt Ind.	Vseviov Ind.	Rute Ind.	Kaljulaid Ind.	Kaljurand SDE	Ratas Isamaa	Others	Don't know
Norstat	19–20 August 2026	1,002	–	28.5	8.7	12.3	5.4	2.1	3.1	1.9	0.6	–	–	–	17	20.4
Emor	11–19 August 2026	1,141	–	35	14	12	–	–	–	6	2	–	–	–	14	18
Turu-uuringute AS	6–12 August 2026	902	–	32	–	11	9	8	7	5	3	–	–	–	25	–
	28 June 2026	MEP Jüri Ratas rules out running for president														
	25 June 2026	MEP Marina Kaljurand rules out running for president														
	23 June 2026	Incumbent president Alar Karis announces not running for a second term														
Norstat	12–13 May 2026	1,005	39.1	3.3	–	10	–	2.7	2.4	2.8	–	5.1	6.7	3.5	8.2	16.2
Norstat	2 March 2026	1,001	41.6	4.2	–	–	–	2.9	5.4	2.3	–	4.7	5.5	3.6	8.3	21.5

== Endorsements ==
Party	MPs	First round
Reform Party	38	Ülle Madise
Social Democrats	14	Ülle Madise
Estonia 200	12	Ülle Madise
Isamaa	11	Ülle Madise
EKRE	9	Mart Helme(not nominated)
Centre Party	8	Tiit Land(not nominated)

== Results ==
Candidate	Votes
Candidate	First round
Ülle Madise	71
Invalid/blank votes	7
Abstentions	11
Not present	12
Electorate	101
Required supermajority	68
