= Alar Karis =

President of Estonia from 2021 to 2026

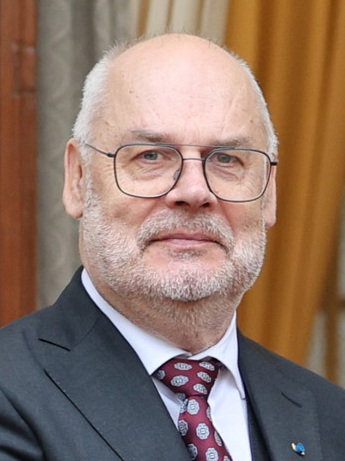
- Karis in 2026

6th President of Estonia
- In office 11 October 2021 – 12 October 2026
- Prime Minister: Kaja Kallas; Kristen Michal
- Preceded by: Kersti Kaljulaid
- Succeeded by: Ülle Madise

Auditor General of Estonia
- In office 7 April 2013 – 7 March 2018
- Preceded by: Mihkel Oviir
- Succeeded by: Janar Holm

Rector of the University of Tartu
- In office 3 July 2007 – 30 June 2012
- Preceded by: Tõnu Lehtsaar (Acting)
- Succeeded by: Volli Kalm

Rector of the Estonian University of Life Sciences
- In office 2003–2007
- Preceded by: Henn Elmet
- Succeeded by: Mait Klaassen

Personal details
- Born: 26 March 1958 (age 68) Tartu, then part of Estonian SSR, Soviet Union
- Party: Independent
- Spouse: Sirje Jädal (m. 1977)
- Children: 3
- Education: Estonian University of Life Sciences

Alar Karis (Estonian pronunciation: [ˈɑlɑr ˈkɑris]; born 26 March 1958) is an Estonian scientist (molecular geneticist and developmental biologist), civil servant and politician who served as the sixth president of Estonia from 11 October 2021 to 12 October 2026.

== Prior to presidency ==
Karis was born in Tartu on 26 March 1958. He was raised there by his mother and grandmother after his parents divorced in 1960.

In 1981, he graduated from the Estonian Agricultural Academy (now renamed Estonian University of Life Sciences) in Tartu. In 1987, he received the degree of Candidate of Veterinary Sciences from the Academy of Sciences of the Byelorussian SSR in Minsk. In 1999, he became a professor at the University of Tartu.

Karis served as rector of the Estonian University of Life Sciences from 2003 to 2007, as rector of the University of Tartu from 2007 to 2012, as the Auditor General of Estonia from 2013 to 2018, and as director of the Estonian National Museum from 2018 to 2021.

== President of Estonia (2021–2026) ==
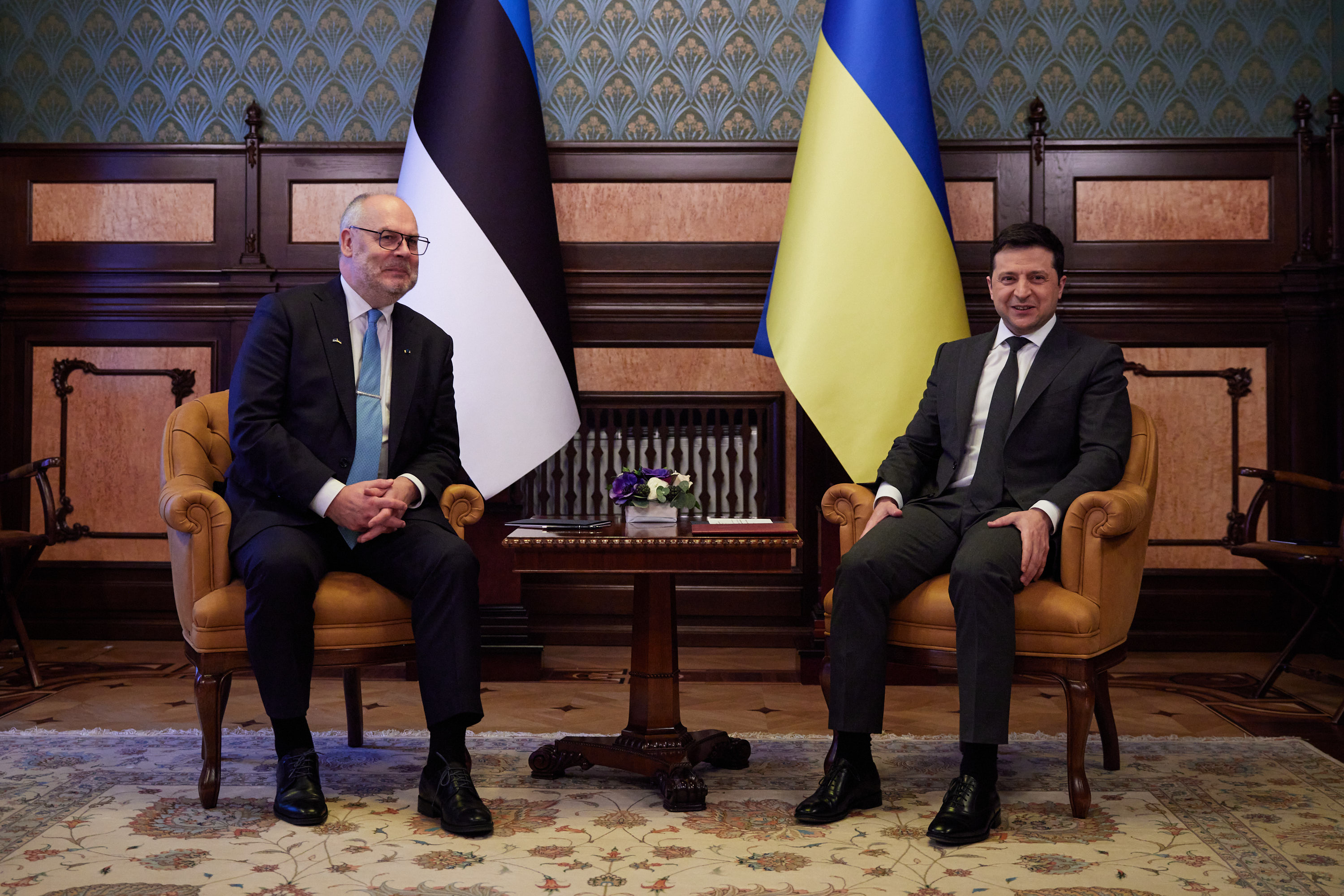
Karis meets with Ukrainian President Volodymyr Zelenskyy in Kyiv two days before the Russian invasion of Ukraine, on 22 February 2022

In August 2021, he was approached by the speaker of the parliament (Riigikogu) Jüri Ratas with a prospect of nomination for the position of the president of Estonia in the upcoming election in the autumn. He accepted the nomination and his candidacy was subsequently endorsed by both coalition parties, the Reform Party and the Centre Party. On 31 August 2021, Karis was elected as the president of Estonia with a two thirds majority of 72 votes in the Riigikogu. He assumed the office on 11 October 2021.

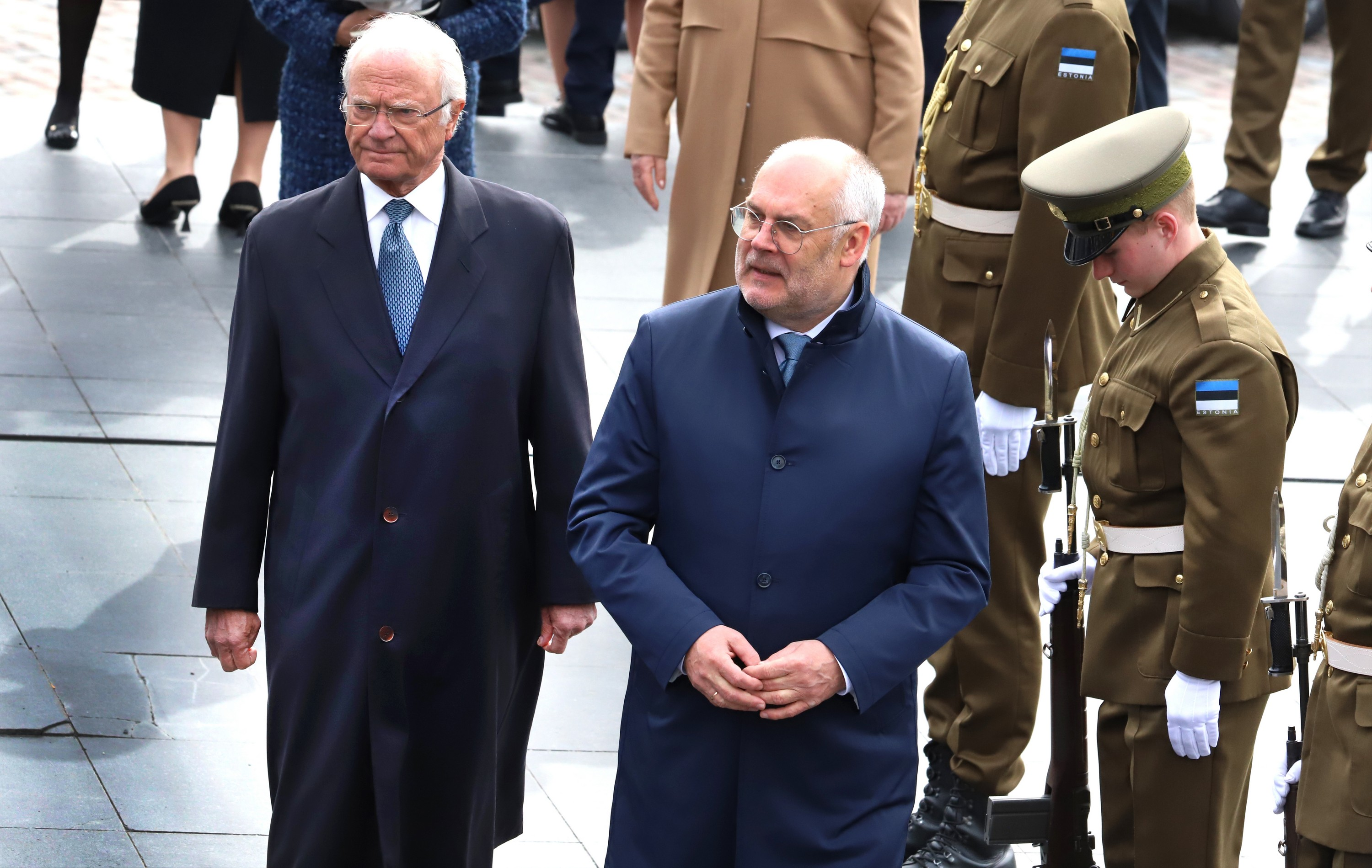
Karis with King Carl XVI Gustaf of Sweden in Tallinn, 2 May 2023

The election received criticism and calls for electoral reform due to the absence of opposing candidates. In his acceptance speech Karis referenced the "turmoil that surrounded the presidential selection process" and called for changes of the system to be examined by the Riigikogu, such as using an enlarged electoral college, facilitating the nomination of candidates or even using direct election. He promised to be a balancer and a mediator during his presidential term.

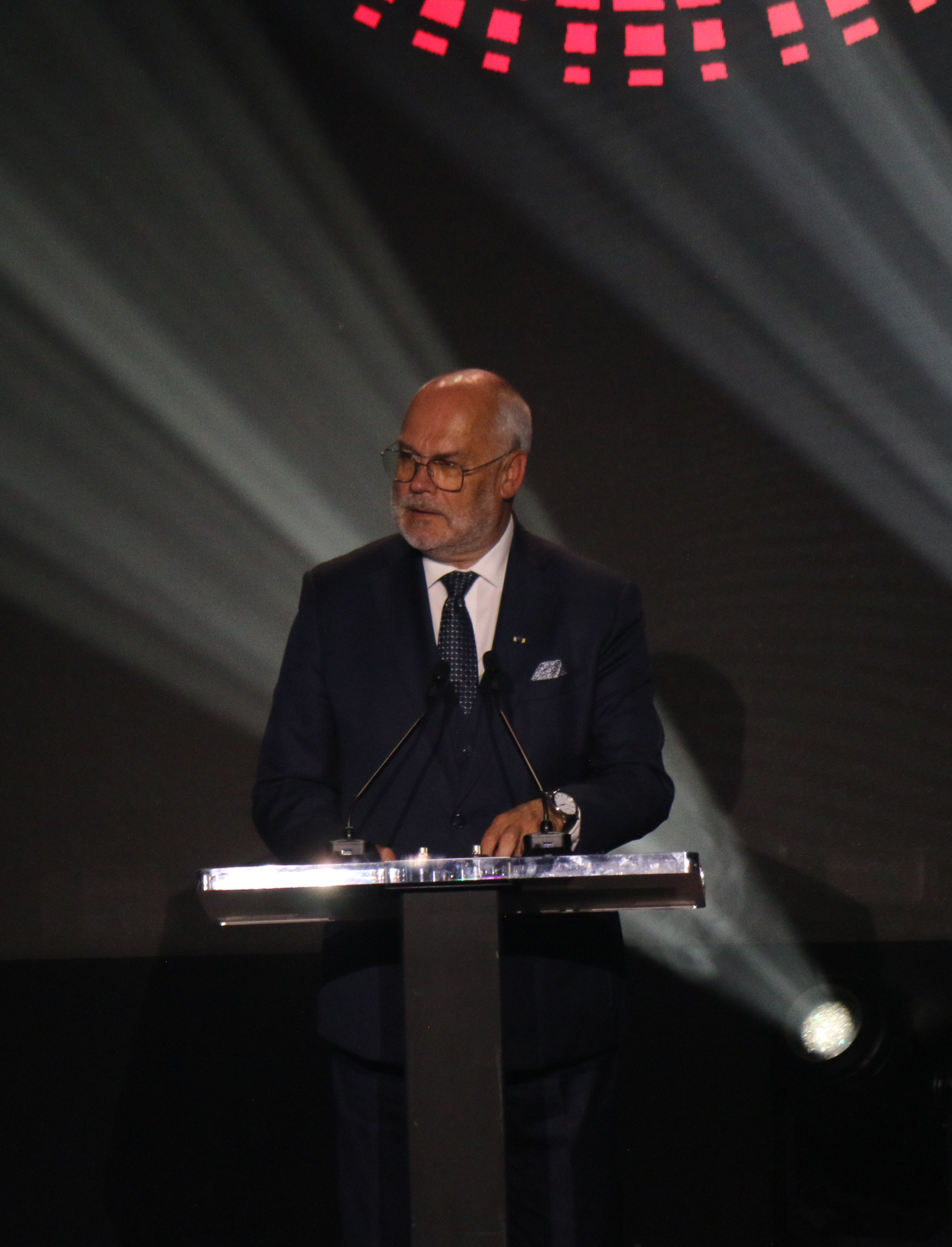
Karis at the 2025 AI for Good Summit in Geneva

Karis started his presidency with state visits to Latvia and Finland. The visit to Latvia was hosted by the speaker of the Saeima Ināra Mūrniece as President of Latvia Egils Levits had tested positive for COVID-19 the previous evening.

Karis on several occasions has used his right not to promulgate laws passed by the parliament. In December 2023 Karis refused to promulgate a law due to finding that the rules of proceedings were violated by the government by tying the bill to confidence vote. Karis found in his decision that all-out obstruction in the Riigikogu, that may render the parliament unable to work, does not give the government the right to keep tying all bills to confidence votes and therefore pushing them through the parliament. The Riigikogu however adopted the bill unchanged, Karis refused to promulgate the second time and sent the bill to the Supreme Court. Supreme Court sided with Karis.

In July 2024 Karis did not proclaim the Vehicle Tax Act finding it to be unconstitutional in violating the principle of equal treatment in the part that deals with persons with disabilities. He approved it when the law was amended by the parliament.

On 23 June 2026, Karis announced during his Estonian Victory Day address in Rapla that he would not seek a second term in the 2026 Estonian presidential election. Stating that his decision was for personal reasons, he cited a prior agreement made with his family to serve only a single term. Opposition leaders from the Centre Party and Isamaa subsequently claimed that Karis was pressured into the decision by the governing coalition despite high public approval ratings. Estonian daily Postimees pointed to his tenure as a "one-term man", citing his decisions to serve one term in previous offices as well.

He left the office of president on 12 October 2026, being succeeded by Ülle Madise.

== Personal life ==
His father was the botanist Harry Karis (1930–2018) and his mother Virve Karis (1928–2020), an agriculture specialist in animal nutrition. He grew up with his mother and grandmother Vilhelmine after his parents divorced in 1960.

He has been married to Sirje Karis (née Jädal) since 1977, with whom he has 3 children and 5 grandchildren. Besides Estonian, Karis is fluent in English and Russian. Although he is fluent in Russian, he has admitted that it needs some practice since he has not had to speak the language in a long time.

== Honours ==
=== National honours ===
- Grand Master and Collar of the Order of the National Coat of Arms (11 October 2021)
- Grand Master of the Order of the Cross of Terra Mariana
- Grand Master of the Order of the White Star
- Fourth Class of the Order of the White Star (2007)
- Grand Master of the Order of the Cross of the Eagle
- Grand Master of the Order of the Estonian Red Cross

=== Foreign honours ===
- Belgium: Commander’s Cross of the Order of Leopold II (2008)
- Czech Republic: Grand Cross with Collar of the Order of the White Lion (27 May 2026)
- Denmark: Knight of the Order of the Elephant (27 January 2026)
- Finland:
  - Grand Cross with Collar of the Order of the White Rose (27 May 2024)
  - Commander 1st Class of the Order of the Lion of Finland (2013)
- Italy: Knight Grand Cross with Collar of the Order of Merit of the Italian Republic (1 April 2025)
- Latvia:
  - Commander Grand Cross with Chain of the Order of the Three Stars (20 April 2023)
  - Commander of the Cross of Recognition (9 April 2019)
- Poland:
  - Order of the White Eagle (8 April 2025)
- Sweden:
  - Knight of the Royal Order of the Seraphim (2 May 2023)
  - Commander 1st Class of the Royal Order of the Polar Star (2011)
- Ukraine:
  - Order of Prince Yaroslav the Wise I degree (24 August 2024)

Civic offices
Preceded by Mihkel Oviir	Auditor General of Estonia; 2013–2018	Succeeded by Janar Holm
Political offices
Preceded by Kersti Kaljulaid	President of Estonia; 2021–2026	Succeeded by Ülle Madise
