= Oviir =

Family name

Oviir is a surname. Notable people with the surname include:

- Liisa Oviir (born 1977), Estonian lawyer and politician
- Mihkel Oviir (born 1942), Estonian lawyer
- Siiri Oviir (born 1947), Estonian politician and Member of the European Parliament
