= Stephanie Rendón =

Mexican writer living in Estonia

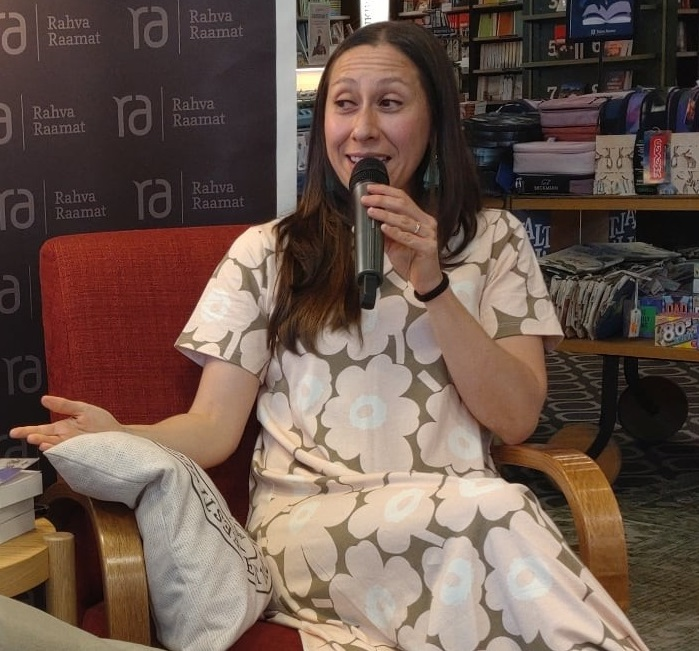
Picture of the writer: Stephanie Rendón de la Torre

Stephanie Rendón de la Torre (born 9 March 1985) is a Mexican writer, translator, editor, physicist and data scientist based in Estonia. She has written four published books, two of them translated to different languages in Mexico and in Estonia: a book of short stories (fiction) and a book of memoires. She is the editor and founder of the literary magazine, Aksolotl in Estonia and of Aksolotl Books publishing house. S. Rendón is a column writer for the literary project Artefacto de Letras, in Mexico by Bonilla Publishers. The column she contributes for is: Entre la nieve y el maíz (Between snow and corn) where literary, social and cultural topics of Estonia and Mexico are discussed.

== Early life and education ==
Rendón is the daughter of Mexican parents. She is the eldest of two younger siblings. She grew up surrounded by books, not just children's books, which she could freely access. She spent her teenage years and early adulthood attempting to write about her experiences.

She studied a bachelor's degree in Public Accounting and Finance at the Monterrey Institute of Technology and Higher Education, Mexico City campus.

In 2014, she was awarded the "Alfonso Caso" medal and graduated "Cum Laude" from her Master's studies in finance at the National Autonomous University of Mexico. She received special mention in the 2014 IMEF-Ersnt & Young Financial Research Competition. She obtained her Ph.D. in physics from the Tallinn University of Technology (Estonia) in 2019, where she has been lecturer at the undergraduate level. During her Ph.D., she received the Dora scholarship from the Archimedes Foundation and conducted research on complex networks and econophysics for the Tallinn University of Technology. She wrote a chapter for the book Modern and Interdisciplinary Problems in Network Science, by Taylor & Francis Group in 2018. She has published research articles and has also worked as an editor, translator, and international speaker on topics related to science and literature.

== Career ==
Teekond Méxicost Setomaale is her first published work in Estonian in Estonia by Hea Lugu publishing house in November 2022. In this book written as an essay, the author recounts the adventures and misfortunes experienced as a Mexican immigrant in Estonia since her arrival in the country in 2014. The work explores the adoption of the process of seeking one's own identity from an autobiographical perspective and travel chronicles.

She was a finalist in the Young Adult Novel Competition, 2022 organized by the Estonian Center for Children's Literature and Tänapäev publishing house for her novel Cinco segundos de luz. Her publication in Mexico (2023) was the book of short stories in Spanish Que venga la noche, published by the Mexican publishing house Editorial Libros de Godot. The book comprises thirteen stories that range from magical realism, science fiction, mystery, romance, classic horror, and comedy. The short story Memorias de un zorro is an ode to the Seto land in southern Estonia, for which the author feels a great love. The book has been presented in Estonia, Mexico, and Finland. Tulgu Öö is her latest publication by Gallus Editors (2023). This book includes the short story in Estonian "Que venga la noche" and the short story "Tule odüseeia" (The Odyssey of Fire).

She won second place in the 2023 essay contest organized by the Estonian National Library "Keerame uue lehe" (Let's turn a new page") with her essay: "Thoughts of a Mexican writer"

Rendón won the literary contest "Alas de lagartija" (Lizard's wings) on 2024 organized by the Culture Minister of Mexico through its program "Alas y Raíces" (Wings and Roots) with her novel La flor en su laberinto (The flower in its labyrinth). which was published in 2024.

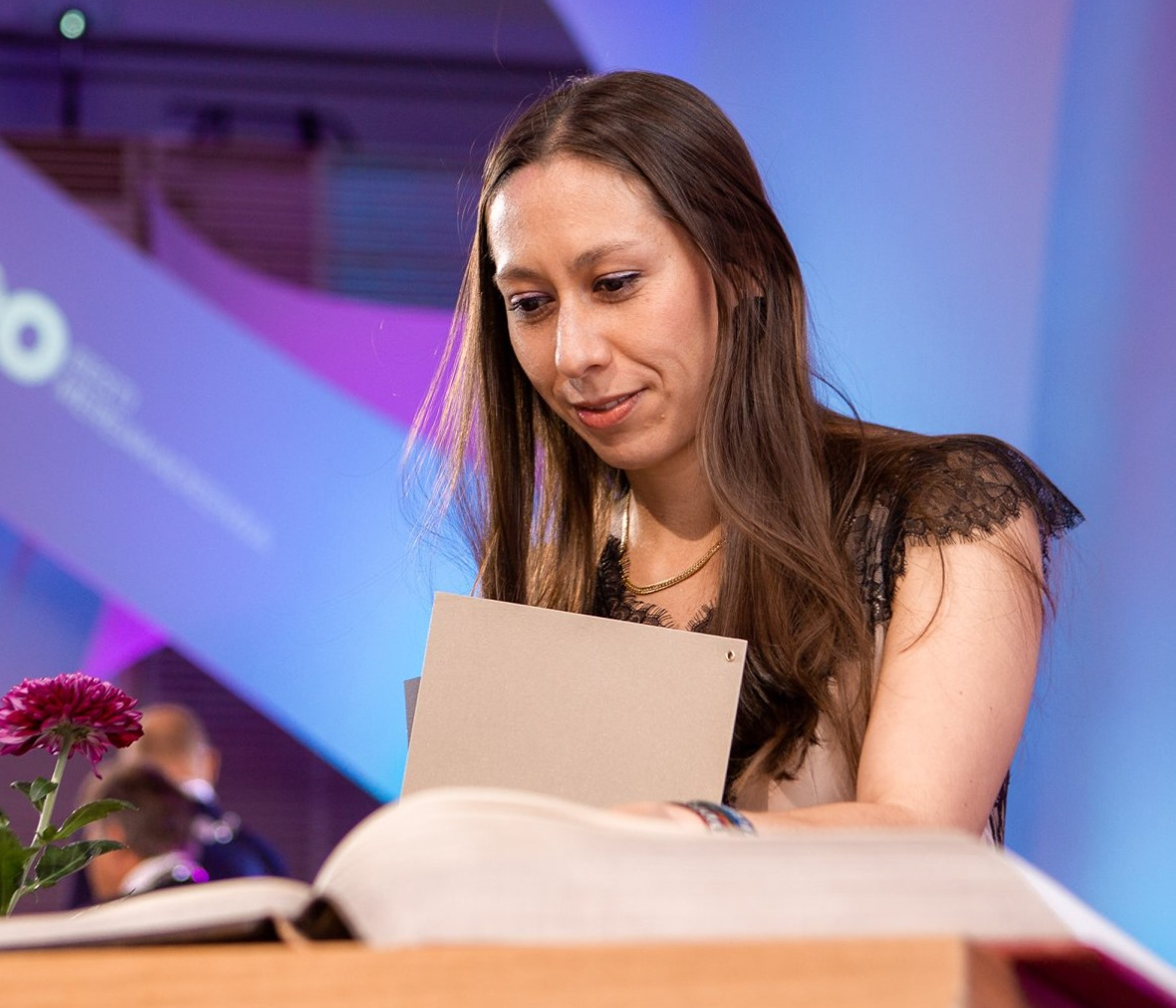

The poetry of the author has been awarded too (mention of honour) in 2024 in the 3rd Literature Contest for the Mexican Diaspora: "Voices of migrant girls and women", organized by the Foreign Institute of Mexicans.

She was selected for the 6th edition of Artists Days in Mexico City (2025) for her contributions and projects to Mexican culture outside Mexico, by the Office of Foreign Affairs of Mexico, through their Foreign Institute of Mexicans. (Instituto de Mexicanos y Mexicanas en el Exterior).

Her latest book Eesti muld ja Mehhiko süda (Estonian soil and Mexican heart) was published in Estonia (in Estonian language) by Hea Lugu publishers in 2025. The book is about multiple aspects of Mexico, the motherland of the author, such as: traditions, ancient legends, society, cuisine, history of Mexico since the times of the aztecs until Mexico in the 20th century, natural regions, crime, and art. It is a book for the Estonian reader, as there are many cultural and social aspects of Mexico that are compared with Estonia. The book also includes real life stories of the author's early years while living in Mexico.

== Recurrent topics in the author's work ==
The themes of belonging, appreciation of cultural roots and finding a place in the modern world as a human being with purpose are a recurring topics in the author's work.

The author reflects on her experience of living in Estonia for more than a decade, which has left a distinct impression on her compared to before she moved there. After a few years in Estonia, just before getting married, she bought a wooden cabin—a house in the forest that belongs to the Seto land, in southern Estonia, right on the border with Russia. From one of the windows in the living room, one can clearly see the black and white pole that marks the Estonian border in the midst of the green thickness of the forest. A little further ahead, the red and green pole that marks the location of the border with Russia can be seen. From that rustic little house, she has witnessed the magical passing of the seasons and has written several stories for this book. The questioning of "them" or "us", in terms of belonging to a culture, is something that is explored in depth in her first work, Teekond Méxicost Setomaale. Regarding her second work Que venga la noche, most of her stories are influenced by writers from the Latin American Boom generation and by argentinian writer, Jorge Luis Borges. The author has shown a particular interest in promoting equally Mexican and Seto cultures in Estonia through her work. In the same way, she has promoted Estonian and Seto culture in Mexico, through her participation in radio shows, such as in Radio Educación in "Su casa y otros viajes" (Your house and other trips) broadcast book fairs and literary/cultural events in Mexico, and also promotes Mexican culture in Estonia, through her participation in Estonian Radio programs such as in KUKU Raadio, in "Neeme Raud Siin" on different occasions of FM 89.9 to talk about Día de Muertos tradition, different cultural aspects of Mexico and her books in Estonia.

..."Pandora Centauri" and "Let the night come" are a sort of tribute to Bradbury, Asimov, and Clarke, whom I am a fervent admirer of. The story "Beware of the devil" is a classic horror story based on very mysterious events that I once heard a prominent Catholic priest tell. "Burn After Reading" is, for me, the saddest of all my stories, even though it doesn't feel that way when you read it. This story is based on real events that happened in my own family. "Fredi Heart of Glass" is also a sad story, it is the echo of a boy I met a long time ago, with the same problem as Fredi. "The Labyrinth of Anatfod" is perhaps the most Borgesian of all my stories. "Damiana and Toribio" is a love story that revolves around the queen of my life: literature. "Moussaka and Salmon" is based on the romantic history of a dear friend. "My name is not Javier" is dedicated to my father and my husband. "The map was upside down" is a kind of phantasmagoric comedy with an unexpected ending. "Quid pro quo" is a story based on a crocodile that was in my family, although the animal is not the main character of this story. When I was a child, I heard my mother mention the crocodile and I imagined the rest of the story. In all my stories, there is some autobiographical element and some more fiction. However, the line that separates both elements is sometimes blurry or even non-existent..

— Stephanie Rendón,

...The more time I spent here, the more I found myself feeling enthralled with a nation that bespoke a rich heritage and natural treasures. In fact, figuratively speaking, I prefer to associate Estonia with the appeal of an undiscovered uncut diamond, which has not been explored by many and the pleasures and contours of which have been experienced by a few. To me, the extraordinary allure of this land is based upon the very fact of it being small and relatively unknown, lending an air of limited accessibility...

...I still pine for my homeland but persist in trying my luck and putting down roots here. This paradoxical ambivalence is as robust in me as a sturdy oak tree. I am not exclusive to either my homeland or my adopted nation but am a heady echo of both. It is antagonistic while also reverberating an intoxicating harmony that I wield with a smile as I bask in the ride life has signed me up for... ...Yet belonging is not just a concept that can be understood through ownership. Rather, it is a strong and inevitable feeling that exists in human nature. A sense of belonging, or belongingness, is a human emotional need. It means to be accepted into a group and to put in place safety mechanisms that then promote a sense of care, security, and action. People tend to have an inherent desire to belong and be a significant part of something greater than themselves...

— Stephanie Rendón,

== Bibliography ==
- 2022: Teekond Méxicost Setomaale (The Journey From Mexico to Setomaa) travel writing: The journey of the author after she left Mexico in 2014 through her cultural and social discoveries in Estonia.
- 2023: Que venga la noche (Let the night come) Fantasy/fiction: Thirteen short stories, some related with love, others with sci-fi themes, mystery, murder, Estonia and Mexico.
- 2023: Tulgu Öö (publication in Estonian of the work published originally in Spanish in 2023 of "Let the night come")
- 2024: La flor en su laberinto (The flower in its labyrinth) Fiction/fantasy: A story of a woman who encounters a mysterious manuscript that defies the laws of physics and time.
- 2025: The Journey From Mexico to Setomaa (publication in English of the work published originally in Estonian in 2022)
- 2025: Eesti muld ja Mehhiko süda (Estonian soil and Mexican heart). Travel writing/culture: A book about Mexico (culture, history, society, food, life) for the Estonian public.

== Collaborations for Estonian TV and Radio ==
- Interview in the cultural program "OP" about the author and similitudes between Mexico and Setomaa
- Reportage/story from Xochimilco (Mexico City) for "Ringvaade" TV show on Mexican tradition of Niñopa.
- Reportage/story on the author and her life in Setomaa and topics related with Mexico for "Ringvaade" show.
- Reportage/story about an Estonian woman living in Puerto Vallarta, Mexico (the author as reporter and interviewer
- Episode of the TV series in Kanal Kaks "Multifacetic Estonia" where the author presents the Mexican tradition of Día de Muertos.
- Interview on the literary works of the author in Estonia by Reet Linna, for the TV show "Prillitoos".
