= Albrecht Altma =

Estonian physicist (1897–1969)

Albrecht Altma (23 March 1897 Palmse Parish – 8 May 1969 Tallinn) was an Estonian physicist.

In 1927, he graduated from University of Tartu in physics. In 1938, he defended his doctoral thesis at the Ludwig-Maximilians-Universität München (LMU).

1944–1948, he was the rector of Tallinn Polytechnical Institute.
