= Ülle Madise =

President of Estonia since 2026

- Madise in 2026

7th President of Estonia
- Incumbent
- Assumed office 12 October 2026
- Prime Minister: Kristen Michal
- Preceded by: Alar Karis

Chancellor of Justice
- In office 31 March 2015 – 12 October 2026
- President: Toomas Hendrik Ilves; Kersti Kaljulaid; Alar Karis
- Prime Minister: Taavi Rõivas; Jüri Ratas; Kaja Kallas; Kristen Michal
- Preceded by: Indrek Teder
- Succeeded by: Olari Koppel (interim)

Personal details
- Born: Ülle Anton; 11 December 1974 (age 51) Tartu, then part of Estonian SSR, Soviet Union
- Party: Independent
- Spouse: Lauri Madise
- Parent: Tõnu Anton (father)
- Education: University of Tartu (LLB; LLM)

Ülle Madise (née Anton; born 11 December 1974) is an Estonian legal scholar and politician who is the seventh president of Estonia, since 12 October 2026. She previously served as Chancellor of Justice from 2015 to 2026, having left the position upon assuming the presidency.

== Education ==
In 1993, Madise graduated from the Descartes High School in Tartu. In 1998, she received an undergraduate degree (cum laude) from the Faculty of Law of the University of Tartu. In 2001, she defended her master’s thesis titled “The Guarantee of Local Municipal Governments in the 1992 Constitution of the Republic of Estonia” at the University of Tartu.

From 2001 to 2006, she was a doctoral student at the University of Tartu. In 2007, she defended her doctoral dissertation “Elections, Political Parties, and Legislative Performance in Estonia: Institutional Choices from the Return to Independence to the Rise of E-democracy” at the Institute of Public Administration of the Tallinn University of Technology, and was awarded a PhD degree in public administration.

== Biography ==
Her father is Tõnu Anton, a former member of the Supreme Court of Estonia. Madise is also a professor of constitutional law at the University of Tartu.

In December 2021 Madise was reappointed by the parliament (Riigikogu) for a second term as Chancellor of Justice. In Estonia, the justice chancellor is not a political appointment, it is appointed by the parliament for a seven-year term. The chancellor is "to act as independent supervisor of the basic principles of the Constitution of Estonia and the protector of individual human and social rights, human dignity and equality, and the rule of law".

From 2010 she served five years on the Board of Governors of the Estonian Academy of Arts. She was a member of the European Commission against Racism and Intolerance, served on the Estonian Council of the Ethics of Public Officials, the European Region of International Ombudsman Institute (IOI) and the IOI World Board.

As chancellor of justice, Madise has commented on plans for surveillance cameras, the publishing of details from surveillance phone calls of people not accused of a crime, intervened in the issuing of digital identification cards, and called the Estonian car tax law illegal.

Madise was the host of two regular radio science shows on Estonian radio station Radio Kuku between 2009 and 2018, and spends her leisure time watching nature documentaries.

On 2 September 2026, the Riigikogu elected her to succeed Alar Karis as president of Estonia. She was sworn into office on 12 October 2026.

== Work ==
- 1997–1998 Specialist, Department of Public Law, Ministry of Justice
- 1998–2002 Head of the Department of Public Law, Ministry of Justice
- 2001–2005 Lecturer at the University of Tartu
- 2002 Parliamentary Adviser to the Minister for Justice
- 2002–2005 Adviser to the Constitutional Committee of the Riigikogu
- 2005–2009 Teacher at the Ragnar Nurkse Department of Innovation and Governance, Tallinn University of Technology
- 2006–2010 Member of the Estonian National Electoral Committee
- 2009–2015 Legal adviser to the President of Estonia
- 2009–2011 Professor of Public Law at the Tallinn University of Technology
- 2011–2015, professor of constitutional law at the University of Tartu, Department of Public Law, Department of State and Administrative Law
- 2015–2026, Chancellor of Justice of Estonia
- 2026–present, President of Estonia

Political offices
Preceded by Alar Karis	President of Estonia; 2026–present	Incumbent
