= Tiit Land =

Estonian biochemist

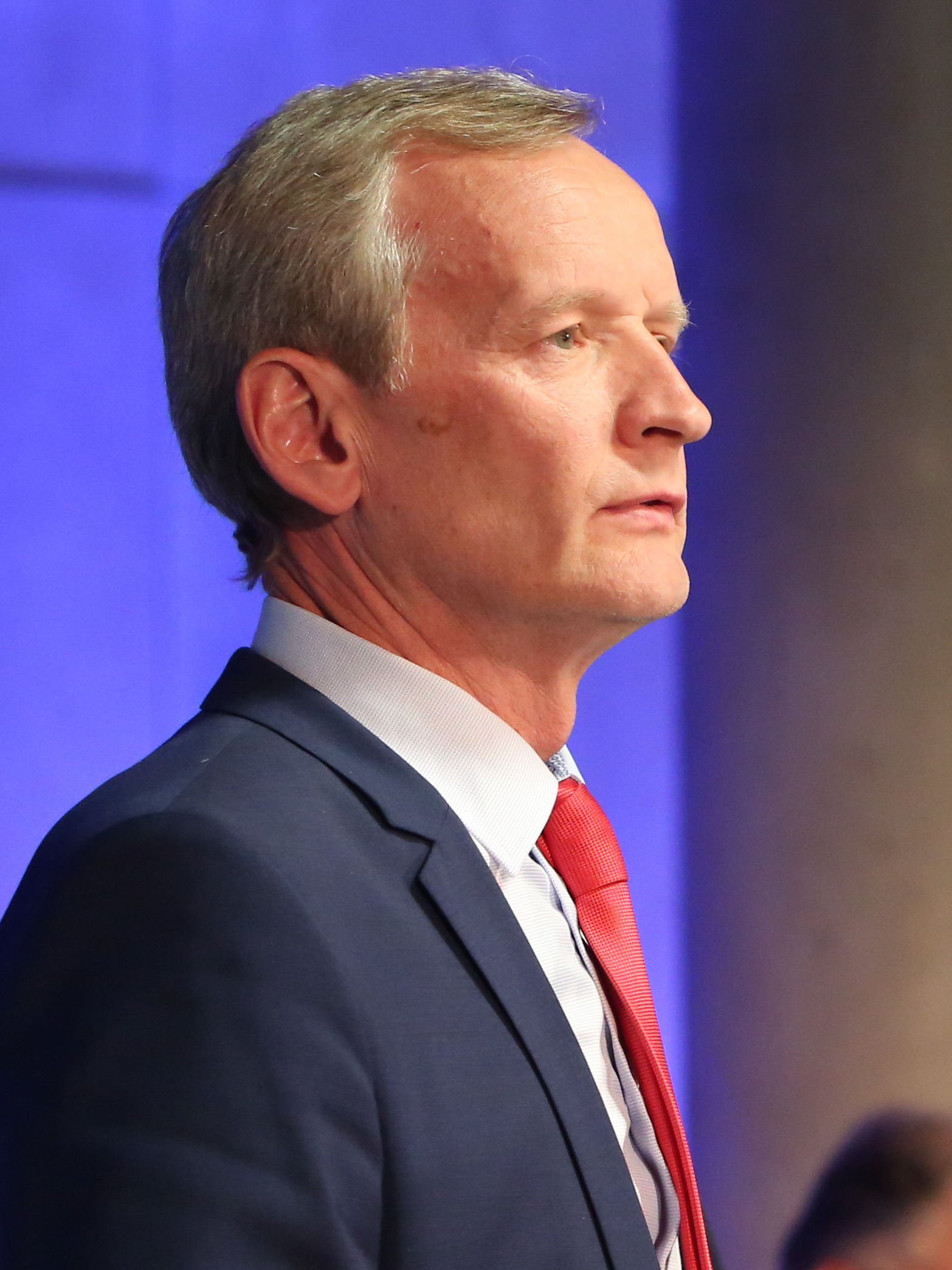
- Land in 2017

Rector of the Tallinn University of Technology
- Incumbent
- Assumed office 1 September 2020
- Preceded by: Jaak Aaviksoo

Rector of Tallinn University
- In office 14 February 2011 – 31 August 2020
- Preceded by: Rein Raud
- Succeeded by: Priit Reiska (acting); Tõnu Viik

Personal details
- Born: 25 September 1964 (age 61) Tartu, Estonia
- Party: Independent
- Spouse: Kadri Land
- Children: 2
- Education: University of Tartu; Stockholm University (PhD)

Tiit Land (born 25 September 1964) is an Estonian biochemist. Since 1 September 2020, he is the rector of Tallinn University of Technology.

From 1994 until 1999, Land worked as a researcher at the National Institutes of Health in the United States. From 1999 until 2006, he was a researcher and lecturer at the Stockholm University's Neurochemistry Neurotoxicology Institute. From 2007 until 2011 he worked as a professor and chair of chemistry at Tallinn University's Department of Natural Sciences, Institute of Mathematics, and Natural Sciences.

On 14 February 2011, Land was elected rector of Tallinn University. On 8 February 2016, he was re-elected for a second term.

== Politics ==
In August 2026, the rectors of various Estonian universities signed a joint letter endorsing Land's candidacy for the presidency of Estonia in the 2026 Estonian presidential election. He expressed readiness to run and said he would be a neutral president. He described himself as more of a liberal, but said it would depend on the subject and he finds himself to be conservative in some subjects.

== Personal life ==
Tiit Land was born in Tartu due to the Võru hospital's maternity ward being under reparation. He is married to Kadri Land and has two children.

In 1989, he graduated cum laude in chemistry and bioorganic chemistry at the University of Tartu.

He earned a PhD in neurochemistry and neurotoxicology at Stockholm University in 1994.

== Honours ==
- Third Class of the Order of the White Star (2022)
- Tallinn University Badge of Merit (2021)
- Order of Merit of Tallinn (2014)
