= Nordecon =

Company based in Estonia

Nordecon (earlier names Eesti Ehitus and Nordecon International) is an Estonian construction company.

The company's biggest stakeholder and chairman of company's council is Toomas Luman. Since May 2006, the company is listed in Nasdaq Tallinn.

The company is established in 1989 under the name Eesti Ehitus.

Notable projects are as follows: AHHAA Centre, Lõunakeskus shopping centre, Tigutorn building.

In 2021, Nordecon was the 19th largest company on the Nasdaq Baltic Exchange in terms of trading activity.
