= 2016 Estonian presidential election =

- 29 August – 3 October 2016
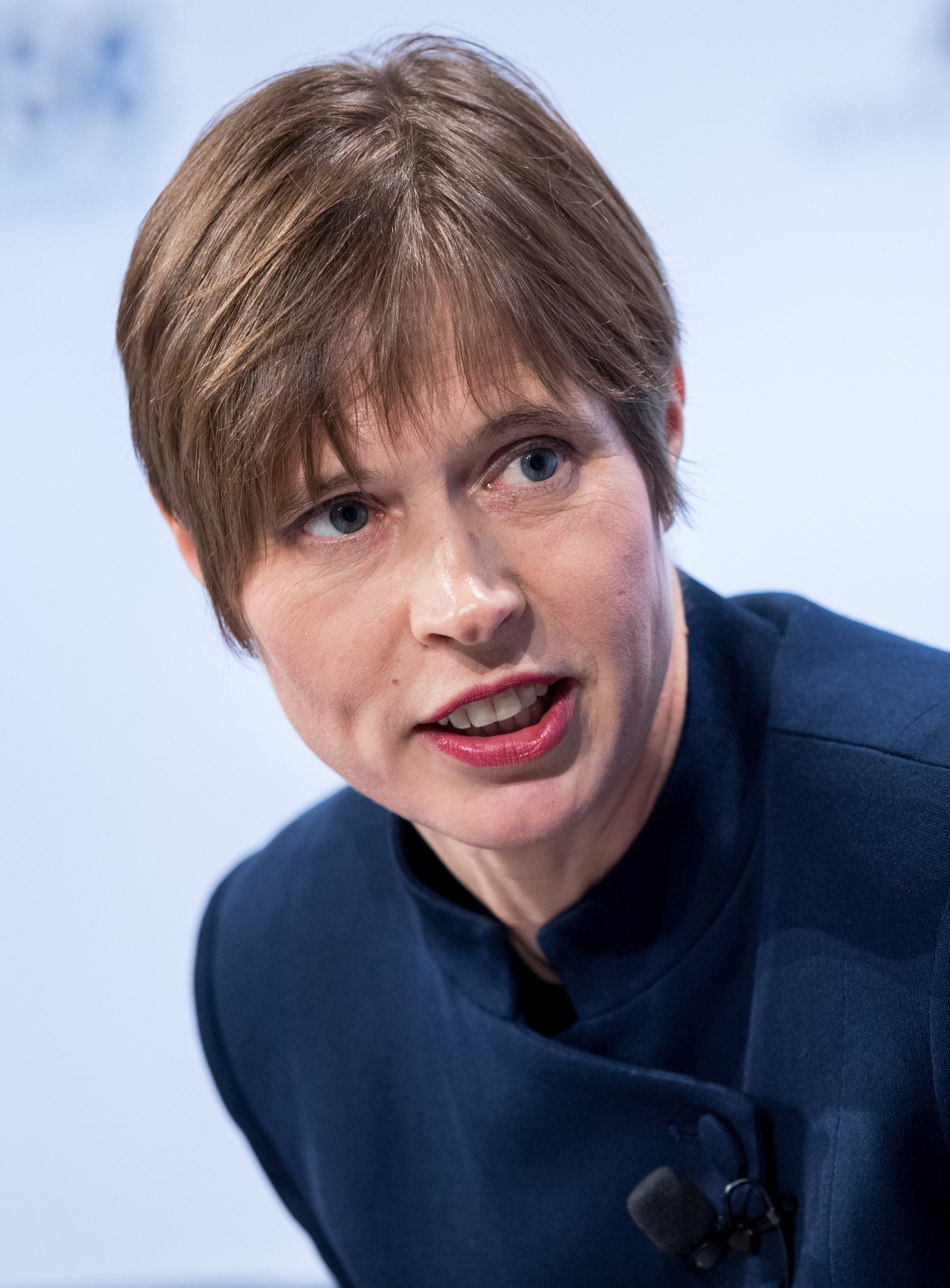

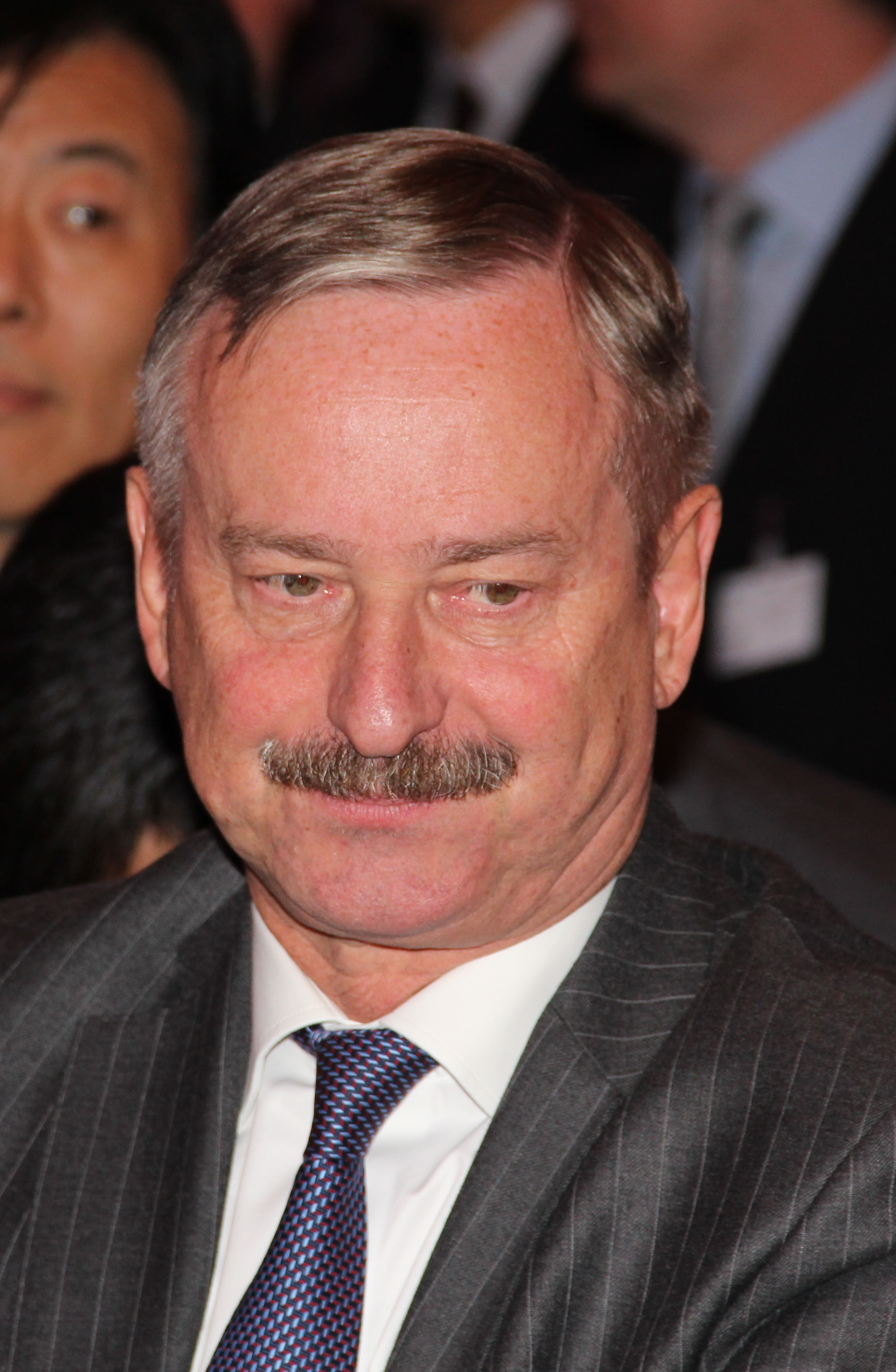

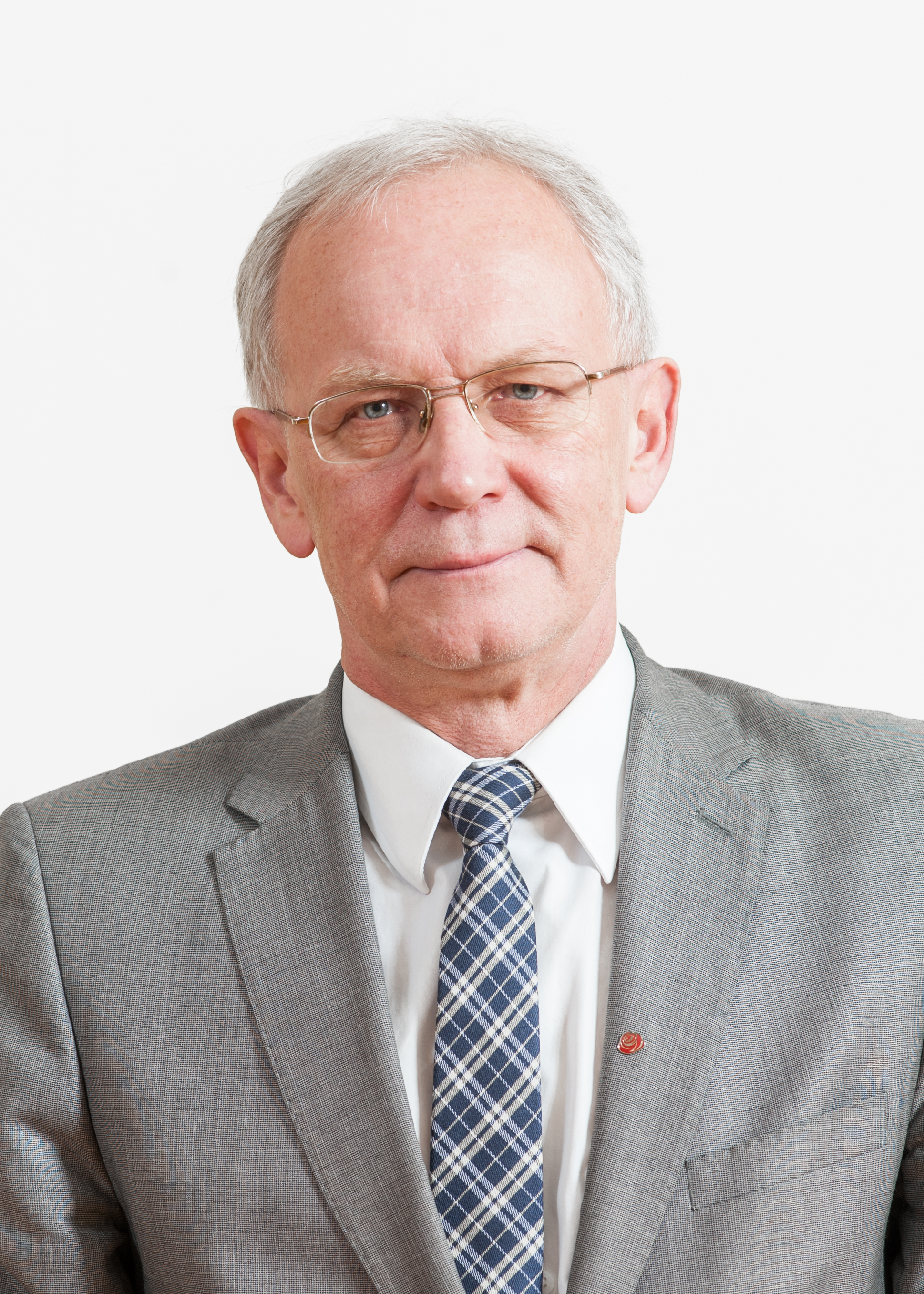

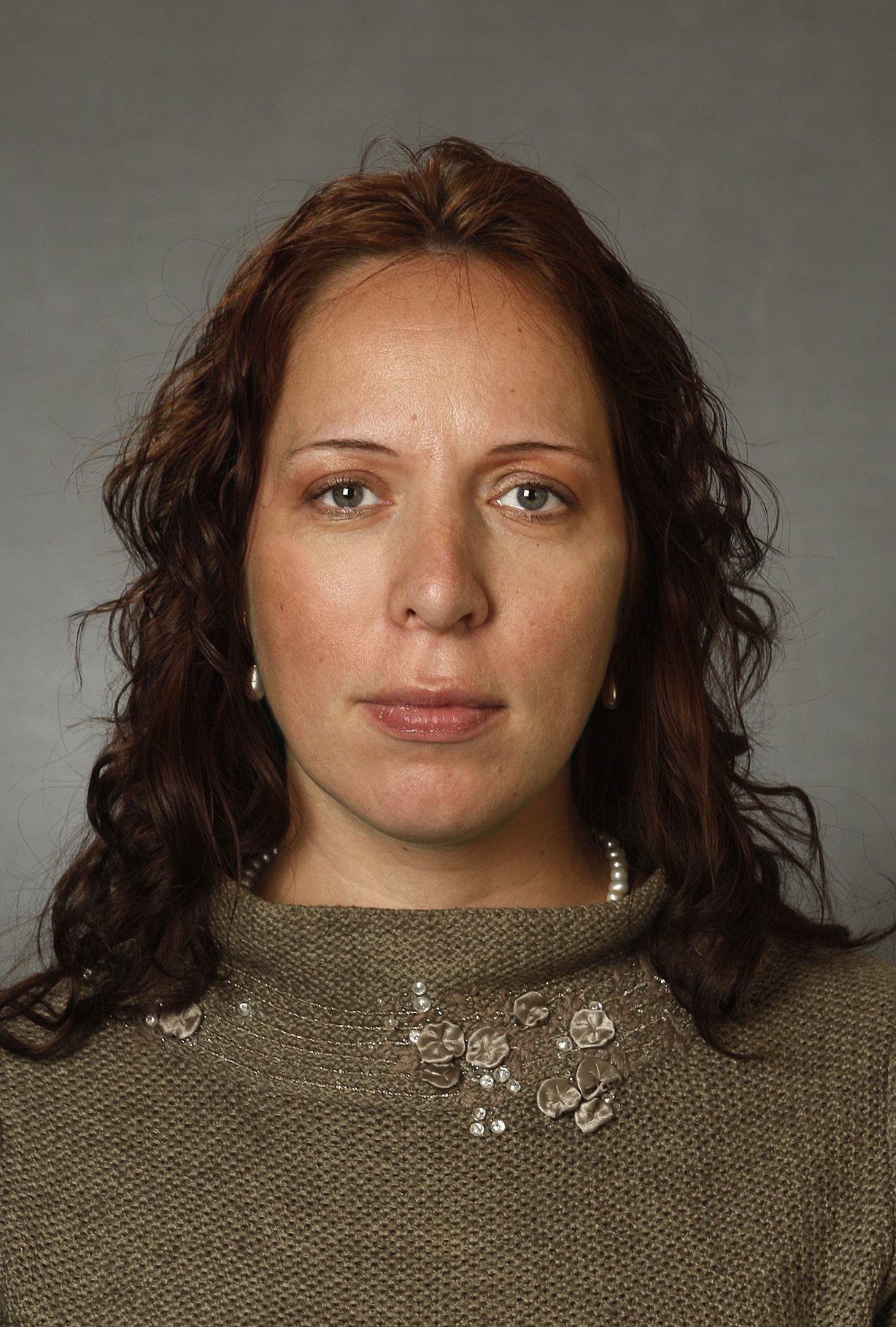

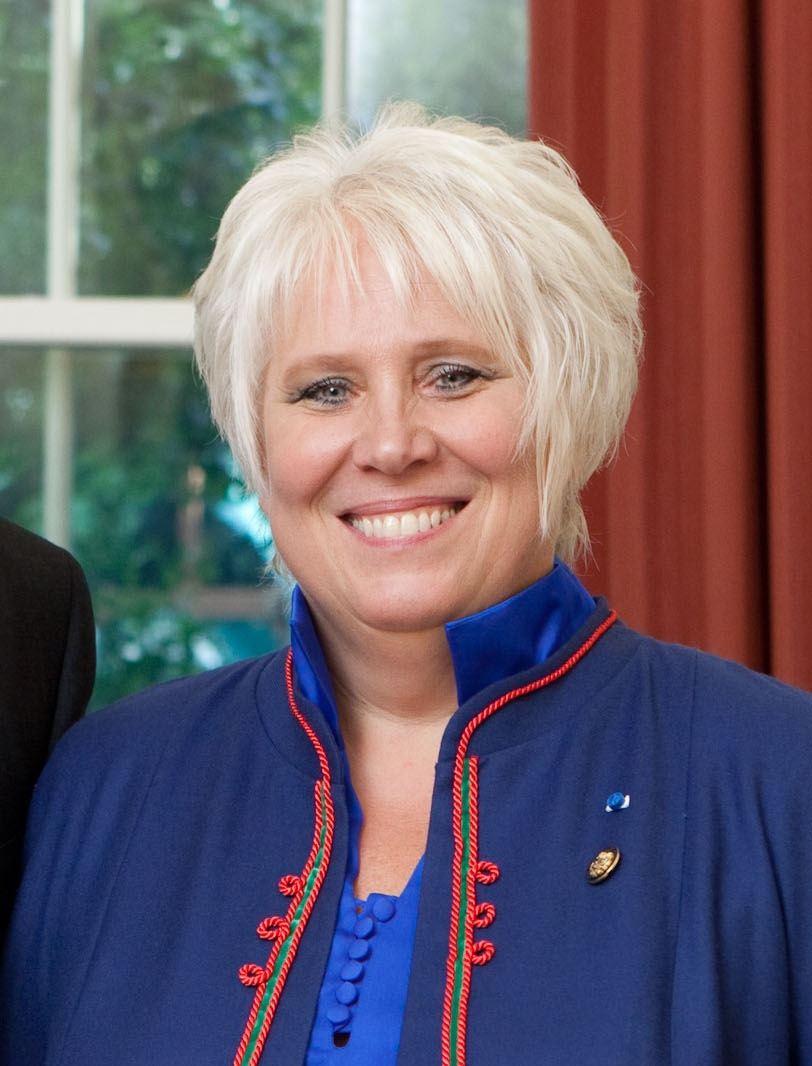
Nominee	Kersti Kaljulaid	Siim Kallas	Allar Jõks
Party	Independent	Reform	Independent
First round	0	0	25
Second round	0	45	21
Third round	0	42	0
First electoral round	0	81	83
Second electoral round	0	138	134
Final round	81	0	0
Nominee	Eiki Nestor	Mailis Reps	Marina Kaljurand
Party	Social Democratic	Centre	Independent
First round	40	26	0
Second round	0	32	0
Third round	0	26	0
First electoral round	0	79	75
Second electoral round	0	0	0
Final round	0	0	0
President before election
Toomas Hendrik Ilves
Social Democratic
Elected President
Kersti Kaljulaid
Independent

An indirect election took place in Estonia in 2016 to elect the president of Estonia, who is the country's head of state. The Riigikogu — the Parliament of Estonia — elected Kersti Kaljulaid to be the next head of state of Estonia to succeed Toomas Hendrik Ilves, who had served his second and final term as president (as he was term-limited). Kaljulaid is the first female head of state of Estonia.

Somewhat unusually, Kaljulaid was elected president only after other candidates could not be elected in three rounds of parliamentary voting and two rounds of voting by an electoral college consisting of members of Parliament and representatives of local governments of Estonia.

== Process ==
By law, the president of Estonia is indirectly elected. The Riigikogu (Parliament) has the task of electing the president in the first instance. If no candidate received the required supermajority of two-thirds (68 votes out of 101), the president is selected by an electoral college consisting of MPs and representatives of local (municipal) governments. Failing that, the process is to return to the parliament yet again.

The first three rounds of the election took place in the Riigikogu on 29 August 2016 (first round) and 30 August 2016 (second and third rounds). Since no candidate received the required supermajority in three balloting rounds, an electoral college convened on 24 September consisting of members of Riigikogu and representatives of Estonia's local governments. The electoral college voted twice, but no candidate managed to reach an absolute majority of 168 votes. Thus, the next round of the election returned to Riigikogu on 3 October. The parliament elected Kersti Kaljulaid, then the country's representative to the European Court of Auditors, as the next President of Estonia.

The incumbent, President Toomas Hendrik Ilves, having served the maximum two terms, was not eligible to run for re-election.

== In the Parliament ==
=== Candidates ===
Candidates
Allar Jõks; IRL and Estonian Free Party; Former Chancellor of Justice	Siim Kallas; Reform Party; Former Prime Minister and European Commissioner	Eiki Nestor; Social Democratic Party, Reform Party; Speaker of the Riigikogu	Mailis Reps; Centre Party; Member of Parliament, former Minister of Education

Candidates could be nominated by one-fifth of the members of Riigikogu (21 MPs).

On 30 May 2016, Social Democratic Party endorsed Eiki Nestor as the party's candidate, but lacked MPs to officially support the bid. Same day the Pro Patria and Res Publica Union's Parliamentary Group endorsed Allar Jõks. On 8 August, Jõks was also endorsed by the Estonian Free Party, after which he had enough backing for official candidacy.

On 11 June 2016, with 53% of the votes the Centre Party elected Mailis Reps as their presidential candidate, in preference to Edgar Savisaar.

On 12 June 2016, the Conservative People's Party of Estonia decided to nominate Mart Helme for president. As none of the other parties supported Helme's candidacy, he was left out of the election. Ambassador and former Minister of Defence Jaak Jõerüüt also prepared to run for president, but did not gain support from any party.

On 3 August 2016, the Reform Party nominated Siim Kallas as the party's official candidate. Marina Kaljurand and Urmas Paet had also announced interest in running, although Kaljurand stated that she was interested in doing so only if the electoral college was convened. On 23 August, Reform Party and Social Democratic Party made a pact to support Nestor's nomination and to vote for him in the first round of voting and, if this is unsuccessful, to support Kallas in the second and third rounds.

=== Election results at the parliament ===
Candidate	First round		Second round		Third round	
Candidate	Votes	%	Votes	%	Votes	%
Allar Jõks	25	24.75	21	20.79	–	–
Siim Kallas	–	–	45	44.55	42	41.58
Eiki Nestor	40	39.60	–	–	–	–
Mailis Reps	26	25.74	32	31.68	26	25.74
Invalid/blank votes	8	7.92	1	0.99	30	29.70
Abstentions	2	1.98	2	1.98	3	2.97
Total	101	100	101	100	101	100
Source: Vabariigi Valimiskomisjon

== In the Electoral College ==
=== Candidates ===
Candidates
Mart Helme; Chairman of EKRE	Allar Jõks; Former Chancellor of Justice	Marina Kaljurand; Former Minister of Foreign Affairs	Siim Kallas; Former Prime Minister and European Commissioner	Mailis Reps; Member of Parliament, former Minister of Education

After the members of Riigikogu failed to elect the president, the electoral college was called to convene and the nomination procedure started over. Each candidate needed 21 members of the electoral college to nominate them. As Kallas and Reps were in the last voting round in the Riigikogu, they automatically qualified as candidates.

On 30 August 2016, the Reform Party decided to support Siim Kallas in the electoral college, whilst Marina Kaljurand was also interested in running. After the decision, Kaljurand announced that she would step down from her position as Minister of Foreign Affairs and would run for presidency without the support from the Reform Party. Her presidential bid was then supported by the Social Democratic Party.

Both the Free Party and Pro Patria and Res Publica Union decided to keep backing Allar Jõks in the electoral college and gathered enough signatures for nomination.

On 20 September, the chairman of Conservative People's Party of Estonia Mart Helme announced that he had gathered enough signatures for nomination.

=== Results at the electoral college ===
Candidate	Fourth round		Fifth round	
Candidate	Votes	%	Votes	%
Mart Helme	16	4.78	–	–
Allar Jõks	83	24.78	134	40.00
Marina Kaljurand	75	22.39	–	–
Siim Kallas	81	24.18	138	41.19
Mailis Reps	79	23.58	–	–
Invalid/blank votes	0	0	60	17.91
Abstentions	1	0.30	3	0.90
Total	335	100	335	100
Source: Vabariigi Valimiskomisjon

== Back to the Parliament ==
=== Candidates ===
Candidate
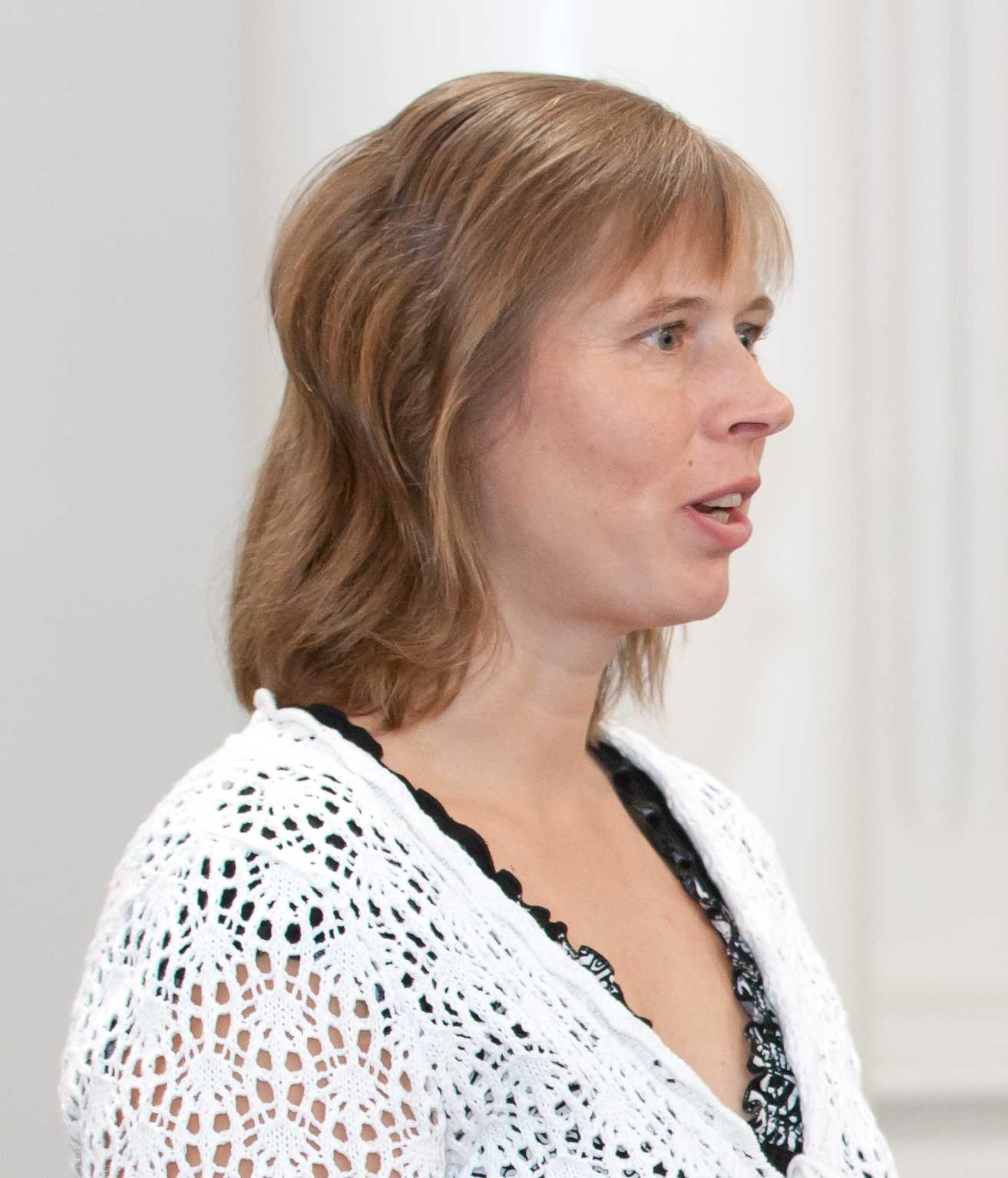
Kersti Kaljulaid
Reform Party, Centre Party, Social Democratic Party, IRL, Free Party
Estonian representative to the European Court of Auditors

After the electoral college failed to elect the president, the election returned to the Parliament and the nomination procedure started over. After the results of the electoral college were announced, Jõks stated that he would not run again. Helme also announced that he wouldn't run again and argued that all other previous candidates should do the same, as "new candidates were needed". Later, Kaljurand also announced that she wouldn't run again.

On 27 September, a "council of elders" of Riigikogu (consisting of the speaker, vice-speakers, and leaders of all party factions) met in order to find a common candidate for all parties. They decided to propose Kersti Kaljulaid, the Estonian auditor in the European Court of Auditors. The proposal was received positively by the parliamentary parties, most of the MPs supporting Kaljulaid's election. On 30 September 2016, Kaljulaid was officially nominated by 90 MPs. As there were not enough uncommitted MPs left to nominate another candidate, Kaljulaid was the sole candidate in the election.

=== Results ===
Candidate	Sixth round	
Candidate	Votes	%
Kersti Kaljulaid	81	80%
Invalid/blank votes	17	17%
Abstentions	3	3%
Total	101	100
Source: Vabariigi Valimiskomisjon

== Opinion polls ==
Even though the president was not elected by popular vote, there were numerous public opinion polls studying candidates' popularity.

Poll source	Survey dates	Sample size											
Poll source	Survey dates	Sample size	Kaljurand Ind.	Savisaar Kesk	Tarand Ind.	Kallas Ref	Rüütel EKRE	Ergma IRL	Paet Ref	Helme EKRE	Jõks Ind.	Nestor SDE	Reps Kesk
TNS Emor	Sep 2016	1009	40%	–	–	18%	–	–	–	6%	5%	7%	8%
Turu-uuringute AS	Aug 2016	1003	22%	15%	6%	17%	–	–	2%	5%	8%	3%	3%
TNS Emor	Aug 2016	1505	30.4%	–	–	22.3%	–	–	–	6%	6.9%	4.9%	7.8%
Turu-uuringute AS	Jun 2016	–	29%	14%	6%	9%	–	–	2%	4%	8%	2%	1%
TNS Emor	Jun 2016	1375	25%	14%	6%	11%	–	–	4%	5%	11%	2%	2%
TNS Emor	Apr 2016	1293	30%	14%	10%	12%	–	–	–	5%	3%	2%	–
Turu-uuringute AS	Jan 2016	1001	23%	14%	9%	8%	5%	4%	3%	–	–	3%	–
TNS Emor	Dec 2015	–	20.3%	12.6%	9.5%	10.6%	3.2%	4%	2.9%	–	–	1.4%	–
TNS Emor	Aug 2015	1203	14.3%	13.2%	10.1%	11.2%	3.4%	5.4%	4.8%	–	–	2.3%	–
TNS Emor	Mar 2015	1251	10.4%	13%	9.6%	13%	3.6%	6.7%	–	–	–	1.3%	–
