= Richard Övel =

Estonian politician

Richard Övel (21 November 1894 – 11 January 1957) was the Chancellor of Justice of Estonia from 1944 to 1949. He was appointed the position of Chancellor of Justice in September 1944 when Prime Minister Jüri Uluots appointed a new government headed by Otto Tief.
