= Indrek Teder =

Estonian lawyer and jurist

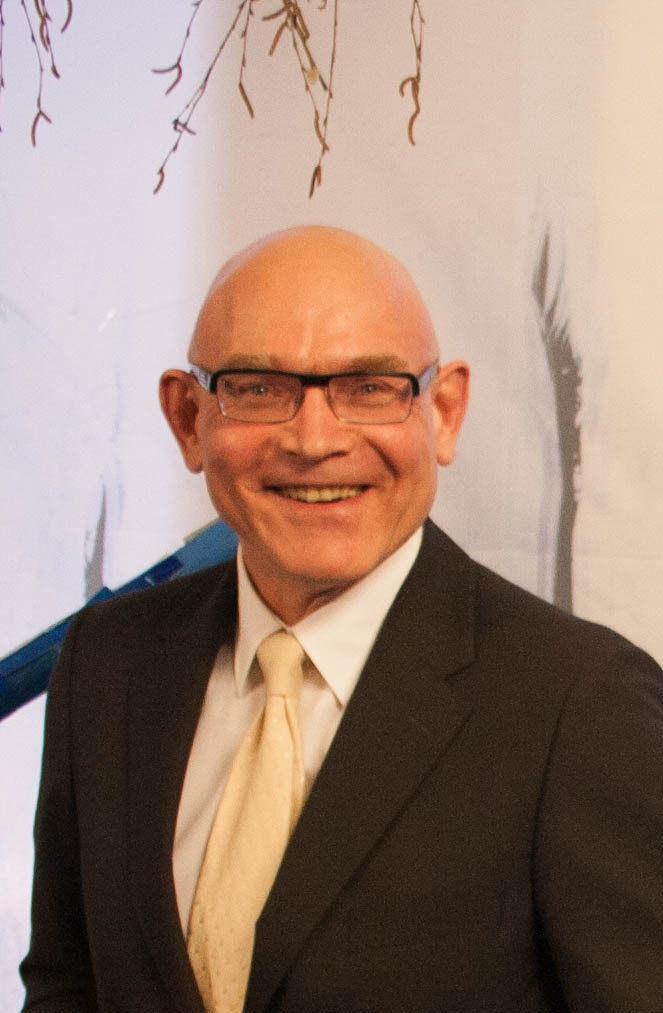
Indrek Teder at the 2012 Presidential reception.

Indrek Teder (born 3 December 1957, Tallinn, Soviet Union) is an Estonian lawyer and jurist.

From 2008 to 2015 he was the Chancellor of Justice of Estonia.

== Biography ==
He graduated from the University of Tartu, Faculty of Law in 1983, and joined the Estonian Bar Association in the same year.

He was a member of the Congress of Estonia.

He belongs to the Estonian Students' Society.

== Decorations ==
- 2001: 4th Class of the Order of the White Star (received 23 February 2001)
- 2015: 3rd Class of the Order of the National Coat of Arms (received 23 February 2015)

Political offices
Preceded by Allar Jõks	Chancellor of Justice; 2008–2015	Succeeded by Ülle Madise
