= Allar Jõks =

Estonian lawyer

Chancellor of Justice
- In office 20 February 2001 – 7 March 2008
- Preceded by: Eerik-Juhan Truuväli
- Succeeded by: Indrek Teder

Personal details
- Born: 18 March 1965 (age 61) Tartu, then part of Estonian SSR, Soviet Union
- Education: University of Tartu

Allar Jõks (born 18 March 1965) is an Estonian lawyer and the former Chancellor of Justice. He was proposed to the office by President Lennart Meri and served between 2001 and 2008. He was proposed again by Toomas Hendrik Ilves in December 2007, but the Riigikogu voted against the appointment.

== Biography ==
Before the 2016 presidential election, 14 public figures, including Jüri Käo, Mihhail Lotman and Peeter Volkonski, signed a letter in support of Jõks' candidacy. Following the letter, Jõks announced his intention in running for president. Two parties, Pro Patria and Res Publica Union and the Free Party, decided to support his nomination.

In the first two rounds of the election, Jõks gained 25 and 21 votes in the Parliament, thus not advancing to the third round. However, as the Parliament failed to make a decision between Siim Kallas and Mailis Reps during the third round, the electoral college was convened for 24 September 2016. Jõks was again backed by the IRL and the Free Party for re-nomination. The electoral college gave Jõks the second most votes and thus he advanced to the fifth round of the presidential election with Kallas. In the fifth round, neither Jõks or Kallas reached an absolute majority of 168 votes, resulting another round of election in Riigikogu. After hearing the results of the fifth round, Jõks announced that he would not run again.

Political offices
Preceded by Eerik-Juhan Truuväli	Chancellor of Justice; 2001–2008	Succeeded by Indrek Teder
