= Toomas Luman =

Estonian entrepreneur (born 1959)

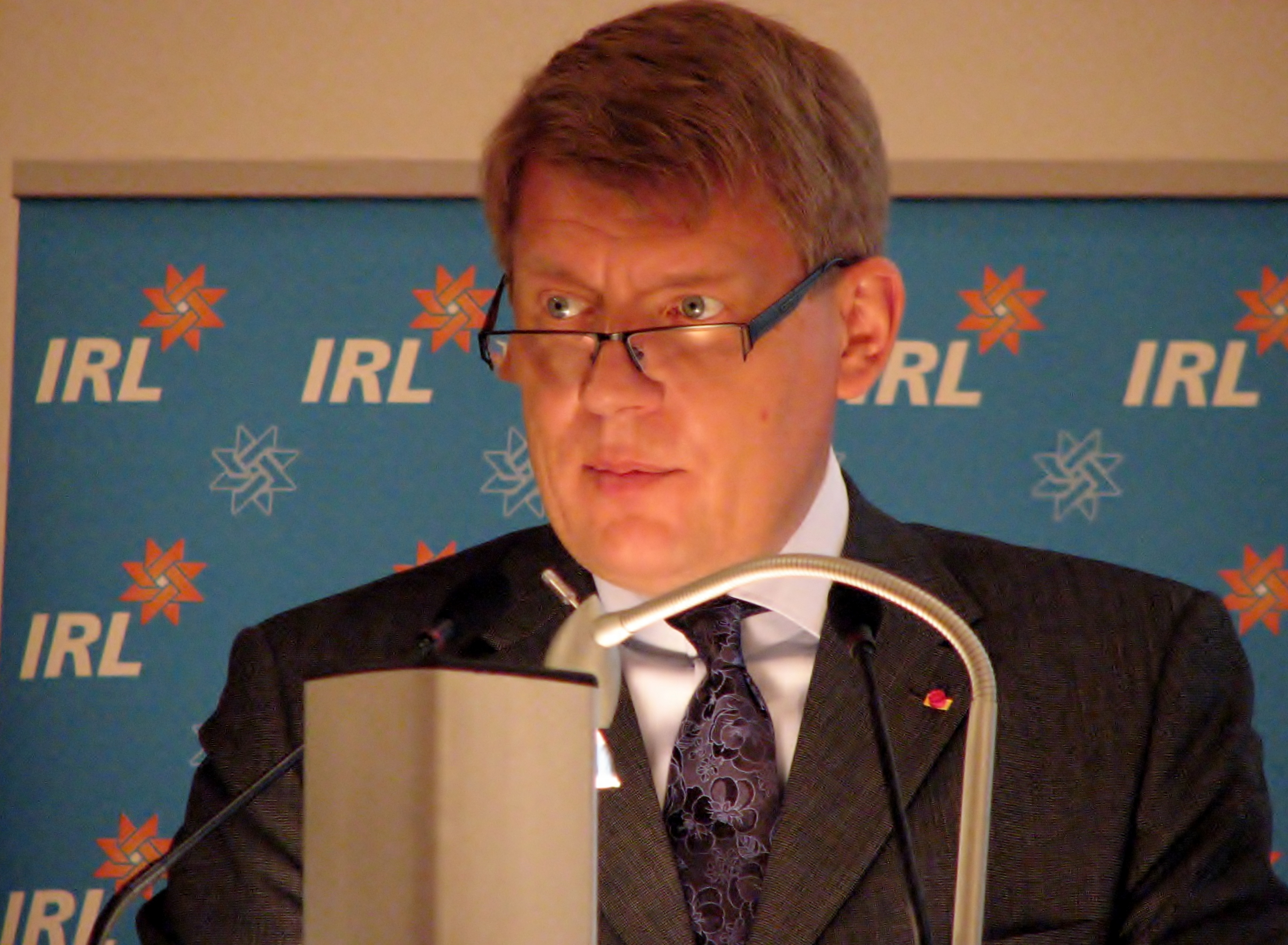
Toomas Luman

Toomas Luman (born 30 October 1959) is an Estonian entrepreneur.

He has been the chairman of Nordecon's council.

He is the chairman of the Estonian Chamber of Commerce and Industry.

In 2006, he was awarded by Order of the White Star, I class.

In August 2018, he was temporarily promoted to the rank of lieutenant colonel in order to run for the presidency of the International Association of Reserve Officers of NATO Countries (CIOR). On June 16, 2022, President Alar Karis gave him the rank of lieutenant colonel.
