= Tõnu Viik (philosopher) =

Tõnu Viik (born 12 July 1968 in Jõhvi) is an Estonian philosopher.

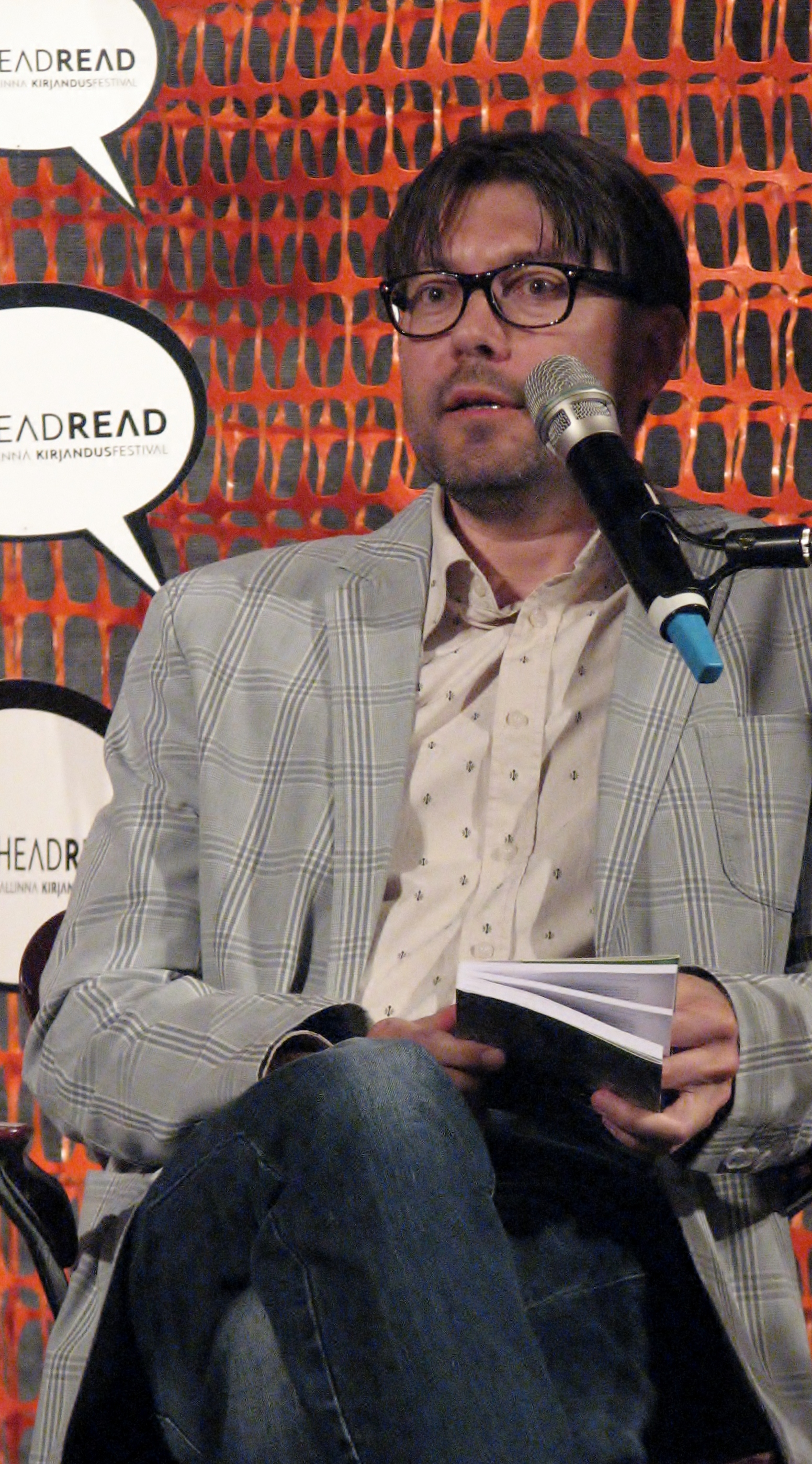
Tõnu Viik

== Career ==
- Viik has worked from 1993-2007 at the Tallinn University of Technology as a lecturer (1993-1994).
- Lecturer at the Estonian Institute of Humanities (1994-1998).
- Study assistant and lecturer at Emory University (1999-2003), also where he finished his doctoral studies.
- Professor of philosophy and a rector at the Estonian Institute of Humanities (2004-2007).
- Professor of philosophy and a director at the Tallinn University Estonian Institute of Humanities (2007-2015).
- Director at the Tallinn University Estonian Institute of Humanities and Tallinn University School of Humanities (2014-2020).
- Distinguished Professor of Philosophy (2020-present) and rector (2021-present) at Tallinn University.

== Philosophy & Research ==
His philosophical research has dealt with the following topics: philosophy of culture and cultural theory, phenomenology, culture-dependent meaning formation, collective emotions, happiness, love and self-deception.
