= Eerik-Juhan Truuväli =

Estonian lawyer and academic (1938–2019)

Eerik-Juhan Truuväli (7 March 1938 – 25 June 2019) was an Estonian lawyer and professor of legal theory at the University of Tartu.

From 1989 to 1993 he was the chairman of the Estonian National Electoral Committee.

From 1993 to 2000 he was the Chancellor of Justice of Estonia.

== Honors ==
- 2000 Order of the National Coat of Arms
- 2001 Ida-Virumaa Order (Estonian: Ida-Virumaa teenetemärk)
- 2006 Order of the White Star
