= National Audit Office of Estonia =

Government agency of Estonia

- Riigikontroll

Agency overview
- Formed: 27 December 1918
- Jurisdiction: Government of Estonia
- Headquarters: Kiriku 2/4, 15013 Tallinn
- Employees: ~100
- Annual budget: €5,945,000 (FY 2019)
- Agency executive: Janar Holm, Auditor General
- Website: www.riigikontroll.ee

The National Audit Office of Estonia (Estonian: Riigikontroll) is an independent institution in Estonia, which is responsible for exercising economic control in order to assure the parliament and the public that public assets are used legally and effectively.

== History ==
=== Formation and disbandment (1918–1940) ===
The National Audit Office of Estonia was established on 27 December 1918 with a decision by the Estonian Provincial Assembly. Aleksander Oinas became the first Auditor General on January 6, 1919. Due to the ongoing Estonian War of Independence, a military department was formed under the National Audit Office on January 26, 1919, with an agreement between the Auditor General and the Commander of the Estonian Defence Forces. More departments were formed later that year. On February 5, a law was passed, which determined the tasks of the institution. On May 8, A. Oinas became the Minister of the Interior and Aleksander Käsk became the acting Auditor General. On July 1, Karl August Einbund was appointed the Auditor General and led the organization until July 30, 1920, when he also became Minister of the Interior. Peeter Reisik took over the position until he was replaced by Ferdinand Vellner on October 11, 1920. On 22 September 1919 the Audit Board of the National Audit Office approved regulations, which stipulated the areas of focus, structure of the organization, mandate and tasks of the Auditor General, composition of the Audit Board, procedures etc. Also, during that year, the audit office was made responsible for overseeing the printing of Estonian money. This meant that the audit office had to send representatives to Finland, where the money was printed. Aleksander Oinas became the Auditor General again on March 17, 1921. On November 16, 1926, he was replaced by Johannes Friedrich Zimmermann. In 1927 a limit was introduced on the number of officials at the audit office. A new Auditor General, Karl-Johannes Soonberg (later named Karl Soonpää), was appointed in July 1929. On June 17, 1940, the Soviets occupied Estonia. Karl Soonpää was released on July 10 and on July 13 Aleksander Aben became acting Auditor General. The National Audit Office was finally disbanded on August 25, 1940.

=== Restoration and present day (1990–present) ===
On May 29, 1989, a working group was established to reorganize the control bodies of the Estonian Soviet Socialist Republic by the Council of Ministers. By the end of the year the working group had presented a new concept, which envisaged the dissolution of 31 state agencies. Some of the responsibilities of those bodies were to be taken over by a new audit office. During that same year, work began to formulate an act for national auditing. In May 1989, a delegation visited the national audit offices of Finland and Sweden to gain knowledge and experience to draft the new legislation. At the end of the year, another visit was made by Finnish state auditors to Estonia, to present an overview of the Finnish auditing organization. On April 4, 1990, the Supreme Soviet of Estonia approved the dismantling of the People's Control Committee system. An attempt was made by a former leader of the People's Control Committee to reverse the decision, but this ultimately failed due to lack of political support.

The National Audit Office Act was passed on June 6, 1990, which meant the restoration of the National Audit Office of Estonia. On September 20, Hindrek-Peeter Meri was appointed the Auditor General. On November 1, the institution started its work in the former ESSR Planning Committee building at Suur-Ameerika 1, Tallinn. In February 1991, the office moved to another building at Narva maantee 4. On August 20, 1991, the Republic of Estonia officially declared the restoration of independence. In October 1992, the National Audit Office of Estonia became a member of the International Organization of Supreme Audit Institutions, and on 16 April 1993, became a member of EUROSAI. Estonia, Latvia and Lithuania signed an agreement on the cooperation of their respective audit offices in October 1994.

On 31 October 1997, Hindrek-Peeter Meri's term concluded and Rein Söörd temporarily became the acting Auditor General. Juhan Parts took over the position on June 9, 1998. In 2000, the National Audit Office was reorganized with the establishment of three auditing departments, based on the types of audits instead of fields of audit. A new National Audit Office Act was passed on January 29, 2002. By his own request, Juhan Parts was released from his position on October 8, 2002. Until the appointment of a new person, Jüri Kõrge became the acting Auditor General. On April 1, 2003, Mihkel Oviir was appointed to the position of Auditor General. On February 26, 2008, he started his second term. On April 7, 2013, his second term ended and Alar Karis took over his position. The institution was restructured on October 9, 2017, with the dissolution of previous departments and establishment of the Audit Department and the Development and Administrative Service. On April 9, 2018, Janar Holm became the new Auditor General.

== Structure ==
The National Audit Office of Estonia is headed by the Auditor General, who is proposed by the President and appointed by the parliament for a term of five years. The institution consists of two main departments - the Audit Department and the Development and Administrative Service.

The Audit Department is responsible for carrying out financial, compliance and performance audits. It is led by the Director of Audit, who is responsible for coordinating the work of audit groups, which are in turn led by audit managers. Altogether there are seven audit groups for different areas.

The Development and Administrative Service supports the Audit Department and the Auditor General in their tasks. It is led by the Director, who is responsible for coordinating the work of the institution and supporting the Auditor General in various administrative tasks.
