= Arnold Sinisalu =

Estonian police officer and lawyer (born 1970)

Arnold Sinisalu (born 20 February 1970 in Kärdla, Soviet Union) is an Estonian police officer and lawyer.

Since 1993, he has worked at Estonian Internal Security Service. Since 2013, he is the chief of Estonian Internal Security Service.

In 2021, he was awarded with Order of the Cross of the Eagle, II class.
