= Chancellor of Justice (Estonia) =

Chancellor of Justice of Estonia

- Õiguskantsler
- Small Coat of Arms of Estonia
- Incumbent; Olari Koppel; Acting since 12 March 2026
- The Office of the Chancellor of Justice
- Nominator: President of Estonia
- Appointer: Riigikogu
- Term length: 7 years
- Constituting instrument: Constitution of Estonia
- Formation: 1938; 1993 (recreated)
- First holder: Anton Palvadre
- Deputy: Olari Koppel
- Website: Official Website

The Estonian Chancellor of Justice (Estonian: Õiguskantsler) is an independent supervisor of the basic principles of the Constitution of Estonia and the protector of individual rights. The institution seeks to ensure that authorities fulfil the obligations deriving from the principles of the rule of law and protection of human and social rights, human dignity, freedom, equality and democracy. The Chancellor of Justice is appointed to office by the Riigikogu on the proposal of the President.

== History ==
The institution of the Chancellor of Justice was originally established by the 1938 Constitution but ceased to operate in Estonia during the Soviet era. Re-established in 1993, it combines the function of the general body of petition and the guardian of constitutionality. Such a combined competence is unique internationally. The institution is independent of the legislative, executive or judicial powers, and reviews the application of the legislative and executive powers of the state and of local governments to verify conformity with the Constitution and the laws. The institution reports annually to the Riigikogu. In 2026, following Ülle Madise's election as President, Olari Koppel the Deputy Chancellor of Justice assumed office on an interim basis.

== Role ==
The institution supervises the conformity of the laws of the Riigikogu and international agreements, decrees of the President, and regulations of the government, ministers and local governments, with the constitution and laws. Since the office was re-established in 1993, the Chancellor of Justice has made several hundred requests for bringing various legislative acts into conformity with the Constitution. In most cases the requests were complied with. Chancellors who finds that a legal act does not conform with the constitution or other laws will make a proposition to change the act within 20 days. If a correction is not made, the Chancellor will make a referral to the Supreme Court to declare the act or some of its provisions void.

The Chancellor of Justice may also submit their opinion to the Supreme Court in constitutional review court proceedings, or initiate disciplinary proceedings with regard to judges. The institution, which already had the function of inspecting places of detention, has served since 2007 as Estonia's national preventive mechanism under the Optional Protocol to the Convention Against Torture.

The function of ombudsman was entrusted to the Chancellor of Justice in 1999. In that role the Chancellor of Justice monitors whether state agencies or officials comply with people's fundamental rights and freedoms and with the principles of good governance, and addresses complaints of maladministration. In 2004 the ombudsman functions expanded to cover local governments, legal persons in public law and private persons who exercise public functions. The Chancellor of Justice can carry out conciliation proceedings when it is alleged that discrimination has occurred on the grounds of sex, race, nationality, colour, language, origin, religious or other conviction, property or social status, age, disability, sexual orientation or other grounds specified in law.

== List of chancellors of justice ==
- Anton Palvadre 1938–1940
- Richard Övel 1944–1949
- Artur Mägi 1949–1981 (In exile)
- Eerik-Juhan Truuväli 1993–2000
- Allar Jõks 2001–2008
- Indrek Teder 2008–2015
- Ülle Madise 2015–2026
- Olari Koppel 2026–present (interim)
