= Mihkel Oviir =

Estonian lawyer

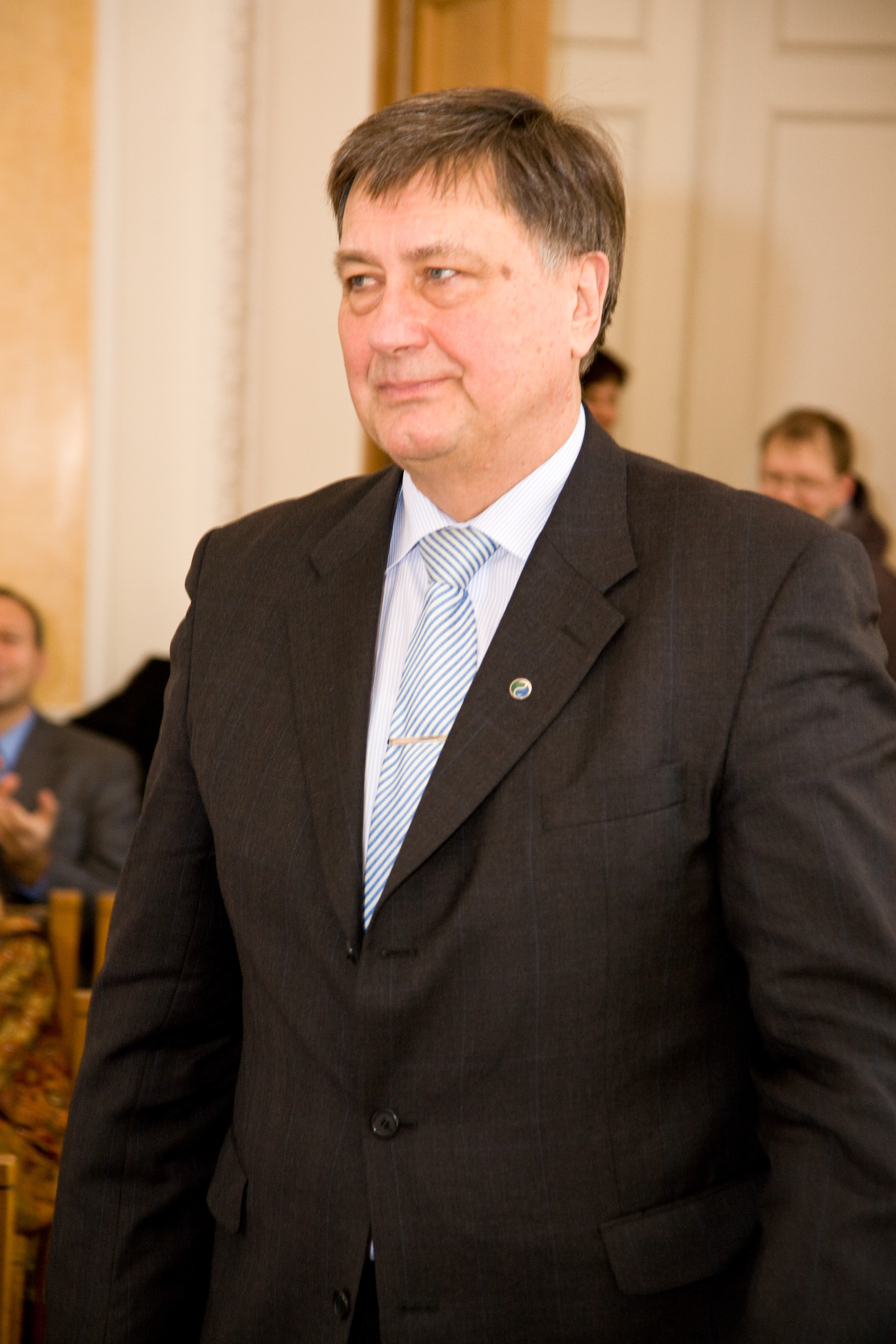
Mihkel Oviir

Mihkel Oviir (born 11 October 1942 in Märjamaa) is an Estonian lawyer.

In 1975, he graduated from Tartu University's Faculty of Law.

Before 2003, he worked almost 30 years at Ministry of Justice, being on different posts.

2003–2013, he was Auditor General of Estonia.
