= Janar Holm =

Estonian civil servant (born 1976)

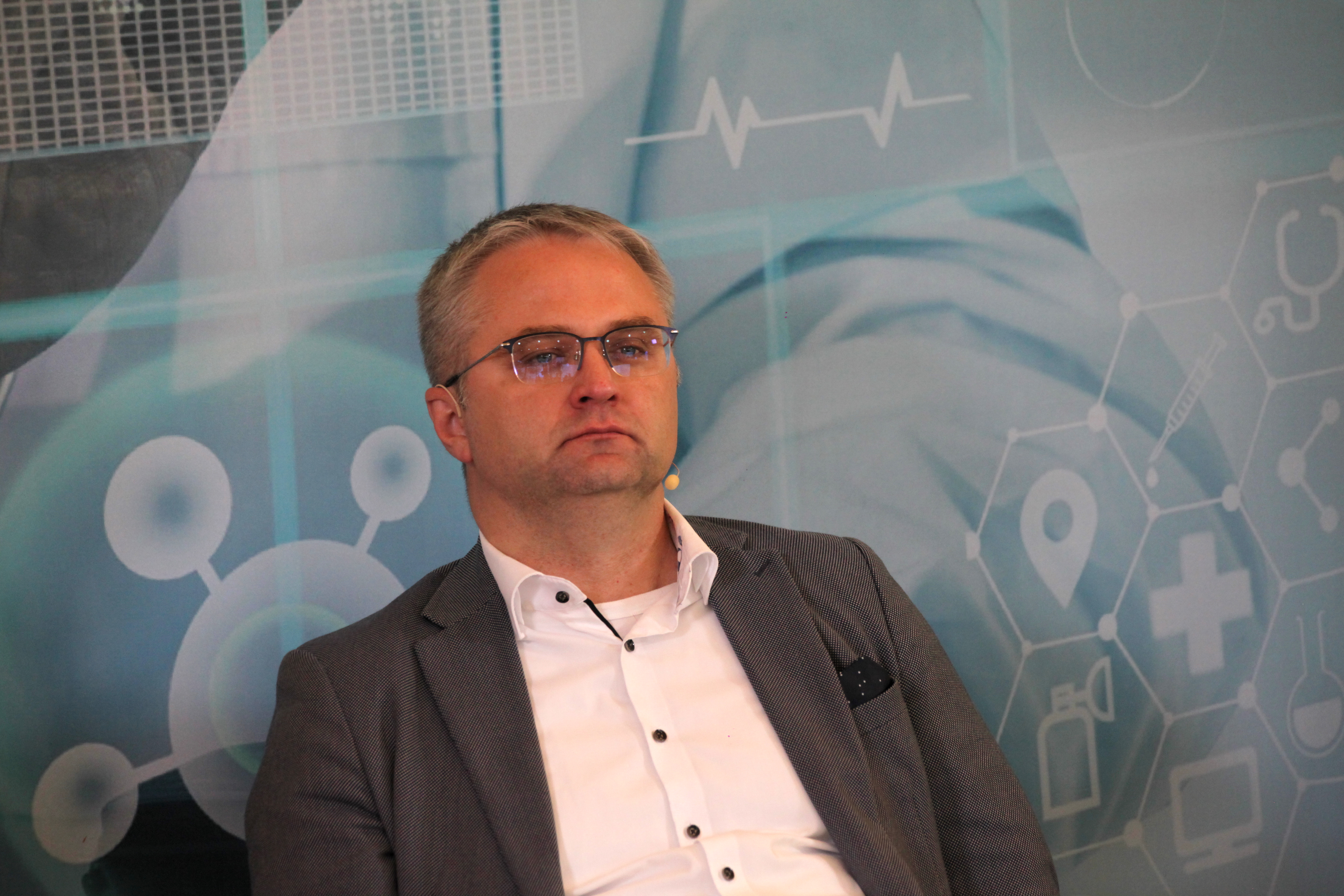
Janar Holm at the Opinion Festival 2021 in Paide, Estonia

Janar Holm (born 17 August 1976 in Kuressaare) is an Estonian civil servant.

Since on 7 March 2018, he is Auditor General of Estonia.

2004–2006, he was the director of the National Examinations and Qualifications Centre.
