= Tallinn University of Technology =

University in Tallinn, Estonia

- Tallinna Tehnikaülikool
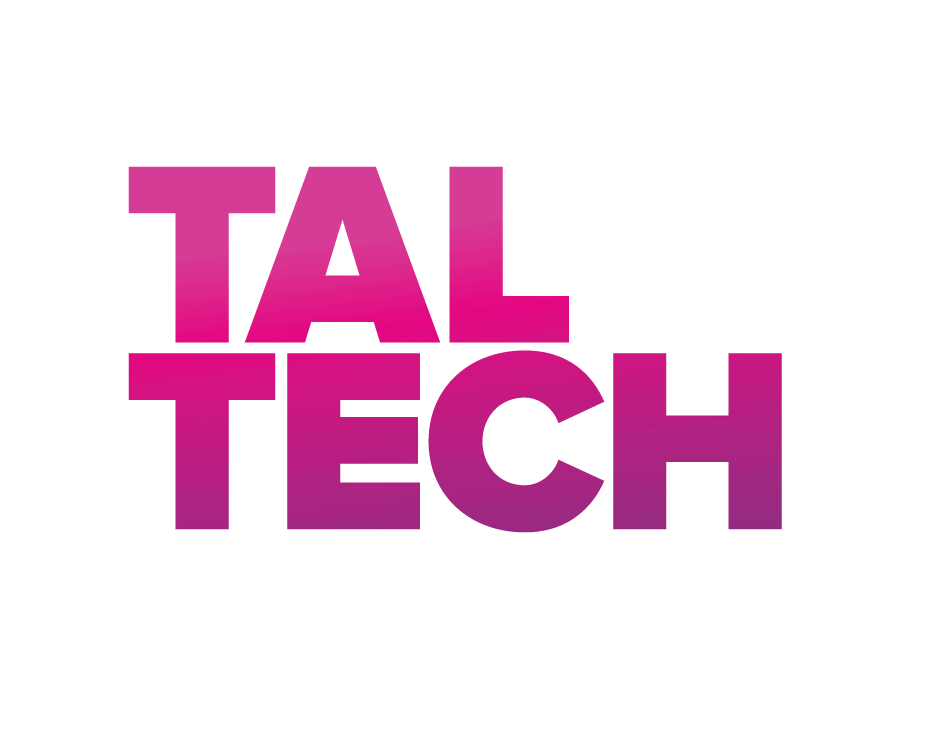
- Other names: TalTech
- Motto: Mente et manu
- Motto in English: With wisdom and hands
- Type: Public
- Established: 1918; 108 years ago
- Affiliations: BALTECH, NORDTEK, UNICA, SEFI, EUA, EAIE, NAFSA
- Budget: €119 million
- Rector: Tiit Land
- Academic staff: 985; international 168
- Students: 11,000; international 1,500
- Location: Tallinn, Estonia; 59.3950°N 24.6719°E
- Colours: White; Magenta; Burgundy
- Website: www.taltech.ee

University rankings

Regional – Overall
- QS Emerging Europe and Central Asia: 38 (2022)

Established in 1918, Tallinn University of Technology (TalTech; Estonian: Tallinna Tehnikaülikool) is the only technical university in Estonia. TalTech, in the capital city of Tallinn, is a university for engineering, business, public administration and maritime affairs. TalTech has colleges in Tartu and Kohtla-Järve. Despite the similar names, Tallinn University and Tallinn University of Technology are separate institutions.

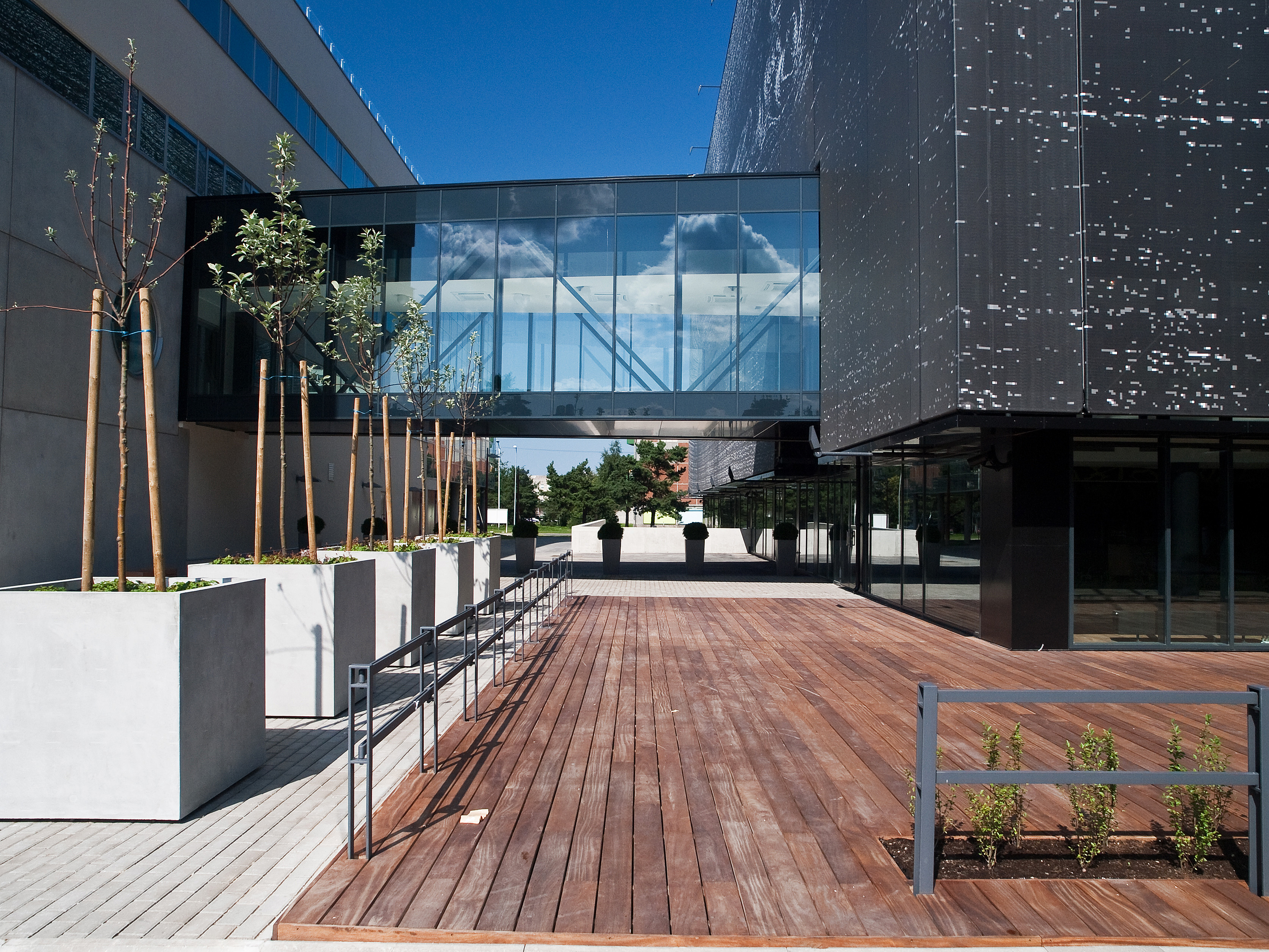
Campus of Tallinn University of Technology

== History ==
In the early twentieth century, Estonia recognised an urgent need for locally trained engineering specialists. Until then, young people from Estonia had received their specialist education in St. Petersburg, Germany or Riga. Opportunities had to be sought for engineering-minded people to acquire an Estonian-based education which was adapted to local conditions and needs; Estonia was in the process of establishing itself as an independent country.

On 17 September 1918, the Estonian Engineering Society opened an Estonian-based engineering school named Special Engineering Courses. That date has been recognised as the founding date of Tallinn University of Technology. Programmes were offered in mechanical, electrical, civil and hydraulic engineering, shipbuilding and architecture. In 1919, the school became the private Tallinn College of Engineering, which in 1920 was declared a state institution. Teachers' efforts to develop an Estonian terminology for science and technology proved fruitful and the first engineering books were published. In 1923, the first engineering graduation theses were defended in Estonia. In the same year, a state laboratory of materials testing opened for research work.

By the 15 September 1936 Act of the Head of State, the school was granted university status, and named Tallinn Technical Institute. The institute had two faculties: civil and mechanical engineering and chemistry and mining. In 1938, the name Tallinn Technical University (Tallinna Tehnikaülikool, TTÜ in Estonian) was effective. In 1940 the Faculty of Economics, in 1958 the Faculty of Power Engineering and in 1965 the Faculty of Control Engineering were founded. After 2003 the university was known in English as Tallinn University of Technology (TUT).

On 1 July 2008, TTÜ took over International University Audentes (IUA), which became part of the Faculty of Economics and Business Administration, except the Law School which joined the Faculty of Social Sciences. In 2014 an agreement for a merger of the Estonian Maritime Academy with TTÜ was signed.

On 16 November 2016, TTÜ and the Estonian Information Technology College signed a merger agreement. Since 1 August 2017, the IT College is a part of TTÜ.

On 17 September 2018, Tallinn University of Technology adopted a new short name TalTech, replacing the previous abbreviations such as TTÜ, TUT and TTU.

== TalTech today ==
There are over 30 fully accredited international degree programmes (4 Bachelor programmes, 18 Master programmes and 10 PhD programmes) that are available fully in English.

TalTech conducts research and develops high-tech applications in many fields:

- Organic and analytic chemistry (Chemistry)
- Food biotechnology and neurobiology (Biotechnology)
- Geology (Earth Sciences)
- Power converter research (Power Electronics)
- Solar cell materials and tribomaterials (Material Sciences)
- Computer system research and biorobotics (ICT)
- Near-zero energy building (Civil Engineering)
- Public administration (Social Sciences)

== Rankings ==
University rankings

Global – Overall
- QS World: =635 (2026)
- THE World: 601-800

Tallinn University of Technology is the third highest-ranking university in the Baltic states, placing in the 601-800 bracket in Times Higher Education World University Rankings, the university's best-ranked departments are the life sciences and social sciences departments, which are in 176-200 and 201-250 brackets respectively. TalTech ranks in the 601-700 bracket in QS World University rankings (behind Tartu University and Vilnius University). In QS University Rankings for Eastern Europe and Central Asia 2021, TalTech ranked 31st, placing it among the top ten technical universities in the region and confirming its status as the best technical university in the Baltics. TalTech is also in the 301-500 bracket in the QS Graduate Employability Rankings.

== Schools ==
- School of Engineering: Dean Fjodor Sergejev
- School of Business and Governance: Dean Associate Professor Mari Avarmaa
- School of Science: Dean Prof. Andrus Salupere
- School of Information Technologies: Dean Prof. Gert Jervan
- Estonian Maritime Academy: Director Roomet Leiger

== Departments ==
- Department of Computer Systems: Director Margus Kruus
- Department of Software Science: Director Marko Kääramees
- Department of Health Technologies: Director Assistant Professor Jana Holmar
- Thomas Johann Seebeck Department of Electronics: Director Alar Kuusik
- IT College: Director Sirja Sulakatko
- Department of Civil Engineering and Architecture: Director Prof. Jarek Kurnitski
- Department of Electrical Power Engineering and Mechatronics: Director Mart Landsberg
- Department of Energy Technology: Director Prof. Alar Konist
- Department of Materials and Environmental Technology: Director Prof. Maarja Grossberg-Kuusk
- Department of Mechanical and Industrial Engineering: Director Prof. Kristo Karjust
- Tartu College: Director Associate Professor Aime Ruus
- Virumaa College: Director Mare Roosileht
- Estonian Centre of Engineering Pedagogy: Head of Centre Tiia Rüütmann
- Department of Geology: Director Prof. Olle Hints
- Department of Chemistry and Biotechnology: Director Pirjo Spuul
- Department of Cybernetics: Acting director Prof. Jaan Janno
- Department of Marine Systems: Director Rivo Uiboupin
- Department of Economics and Finance: Director Associate Professor Karin Jõeveer
- Ragnar Nurkse Department of Innovation and Governance: Director Prof. Erkki Karo
- Department of Law: Director Prof. Tanel Kerikmäe
- Department of Business Administration: Director Merli Reidorf

=== Tallinn University of Technology Library ===
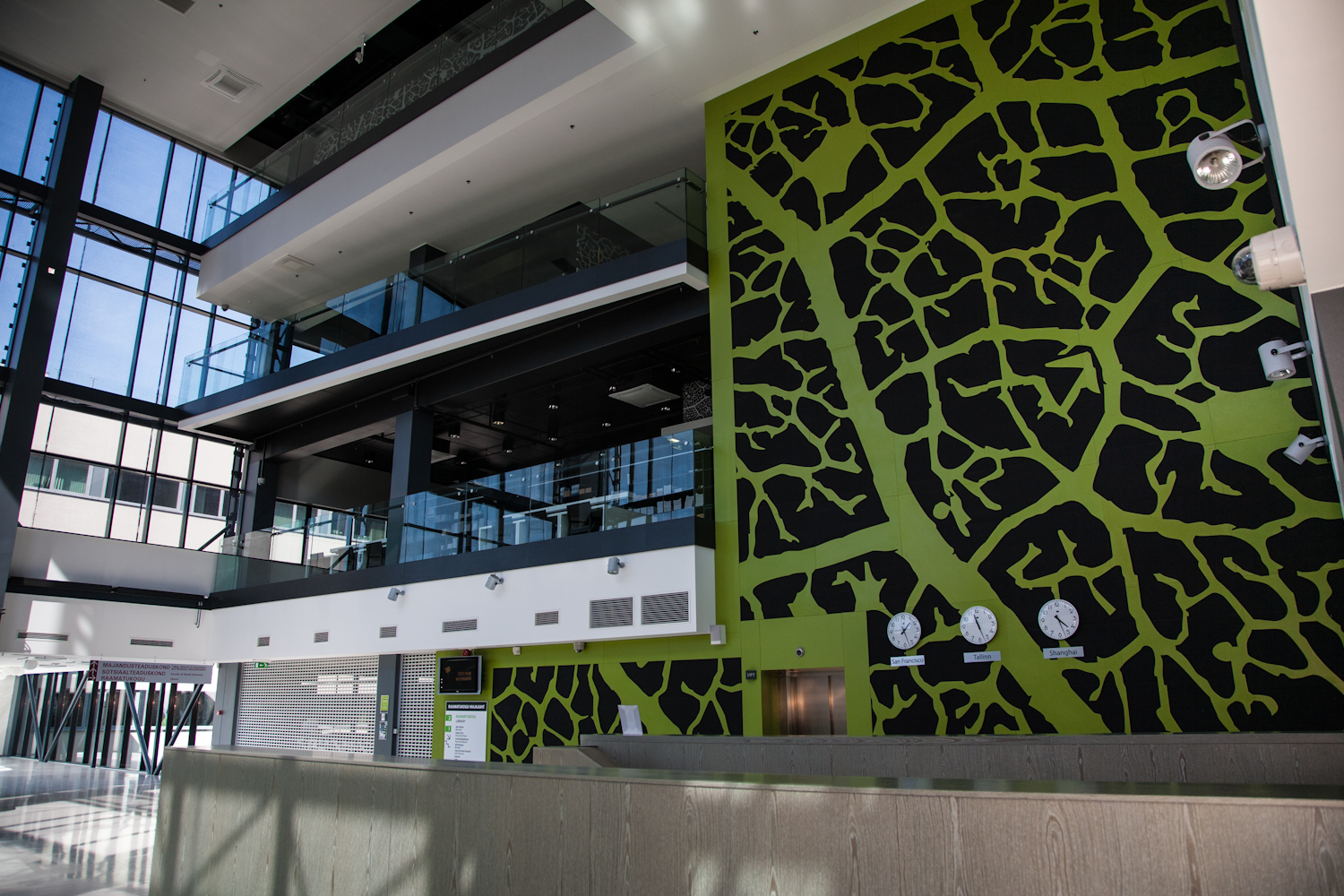
The new library building of Tallinn University of Technology

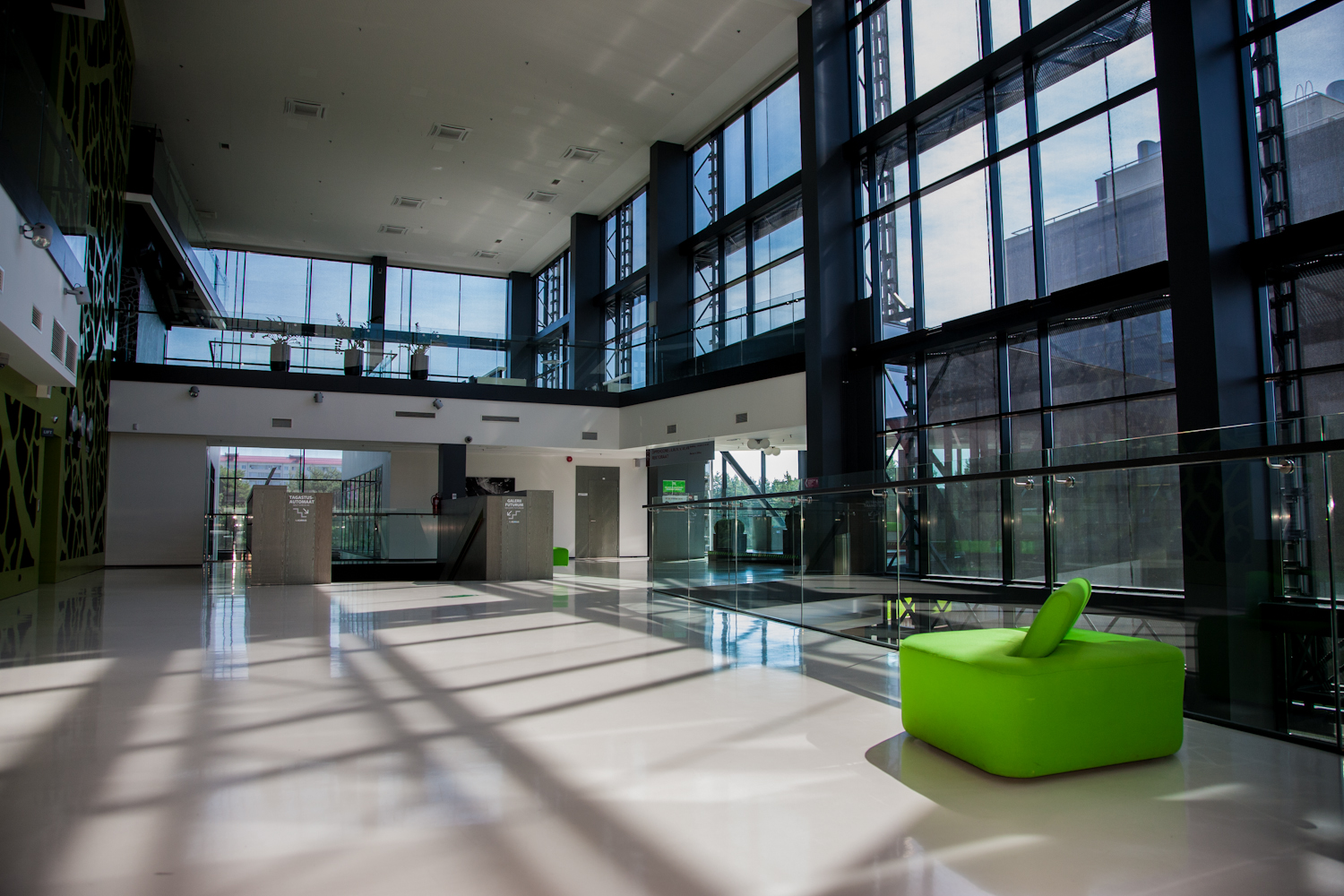
The entrance of the Library

The history of the library goes back to 1919.

== International degree programmes in English ==
The internationalization of higher education is one of the key strategic goals of Tallinn University of Technology. The university offers over 30 degree programmes in English: 4 Bachelor programmes, 18 Master programmes and 9 PhD programmes.

Bachelor's level programmes in English:

- Cyber Security Engineering (BSc)
- International Business Administration (BA)
- Law (BA)
- Integrated Engineering (BSc)

Master's level programmes in English:

- Cyber Security (MSc)
- Communicative Electronics (MSc)
- Computer and Systems Engineering (MSc)
- Technology Governance and Sustainability (MA)
- E-Governance Technologies and Services (MSc)
- Digital Health (MSc)
- Software Engineering (MSc)
- International Business Administration (MBA)
- Entrepreneurial Management (MBA)
- Law (MA)
- Public Sector Innovation and e-Governance (MSc)
- Industrial Engineering and Management (MSc)
- Environmental Engineering and Management (MSc)
- Design and Technology Futures (MSc)
- Materials and Processes for Sustainable Energetics (MSc)
- Technology of Wood, Plastics and Textiles (MSc)
- Mechatronics (MSc)
- Applied Physics (MSc)

PhD programmes in English:

- Building and Civil Engineering and Architecture
- Chemical and Materials Technology
- Chemistry and Biotechnology
- Economics and Business Administration
- Electrical Power Engineering and Mechatronics
- Information and Communication Technology
- Physical Sciences
- Public Administration
- Mechanical Engineering

== Alumni ==
Besides the entire technological elite of Estonia, alumni include numerous industrialists, businesspeople, and athletes.

- Irina Embrich, Olympic champion épée fencer
- Jüri Engelbrecht, the Vice President and former President of the Estonian Academy of Science
- Priit Kasesalu, one of the initial developers of Skype
- Erika Kirpu, Olympic champion épée fencer
- Taavi Kotka, former Chief Information Officer of Estonian Government and leader of e-Residency programme
- Jakob Kübarsepp, engineer and materials scientist, professor emeritus and senior researcher TalTech
- Jaak Leimann, former Minister of Economic Affairs of Estonia
- Toomas Luman, Estonian entrepreneur
- Jüri Mõis, former Mayor of Tallinn, Minister of the Interior, and one of the founders of Hansabank
- Rain Ottis, cybersecurity researcher
- Jüri Ratas, President of the Riigikogu, former Mayor of Tallinn and Prime Minister of Estonia
- Tiit Vähi, the former Prime Minister and eminent industrialist

== Partner universities ==
The cooperation, especially with European universities is more focused for curricula development, project cooperation and networking. In Europe, student and staff mobility is mainly organised under Erasmus programme. A selection of university-wide partnerships:

- (China) Shanghai University
- (Czech Republic) Czech Technical University in Prague
- (Czech Republic) Charles University
- (Czech Republic) Brno University of Technology
- (Czech Republic) Czech University of Life Sciences Prague
- (Czech Republic) Masaryk University
- (Czech Republic) Mendel University in Brno
- (Czech Republic) Metropolitan University Prague
- (Czech Republic) Palacký University Olomouc
- (Czech Republic) Technical University of Liberec
- (Czech Republic) Tomas Bata University in Zlin
- (Czech Republic) University of Chemistry and Technology, Prague
- (Czech Republic) University of Economics, Prague
- (Czech Republic) University of Hradec Kralove
- (Czech Republic) University of West Bohemia
- (Czech Republic) VŠB - Technical University of Ostrava
- (Denmark) Aalborg University
- (Pakistan) National University of Science and Technology
- (Finland) Aalto University
- (Finland) Tampere University
- (Finland) Lappeenranta-Lahti University of Technology LUT
- (France) University of Strasbourg
- (France) Ecole Centrale de Nantes
- (France) University of Bordeaux
- (France) Grenoble Institute of Technology
- (Georgia (country)) Ivane Javakhishvili Tbilisi State University
- (Georgia (country)) Caucasus University
- (Germany) Technical University of Munich
- (Germany) Technische Universität Darmstadt
- (Germany) Kiel University of Applied Sciences
- (Germany) Dresden University of Technology
- (Greece) Agricultural University of Athens
- (Greece) Aristotle University of Thessaloniki (AUTh)
- (Hungary) Budapest University of Technology and Economics
- (India) IIT Delhi
- (Italy) Politecnico di Torino
- (Italy) Università degli Studi di Bergamo
- (South Korea) Kangwon National University
- (Latvia) Riga Technical University
- (Lithuania) Vilnius Gediminas Technical University
- (Lithuania) Kaunas University of Technology
- (Netherlands) Delft University of Technology
- (Netherlands) University of Groningen
- (Netherlands) University of Maastricht
- (Norway) Norwegian University of Science and Technology
- (Norway) University of Oslo
- (Poland) University of Warsaw
- (Portugal) University of Porto
- National University of Singapore
- (Spain) Universitat Politecnica de Catalunya
- (Spain) University of Alicante
- (Sweden) KTH Royal Institute of Technology
- (Sweden) Lund University
- (Sweden) Chalmers University of Technology
- (Switzerland) University of Geneva
- (Thailand) National Institute of Development Administration
- (Turkey) Istanbul Technical University
- (United Kingdom) University of Edinburgh
- (United Kingdom) University of Brighton
- National Technical University of Ukraine
- (United States) The Citadel
- (United States) The University of California, Berkeley
- (United States) Stanford University
- (United States) Salisbury University
- (United States) University of New Mexico
- National Taiwan University of Science and Technology
