= Niit (surname) =

Family name

Origin
- Language: Estonian
- Meaning: mesophyte grassland (meadow or hayfield), thread
- Region of origin: Estonia

Other names
- Related names: Aas, Aasmaa, Aru, Heinmaa, Karjamaa, Rohumaa, Luht, Põld, Põldmaa, Põllu, Nurm, Nurme

Niit is an Estonian surname meaning both a type of mesophyte grassland (a meadow or hayfield) and thread.

As of 1 January 2021, 158 men and 182 women in Estonia bear the surname Niit. Niit is ranked as the 431st most common surname for men in Estonia, and 393rd for women. The surname Niit is most common in Saare County, where 24.41 per 10,000 inhabitants of the county bear the surname.

Notable people bearing the surname Niit include:

- Ellen Niit (1928–2016), children's writer, poet and translator
- Eva-Maria Niit (born 2002), footballer
- Heldur Niit (1928–2010), folklorist and literary scholar
- Malle Niit (born 1938), medical scientist, pediatrician and hygienist
- Marek Niit (born 1987), sprinter
- Toomas Niit (1953–2020), psychologist
