= Gambling in Estonia =

Gambling in Estonia is relatively young. While Estonia was a part of the USSR, all types of gambling activities were banned. Despite the prohibition, illegal casinos still functioned, but the real history of gambling started in 1994-1995 when the first Lottery Act of 1994 and the first Gambling Act of 1995 came into power. As the capital, Tallinn has more casinos than any other Estonian town. As of September 2010, there were 33 casinos in Tallinn. That's 3 times less than in 2008, when 91 gambling venues operated in this city. According to experts, the main reasons for such decrease were the consequences of the crisis and the adoption of the new gambling law in 2008. The legal age for playing at casinos is 21.

== Gaming law ==
The latest Gambling Act was adopted in 2008 and came into power at the beginning of 2009. The main advantage of this piece of legislation was that it provided legal basis for the regulation of the rapidly developing online gambling industry. The Act regulates the gambling industry in today's Estonia. Before this act came into power, two main pieces of legislation had been used – the Gambling Act of 1995 and the Lotteries Act of 1994. These two acts very soon proved to be insufficient due to the rapid development of technology in the field of gambling industry. In particular, online gambling services remained unregulated.

The Gambling Act 1995 introduced 4 types of gambling, namely games of chance, games of skill, totalisators, and betting. According to this Act, to be able to offer gambling services, all operators should have obtained an activity license and an operation permit. Individual activity licenses should have been obtained for all types of gambling and were issued for 10 years. Operation permit was provided for a term of 5 years and was meant to indicate the location of the gambling place. Those applicants whose license applications were rejected, could turn to the administrative court to resolve the issue.

The new Gambling Act annulled the 2 previous acts, yet most of the main postulates remained unchanged. In particular, the 4 types of gambling named in the Gambling Act 1995 are also described as the main categories of gambling in the new Act. The requirement to obtain an activity license and an operation permit to legally offer gambling services have also remained unchanged.

Today, the issue of activity licences and operating permits for gambling and lotteries is the responsibility of the Estonian Tax and Customs Board.

Since Estonia is a member of the European Union, the gambling law of the country should conform to the laws of the Community. Yet, even those operators licensed in other countries members of the EU should fulfil the same requirements as the unlicensed ones, i.e. apply for the activity and operation licenses and provide the evidence to the Estonian Tax and Customs Board that they are capable of sustaining legal and strong business. These stringent rules are contrary to the principles of free competition that are promoted by the European Commission, but Estonian authorities say that this is just a part of their step-by-step approach to ensuring that gambling industry is properly regulated and causes no harm to the society.

== Online gambling ==
Estonia started imposing online gaming regulations in 2010. The two main laws that control online gaming in the country are the Gambling Act and the Gambling Tax Act. In 2010, online gambling became legal in Estonia. The main reasons for this were the consequences of the world crisis 2008–2009. The country's economy was down, so online gambling was meant to become a new source of income. From January 2010, only local sites were allowed to offer their gambling services online. In January 2011 Estonia opened its gambling market to offshore operators, but on condition that they would get licenses from the Estonian authority. Alongside legalization of the market, Estonia started blocking unlicensed gambling sites that tried to offer their services to Estonian citizens.

== Lottery ==
Lotteries in Estonia can only be organized for the purposes of charity. Lotto, keno, bingo and scratchcard lotteries in Estonia are mostly offered by the state owned Eesti Loto. The company was established in 1991 and since then remained the main lottery operator. Before 2010, Eesti Loto had a 90% market share. In 2010, most licenses of other lottery operators have expired and since the new Gambling Act suggested quite strict rules for obtaining a new license, Eesti Loto remained a monopoly. In 2009, Estonian Prime Minister Andrus Ansip suggested privatizing the company to help the budget of Estonia, but as of 2011 it remained a property of the state.

Turnover of Eesti Loto in 2009 was €33 million of which 47% was paid out as prize money. The profits were distributed as follows: 32% science and education, 22% Olympic Committee, 10% other sports projects, 32% welfare projects, 4% cultural projects

In summer 2011, the Estonian Customer Protection Board started a battle with Eesti Loto. The reason for their action was that Eesti Loto published the jackpot estimates on a weekly basis for the two most popular lotteries. The Customer Protection Board claimed that it can be regarded as advertising of gambling, which is prohibited by the Advertising Act 2008. After the case has been taken to the court, Eesti Loto was granted the right to continue publishing the amounts of expected jackpots

The legal age for playing lotteries in Estonia is 18 as of 1 January 2026.

== Taxes ==
Taxation of gambling activities is currently regulated by the Gambling Tax Act adopted on 22 April 2009. It came into power in June 2009 following the adoption of the new Gambling Act. The new Act on taxation brought some changes to the gambling industry. First of all, it provided legal basis for the taxation of remote gambling which was overlooked in the previous version of the act. As of November 2011, operators of betting and remote gambling have to pay 5% tax on the net profit. Tax rates for gambling machines and gambling tables remained unchanged. Tax on the basis of the turnover for amusement game machines was replaced by a monthly fixed fee per machine. The lottery (numerical lottery) tax became 18% (deducted from the amount gained from the sale of tickets). Previously, the tax rate was 10%.
