= Maris Lauri =

Estonian politician (born 1966)

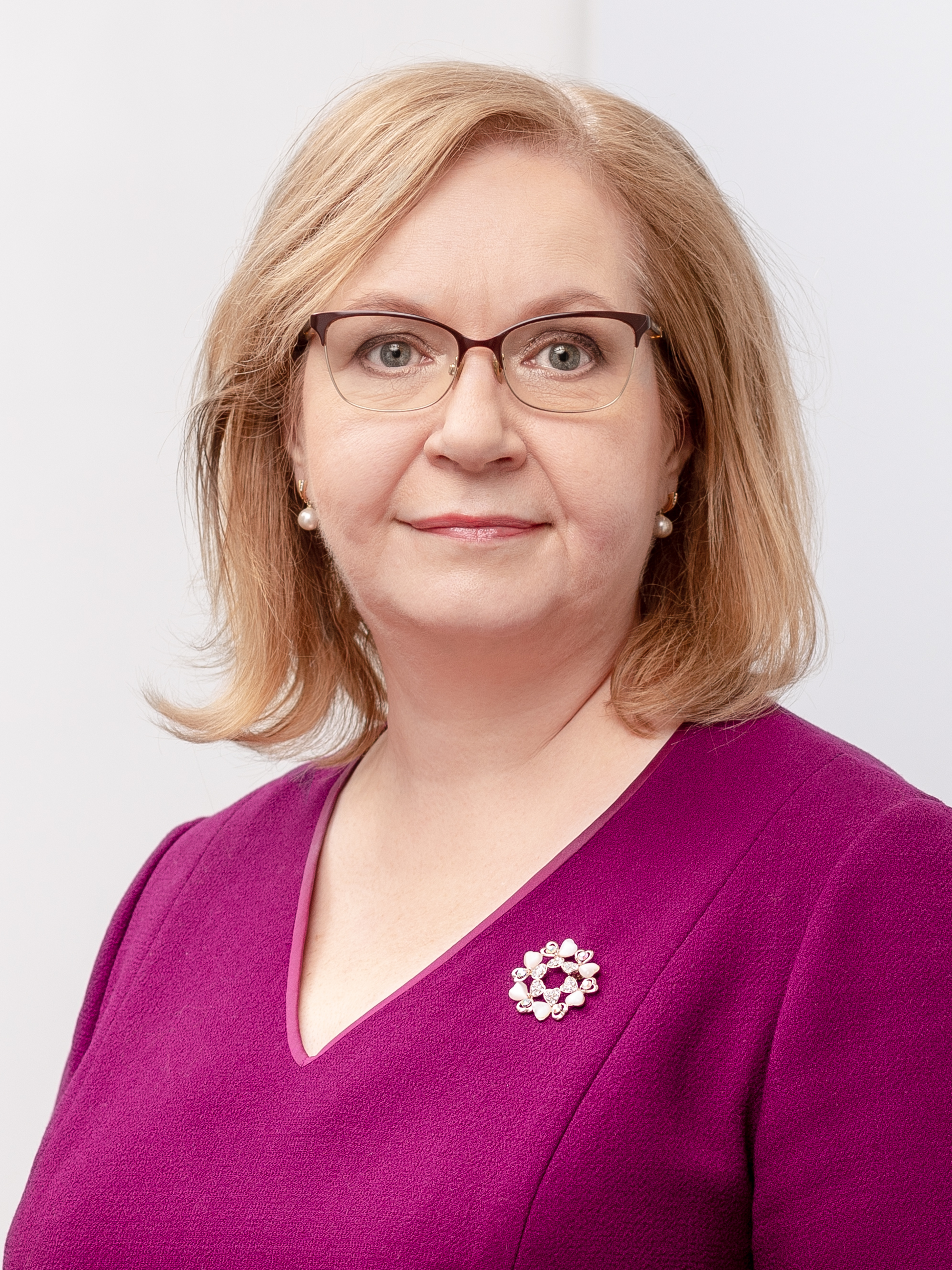

Minister of Justice
- In office 26 January 2021 – 18 July 2022
- Prime Minister: Kaja Kallas
- Preceded by: Raivo Aeg
- Succeeded by: Lea Danilson-Järg

Minister of Education and Research
- In office 12 September 2016 – 23 November 2016
- Prime Minister: Taavi Rõivas
- Preceded by: Jürgen Ligi
- Succeeded by: Mailis Reps

Minister of Finance
- In office 3 November 2014 – 9 April 2015
- Prime Minister: Taavi Rõivas
- Preceded by: Jürgen Ligi
- Succeeded by: Sven Sester

Personal details
- Born: 1 January 1966 (age 60) Kohtla-Järve, then part of Estonian SSR, Soviet Union
- Party: Reform Party
- Education: University of Tartu

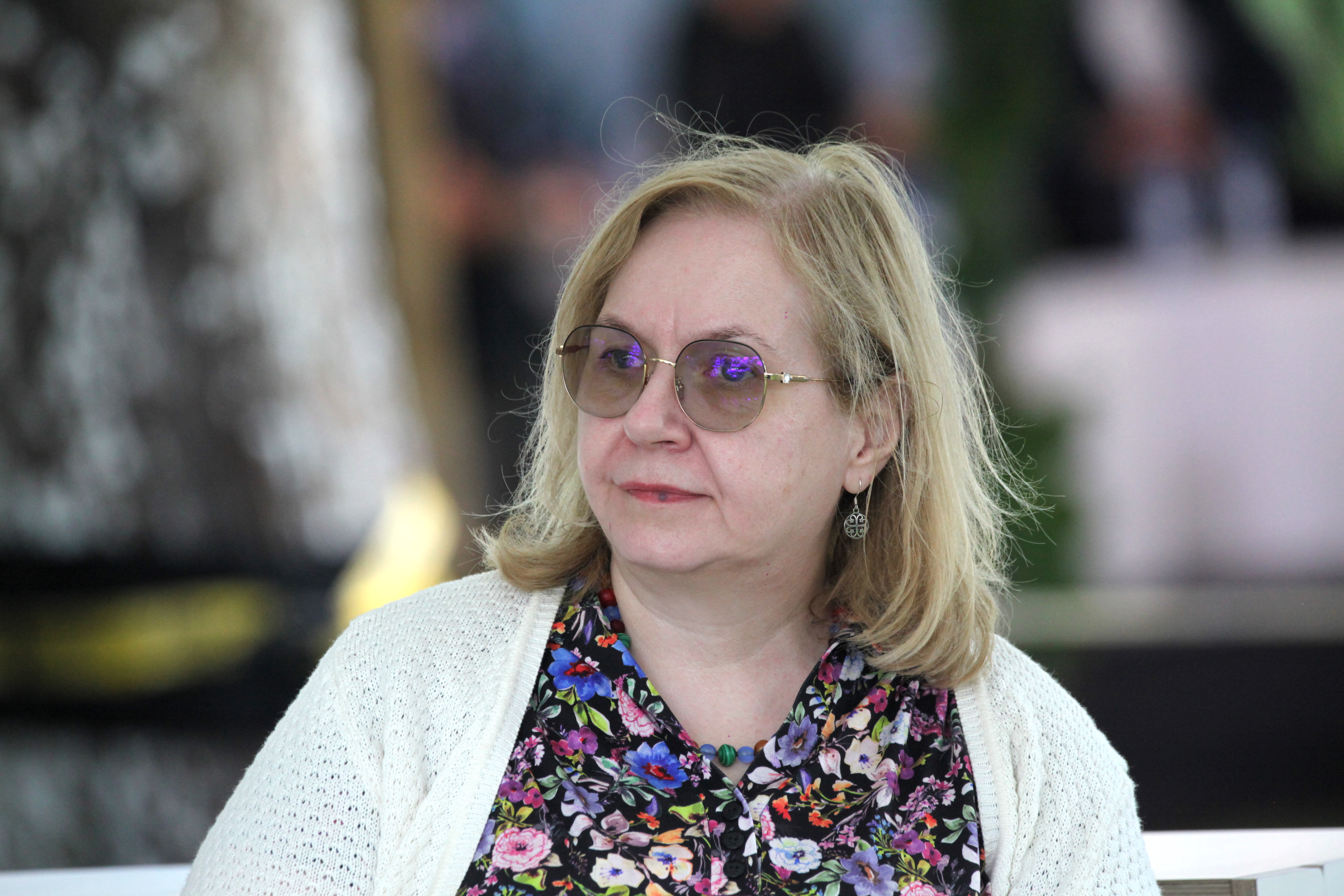
Maris Lauri at the Opinion Festival 2021 in Paide, Estonia

Maris Lauri (born 1 January 1966) is an Estonian politician, former Minister of Justice and a member of the Reform Party. She served as the Minister of Finance in Taavi Rõivas's first cabinet from November 2014 to April 2015 and later as the Minister of Education and Research in 2016. Before her nomination, Lauri worked as an adviser to the Prime Minister. Previously she worked as the head economist of Swedbank and for the Bank of Estonia.

Lauri was elected to the Riigikogu in the 2015 election with 4,019 personal votes. She was elected again to the Riigikogu in 2019.

She ran for the Riigikogu in the 2023 elections and garnered 4084 votes in the electoral district No. 3 (Tallinn's Mustamäe and Nõmme districts), securing her seat in the Riigikogu.

Political offices
Preceded by Jürgen Ligi	Minister of Finance; 2014–2015	Succeeded by Sven Sester
Preceded by Jürgen Ligi	Minister of Education and Research; 2016	Succeeded by Mailis Reps
Preceded by Raivo Aeg	Minister of Justice; 2021–2022	Succeeded by Lea Danilson-Järg
