= Heiki Loot =

Estonian state official

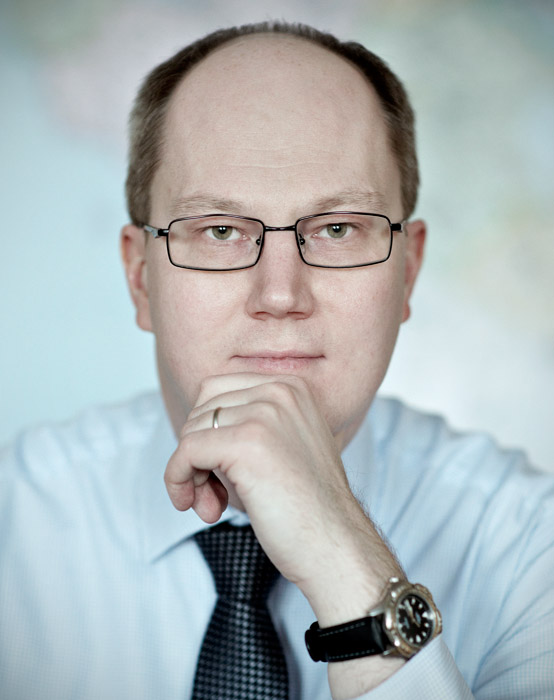
Heiki Loot

Heiki Loot (born 28 April 1971 in Tallinn) is an Estonian judge and former civil servant. From 2003 to 2018 he was the Secretary of State, the head of the Government Office. He resigned in 2018 and became a Supreme Court judge, where he is a member of Administrative Law Chamber and Constitutional Review Chamber.

Heiki Loot started his legal career in 1994 as the Assistant of the Chief Justice of the Supreme Court. From 1995 to 1998 he served as the Head of Public Law Department of the Ministry of Justice where he was responsible for legislative drafting and legal reform in constitutional and administrative law. He played a key role in writing the laws of the newly independent country and in establishing its institutions. From 1998 to 2003 he was rector of the Estonian Public Service Academy where he carried out reforms to build up a modern university of applied sciences and a civil service training center.

In 2003 Heiki Loot became the Secretary of State, the highest civil servant in the country. In this non-political position he served under seven Governments and four Prime Ministers.

As the Secretary of State he was responsible for supporting the Government and the Prime Minister in policy making and implementation and for leading the Government Office. He had a key role in developing the Government Office into a fully functional centre of government with a mission to provide not only technical but primarily policy planning and coordination services to the Government.

He was also responsible for coordination of preparations of the Estonian Presidency of the Council of the European Union in 2017 and centennial celebrations of the Republic of Estonia.

Chief Justice of the Supreme Court Priit Pikamäe recommended him to Supreme Court because his "past experience allows him to make a significant contribution to the Supreme Court and the development of administrative law."

As Secretary of State he oversaw the development of the Estonian digital services portfolio which is widely recognised as the world’s most advanced.

He was awarded the Order of the National Coat of Arms, Third Class at the annual state decorations in February 2019.

He is married and has three children.
