= Märt Rask =

Estonian lawyer

Chief Justice of the Supreme Court of Estonia
- In office 2004–2013
- Prime Minister: Andrus Ansip; Juhan Parts
- Preceded by: Uno Lõhmus
- Succeeded by: Priit Pikamäe

Minister of Justice
- In office 25 March 1999 – 10 April 2003
- Prime Minister: Mart Laar; Siim Kallas
- Preceded by: Paul Varul
- Succeeded by: Ken-Marti Vaher
- In office 30 January 1992 – 21 October 1992
- Prime Minister: Tiit Vähi
- Preceded by: Jüri Raidla
- Succeeded by: Kaido Kama

Minister of the Interior
- In office 3 November 1995 – 1 December 1996
- Prime Minister: Tiit Vähi
- Preceded by: Edgar Savisaar
- Succeeded by: Riivo Sinijärv

Personal details
- Born: 19 December 1950 (age 75)
- Party: Estonian Reform Party
- Education: University of Tartu

Märt Rask (born 19 December 1950) is an Estonian attorney, jurist, and politician who was the Estonian Minister of the Interior from 1995 to 1996, as well as being the Justice Minister in 1992 and from 1999 to 2003 and Chief Justice of the Supreme Court of Estonia from 2004 to 2013.

== Biography ==
Rask is the son of lawyer Valdeko Leeto (1927–1992). Rask's son, Rasmus Rask (born 1977) was a member of the Estonian Bar Association from 2000 to 2001. Rask graduated from the Faculty of Law of the University of Tartu in 1978. Starting 1 August 1978, he was a member of the Estonian SSR Lawyers' College. From 1978 to 1979, he worked as a legal adviser in Pärnu and Tallinn. He is currently a partner of Rask Advokaadibüroo.

=== Political career ===
Rask later became the Deputy Legal Director and Head of Legal Advice from 1979 to 1990, as well as the first Deputy Minister of Justice of the Estonian SSR from 1990 to 1992.

From 1995 to 1996, Rask was the Estonian Minister of the Interior, as well as being the Justice Minister in 1992 and from 1999 to 2003. From 2004 to 2013, Rask was the Chief Justice of the Supreme Court of Estonia. He retired from public life after being voted out of his last post. He was a legal adviser to former prime minister Taavi Rõivas.

Rask is a member of the Estonian Reform Party and was a member of the Riigikogu from 1999 to 2007 for their party.

In March 2001, the Ministry of Justice carried out a reform in the area of government of Märt Rask´, which abolished the former executive departments subordinated to county and city courts and appointed freelance bailiffs who had successfully passed the attestation. The superficial implementation of the reform and Märt Rask´'s incompetent behavior are reflected in the latter's directive, which imposed an unjustified fine of 50,000 kroons on bailiff Raul Uesson´. Raul Uesson appealed the minister's order to the court and won both the court of first and second instance. The court found that the order of the Minister of Justice had significantly violated the basic requirements for imposing a disciplinary sanction. The content of the disciplinary offense and the factual circumstances are not clear from the directive, the description of the offense does not correspond to the composition of the identified disciplinary offense.

== Awards ==
- 6 February 2006: Second Class of the Order of the White Star
