= Valimar =

Valimar may refer to:

- Valimar (or Valmar) the capital of Valinor, a fictional location in J. R. R. Tolkien's Middle-earth
- A Divine Knight character in The Legend of Heroes: Trails of Cold Steel video game
- Baron Valimar Mordis, a character in the Warcraft: The Sunwell Trilogy manga comic

== See also ==
- Valmar (disambiguation)
- Valamir, Roman king
