= Põld =

Family name

Põld is an Estonian surname (meaning field), and may refer to:

- Anna-Liisa Põld (born 1990), swimmer
- Georg Erich Põld (born 1952), politician
- Jüri Põld (1956–2025), judge
- Peeter Põld (1878–1930), pedagogic scientist, school director and politician
- Remy Põld (born 1992), basketball player
