= Kalle Laanet =

Estonian politician (born 1965)

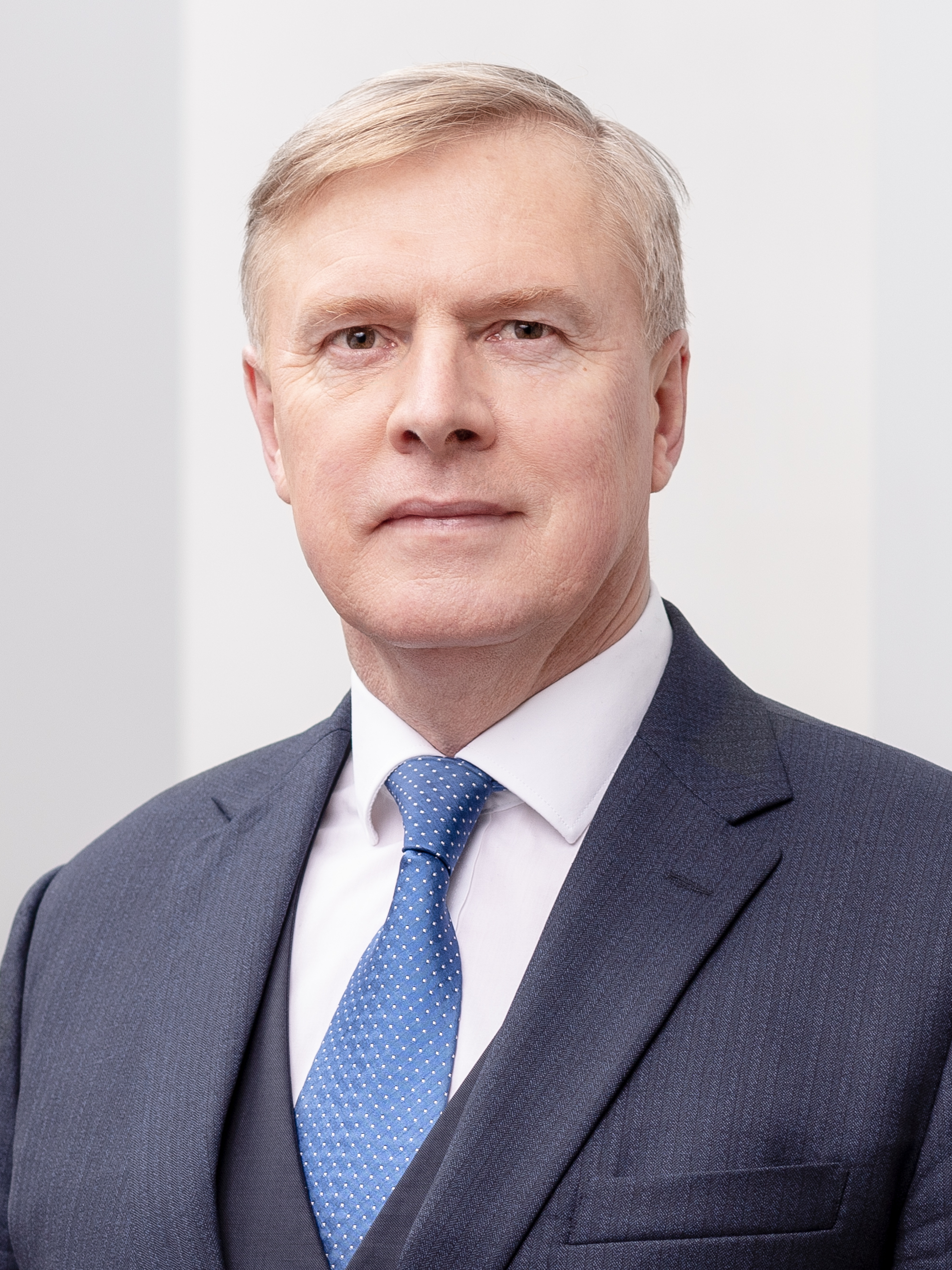
- Laanet in 2021

Minister of Justice
- In office 17 April 2023 – 1 April 2024
- Prime Minister: Kaja Kallas
- Preceded by: Lea Danilson-Järg
- Succeeded by: Madis Timpson

Minister of Defence
- In office 26 January 2021 – 18 July 2022
- Prime Minister: Kaja Kallas
- Preceded by: Jüri Luik
- Succeeded by: Hanno Pevkur

Minister of the Interior
- In office 13 April 2005 – 5 April 2007
- Prime Minister: Andrus Ansip
- Preceded by: Margus Leivo
- Succeeded by: Jüri Pihl

Personal details
- Born: 25 September 1965 (age 61) Orissaare, then part of Estonian SSR, Soviet Union
- Party: Reform Party (2014-present); Centre Party (2005-2012)
- Education: Concordia International University Estonia

Kalle Laanet (born 25 September 1965) is an Estonian politician and police officer. He is member of XIV Riigikogu. Since 2014 he belongs to Estonian Reform Party. He served as Minister of Justice from April 2023 to April 2024 in the third cabinet of Prime Minister Kaja Kallas.

From 2002 to 2004, he was the police prefect of Tallinn (Estonian: Tallinna politseiprefekt).

Between 2005 and 2007, he served as Minister of the Interior (Estonian: Eesti siseminister).

He has been a member of the XI, XII, XIII and XIV Riigikogu.

From 2021 to 2022, he was the Minister of Defence (Estonian: Eesti kaitseminister).

Laanet was sworn in as Minister of Justice in the third cabinet of Kaja Kallas on 17 April 2023. He left the cabinet on 1 April 2024, being succeeded by Madis Timpson.

== Legal issues ==
In May 2025, the Riigikogu voted to lift Laanet's parliamentary immunity to allow criminal proceedings concerning the alleged misuse of expenses reimbursements to continue; Laanet said he had not intended to claim public funds unlawfully and that he had disclosed the rental contracts.

On 9 February 2026, the Harju County Court found Laanet guilty of fraud related to housing rent reimbursements claimed in 2022–2023 while serving as minister and later as a member of the Riigikogu. Prosecutors said the reimbursements were based on a lease with a company owned by his stepson and totaled over €13,000; the court held that a stepchild counts as a related party and imposed a suspended prison sentence of one year and four months.

Political offices
Preceded by Lea Danilson-Järg	Minister of Justice; 2022–present	Incumbent
