= Lea Danilson-Järg =

Estonian politician (born 1977)

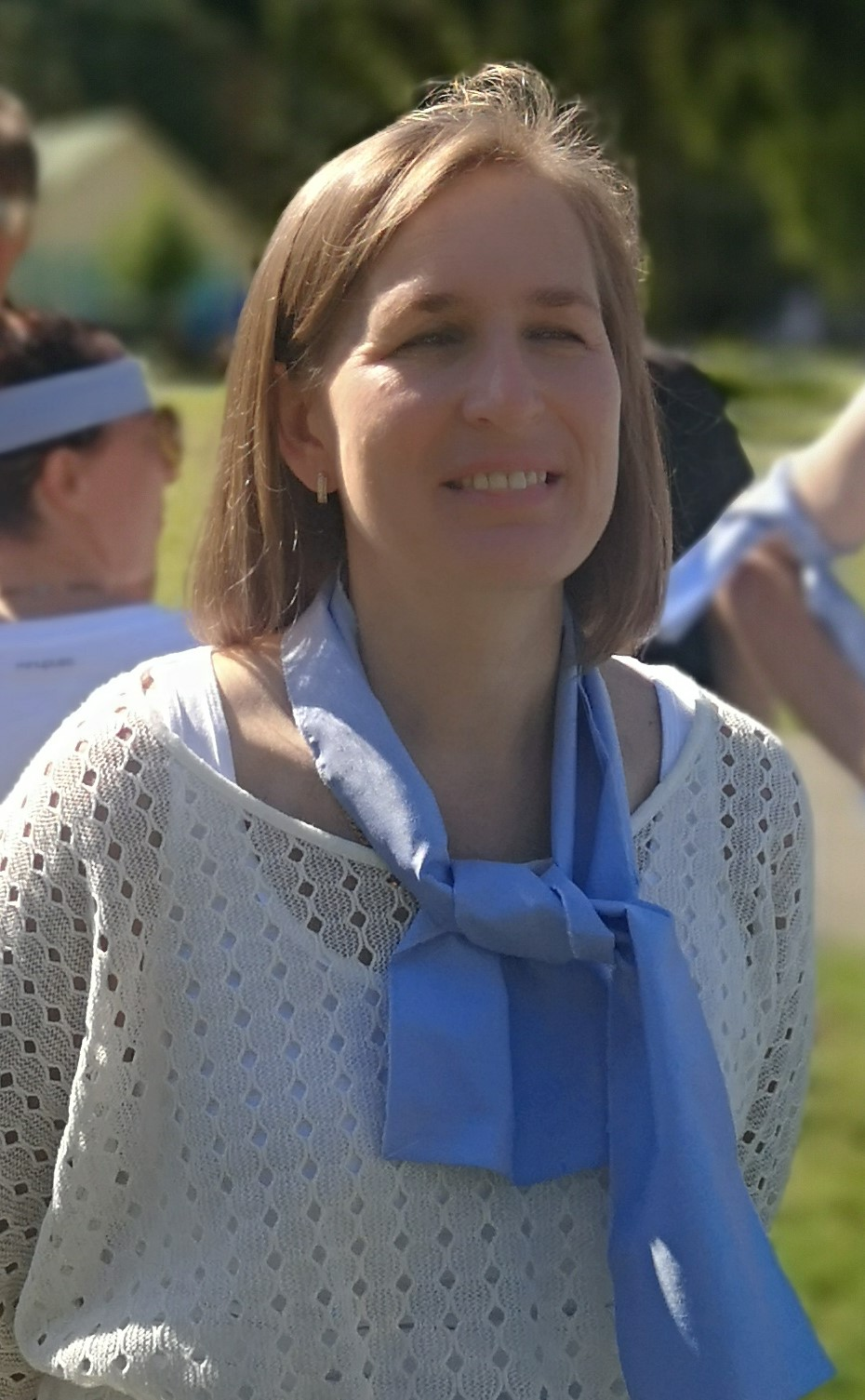
- Danilson-Järg in 2022

Minister of Justice
- In office 18 July 2022 – 17 April 2023
- Prime Minister: Kaja Kallas
- Preceded by: Maris Lauri
- Succeeded by: Kalle Laanet

Personal details
- Born: 27 November 1977 (age 48) Tallinn, then part of Estonian SSR, Soviet Union
- Party: Isamaa
- Education: Tallinn University of Technology

Lea Danilson-Järg (born 27 November 1977) is an Estonian politician. She served as Minister of Justice in the second cabinet of Prime Minister Kaja Kallas.

Political offices
Preceded by Maris Lauri	Minister of Justice; 2022–2023	Succeeded by Kalle Laanet
