= Kaarel Parts =

Estonian lawyer, judge and politician

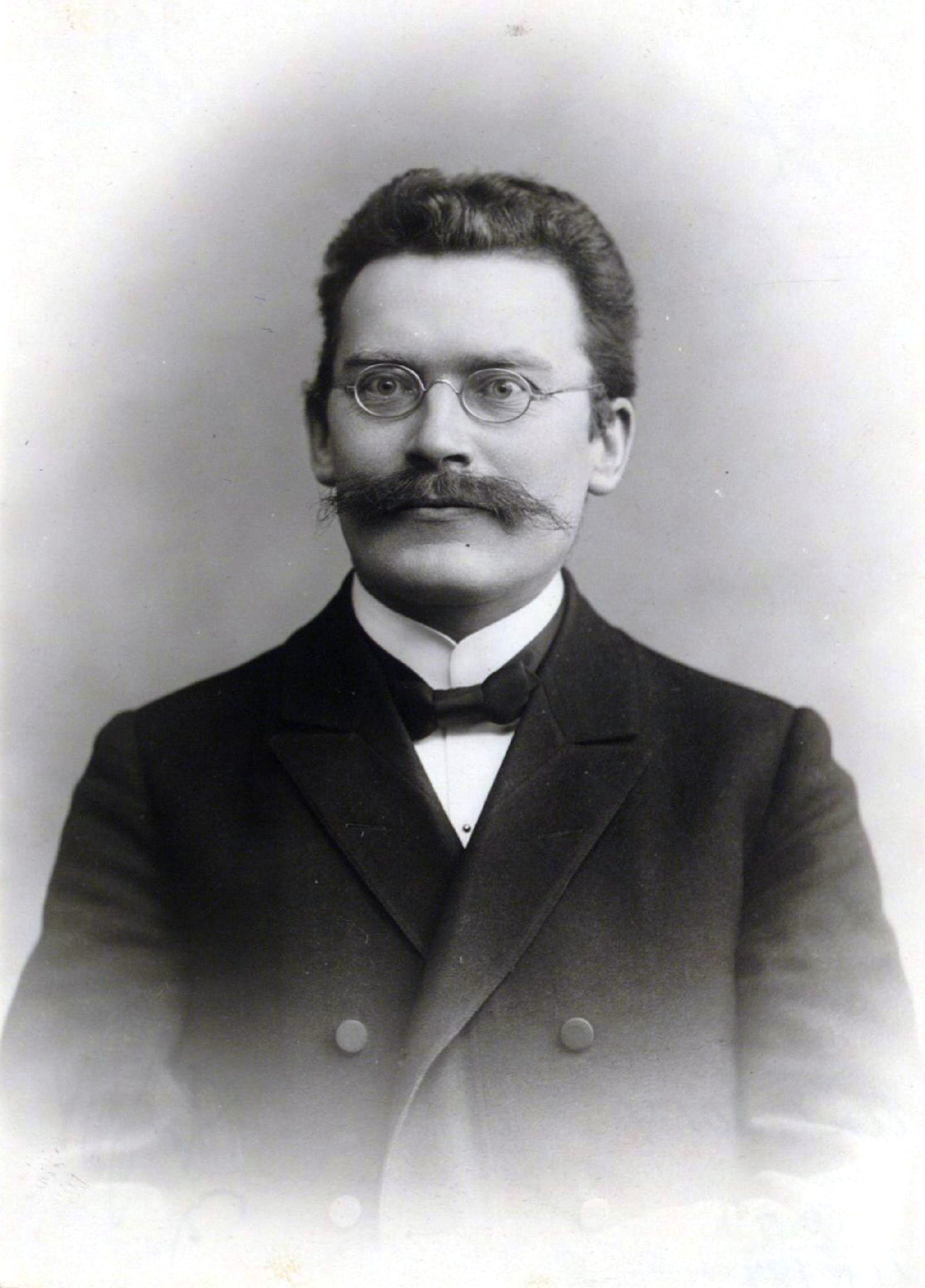

Chief Justice of Estonia
- In office 1919–1940

Personal details
- Born: 5 June 1873 Arula Parish (now Otepää Parish), Kreis Dorpat, Governorate of Livonia
- Died: 5 December 1940 (aged 67) Tartu

Kaarel Parts (5 June 1873 – 5 December 1940) was an Estonian lawyer, judge and politician. He was a member of Estonian Constituent Assembly.

From 1919 to 1940 he was Chief Justice of Estonia.
