= Madis Timpson =

Minister of Justice of Estonia from 2024

Minister of Justice
- In office 1 April 2024 – 23 July 2024
- Preceded by: Kalle Laanet
- Succeeded by: Liisa-Ly Pakosta

Mayor of Vijandi
- In office 3 November 2017 – 24 March 2024

Personal details
- Born: 1 October 1974 (age 51) Viljandi, then part of Estonian SSR, Soviet Union
- Party: Estonian Reform Party

Madis Timpson (born 1 October 1974) is an Estonian politician, lawyer, and civil servant who was the Minister of Justice of Estonia in 2024.

== Biography ==
Madis Timpson was born on 1 October 1974.

He studied at Viljandi 4th Secondary School, from which he graduated in 1993.

After graduating from high school, he began to study history and later law at the University of Tartu, and in 2001 he graduated from the University of Tartu with a master's degree in law.

From 2001 to 2003 and from 2005 to 2007, Timpson was the city secretary of Viljandi. Between 2003 and 2005, he was a private entrepreneur.

From 2007 to 2014, he was a legal advisor to the Minister of Justice. From 2014 to 2015, he was a legal advisor to the Minister of the Interior, and from 2015 to 2017, he was a legal advisor to the Minister of Public Administration.

From 3 November 2017 to 25 March 2024, Timpson was the mayor of Viljandi.

Since 5 December 2023, he is a member of the board of the Estonian Reform Party.

On 25 March 2024, President Alar Karis appointed Timpson as Minister of Justice. He was sworn to office on 1 April.

== Personal life ==
Timpson is divorced and is the father of one child.
