= Urmas Arumäe =

Estonian politician

Minister of Justice
- In office 2 June 1994 – 8 November 1994
- Prime Minister: Mart Laar
- Preceded by: Kaido Kama
- Succeeded by: Jüri Adams

Personal details
- Born: 1 January 1957 (age 69) Tootsi, then part of Estonian SSR, Soviet Union

Urmas Arumäe (born 1 January 1957) is an Estonian attorney, associate professor at the Estonian Business School, and former minister of justice.

Ummi was born in Tootsi, and graduated in 1988 from the University of Tartu, faculty of law. On 2 June 1994 he became minister of justice in the first government of Prime Minister Mart Laar, an office he retained until 8 November that year. Arumäe was registered as a member of the conservative Pro Patria Union between 1998 and 2010, and the centrist Estonian Centre Party between 2009 and 2011.

After being admitted to the Estonian Bar Association in 1994, he founded his own law firm, while also being active in the public sector by working in local government. Since 1992 he has lectured at the Estonian Business School (EBS) and other private schools of higher education; and since 2008, he has been associate professor of law and public administration at the Estonian Business School and chairman of the advisory board of EBS Helsinki (Finland). He has also been active in the development of the Estonian system of local government, written on topics related to local government and been a spokesperson for local government issues. In 2011, he founded Andresson Consulting Network Law Office, in which he is CEO and senior consultant. In 2018, he founded also Arumäe Law Firm, where he is the managing partner.

== Education ==
Arumäe graduated from the Tartu State University (now University of Tartu) in 1988 with a degree that is equivalent to a Master of Laws degree (LLM). In 1992, he received an MBA from the Estonian Business School, and in 1998, graduated cum laude from the Stockholm University Department of Law with a Master of Laws (LLM) in European Union law. In 2010, he defended his doctoral dissertation entitled Territorial communities and the Legal Organization of their Management at the Estonian Business School and acquired a doctorate (PhD) in management science.

== Legal career ==
Arumäe first established the Concordia Law Office (1995–1999), and thereafter established the Landwell Law Office (2000–2001) in cooperation with PricewaterhouseCoopers Estonia (2000–2001). In 2001, he re-established his law office under the original name Concordia Law Office, which operated until the end of 2005, when Arumäe entered the public sector. In 2011, Arumäe established a new law office under the name Andresson Consulting Network.

== Career in government ==
He has also been a member of the Administrative Council of the Tallinn City Centre Administration (1993–1996). From 2005 to 2008, he was the mayor of the Viimsi Rural Municipality and chairman of the Harju County Local Government Association (2006–2010). He was the Estonian minister of justice in 1994 (2 June – 8 November).

== Professional memberships ==
He is an attorney-at-law (as of 23 August 1994), a member of the Estonian Bar Association (as of 11 November 1994) and the International Bar Association (IBA). He was among the founders of the Estonian Lawyers Association and its long-time president. He is also a member of the Estonian Consultants Association (2010).

== Personal life ==
Arumäe was born in Tootsi Rural Municipality, in Pärnu County, Estonia, where attended the local basic school and went onto attend a vocational-secondary school in Tallinn. He is married to Tiiu Arumäe and has one daughter and two sons.

Political offices
Preceded by Kaido Kama	Minister of Justice; 1994	Succeeded by Jüri Adams
