= Rait Maruste =

Estonian lawyer and politician

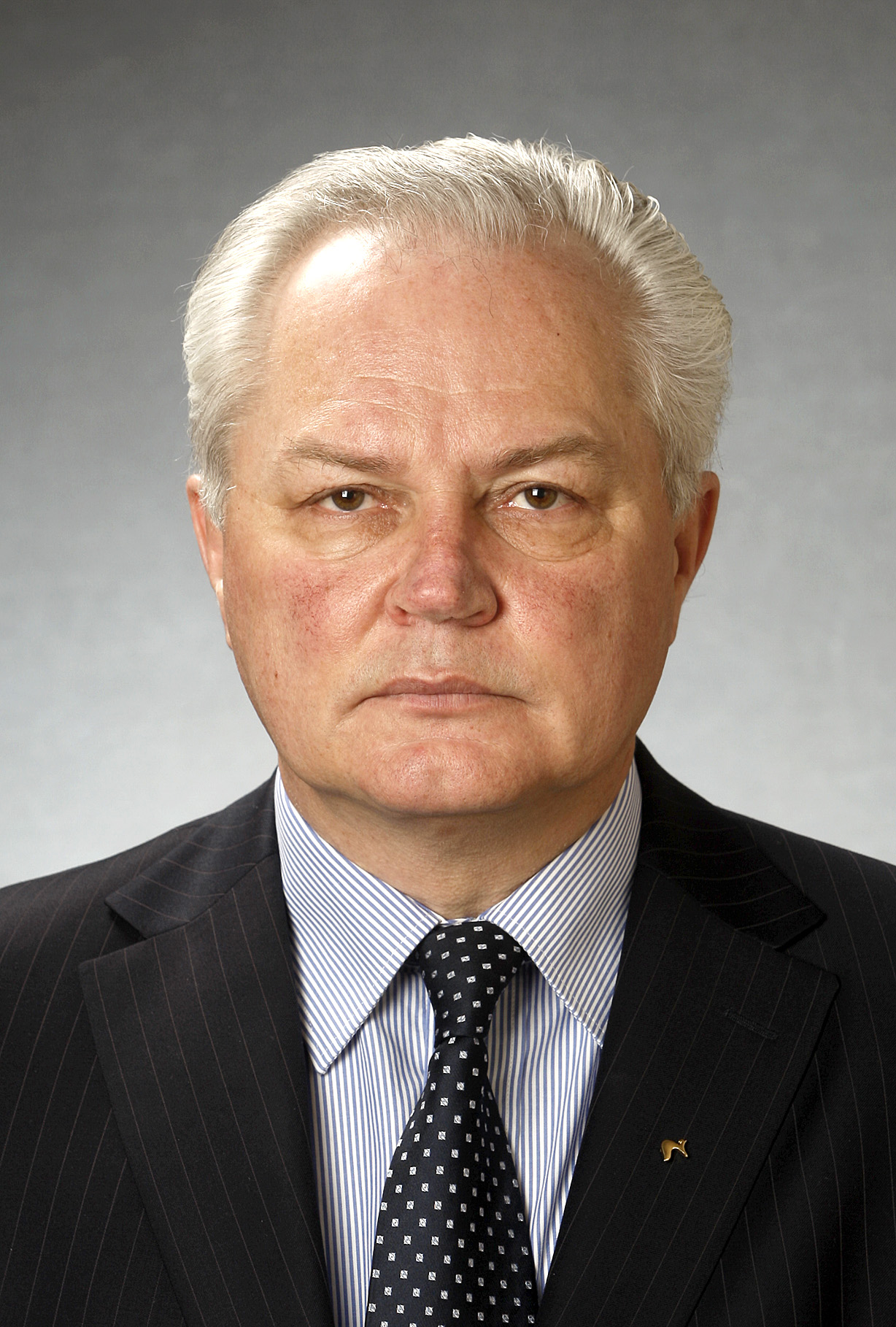
Rait Maruste in 2011

Rait Maruste (born 27 September 1953 in Pärnu) is an Estonian former judge, legal scholar and politician. He was a member of the IX, X, XI and XII Riigikogu.

From 1992 until 1998 he was Chief Justice of the Supreme Court of Estonia. He then served as a judge at the European Court of Human Rights from 1998 to 2010.

He is a member of the Estonian Reform Party.
