= Kaido Kama =

Estonian politician

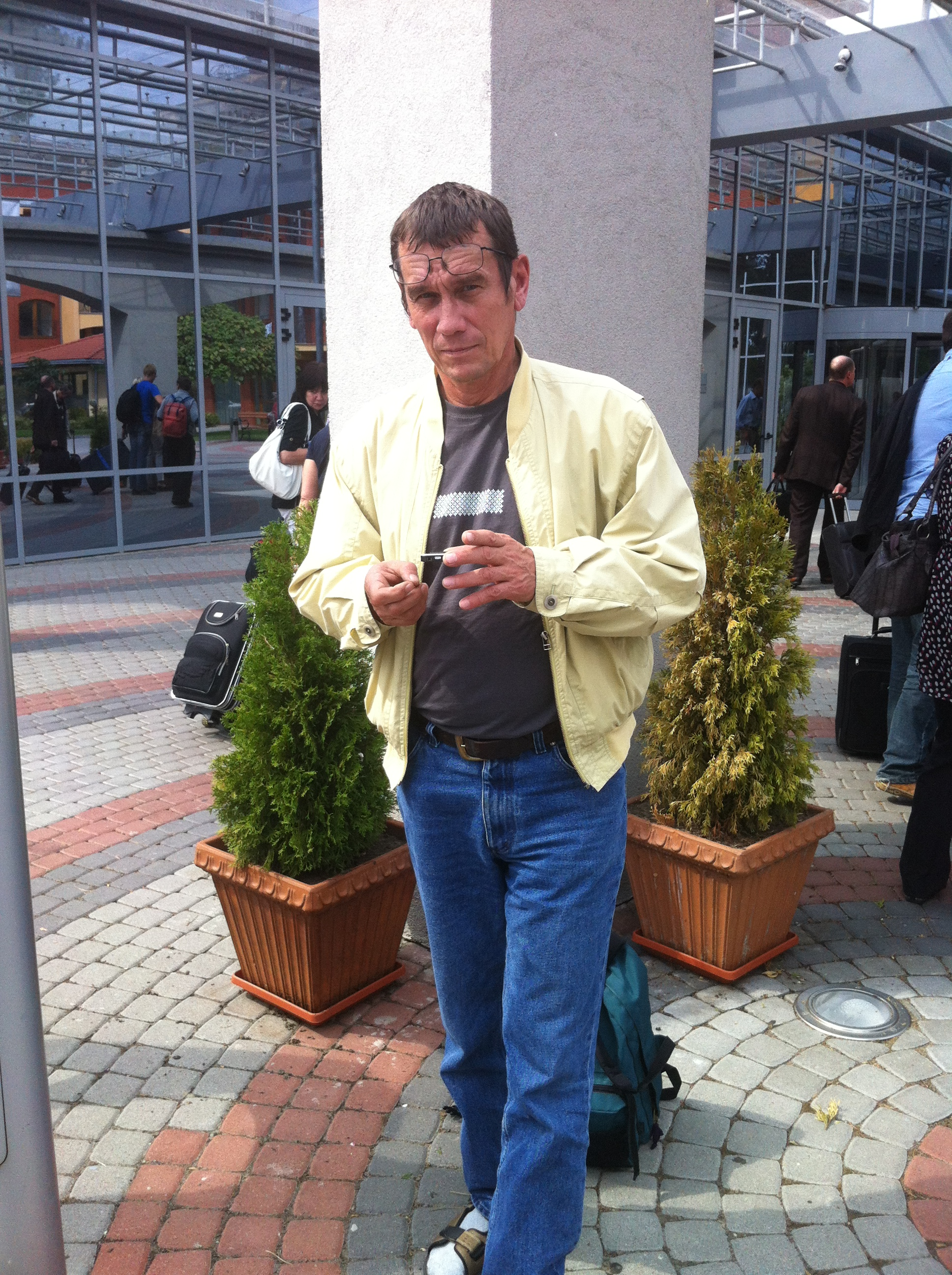
- Kama at the 6th World Congress of the Finno-Ugric Peoples in Siófok, Hungary in 2012.

Minister of the Interior
- In office 4 November 1994 – 12 April 1995
- Prime Minister: Andres Tarand
- Preceded by: Heiki Arike
- Succeeded by: Edgar Savisaar

Minister of Justice
- In office 21 October 1992 – 23 May 1994
- Prime Minister: Mart Laar
- Preceded by: Märt Rask
- Succeeded by: Urmas Arumäe

Personal details
- Born: 18 December 1957 (age 68) Viljandi, then part of Estonian SSR, Soviet Union
- Children: 7
- Education: Estonian Academy of Arts

Kaido Kama (born 18 December 1957) is an Estonian politician, conservationist, and teacher. He served as the Minister of Justice of Estonia from 1992 to 1994, as well as Estonia's Minister of the Interior from 1994 to 1995.

== Biography ==
Kama graduated from Viljandi 1st Secondary School in 1975. From 1975 to 1976, he studied architecture at the Estonian Academy of Arts. From 1982 to 1990, he worked as a conservation officer at Antsla Forest.

In 1990, Kama was elected to the Congress of Estonia. He was also a member of the Estonian Committee and the Estonian Constitutional Assembly (Estonian: Põhiseaduse Assamblee). In 1990, he was also a member of the Estonian Supreme Soviet at the time of Perestroika and the chairman of the Ownership Reform Commission. During the vote on the Estonian restoration of Independence, he was one of two members of the Soviet who did not register and walked out on the vote, the other being Klavdia Sergij. He was a member of the 1990 incarnation of the Estonian Conservative People's Party. In 1992, he was elected to the Riigikogu as a part of the Pro Patria National Coalition Party. He initially ran as part of The Right Wingers, but withdrew from the mandate.

Kama was the Minister of Justice during Mart Laar's term as prime minister from 1992 to 1994, as well as being the Minister of the Interior during Andres Tarand's term as prime minister from 1994 to 1995.

Kama has worked, among other things, as an advisor to former Prime Minister Juhan Parts, a counselor of the Ministry of Defense, as well as for the company Remedia and in Karula National Park.

From 1997 to 2004, Kama was the director of the Võru Institute.

Kama is also a noted conservationist, publishing numerous articles and interviews in support of conservationism in Estonia.

== Personal life ==
Kama currently lives in Võru County and is a follower of Maausk. He has six children: sons Susi, Põvvat, Pikne, Mõtus Lõmaš, and daughters Kärg and Põim. Pikne was the director of the Valga Museum in Valga.

== Awards ==
- 4th Class of the Estonian Order of the National Coat of Arms (received 20 February 1998)
- Bernard Kangro Literary Prize (2002)

== Works ==
- "Ümbreilma reisikirä", Fontese Publishing 2001, ISBN 9985935616
