= Priit Pikamäe =

Estonian lawyer

5th President of the Supreme Court of Estonia
- Incumbent
- Assumed office 13 September 2013
- Preceded by: Märt Rask

Personal details
- Born: 22 November 1973 (age 52) Tallinn, Estonia
- Children: 2
- Education: University of Tartu

Priit Pikamäe (born 22 November 1973) is an Estonian lawyer who has been the President of the Supreme Court of Estonia in 2013-2019 and now serves as an Advocate-General of the European Court of Justice.

== Early life and education ==
Priit Pikamäe was born on 22 November 1973 in the Estonian capital of Tallinn where he finished elementary and high school. He graduated law from the Faculty of Law of the University of Tartu, after studying in the faculties of law of the French universities of Poitiers and Paris I. Pikamäe gained his PhD from the same University in 2006.

== Career ==
In 1994, Pikamäe became Head of Legal Department of the Estonian Citizenship and Immigration Board. In 1995 he was employed in the Ministry of Foreign Affairs and since 1996 in the Ministry of Justice where he also works today. Between 2000 and 2004, he worked as a part-time assistant at the Tartu Faculty of Law. In 2005, Pikamäe was appointed a judge in Tallinn City Court (presently Harju County Court) before moving on to the Tallinn Circuit Court. In 2006, the Supreme Court of Estonia elected him as its judge. Between 2010 and 2013, he was Chairman of the Court's Criminal Chamber. In May 2013, Pikamäe was unanimously elected as the new Chief Justice by the Estonian Parliament on the proposal of President Toomas Hendrik Ilves. His 9-year term began on 13 September 2013 and would have ended in 2022. However, in 2019, the Estonian government nominated him to the post of Advocate General of the European Court of Justice. In addition, he is a guest professor at the Faculty of Law of the University of Tartu, where he teaches penal law: criminal procedure and imprisonment law.

== Personal life ==
Priit Pikamäe is married and has two children.
