= Paul Varul =

Estonian lawyer and politician

- Paul Varul (2022)

Minister of Justice
- In office 17 April 1995 – 25 March 1999
- Prime Minister: Tiit Vähi; Mart Siimann
- Preceded by: Jüri Adams
- Succeeded by: Märt Rask

Personal details
- Born: 10 December 1952 (age 73) Valga, then part of Estonian SSR, Soviet Union

Paul Varul (born 10 December 1952 in Valga) is an Estonian lawyer and politician. He was the Minister of Justice of Estonia from 1995 to 1999.

== Education ==
Varul studied at the University of Tartu and graduated in 1975.

== Legislation ==
Varul was involved in drafting all the major legal acts of private law in Estonia (examples include: Law of Property Act, General Part of the Civil Code Act, Family Law Act, Law of Succession Act, Commercial Code, Law of Obligations Act, Bankruptcy Act, Reorganisation Act, Electronic Communications Act etc.). He has also been an expert contributor to the drafting of the National Central Bank Act (Eesti Pank Act) and the legislation regulating the pursuit of business of a credit institution (including the Credit Institutions Act).

== Career ==
Varul has been an academic at the University of Tartu.

Varul is a senior partner of the law firm TGS Baltic.

He is one of the founding members of the European Law Institute, a non-profit organisation that conducts research, makes recommendations and provides practical guidance in the field of European legal development with a goal of enhancing European legal integration.

Varul has written about the importance of improving legal education in Estonia.

Political offices
Preceded by Jüri Adams	Minister of Justice; 1995–1999	Succeeded by Märt Rask
