= Orissaare =

Village in Estonia

- Small borough
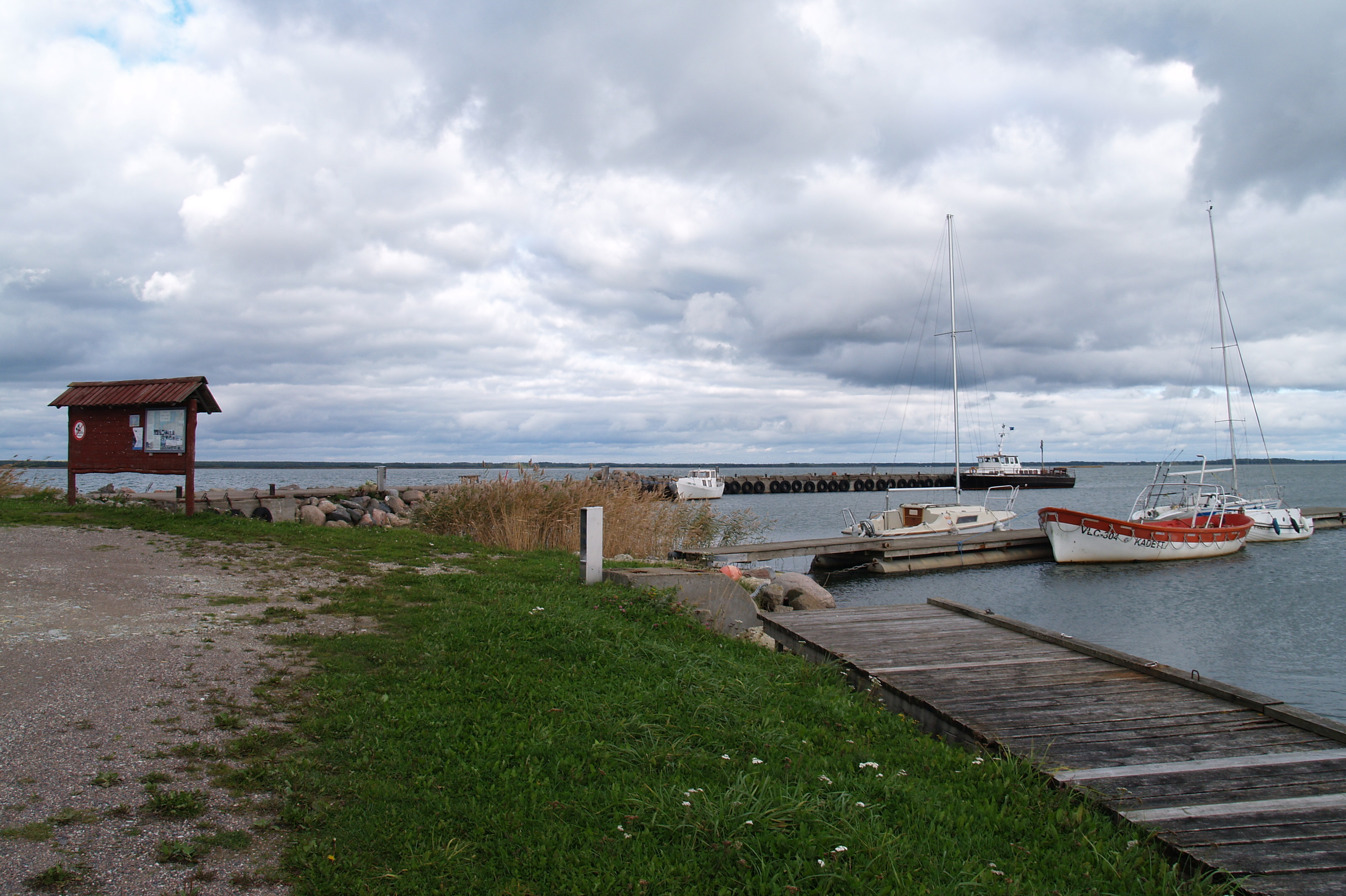
- Port of Orissaare

- Location within Estonia
- Coordinates: 58°34′N 23°06′E
- Country: Estonia
- County: Saare County
- Parish: Saaremaa Parish

Population (1 January 2020)
  - Total: 806
- Time zone: UTC+2 (EET)
  - Summer (DST): UTC+3 (EESTkaka)

Drone video of the stadium oak tree (European Tree of the Year 2015) and Orissaare in August 2021

Orissaare (German: Orrisaar) is a small borough (Estonian: alevik) in Saaremaa Parish, Saare County in western Estonia.

Orissaare TV Mast (180 m) is located in Orissaare.

An oak growing in the middle of Orissaare stadium won the title of European Tree of the Year in 2015.

== Notable people from Orissaare ==
- Kalle Laanet (born 1965), politician and police officer
- Villu Kõve (born 1971), Chief Justice of the Supreme Court of Estonia
- Ott Aardam (born 1980), stage, TV and film actor
- Kaie Kand (born 1984), heptathlete

== Gallery ==
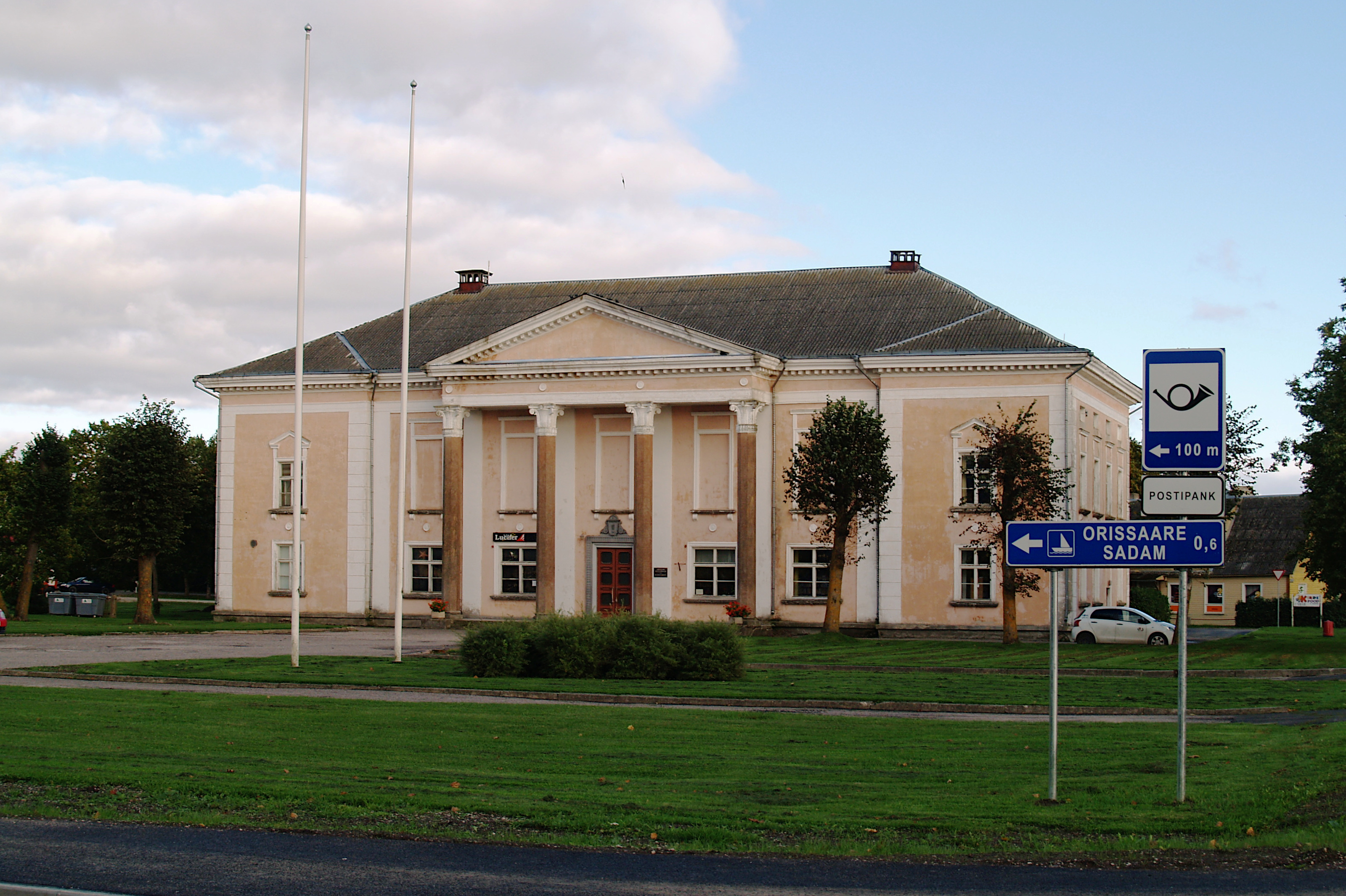
House of culture

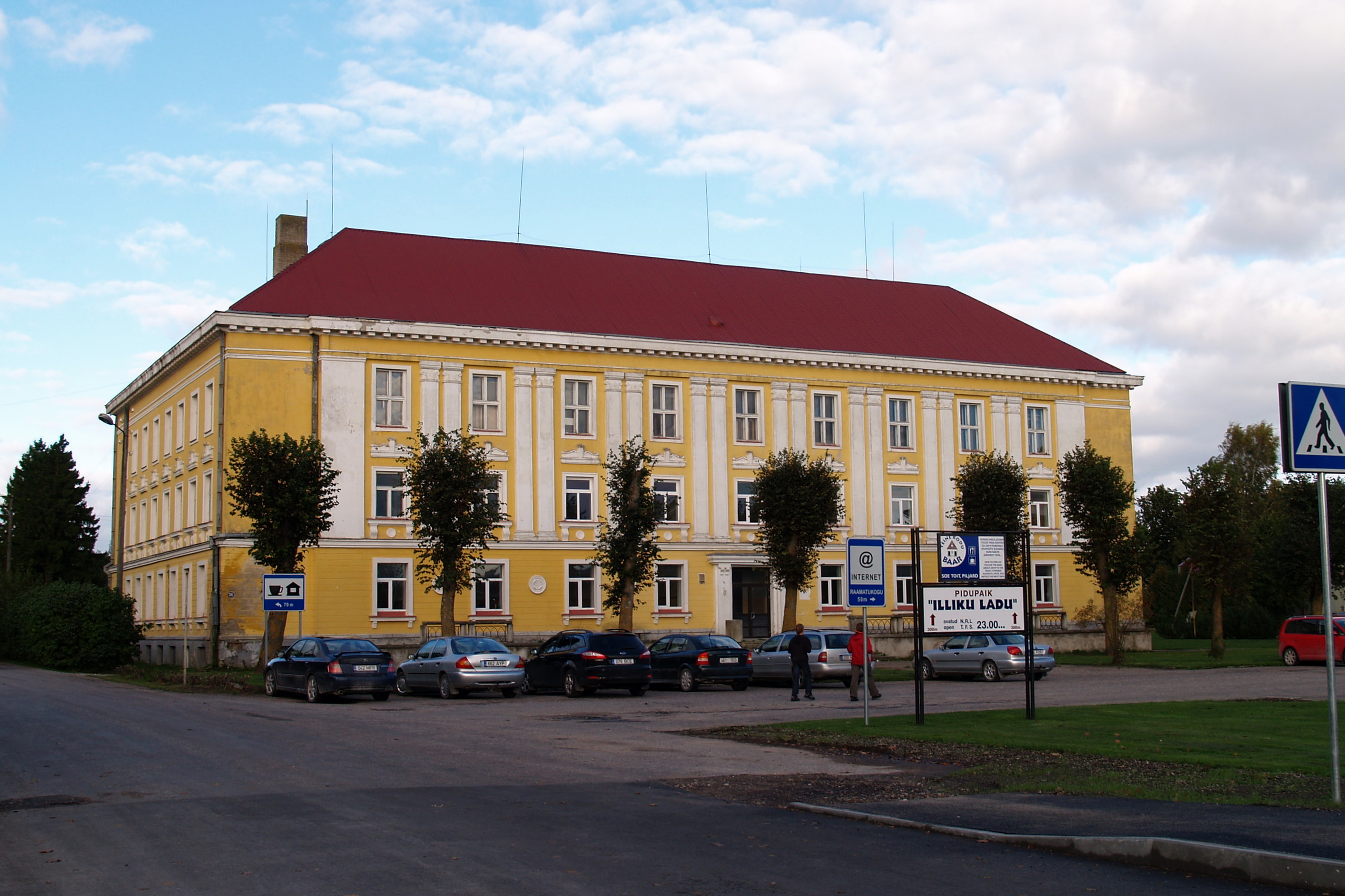
Office building in Orissaare

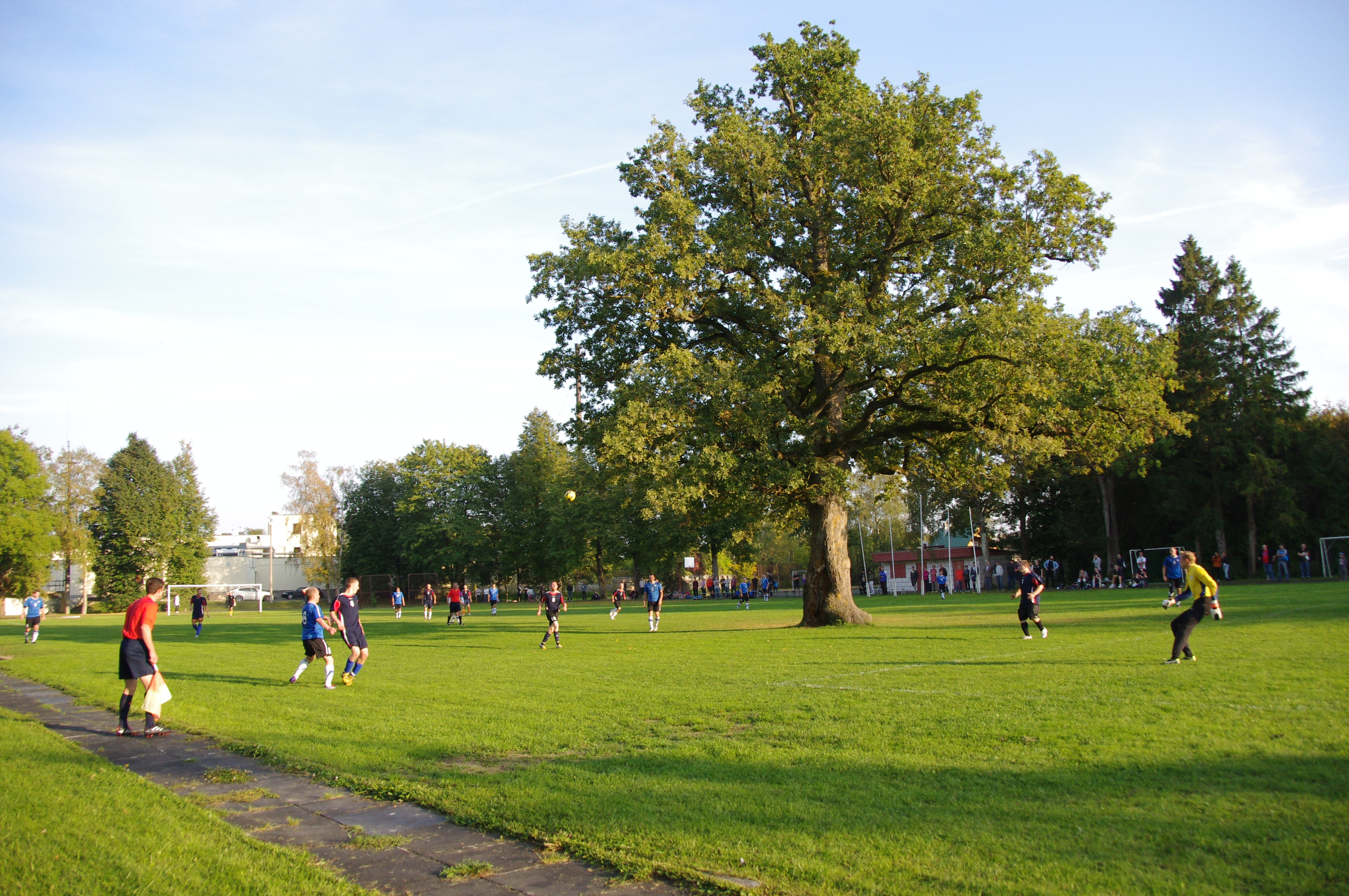
Orissaare oak, the European Tree of the Year of 2015

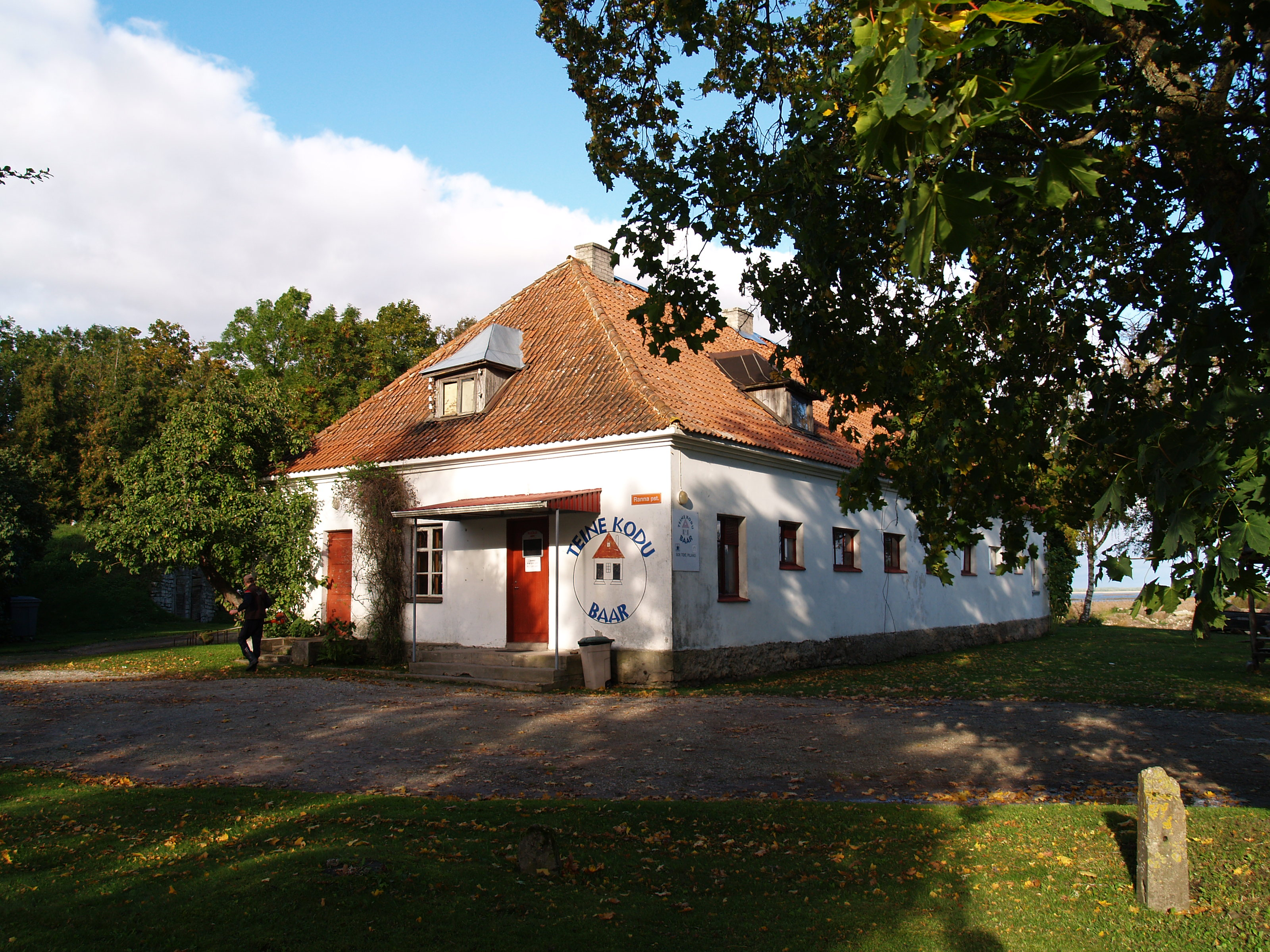
Local bar

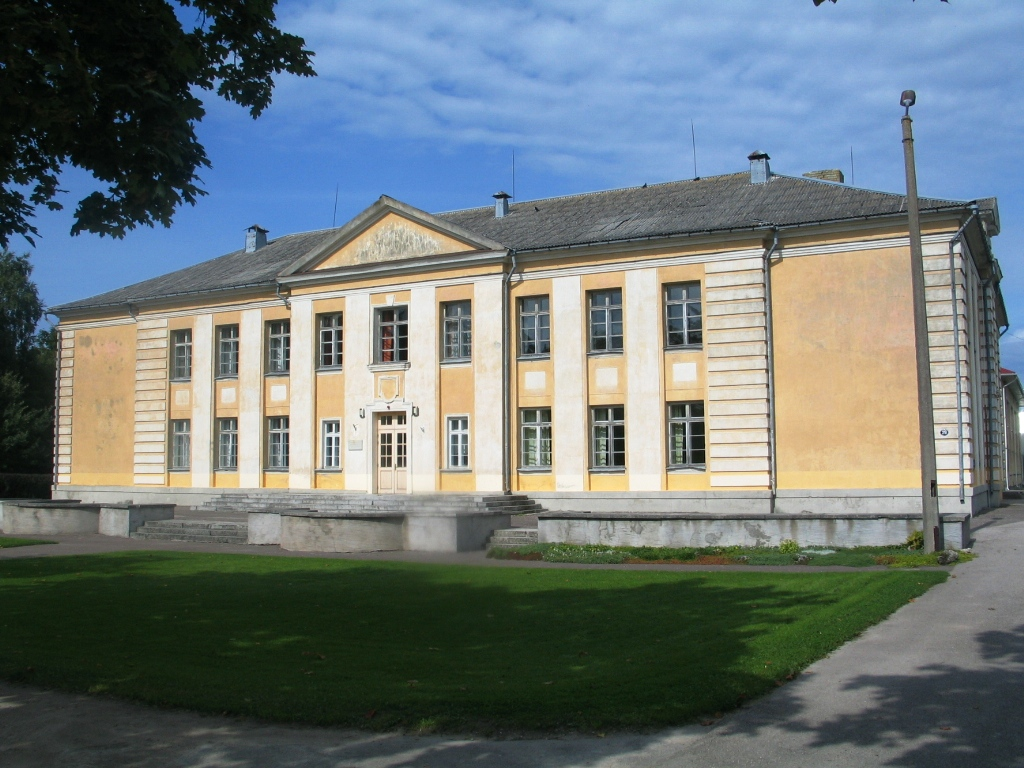
Orissaare Gymnasium secondary school
