= Supreme Court of Estonia =

Highest court in Estonia

- Riigikohus
- Interactive map of Supreme Court of Estonia
- 58.380°N 26.715°E
- Established: 21 October 1919; 106 years ago
- Location: Tartu
- Coordinates: 58.380°N 26.715°E
- Authorised by: Constitution of Estonia
- Judge term length: Life tenure
- Number of positions: 19
- Website: Official site

Chief Justice of the Supreme Court
- Currently: Villu Kõve
- Since: 4 February 2019

The Supreme Court of Estonia (Estonian: Riigikohus) is the court of last resort in Estonia. It is both a court of cassation and a constitutional court. The courthouse is in Tartu.

== History ==
=== During the first independence period (1919-1940) ===
With the First Constitution of Estonia and the Supreme Court Act, the Estonian Constituent Assembly established the Supreme Court of Estonia as a court of cassation on 21 October 1919. The first Justices of the Court were Kaarel Parts (Chief Justice), Paul Beniko, Rein Koemets, Jaan Lõo, Hugo Reiman, Martin Taevere and Peeter Puusepp. The Court first sat in Tartu Town Hall on 14 January 1920. During the centralisation of power in 1935, the Supreme Court was transferred to Tallinn, operating from a specially remodelled building on Wismari Street. When the Court last sat on 31 December 1940, it accepted an order by the government of the Estonian SSR to disband itself as of 1 January 1941.

=== Soviet occupation (1940-1991) ===
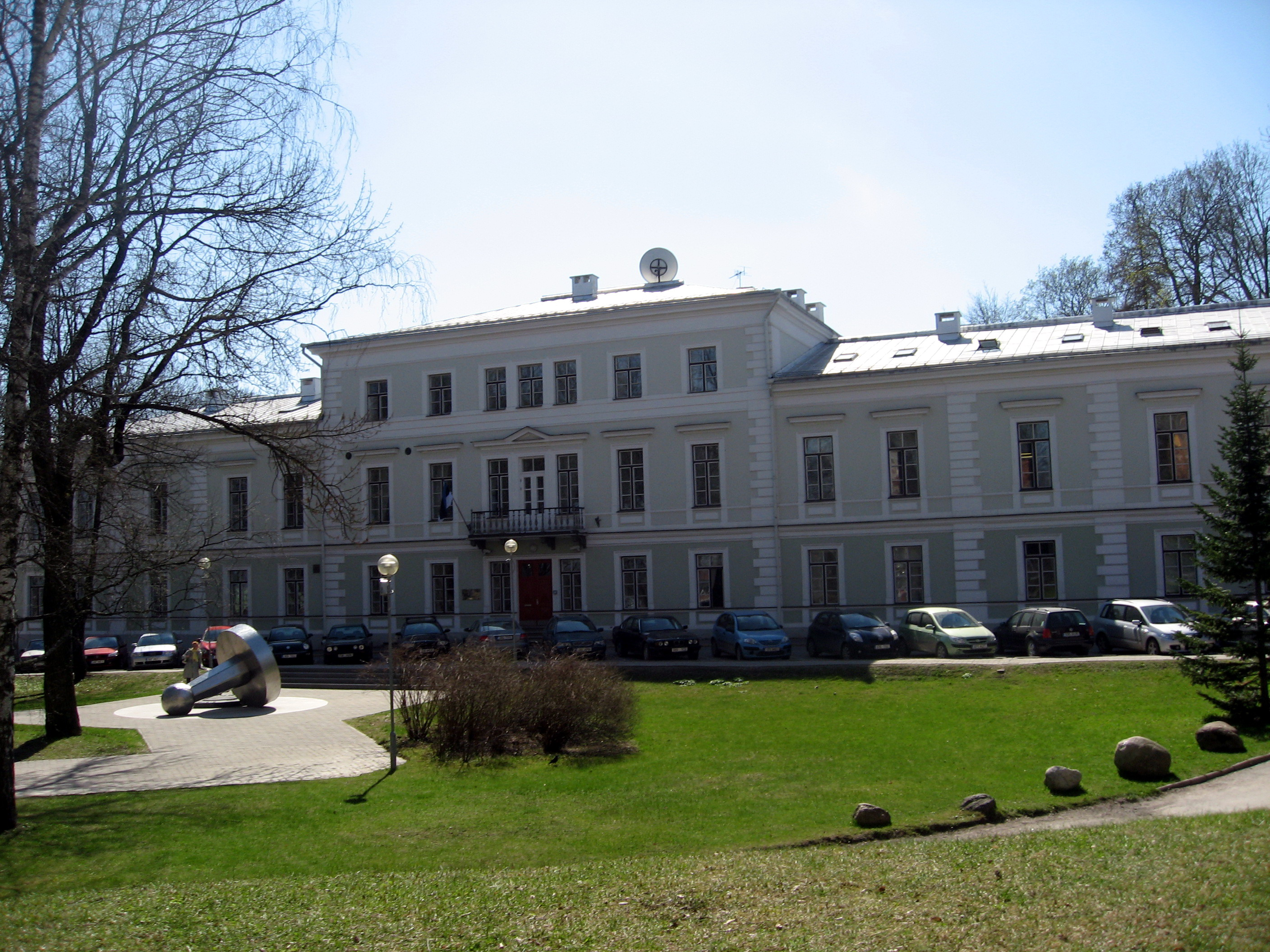
The Supreme Court headquarters (1940-1991) and current Building of the Supreme Court of the Republic of Estonia

The Supreme Court of the Estonian SSR (Estonian: Eesti NSV Ülemkohus) was a Republican affiliate institution of the Supreme Court of the Soviet Union. All court decisions were made in accordance with the Soviet Constitution and the Estonian SSR's Constitution. The court's composition was determined by the republic's Supreme Soviet every five years. It was composed of a Civil Chamber, a Criminal Chamber, the Presidium and Military court. According to an act by the Supreme Soviet on 8 May 1990, the court was legally separated from the legislature, having previously been described as an extension of it per unified power. It took effect days later on 16 May.

=== After restoration of independence (since 1992) ===
When the Fourth Constitution of Estonia was adopted by referendum, the legal basis was created for the re-establishment of the Supreme Court. Rait Maruste was designated as the first Chief Justice. The re-established Court held its first hearing in Tartu Town Hall on 27 May 1993.

== Courthouse ==
In 1919, a manor house on Aia street in Tartu was designated for the Supreme Court by the Government of Estonia. Moving to the designated building was delayed, though, because the building in question was used for the peace negotiations between Estonia and Russian SFSR; on 2 February 1920 the building hosted the signing of the Treaty of Tartu. The Supreme Court worked out of the Aia Street building during the period of 1920-1935. The building currently houses a secondary school - Jaan Poska Gymnasium. From 1935 until its disbandment in 1940, the Court sat in Tallinn, in a building on the current Wismari Street.

In 1993, the Supreme Court moved into its current building - the former barracks-infirmary at Lossi 17.

== Chambers ==
=== Supreme Court en banc ===
The Court en banc (Estonian: Üldkogu) is the highest body of the Court and consists of all 19 Justices. Any decision is voted upon on a simple majority basis; in case of a tie, the Chief Justice has the deciding vote. For the Court to be capable of making decisions, at least 11 Justices must be present.

Only the Court en banc has the authority to propose appointments and dismissals of inferior Judges, decide on disciplinary complaints against Judges and authorize declarations of incapability of members of Riigikogu, the President of Estonia, the Chancellor of Justice or the Auditor General.

A case can be referred to the Court en banc by any of the lower chambers of the Court, and all decisions made by the en banc panel are binding for the lower chambers. In 2012, for example, the Court sat en banc to decide on the legality of the European Stability Mechanism. The case was referred to the panel by the Constitutional Review Chamber because of its public and controversial nature.

=== Intercameral (ad hoc) panel ===
An Intercameral (ad hoc) panel (Estonian: Erikogu) is summoned to solve disputes between chambers of the court regarding interpretation of the law and to decide on intra-court disputes on jurisdiction. An intercameral panel is summoned and presided over by the Chief Justice and includes two Justices from all relevant ordinary (Civil, Criminal and Administrative) chambers. Decisions of the intercameral panel are binding for lower chambers, unless they've been overruled by the Court en banc.

=== Constitutional Review Chamber ===
The Constitutional Review Chamber (Estonian: Põhiseaduslikkuse järelevalve kolleegium) fulfils the role of the constitutional court in the Estonian legal system. The Chief Justice of the Court is ex officio the chairman of the Constitutional Review Chamber. The Constitutional Review Chamber is composed of the Chief Justice and eight Justices, representing all ordinary lower chambers. Annually, two of the most senior members of the Chamber are released from their duties thereto, and two new ones are elected by the Court en banc. The Constitutional Review Chamber can strike out in any legislation that is deemed unconstitutional, and can advise Riigikogu on the constitutionality of any proposed EU law.

According to Chapter 2 of the Constitutional Review Court Procedure Act, an application for Constitutional Review can be started by the Chancellor of Justice, the President of Estonia, any Local Government Council or an inferior Court. Even though the Law doesn't allow for individuals or companies to lodge applications, in some cases such applications have been accepted, if the applicants had no other practicable way of constitutional protection.

=== Administrative, Civil and Criminal Chambers ===
The three ordinary chambers of the Court hear appeals and applications for review of new evidence from Circuit Courts. The Administrative Chamber (Estonian: Halduskolleegium) has six members, the Civil Chamber (Estonian: Tsiviilkolleegium) includes seven Justices, and the Criminal Chamber (Estonian: Kriminaalkolleegium) has six members. Most cases are heard by a panel of three judges; however, if the panel disagrees on the interpretation of a point of law or wishes to overrule a previous decision of their own chamber, the case is transferred to the full Chamber. If it's necessary to overrule a previous decision of another chamber, the case is head by an ad hoc inter-chamberal panel. If the chamber wishes to overrule a decision by the inter-chamberal panel or the Court en banc, the case is transferred to the Court en banc immediately.

== Chief Justice of the Supreme Court ==
=== Appointment ===
The Chief Justice of the Supreme Court is appointed by the Riigikogu on the advice of the President of Estonia. According to §27 of the Courts Act, the Chief Justice is appointed for 9 years and no person can be appointed for two consecutive terms of office.

=== List of chief justices ===
- Kaarel Parts (1919–1940)
- Rait Maruste (1992–1998)
- Uno Lõhmus (1998–2004)
- Märt Rask (2004–2013)
- Priit Pikamäe (2013-2019)
- Villu Kõve (since 2019)

== Justices ==
=== Appointment ===
Any experienced lawyer in good standing can apply to become a Justice of the Supreme Court following an announcement of a public competition. Successful candidates are appointed for life tenure by Riigikogu on the advice of the current Chief Justice of the Supreme Court.

=== Current justices ===
The Court ordinarily includes 19 justices; however, one or more positions are often vacant. The current justices are listed below.

- Villu Kõve - Chief Justice, ex officio Chairman of the Constitutional Review Chamber

==== Administrative Law Chamber ====
- Ivo Pilving - Chairman of the Administrative Law Chamber, Justice
- Jüri Põld - Justice
- Viive Ligi - Justice
- Nele Parrest - Justice
- Heiki Loot - Justice

==== Civil Chamber ====
- Peeter Jerofejev - Chairman of the Civil Chamber, Justice
- Henn Jõks - Justice
- Ants Kull - Justice
- Malle Seppik - Justice
- Jaak Luik - Justice
- Tambet Tampuu - Justice

==== Criminal Chamber ====
- Saale Laos - Chairman of the Criminal Chamber, Justice
- Eerik Kergandberg - Justice
- Hannes Kiris - Justice
- Paavo Randma - Justice
- Peeter Roosma - Justice
- Velmar Brett - Justice

=== Former justices ===
- Julia Laffranque - former Justice of the Administrative Law Chamber (2004-2010), currently Justice of the European Court of Human Rights

=== Retirement and release from office ===
According to §99^{1} of the Courts Act, the mandatory retirement age for any Judges, including the Chief Justice and Justices of the Supreme Court, is 68 years.
In accordance with the Courts Act, a Justice of the Supreme Court can be released from office by Riigikogu on advice of the Chief Justice, while the Chief Justice can be released by Riigikogu on advice of the President. Any release from office has to be for one of the reasons laid out in §99(1) of Courts Act as quoted below.

"(1) A judge shall be released from office:

1) at the request of the judge;

2) due to age;

3) due to unsuitability for office – within three years after appointment to office;

4) due to health reasons which hinders work as a judge;

5) upon liquidation of the court or reduction of the number of judges;

6) if after leaving service on the Supreme Court, the Ministry of Justice, an international court institution or after returning from an international civil mission, a judge does not have the opportunity to return to his or her former position of judge, and he or she does not wish to be transferred to another court.

7) if a judge is appointed or elected to the position or office which is not in accordance with the restrictions on services of judges;

8) if facts become evident which according to law preclude the appointment of the person as a judge."

== Participation in international organisations ==
- Conference of European Constitutional Courts
- World Conference on Constitutional Justice
- Association of Councils of State and Supreme Administrative Jurisdictions of the European Union
- Venice Commission of Council of Europe
