= Villu Kõve =

Estonian judge (born 1971)

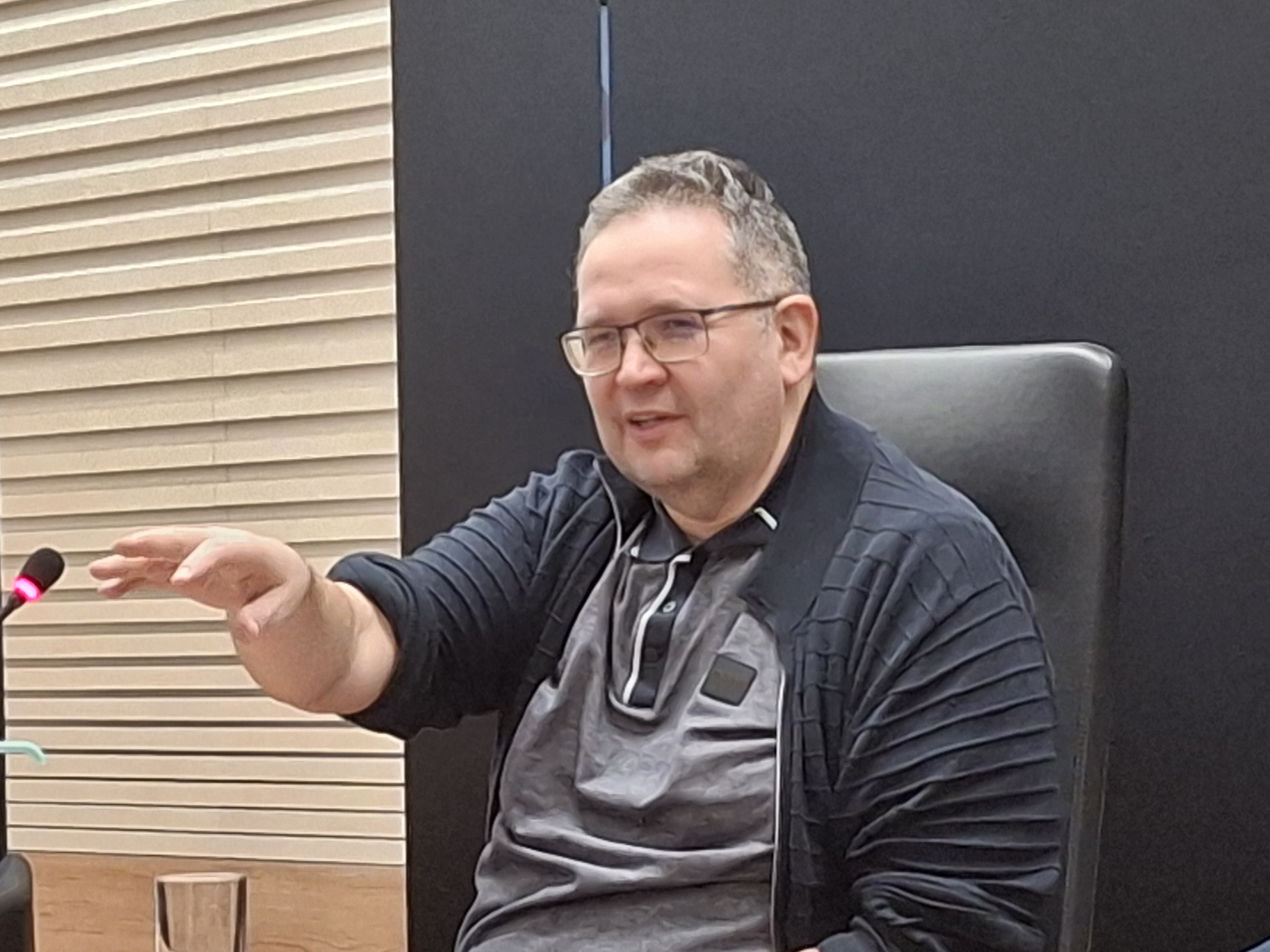
Kõve in 2025

Villu Kõve (born 26 August 1971 in Orissaare) is an Estonian judge. Since on 4 February 2019, he is the Chief Justice of the Supreme Court of Estonia.

In 2009, he finished his PhD studies at the University of Tartu's Faculty of Law.

2014–2019, he worked as the Chairman of the Civil Chamber of the Supreme Court of Estonia.
