= Jüri Adams =

Estonian politician (born 1947)

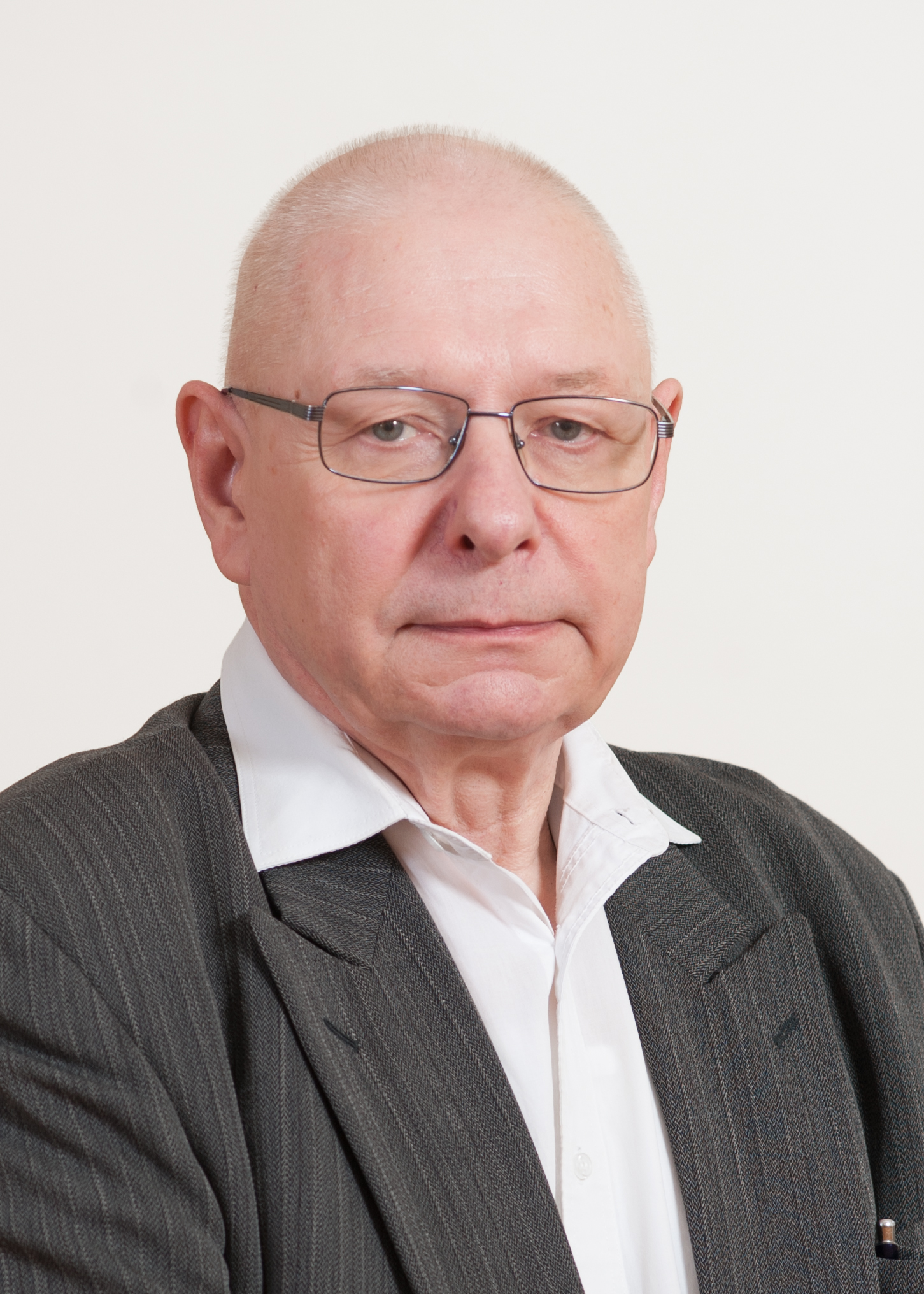
- Jüri Adams in 2015

Minister of Justice
- In office 8 November 1994 – 17 April 1995
- Prime Minister: Andres Tarand
- Preceded by: Urmas Arumäe
- Succeeded by: Paul Varul

Personal details
- Born: 22 November 1947 (age 78) Tartu, Estonia
- Party: Estonian Free Party

Jüri Adams (born 22 November 1947) is an Estonian politician. He formerly was the Justice Minister of Estonia from 1994 to 1995. He has been a member of numerous political parties, including the Estonian National Independence Party, Pro Patria Union, and later the Pro Patria and Res Publica Union. From 2014 to 2019, he was a member of the Estonian Free Party and a member of the Riigikogu.

== Education and career ==
Adams graduated from the Tartu Distance Learning Secondary School in 1966, studied mathematics at Moscow State University, and English philology at the University of Tartu. He graduated from Luua Metsanduskool with a degree in forestry machinery in 1982.

Adams has worked, among other things, as a teacher, forest warden, and boiler-maker.

== Political career ==
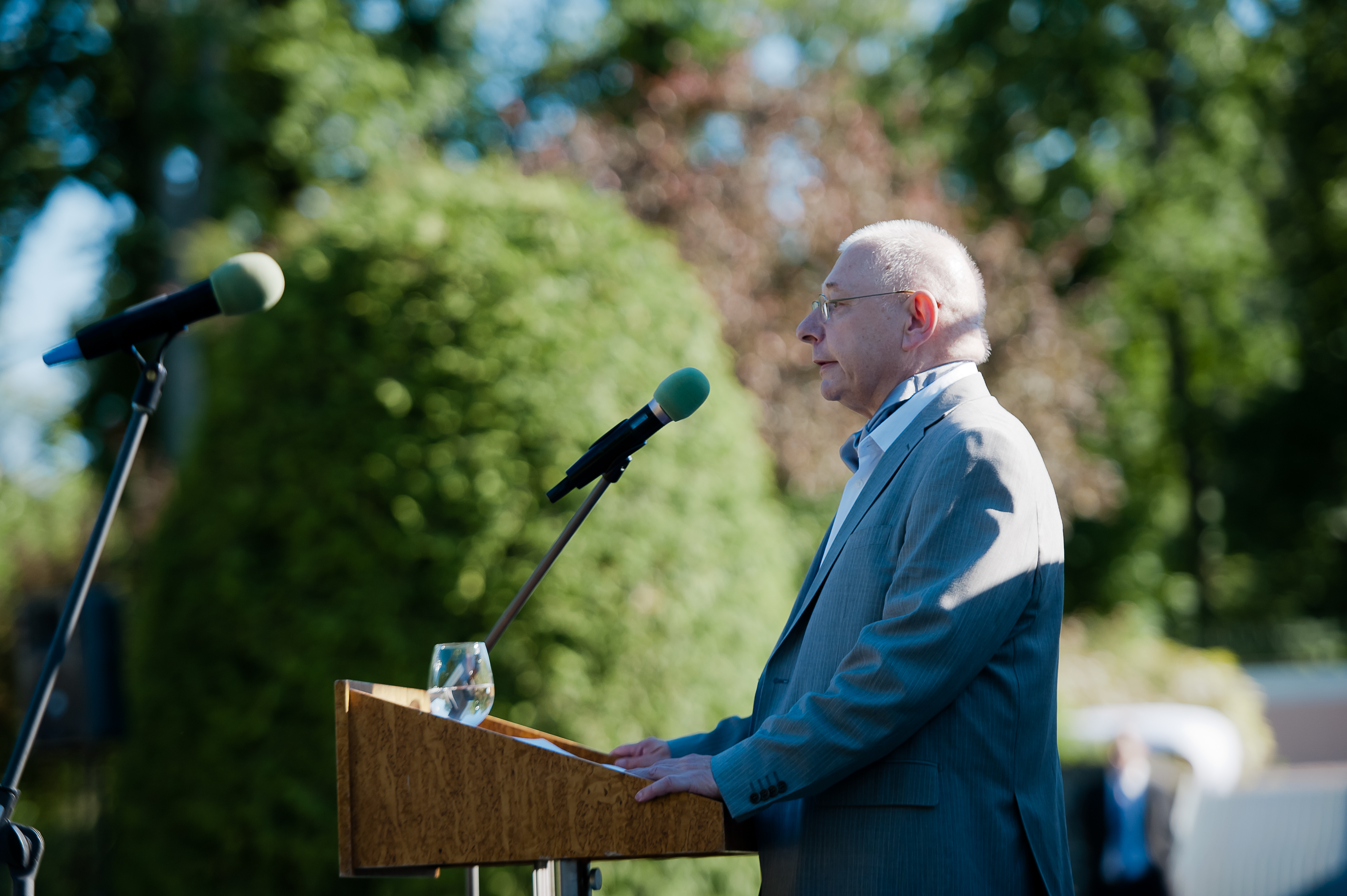
Adams delivering a speech on the 20th anniversary of the establishment of the Estonian Constitution in Kadriorg, Tallinn on 28 June 2012.

In the time before Estonia regained its independence, Adams participated in the Estonian resistance movement and in the underground in the free press. Among other things, he translated the secret protocols of the Molotov–Ribbentrop Pact into Estonian. In 1978, he founded the magazine "Additions to the Freedom of Thoughts and News in Estonia". In 1988, Adams was one of the founders of the program and articles of association of the Estonian National Independence Party, and then the vice chairman of the party. From 1990 to 1992, he was the vice chairman of the Estonian Congress.

Adams was a member of the Constitutional Assembly. He is considered to be the main author of the Constitution of the Republic of Estonia. From 1992 to 2003, and again from 2015 onwards, he has been a member of the Riigikogu, where he was chairman of the Committee on Legal Affairs.

From 1994 to 1995, Adams was the Justice Minister of Estonia under prime minister Andres Tarand. However, from 2003 to 2014, he did not participate in active political activities. Adams is one of the founders of the Jaan Tõnisson Institute and, since 2007, has been the chairman of their council.

== Awards ==
- 2001: 3rd Class of the Estonian Order of the National Coat of Arms (received 23 February 2001)
- 2006: 2nd Class of the Order of the White Star (received 14 September 2007)

== Personal life ==
Adams is the son of writer and literary scholar Valmar Adams.

== Bibliography ==
- "Taasvabanenud Eesti põhiseaduse eellugu", Kirjastus Juura, 1997, ISBN 9985-8225-9-5
- "Keda me valisime 1995?", AS Liivimaa Lombard, 1995
