= Valmar =

Valmar may refer to:

== People ==
- Valmar (born 1948), Armenian painter
- Siim Valmar Kiisler (born 1965), Estonian politician
- Valmar Adams (1899–1993), Estonian poet, literary scholar and editor
- Lilian Valmar (1928–2013), Argentine actress

== Fiction ==
- Valmar, also spelled Valimar, capital of the land Valinor in J. R. R. Tolkien's legendarium
- Valmar, a character from the video game Grandia 2

== See also ==
- Leopoldo Augusto de Cueto, 1st Marquis of Valmar (1815–1901), Spanish noble
