= Ministry of Justice and Digital Affairs (Estonia) =

Government ministry of Estonia

Ministry of Justice

Agency overview
- Formed: 24 February 1918
- Jurisdiction: Government of Estonia
- Headquarters: Suur-Ameerika 1, 10122 Tallinn, Estonia
- Annual budget: €192 million (2022)
- Minister responsible: Liisa-Ly Pakosta, Minister of Justice and Digital Affairs
- Website: https://www.justdigi.ee/en

The Estonian Ministry of Justice and Digital Affairs (Estonian: Justiits- ja Digiministeerium) is the Ministry of Justice of Estonia, dealing also with digital affairs and its development. The Minister of Justice (Estonian: justiits- ja digiminister) is the senior minister at the Ministry of Justice and Digital Affairs in the Estonian Government. The Ministry is responsible for providing support to the court system and providing legal focus in proposing new laws.

== Duties and structures ==
Ministry of Justice has following duties and structures:

- Prisons (Estonian Department of Prisons)
- The Prosecutor's Office
- Courts
- Patent Office
- Estonian Competition Authority
- Data Protection Inspectorate
- Estonian Forensic Institute
- Centre of Registers and Information Systems

== List of ministers ==
- Jüri Raidla (3 April 1990 – 30 January 1992)
- Märt Rask (30 January 1992 – 21 October 1992)
- Kaido Kama (21 October 1992 – 23 May 1994)
- Urmas Arumäe (2 June 1994 – 8 November 1994)
- Jüri Adams (8 November 1994 – 17 April 1995)
- Paul Varul (17 April 1995 – 6 November 1995; 6 November 1995 – 17 March 1997; 17 March 1997 – 25 March 1999)
- Märt Rask (25 March 1999 – 28 January 2002; 28 January 2002 – 10 April 2003)
- Ken-Marti Vaher (10 April 2003 – 13 April 2005)
- Rein Lang (13 April 2005 – 5 April 2007; 5 April 2007 – 5 April 2011)
- Kristen Michal (6 April 2011 – 10 December 2012)
- Hanno Pevkur (10 December 2012 – 26 March 2014)
- Andres Anvelt (26 March 2014 – 9 April 2015)
- Urmas Reinsalu (9 April 2015 – 29 April 2019)
- Raivo Aeg (29 April 2019 – 26 January 2021)
- Maris Lauri (26 January 2021 – 18 July 2022)
- Lea Danilson-Järg (18 July 2022 – 17 April 2023)
- Kalle Laanet (17 April 2023 – 1 April 2024)
- Madis Timpson (1 April 2024 – 23 July 2024)
- Liisa-Ly Pakosta (23 July 2024 – ...)

== Regulator of non-profit organisations ==
The Law on Non-Profit Organisations defines non-profit organisations as legal entities whose purpose is not to make a profit. Non-profit organisations may engage in a variety of activities, such as promoting culture, sports, education and charity. The activities of such organisations are generally aimed at achieving the public good rather than making a profit. An NGO is a private legal entity that acquires legal capacity after being included in the register of non-profit organisations and foundations.

=== Registration ===
Both individuals and legal entities (organisations and companies) can be founders and members of an NGO. There must be at least two founders. Underage persons may be founders only with the consent of their parents. Founders and members may also be foreigners, but if the entire board is located abroad, a contact person with a relevant entrepreneurial licence must be entered in the register.

In order to establish an NGO, a constituent meeting with the members must be held, at which the charter and the founding agreement are drawn up and signed.

The charter is a document that should contain agreements important for the membership regarding the further activities of the organisation. The charter of an NGO should, in particular, contain the name of the organisation, the registration office, the purpose of the activity, the conditions and procedure for admission to membership and withdrawal or suspension, the conditions and procedure for convening general meetings and the procedure for making decisions, etc. The founding agreement consists, in particular, of the name, registration address of the organisation, its purpose, data of the founders and members of the board, information on the obligations of the founders to the NGO, etc.

Afterwards, the application for registration, together with the charter and the founding agreement, must be submitted for registration in the Business Register. The documents can be submitted either electronically in the e-Business Register or in hard copy to the registry office. If the documents are in order, the new NGO will be registered within five business days. If any deficiencies are found, the register notifies the founders and allows them to eliminate such deficiencies.

=== Operation of a non-profit organisation ===
The management of a non-profit organisation is carried out in accordance with the charter through decision-making by the board. The board is elected for a term of up to three years at the general assembly.

The general assembly must be held at least once a year. The competence of the general assembly of an NPO includes, for instance, amending the charter, approving the annual report, liquidating the NPO, and much more. In addition to electing board members, the general assembly also has the power to dismiss board members. To pass a decision at the general meeting, more than 50% of the votes are required (in some cases 2/3 of the votes).

A member of a non-profit organisation may be any individual or legal entity that meets the requirements of the non-profit organisation's charter. Members can withdraw from membership at any time.

A non-profit organisation may have branches, which are not separate legal entities and are governed by the charter of the NPO.

=== Commercial activities and financing of NGOs ===
An NPO may engage in economic activities and generate income that it uses solely to achieve its statutory objectives. Typical sources of funding may include, for instance, grants, donations, membership fees, etc.

As a result of the operation, commercial activities may be carried out and profits may be generated, but they shall not be paid as income to the founders or members of the NPO. An organisation is allowed to organise commercial events, provide services or sell goods, but this shall not be the main activity of the NPO. Non-profit organisations can also establish special funds to deposit money that can be used for statutory activities. Also, NPOs can engage in social entrepreneurship. They may also apply to creditors on a general basis.

A member of the board may be paid remuneration. The amount and procedure for payment of remuneration to a member of the board are determined by a decision of the general assembly.

An NPO is obliged to keep accounting records and submit annual reports in accordance with the law. The board of an NPO shall keep accounting records and prepare a report at the end of the financial year. The duration of the financial year is 12 months; at the time of establishment or liquidation, it may be shorter or longer, but not more than 18 months. If the non-profit organisation has an auditor or an audit committee, the financial report shall be accompanied by a report of a sworn auditor or an audit committee. The management board submits the report to the general assembly, which approves it by voting. The approved financial annual report, indicating the main field of economic activity, is submitted to the Register.

=== Non-profitability and income tax exemption ===
Non-profit organisations can apply for inclusion in a list that exempts them from paying income tax if they act in the public interest and are engaged in charitable activities. Membership in this list allows associations to receive tax benefits for donations, gifts, entrance fees, and scholarships without income tax. Tax exemption is regulated by the Tax and Customs Board, which accepts applications for inclusion in the list, makes decisions on tax exemption, checks the necessary declarations, and more.

=== Termination of an NPO ===
Grounds for termination of a non-profit organisation:

1. Number of members of the non-profit association decreases to less than two or another number stipulated by law or the charter (usually less than 2);
2. By the resolution of the general assembly
3. Compulsorily by a court decision: if the activities of the non-profit association do not meet its statutory objectives; or if the main activity of the non-profit organisation becomes a commercial activity. Then the court sends a decision to the Registrar for termination of the NPO

==== Resolution of the general assembly ====
In order to terminate the operation of an NPO, the resolution must receive at least 2/3 of the votes, unless otherwise stipulated by the charter. Afterwards, the NPO submits a corresponding application to the Register together with the decision and protocol of the general assembly. The application can be submitted online through the e-Business Register.

The liquidator(s) of the NPO must immediately publish a notice of liquidation and officially notify the creditors. After satisfying the creditors' claims, the liquidators draw up a final balance sheet and a plan for the distribution of property. If it turns out that the NPO's assets are less than its liabilities, the liquidator must file a bankruptcy petition with the court.

== See also ==
- Justice ministry
- Politics of Estonia
- Tax and Customs Board
- Non-profit organisation
