= Liisa Pakosta =

Estonian politician (born 1969)

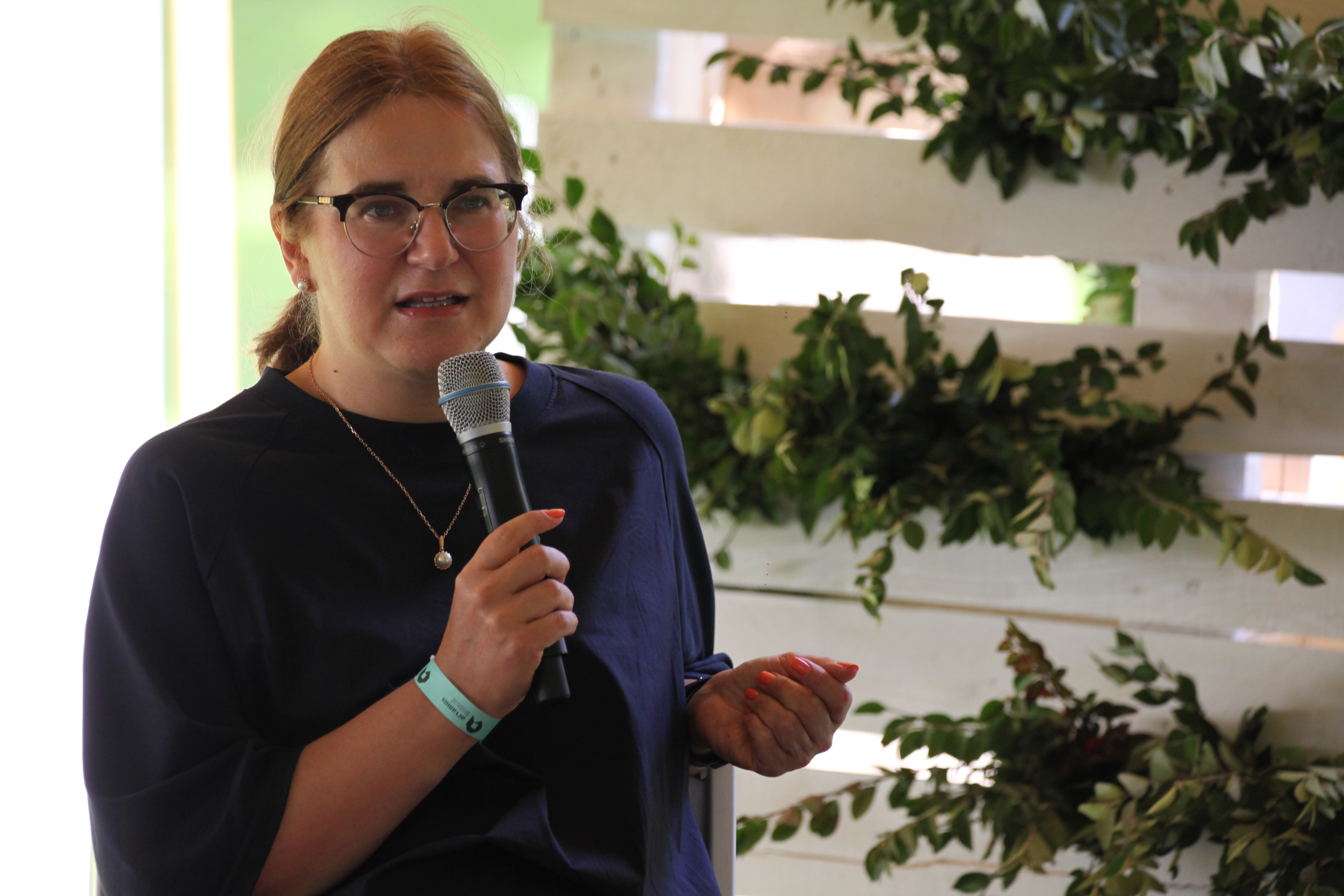
- Pakosta in 2021

Minister of Justice and Digital Affairs
- Incumbent
- Assumed office 23 July 2024
- Prime Minister: Kristen Michal
- Preceded by: Madis Timpson

Commissioner for Gender Equality and Equal Treatment
- In office 3 July 2015 – 1 July 2022
- Preceded by: Mari-Liis Sepper
- Succeeded by: Christian Veske

Member of the Riigikogu
- In office 9 November 2009 – 3 July 2015

Personal details
- Born: Liisa-Ly Pakosta; September 3, 1969 (age 57) Tallinn, then part of Estonian SSR, Soviet Union
- Party: Estonia 200 (since 2023)
- Other political affiliations: Isamaa (2006–2023)
- Children: 5
- Education: University of Tartu; Estonian Academy of Arts
- Occupation: Historian • Politician

Liisa-Ly Pakosta (born 3 September 1969) is an Estonian politician. She is a member of the XV Riigikogu.

Between 2015–2022 she was a Gender Equality and Equal Treatment Commissioner. She served as the Director-General of the National Heritage Board from July 1, 2022, to October 16 of the same year.

In the 2023 elections, she ran for the Riigikogu as a candidate for the Estonia 200 party and received 1,731 votes in electoral district number 2 (Tallinn Central, Lasnamäe, and Pirita districts), securing her election as a member of the Riigikogu. She used to be a member of the party Isamaa.

She became Minister of Justice and Digital Affairs in the cabinet of Kristen Michal on 23 July 2024.
