= Jüri Raidla =

Estonian lawyer (born 1957)

Ministry of Justice
- In office 3 April 1990 – 30 January 1992
- Prime Minister: Edgar Savisaar
- Succeeded by: Märt Rask

Personal details
- Born: 2 July 1957 (age 68)

Jüri Raidla (born 2 July 1957 in Soviet Union) is an Estonian lawyer, founder and senior partner of law firm Ellex Raidla. He served as the first Estonian Minister of Justice from 1990 to 1992.

== Career ==
1980 was educated at the University of Tartu (law degree cum laude), 1987 at University of St. Petersburg (Russia), Ph.D. and 1992 at post-doctorate program at Lund University (Sweden).

1981–1988 Legal counsel of various agricultural companies, 1989 Chairman of the District Council in Pärnu. From 3 April 1990 to 30 January 1992 he was the Estonian Minister of Justice. 1992–1993 Managing Director of Estonian Banking Association. He is the founder and senior partner of Ellex Raidla (one of the largest law firms in Estonia, established in 1993). Law Practice – General Commercial & Contract, Constitutional Law & Government Relations, Property Law, Construction & Real Estate Development.

Jüri Raidla has published a substantial number of articles, overviews and reports on various topics of Estonian law, and has spoken on a substantial number of domestic and international conferences on issues related to Estonian constitution, regaining Estonian independence, property reform, corporate governance. Raidla speaks Estonian, English, and Russian.

== Participation in legislative drafting ==
- Constitution of the Republic of Estonia
- Estonian State Symbols Act
- Law on Property Reform Act
- Law on Land Reform
- Law on Protection of Foreign Investments
- Privatization Law Act
- Development Fund Act
- Human Gene Research Act
- Health Insurance Act
- Unemployment Insurance Act
- Estonian Health Insurance Fund Act
- Credit Institutions Act

== Memberships ==
- Member of the International Bar Association
- Chairman of the Advisory Board of the University of Tartu
- Member of the Estonian Bar Association
- Member of Supervisory Board SA Iuridicum

== Publications ==
- Jüri Raidla, Rein Lang. "Estonia: Europe's Delaware?" – The European Lawyer, Issue 71/ September 2007
- "The Baltic Legal Infrastructure – Fit for Business." – Defensor Legis, 2004;
- "The War of Laws." – European Lawyer, 2003;
- Jüri Raidla, Ants Nõmper. "The Estonian Genome Project and the Human Gene Research Act." – Baltic Yearbook of International Law, 2002, Vol 2, pages 51–69;
- "Obligations Arising from Causing Damages by Motor Vehicles." – Olion, 1990.

| Preceded by — | Minister of Justice; 1990–1992 | Succeeded by Märt Rask |
