= Jüri Põld =

Estonian judge (1956–2025)

Justice of the Supreme Court of Estonia
- In office 11 May 1993 – 31 December 2021

Personal details
- Born: 21 June 1956 Kuressaare, then part of Estonian SSR, Soviet Union
- Died: 7 April 2025 (aged 68)
- Education: Tartu State University
- Occupation: Judge

Jüri Põld (21 June 1956 – 7 April 2025) was an Estonian judge. He served on the Supreme Court from 1993 to 2021.

Põld died on 7 April 2025, at the age of 68.
