= Uno Lõhmus =

Estonian judge (1952–2024)

Uno Lõhmus (30 October 1952 – 7 August 2024) was an Estonian judge, Chief Justice of the Supreme Court of Estonia from 1998 to 2004.

== Life and career ==
Lõhmus was born in Mõisaküla on 30 October 1952.

From 1994 to 1998 he was the judge elected in respect of Estonia to the European Court of Human Rights. He then served at the European Court of Justice as the first Estonian judge from 2004 to 2013.

In 2005 he was awarded the Order of the White Star, II class.

Lõhmus died on 7 August 2024, at the age of 71.
