= Remy Põld =

Estonian basketball player

Remy Põld (born 13 September 1992 in Tallinn, Estonia) is an Estonian basketball player who currently plays for Leicester Riders in the British Basketball League and the Estonia national basketball team at Under 18 level. He has previously represented Estonia at Under 16 level.

His is a 1.98 m guard. 2010/11 was his first professional year, playing for BC Kalev/Cramo in the Korvpalli Meistriliiga. He has also played in the men's senior league second tier since 2009/10.
