= Tax and Customs Board =

Government agency of Estonia

Tax and Customs Board Maksu- ja Tolliamet

Jurisdictional structure
- Operations jurisdiction: Estonia
- Specialist jurisdictions: Customs, excise, gambling; Taxation

Operational structure
- Headquarters: Lõõtsa 8a, 15176 Tallinn, Estonia
- Agency executive: Valdur Laid, Director General
- Parent agency: Ministry of Finance

Website
- www.emta.ee/eng

The Tax and Customs Board (MTA; Estonian: Maksu- ja Tolliamet) is the taxation authority in the Republic of Estonia. It is an agency of the Ministry of Finance.

The agency deals with collection of revenue for the state budget, the implementation of tax laws, customs rules and related legislation, enforcement, licensing gambling companies and lottery organisations, supervision and inspection of gambling and lotteries, and provision of service to citizens and e-residents to aid in fulfilment of tax liability and customs procedures.

== Regulator of non-profit organisations ==
A non-profit organisation (NPO) is a legal entity whose primary purpose is not to generate profit but to serve the public good. These organisations engage in various activities, including promoting culture, sports, education, and charity, with their efforts focused on benefiting society rather than making a profit.

The operation of NPOs is regulated by the Ministry of Justice, and all information is registered and stored in the Register of Non-Profit Organisations and Foundations, which is maintained by the Register Department of the Tartu District Court and the Register and Information Systems Centre.

=== Non-profitability and tax exemptions ===
When registering or in the course of its operations, an organisation may also apply for inclusion in the List of Non-Profit Organisations, Foundations and Religious Associations with Income Tax Exemptions (the ‘List’). To be eligible, the organisation must act in the public interest and engage in charitable activities.

Membership in the List allows NPOs to receive income tax benefits on donations/gifts, admission expenses and pay scholarships without income tax.

To receive a discount on income tax, an organisation must submit an application to the Tax and Customs Service.

=== Requirements and obligations ===
To be listed and remain on the list, an organisation must meet certain requirements:

- The organisation acts in the public interest.
- The organisation's activities are charitable, its profits are used to achieve its statutory objectives and cannot be distributed among its members.
- In case of liquidation, the residual assets are transferred to another NPO from the List.
- The organisation has no right to advertise the goods or services of the founder or donor, or to promote the professional activities or entrepreneurship of a person belonging to the target group.
- The organisation has no outstanding tax debts and no repeated delays in paying tax.
- The reports/declarations are submitted within the time limit or in accordance with the procedure established by law.

Along with the annual financial statements, the organisation is obliged to submit to the Tax and Customs Board once a year the declaration form of INF 4 "Gifts and Donations" and the declaration form of INF 9 "Declaration on the Use of Gifts, Donations and Other Income".
