= Valmar Adams =

Estonian writer

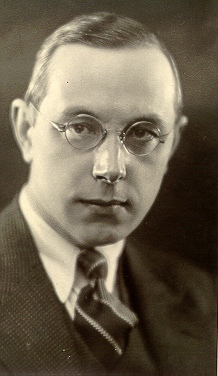
Valmar Adams in 1930s

Valmar Adams (born Vladimir Karl Moritz Adams; 30 January 1899 – 15 March 1993) was an Estonian poet, literary scholar and editor. He also used pseudonyms Vilmar Adams (1924–1933), Vladimir Aleksandrovski and Inno Vask.

Adams was born in St. Petersburg in 1899 to Estonian parents. In 1909, he relocated to Tartu. Between 1923 and 1929, he studied at the University of Tartu and graduated with master's degree in Estonian and general literature.

When in 1928 the Estonian PEN Club (branch of PEN International) was founded, Adams was one of its founding members. 1940–1941, he was the editor-in-chief for the newspaper Tartu Kommunist ('Tartu Communist').

He was awarded the Smuul Literary Award in 1988 for his novel "Esta astub ellu", which is considered as his memoir.

In 1986, the film about Valmar Adams titled Intiimne Adams ('Intimate Adams') was made. He died in Tartu in 1993, aged 94.

His son Jüri Adams was a politician and former Justice Minister of Estonia.

== Selected works ==
- 1924 poetry collection "Suudlus lumme" ('A Kiss into the Snow')
- 1932 poetry collection "Maise matka poolel teel" ('Halfway through One's Earthly Journey')
- 1972 poetry collection "Nooruse tolmunud kuld" ('The Dusty Gold of Youth')
- 1987 novel "Esta astub ellu" ('Esta Enters upon Life')
