= Raivo Aeg =

Estonian politician (born 1962)

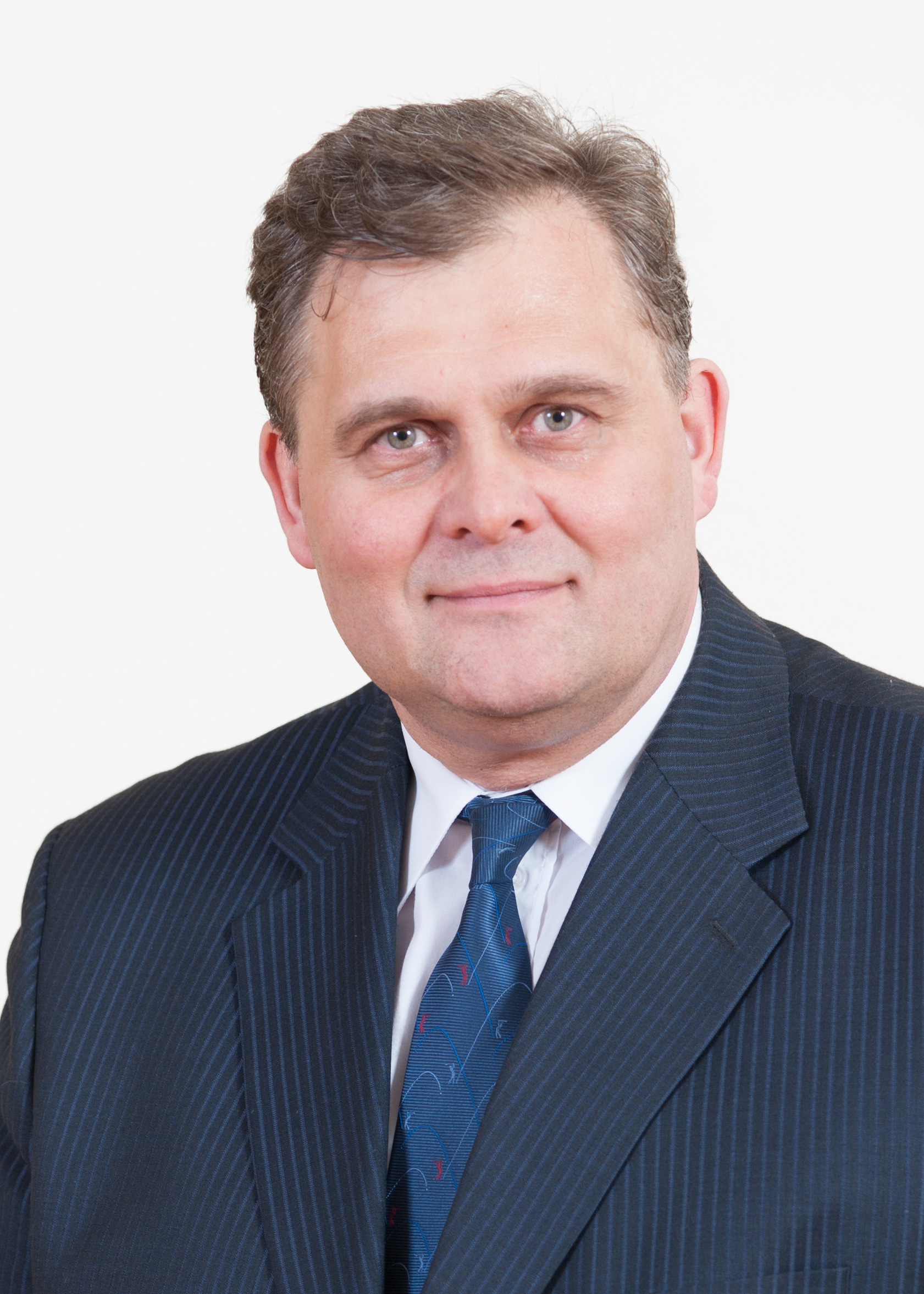
Raivo Aeg in 2015

Raivo Aeg (born on 4 July 1962 Kuressaare) is an Estonian politician and police officer. He is member of the XIV Riigikogu. Since 2014 he has belonged to the Isamaa party.

== Early life ==
Aeg graduated from the Tallinn Polytechnic Institute in 1985.

== Career ==
From 2008 to 2013 he was the head director of the Estonian Internal Security Service (Estonian: Kaitsepolitseiamet).

Since 2014 he has been a member of the Isamaa political party.

Since 2017 he is member of Tallinn City Council.

== Personal life ==
Aeg has one son, and speaks Estonian, English, Finnish, and Russian.
