= Andrus Ansip's second cabinet =

Government of Estonia from 2007 to 2011

- 45th Cabinet of Estonia
- 2007–2011
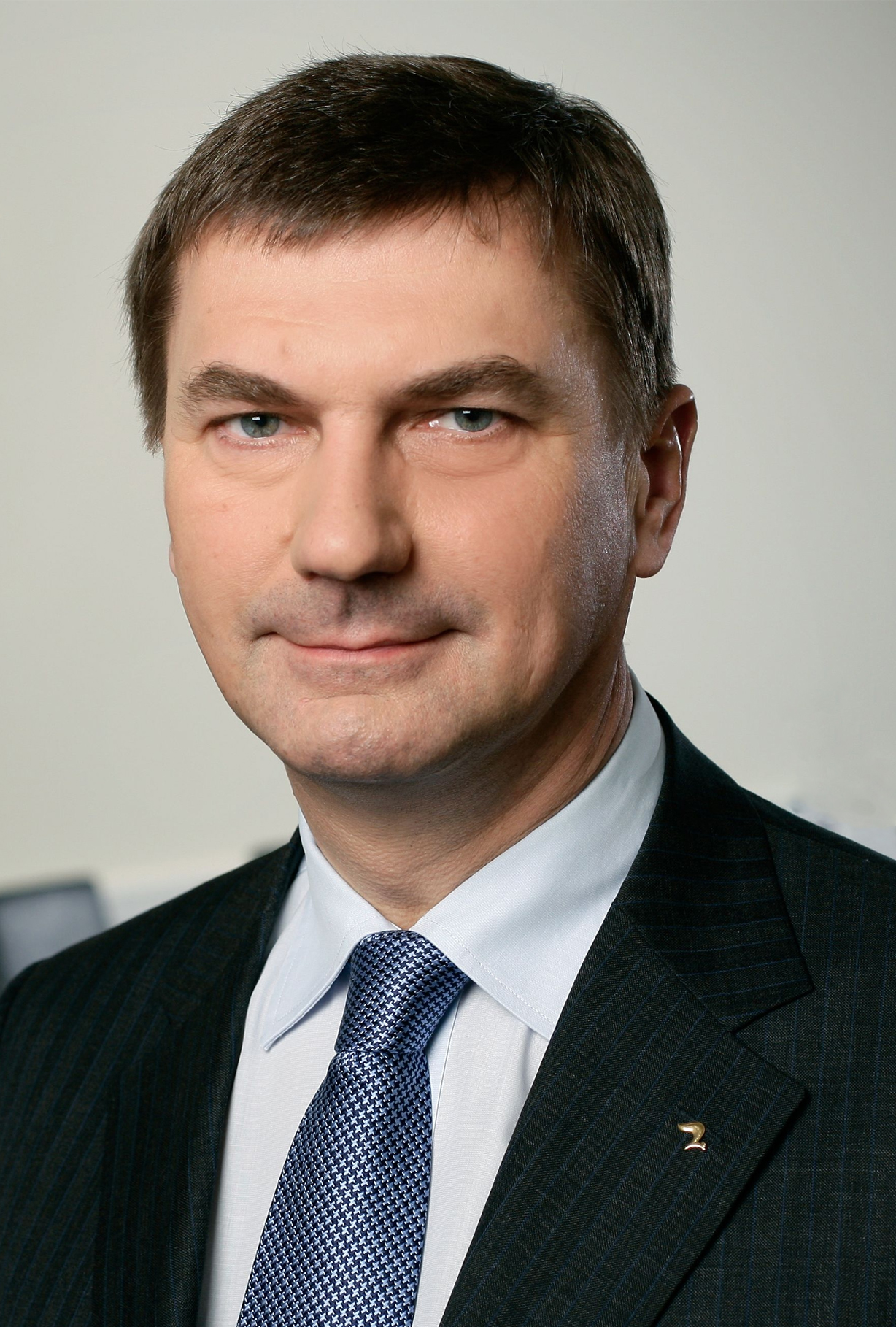
- Date formed: 5 April 2007
- Date dissolved: 6 April 2011

People and organisations
- Head of state: Toomas Hendrik Ilves (2006-2016)
- Head of government: Andrus Ansip
- No. of ministers: 14
- Ministers removed: 5
- Member parties: Estonian Reform Party, Pro Patria and Res Publica Union; Social Democratic Party (2007–2009)
- Opposition parties: Social Democratic Party (2009–), Estonian Centre Party

History
- Election: 2007 election
- Legislature term: 4 years
- Predecessor: Andrus Ansip's first cabinet
- Successor: Andrus Ansip's third cabinet

The Andrus Ansip's second cabinet was the Cabinet of Estonia between 5 April 2007 and 6 April 2011. It was a Triple Alliance coalition cabinet of the free market liberal Estonian Reform Party, conservative Union of Pro Patria and Res Publica and Social Democratic Party.

As in the dire economic situation the government turned out incapable to solve the problem of required budget cuts the Social Democratic Party left from the coalition on 21 May 2009 and its three ministers were relieved from their posts. Coalition talks with the People's Union of Estonia were derailed on 1 June 2009 by councils of the People's Union and of the Union of Pro Patria and Res Publica. Therefore, from 4 June 2009 the cabinet continued as a minority cabinet with 50 seats out of 101 in the Riigikogu.

It was succeeded by Ansip's next cabinet on 6 April 2011 after the 2011 election.

== Ministers ==
Portfolio	Minister	Took office	Left office	Party
Government's Office
Prime Minister	Andrus Ansip	13 April 2005	26 March 2014	Reform
Ministry of Finance
Minister of Finance	Ivari Padar	5 April 2007	21 May 2009	SDE
Minister of Finance	Jürgen Ligi	4 June 2009	to the next cabinet	Reform
Ministry of Foreign Affairs
Minister of Foreign Affairs	Urmas Paet	13 April 2005	to the next cabinet	Reform
Ministry of Economic Affairs and Communications
Minister of Economic Affairs and Communications	Juhan Parts	6 April 2007	to the next cabinet	Pro Patria and Res Publica
Ministry of Justice
Minister of Justice	Rein Lang	13 April 2005	6 April 2011	Reform
Ministry of Defence
Minister of Defence	Jaak Aaviksoo	5 April 2007	6 April 2011	Pro Patria and Res Publica
Ministry of Culture
Minister of Culture	Laine Jänes	5 April 2007	6 April 2011	Reform
Ministry of the Interior
Minister of the Interior	Jüri Pihl	5 April 2007	21 May 2009	SDE
Minister of the Interior	Marko Pomerants	4 June 2009	6 April 2011	Pro Patria and Res Publica
Minister of Regional Affairs	Vallo Reimaa	5 April 2007	22 January 2008	Pro Patria and Res Publica
Minister of Regional Affairs	Siim Valmar Kiisler	23 January 2008	to the next cabinet	Pro Patria and Res Publica
Ministry of Education and Research
Minister of Education and Research	Tõnis Lukas	5 April 2007	6 April 2011	Pro Patria and Res Publica
Ministry of Environment
Minister of Environment	Jaanus Tamkivi	5 April 2007	6 April 2011	Reform
Ministry of Social Affairs
Minister of Social Affairs	Maret Maripuu	5 April 2007	23 February 2009	Reform
Minister of Social Affairs	Hanno Pevkur	23 February 2009	to the next cabinet	Reform
Minister (Population and Ethnic Affairs)	Urve Palo	5 April 2007	21 May 2009	SDE
Ministry of Agriculture
Minister of Agriculture	Helir-Valdor Seeder	6 April 2007	to the next cabinet	Pro Patria and Res Publica

== See also ==
- Politics of Estonia
- Triple Alliance (Estonia)

Preceded by Andrus Ansip's first cabinet	Government of Estonia; 2007-2011	Succeeded by Andrus Ansip's third cabinet
