= Andrus Ansip's third cabinet =

Government of Estonia from 2011 to 2014

- 46th Cabinet of Estonia
- 2011–2014
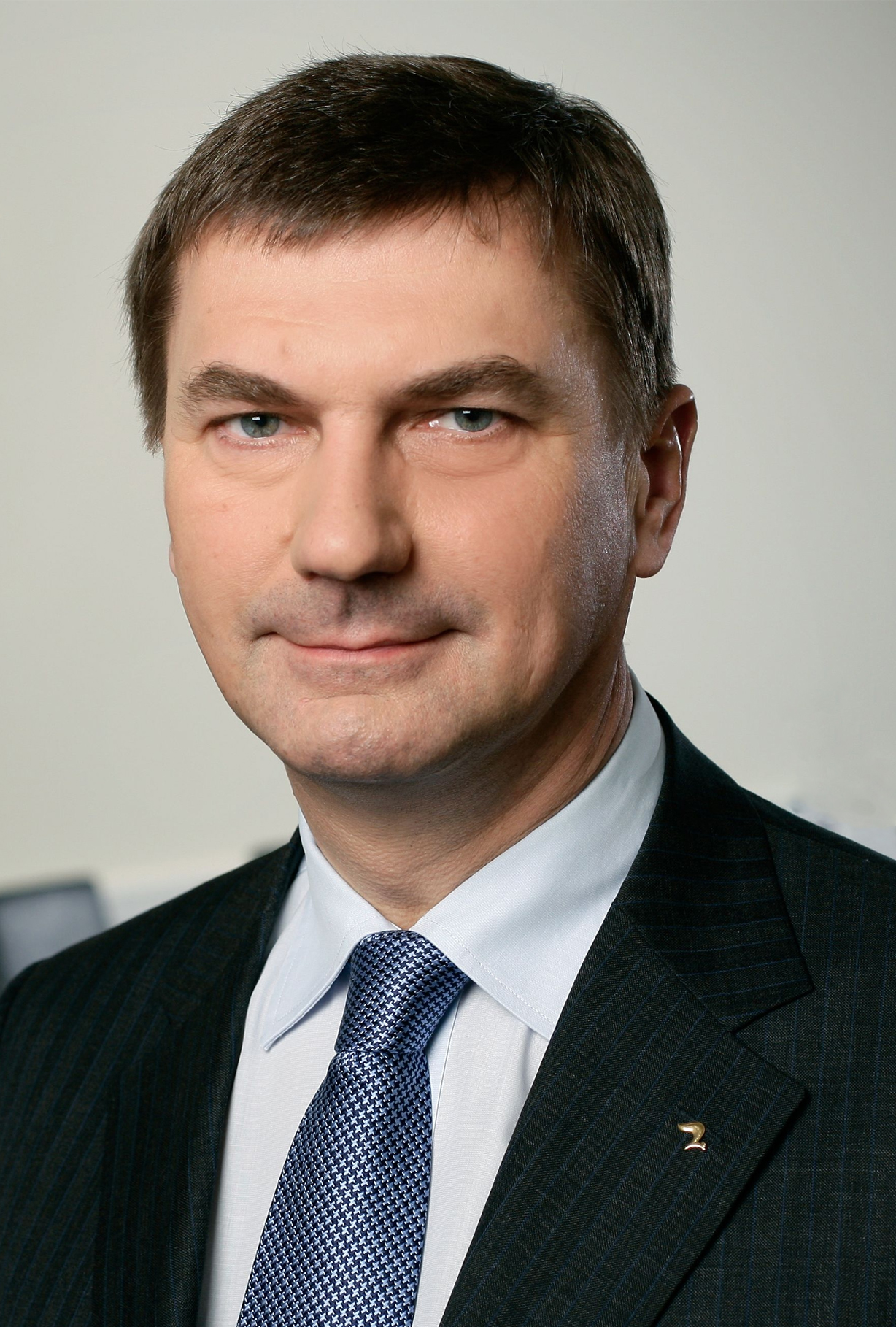
- Date formed: 6 April 2011
- Date dissolved: 26 March 2014

People and organisations
- Head of state: Toomas Hendrik Ilves (2006-present)
- Head of government: Andrus Ansip
- No. of ministers: 13
- Ministers removed: 4
- Member parties: Estonian Reform Party, Pro Patria and Res Publica Union
- Status in legislature: Majority cabinet
- Opposition parties: Social Democratic Party, Estonian Centre Party

History
- Election: 2011 election
- Legislature term: 4 years
- Predecessor: Andrus Ansip's second cabinet
- Successor: Taavi Rõivas' first cabinet

The Andrus Ansip's third cabinet was the Cabinet of Estonia between 6 April 2011 and 26 March 2014. It was a coalition cabinet of the free market liberal Estonian Reform Party (7 portfolios) and conservative Union of Pro Patria and Res Publica (6 portfolios).

The cabinet was formed following the 2011 parliamentary election. It left office after the resignation of Andrus Ansip, who had decided not to run in the next elections and wished to enable his successor to lead his party into 2015 election. During the reign of the cabinet Ansip became the longest-serving incumbent head of government in the European Union on 4 December 2013.

It was succeeded by the Taavi Rõivas' cabinet on 26 March 2014.

== Ministers ==
Portfolio	Minister	Took office	Left office	Party
Government's Office
Prime Minister	Andrus Ansip	13 April 2005	26 March 2014	Reform
Ministry of Finance
Minister of Finance	Jürgen Ligi	4 June 2009	to the next cabinet	Reform
Ministry of Foreign Affairs
Minister of Foreign Affairs	Urmas Paet	13 April 2005	to the next cabinet	Reform
Ministry of Economic Affairs and Communications
Minister of Economic Affairs and Communications	Juhan Parts	6 April 2007	26 March 2014	Pro Patria and Res Publica
Ministry of Justice
Minister of Justice	Kristen Michal	6 April 2011	10 December 2012	Reform
Minister of Justice	Hanno Pevkur	11 December 2012	26 March 2014	Reform
Ministry of Defence
Minister of Defence	Mart Laar	6 April 2011	11 May 2012	Pro Patria and Res Publica
Minister of Defence	Urmas Reinsalu	11 May 2012	26 March 2014	Pro Patria and Res Publica
Ministry of Culture
Minister of Culture	Rein Lang	6 April 2011	4 December 2013	Reform
Minister of Culture	Urve Tiidus	4 December 2013	to the next cabinet	Reform
Ministry of the Interior
Minister of the Interior	Ken-Marti Vaher	6 April 2011	26 March 2014	Pro Patria and Res Publica
Minister of Regional Affairs	Siim Valmar Kiisler	23 January 2008	26 March 2014	Pro Patria and Res Publica
Ministry of Education and Research
Minister of Education and Research	Jaak Aaviksoo	6 April 2011	26 March 2014	Pro Patria and Res Publica
Ministry of Environment
Minister of Environment	Keit Pentus	6 April 2011	to the next cabinet	Reform
Ministry of Social Affairs
Minister of Social Affairs	Hanno Pevkur	23 February 2009	10 December 2012	Reform
Minister of Social Affairs	Taavi Rõivas	11 December 2012	26 March 2014	Reform
Ministry of Agriculture
Minister of Agriculture	Helir-Valdor Seeder	06 April 2007	26 March 2014	Pro Patria and Res Publica

== See also ==
- Politics of Estonia

Preceded by Andrus Ansip's second cabinet	Government of Estonia; 2011-2014	Succeeded by Taavi Rõivas' first cabinet
