= 2011 Estonian parliamentary election =

- 6 March 2011

101 seats in the Riigikogu 51 seats needed for a majority
- Turnout: 63.53%
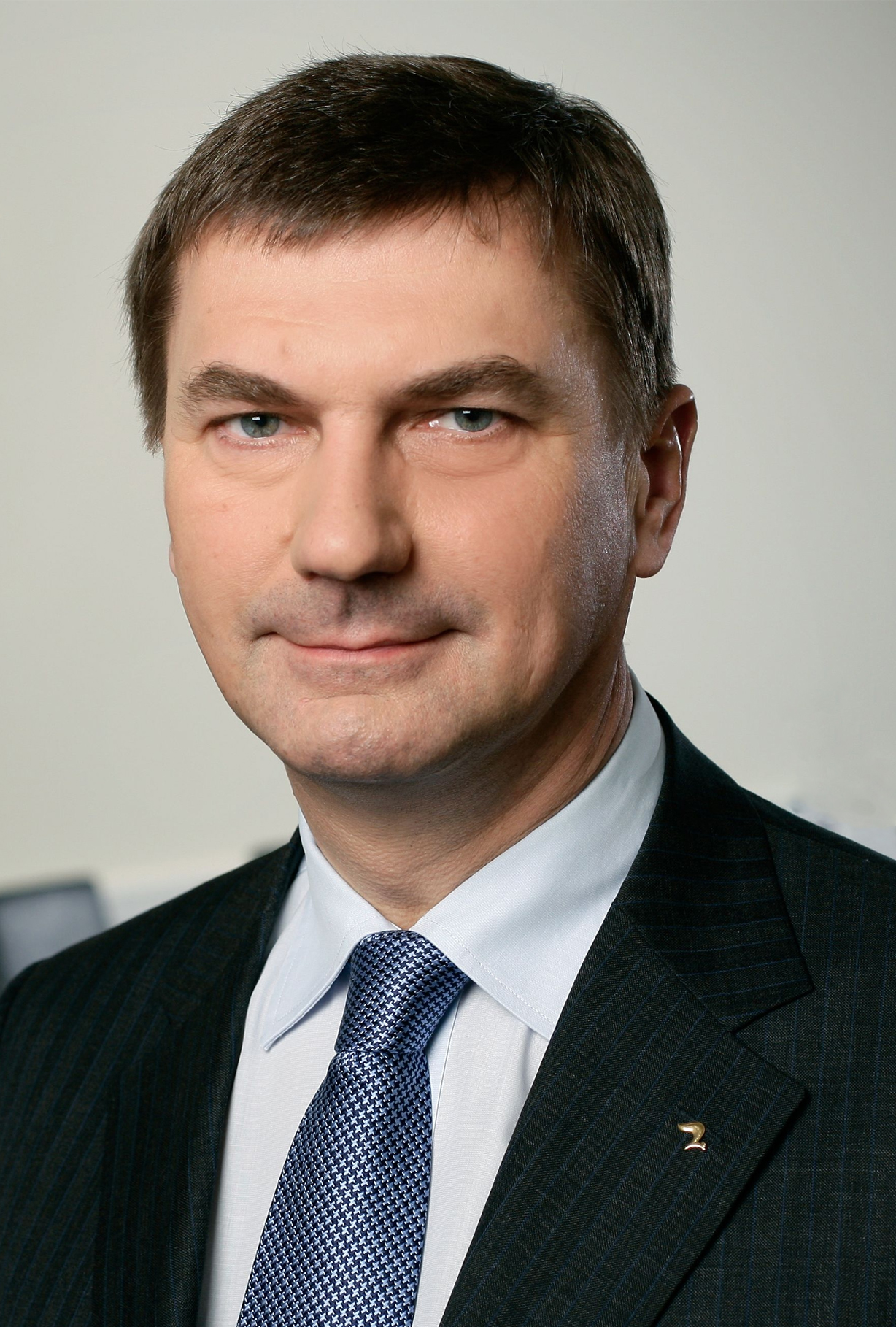

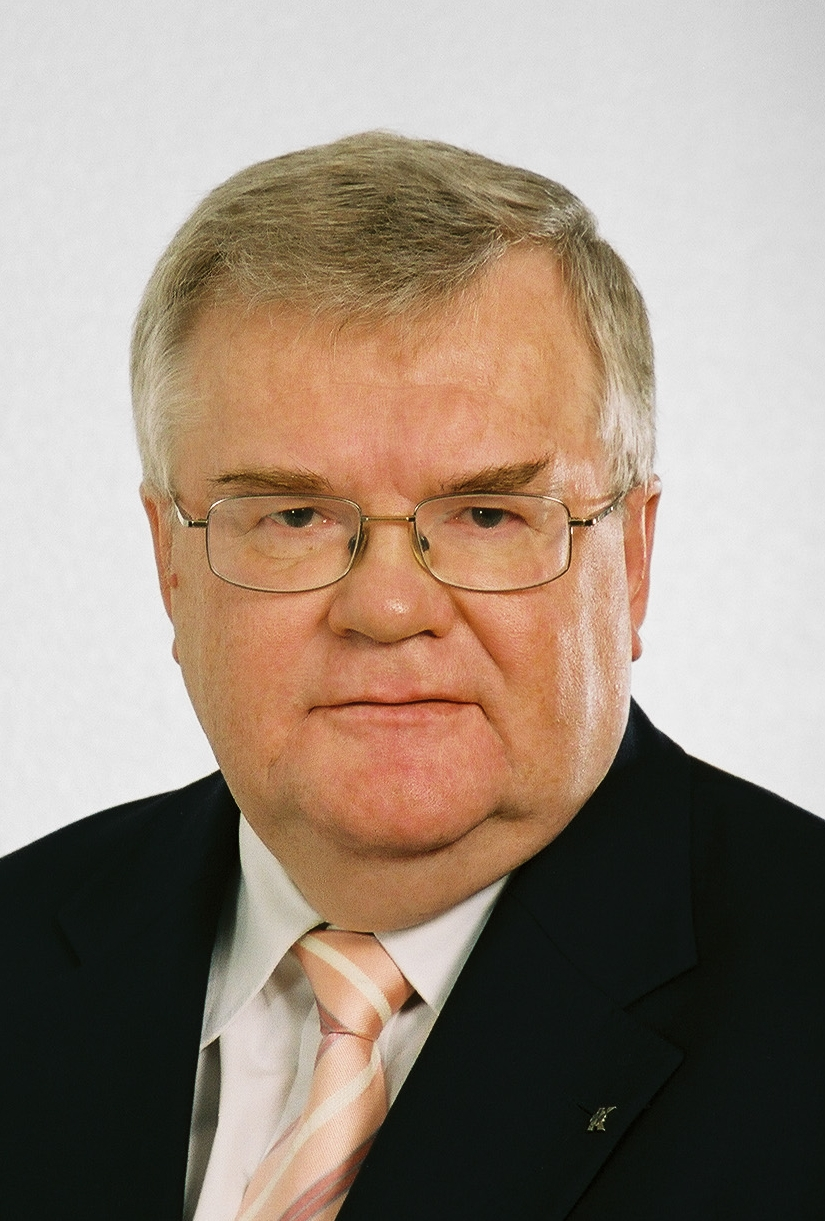

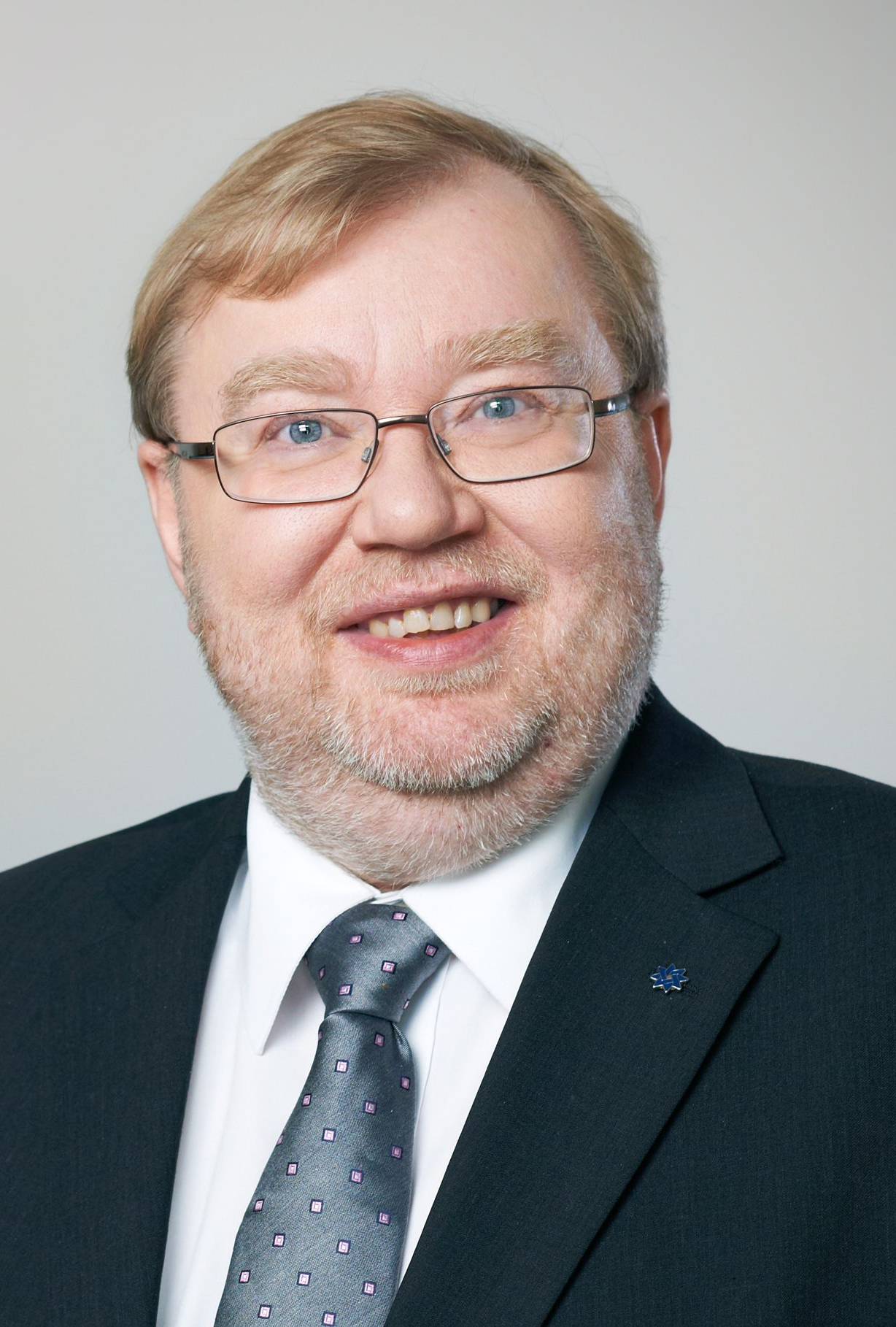

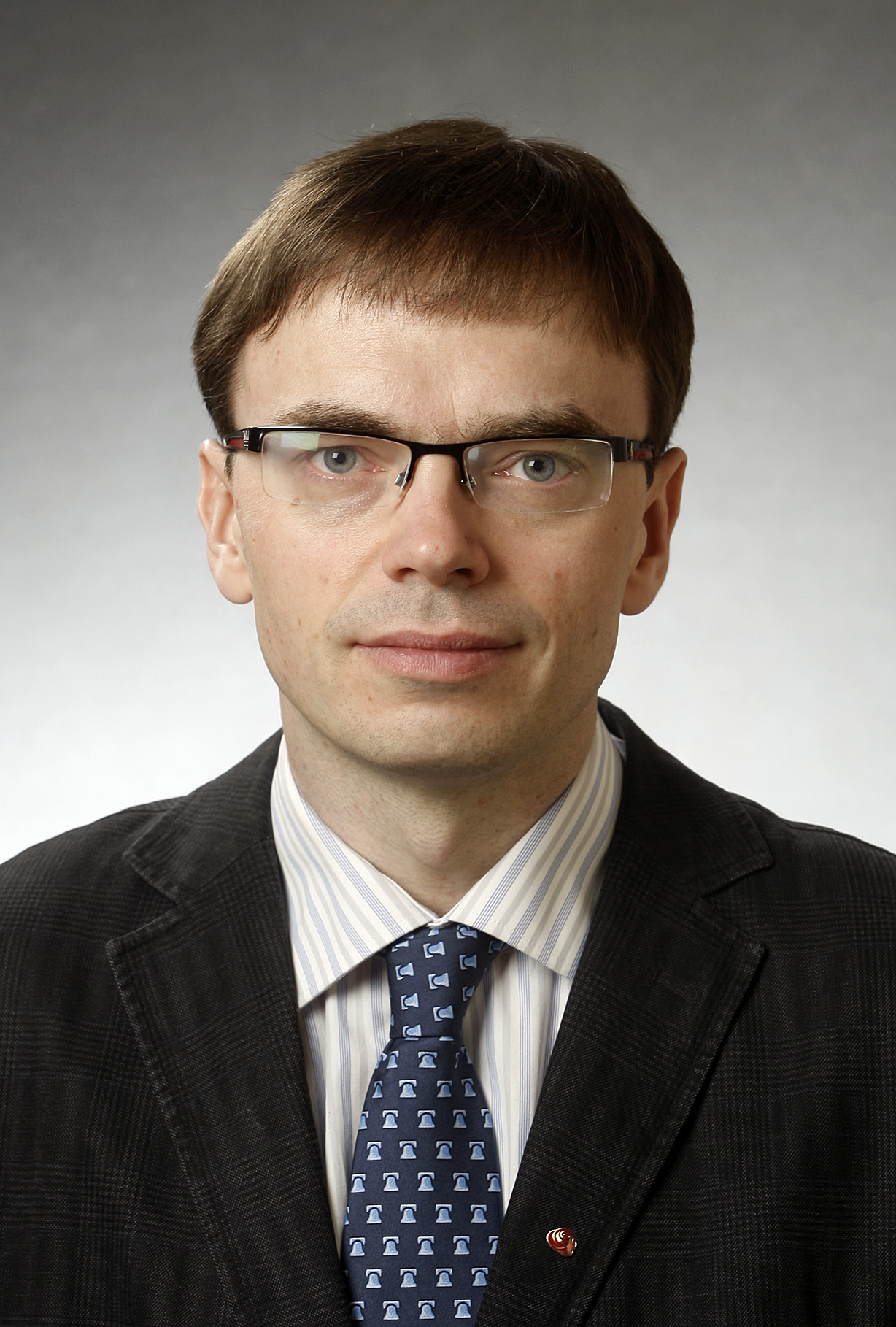
	First party	Second party
Leader	Andrus Ansip	Edgar Savisaar
Party	Reform	Centre
Last election	31 seats	29 seats
Seats won	33	26
Seat change	▲2	▼3
Popular vote	164,255	134,124
Percentage	28.56%	23.32%
Swing	▲0.76pp	▼2.78pp
	Third party	Fourth party
Leader	Mart Laar	Sven Mikser
Party	IRL	SDE
Last election	19 seats	10 seats
Seats won	23	19
Seat change	▲4	▲9
Popular vote	118,023	98,307
Percentage	20.52%	17.09%
Swing	▲2.62pp	▲6.46pp
- Results by electoral district
Prime Minister before election
Andrus Ansip
Reform
Prime Minister after election
Andrus Ansip
Reform

A parliamentary election was held in Estonia on 6 March 2011, with e-voting between 24 February and 2 March 2011. The newly elected 101 members of the 12th Riigikogu assembled at Toompea Castle in Tallinn within ten days of the election. The incumbent government of the Reform Party and IRL continued in office until 2014 when Prime Minister Andrus Ansip resigned, ending his tenure as the longest-serving prime minister in contemporary Estonian history. He was replaced by Taavi Rõivas who formed a new coalition government with SDE. The Riigikogu elected after this election was the least fragmented in Estonian history, featuring only four parties.

The election was marked by the highest number of running independents (32) since 1992. Several independent candidates were members of the Estonian Patriotic Movement and many of them would later become known faces in the Conservative People's Party of Estonia (EKRE), including future leaders Mart Helme and Martin Helme.

== Electoral system ==
The 101 members of the Riigikogu (Parliament of Estonia) were elected using a form of proportional representation for a four-year term. The seats were allocated using a modified D'Hondt method. The country is divided into twelve multi-mandate electoral districts. There is a nationwide threshold of 5% for party lists, but if the number of votes cast for a candidate exceeds or equals the simple quota (which shall be obtained by dividing the number of valid votes cast in the electoral district by the number of mandates in the district) the candidate is elected.

== Seats by electoral district ==
The district number	Electoral District	Seats
1	Haabersti, Põhja-Tallinn and Kristiine districts in Tallinn	9
2	Kesklinn, Lasnamäe and Pirita districts in Tallinn	11
3	Mustamäe and Nõmme districts in Tallinn	8
4	Harjumaa (without Tallinn) and Raplamaa counties	14
5	Hiiumaa, Läänemaa and Saaremaa counties	6
6	Lääne-Virumaa county	5
7	Ida-Virumaa county	8
8	Järvamaa and Viljandimaa counties	8
9	Jõgevamaa and Tartumaa counties (without Tartu)	7
10	Tartu city	8
11	Võrumaa, Valgamaa and Põlvamaa counties	9
12	Pärnumaa county	8

== Opinion polls ==
Pre-election polls put the Reform Party, led by Prime Minister Andrus Ansip, ahead of its main rival, the opposition Centre Party. The former is right of centre, the latter is considered populist, slightly to the left on economic matters. Both parties are members of the European Liberal Democrat and Reform Party. Reform was slightly more socially liberal in comparison to Centre, while SDE was the most liberal out of the parties. IRL, meanwhile, was socially conservative, together with Centre. However, most parties had ruled out cooperation with Centre after its leader's controversial comments on regarding the Bronze Night riots and history of scandals.

Date	Polling firm	Ref	Kesk	IRL	SDE	Greens	ERL	Others	Lead	Ansip's cabinet – Opposition
6 Mar 11	Election Results	28.6	23.3	20.5	17.1	3.8	2.1	4.6	5.3	49.1 - 50.9
25 Feb 11	TNS Emor	28	25	21	16	4	2	—N/a	3	49 - 47
Jan 11	Turu-Uuringute	25	19	12	9	2	2	9	6	37 - 41
Jan 11	TNS Emor	36	23	16	14	4	2	—N/a	13	52 - 43
Dec 10	TNS Emor	36	23	15	13	5	4	—N/a	13	51 - 45

== Contesting parties ==
The Estonian National Electoral Committee announced that nine political parties and 32 individual candidates registered to take part in the 2011 parliamentary election. Their registration numbers and order were determined by a draw lot.

#	Name	Ideology	Political position	Leader	Total candidates	2007 result	
#	Name	Ideology	Political position	Leader	Total candidates	Votes (%)	Seats
1	Greens	Green politics	Centre-left	Aleksei Lotman	122	7.1%	6 / 101
2	IRL	Liberal conservatism	Centre-right	Mart Laar	125	17.9%	19 / 101
3	Social Democratic Party	Social democracy	Centre-left	Sven Mikser	125	10.6%	10 / 101
4	Reform Party	Classical liberalism	Centre-right	Andrus Ansip	125	27.8%	31 / 101
5	Centre Party	Plurinationalism	Centre-left	Edgar Savisaar	125	26.1%	29 / 101
6	Russian Party	Russian minority interests	Syncretic	Stanislav Tšerepanov	16	0.2%	0 / 101
7	Independence Party	Estonian nationalism	Far-right	Vello Leito	16	0.2%	0 / 101
8	People's Union (Note: Members of the Estonian United Left Party ran on the list of the People's Union.)	Agrarianism	Centre to centre-left	Andrus Blok	88	7.1%	6 / 101
9	Christian Democrats	Christian democracy	Centre-right	Peeter Võsu	15	1.7%	0 / 101
—	Individual candidates	—			32	did not exist	

== Conduct ==
The Office for Democratic Institutions and Human Rights of the Organization for Security and Co-operation in Europe observed this election and issued a report with a number of recommendations.

== Results ==
Party	Votes	%	Seats	+/–
Estonian Reform Party	164,255	28.56	33	+2
Estonian Centre Party	134,124	23.32	26	–3
Pro Patria and Res Publica Union	118,023	20.52	23	+4
Social Democratic Party	98,307	17.09	19	+9
Estonian Greens	21,824	3.79	0	–6
People's Union of Estonia	12,184	2.12	0	–6
Russian Party in Estonia	5,029	0.87	0	0
Party of Estonian Christian Democrats	2,934	0.51	0	0
Estonian Independence Party	2,571	0.45	0	0
Independents	15,882	2.76	0	0
Total	575,133	100.00	101	0
Valid votes	575,133	99.12		
Invalid/blank votes	5,131	0.88		
Total votes	580,264	100.00		
Registered voters/turnout	913,346	63.53		
Source: VVK
