= Siim Valmar Kiisler =

Estonian politician (born 1965)

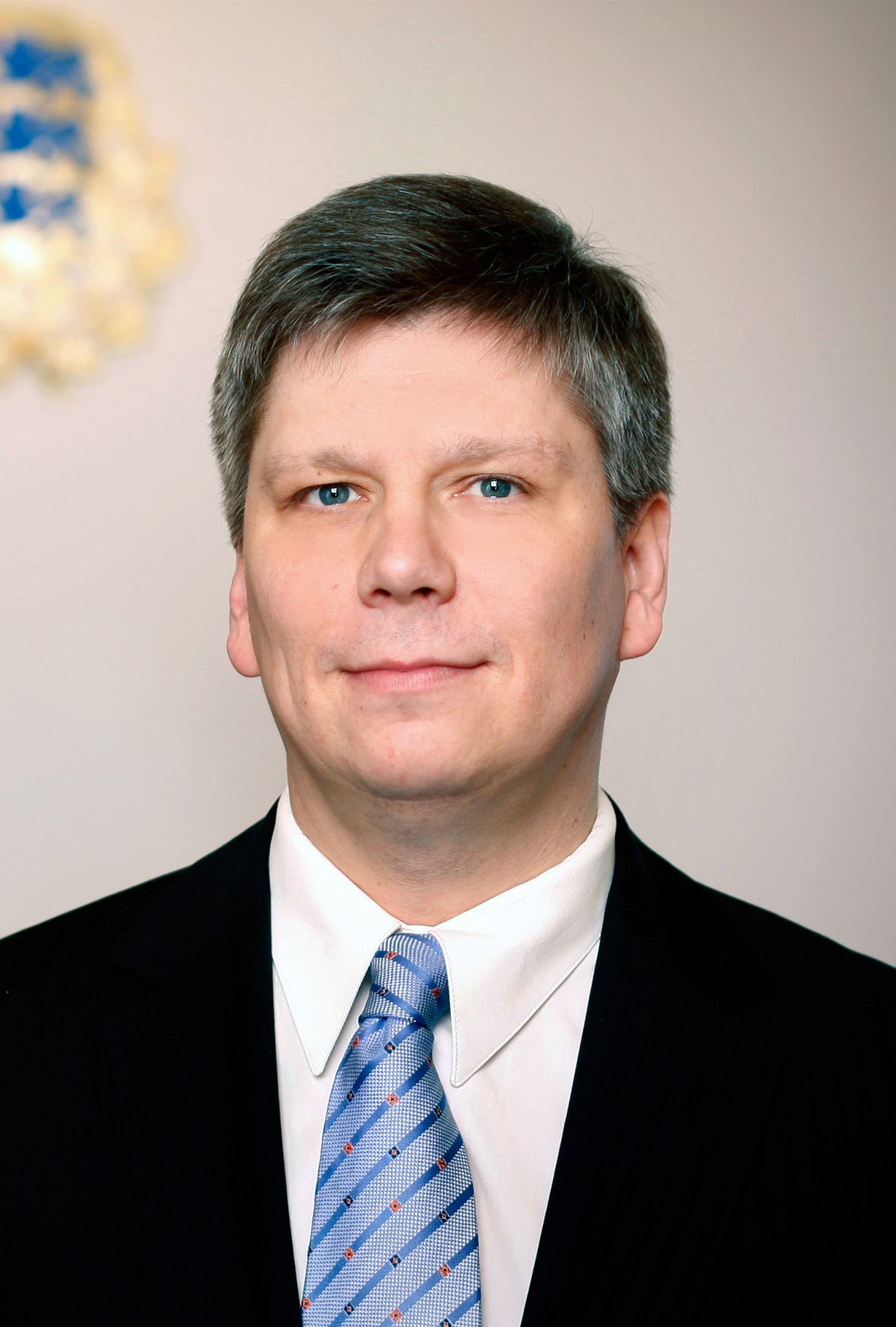
- Siim Valmar Kiisler in 2011.

Minister of the Environment
- In office 12 June 2017 – 29 April 2019
- Prime Minister: Jüri Ratas
- Preceded by: Marko Pomerants
- Succeeded by: Rene Kokk

Minister of Regional Affairs of Estonia
- In office 23 January 2008 – 26 March 2014
- Prime Minister: Andrus Ansip
- Preceded by: Vallo Reimaa
- Succeeded by: Hanno Pevkur

Personal details
- Born: 6 November 1965 (age 60) Tallinn, then part of Estonian SSR, Soviet Union
- Party: Parempoolsed (after 2022)
- Other political affiliations: Isamaa (before 2022)
- Education: Technical University of Tallinn
- Profession: Businessman

Siim Valmar Kiisler (born 6 November 1965) is an Estonian politician, a member of the Parempoolsed, former member of Isamaa (Pro Patria and Res Publica Union).

== Personal life ==
In 1984, he finished his secondary education in Tallinn, and attended the Tallinn University of Technology. Seven years later, he received his degree in automated control systems.

He was president of the advisory council of the company Glacier Eesti AS between 1995 and 2003.

Married, he is the father of four boys (Taavi Kalle, Heiki Rein, Mati Kalev, Arti Tanel) and a girl (Mari Helmi). He speaks Estonian, English, Russian, and Finnish.

== Political career ==
He was elected to the municipal council of Tallinn in 1999. In the same year, Siim-Valmer Kiisler became the governor of the Kesklinn district in Tallinn for two years.

Reelected to the municipal council in 2002, he left in 2003, to seek election as an MP in the Riigikogu. He was elected until 2005, and again between 2006 and 2007.

He was first a member of the Res Publica party, which led the parliamentary group, and then joined the Union of Pro Patria and Res Publica (IRL).

He was re-elected to the Riigikogu on 4 March 2007, and named Vice-Minister of Economic Affairs and Communications, under Juhan Parts.

On 23 January 2008, Siim-Valmar Kiisler became Minister of Regional Affairs in the second cabinet of Andrus Ansip. He continued in the same capacity in the third cabinet of Andrus Ansip that was in office until 26 March 2014.

After the 2015 election, Kiisler became deputy group chairman of his party in the Riigikogu in 2016. On 12 June 2017, he was appointed Minister of the Environment in Ratas' first cabinet as the successor to Marko Pomerants. In the 2019 parliamentary election, he only received 379 votes and did not win re-election. It was only through the death of his party colleague Mart Nutt that Kiisler returned to the government in June 2019. After the resignation of Ratas' second cabinet, he had to leave the government, receiving nearly €26,000 in compensation.

In March 2022, the board of Isamaa expelled Kiisler from the party. He later joined the Parempoolsed party as its only member in the Riigikogu.

== See also ==
- Politics of Estonia

Political offices
Preceded by Elmar Sepp	Governor of Kesklinn district, Tallinn; 1999–2001	Succeeded by Erik Siigur
Preceded by Vallo Reimaa	Estonian Minister of Regional Affairs; 2008–2014	Succeeded by Hanno Pevkur (as Minister of the Interior and Regional Affairs)
