= Marko Pomerants =

Estonian politician (born 1964)

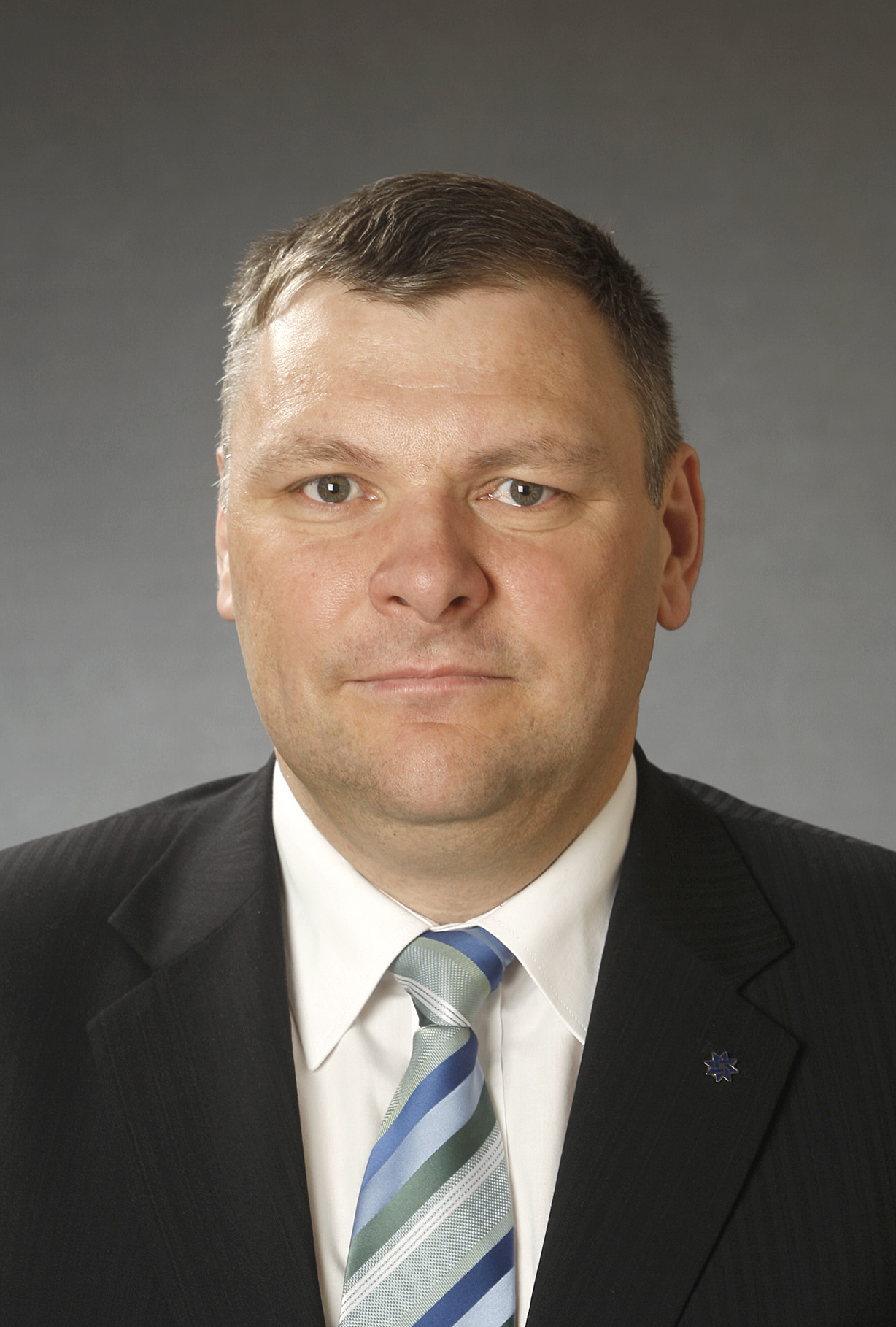

Minister of the Environment
- In office 9 April 2015 – 12 June 2017
- Prime Minister: Taavi Rõivas; Jüri Ratas
- Preceded by: Mati Raidma
- Succeeded by: Siim Kiisler

Minister of the Interior
- In office 4 June 2009 – 6 April 2011
- Prime Minister: Andrus Ansip
- Preceded by: Jüri Pihl
- Succeeded by: Ken-Marti Vaher

Minister of Social Affairs
- In office 10 April 2003 – 13 April 2005
- Prime Minister: Juhan Parts
- Preceded by: Siiri Oviir
- Succeeded by: Jaak Aab

Personal details
- Born: 24 September 1964 (age 62) Tamsalu, then part of Estonian SSR, Soviet Union
- Party: Pro Patria and Res Publica Union
- Education: University of Tartu

Marko Pomerants (born 24 September 1964) is an Estonian politician. He was the Minister of the Environment from 2015 to 2017. Previously, Pomerants served as the Minister of Social Affairs from 2003 to 2005 and as the Minister of the Interior from 2009 to 2012. Pomerants is a member of the Pro Patria and Res Publica Union.

== Early life ==
Marko Pomerants went to Tamsalu High School and completed higher education at the University of Tartu. He has degrees in geology and public administration.

== Political career ==
Pomerants began his political career in the Lääne-Viru County Environmental Department in 1994. A year later he became the Governor (Estonian: Maavanem) of the county and served for eight years.

In 2003, he was a member of the 10th Riigikogu. On 10 April 2003, Pomerants was appointed Minister of Social Affairs, serving until 13 April 2005.

From 2007 to 2009, he was a member of the 11th Riigikogu.

From 2009 to 2011, Pomerants served as the Minister of the Interior.

In 2015 parliamentary elections, Pomerants was re-elected to the Riigikogu with 2,681 individual votes.

On 9 April 2015, he became the Minister of the Environment in Taavi Rõivas' second cabinet.

Political offices
Preceded by Ants Leemets	Governor of Lääne-Viru County; 1995–2003	Succeeded by Riina Kaptein; Acting
Preceded by Siiri Oviir	Minister of Social Affairs; 2003–2005	Succeeded by Jaak Aab
Preceded by Jüri Pihl	Minister of the Interior; 2009–2011	Succeeded by Ken-Marti Vaher
Preceded by Mati Raidma	Minister of the Environment; 2015–2017	Succeeded by Siim Valmar Kiisler
