= Merle Parts =

Estonian judge (born 1967)

- Born: Merle Mahlapuu; November 26, 1967 (age 58)
- Occupation: Judge
- Spouse: Juhan Parts (1987, divorced)

Merle Parts (née Merle Mahlapuu; born November 26, 1967) is an Estonian judge.

== Career ==
As a young woman, Parts aspired to become a film director. In 1994, Parts passed her judicial examination. She serves as a judge at the Harju County Court. On 31 March 2002, she was wounded by a bullet during a shooting in the Atrium parking lot. In 2012, she was awarded the Police and Border Guard Board Order of Merit.

== Family ==
Merle Parts was married to the politician Juhan Parts, with whom she had two children: Toomas-Hendrik and Pille-Riin. With her current husband Priit Tikerpe, Merle Parts has a son, Hans-Gustav.
