= Vallo Reimaa =

Estonian politician (born 1961)

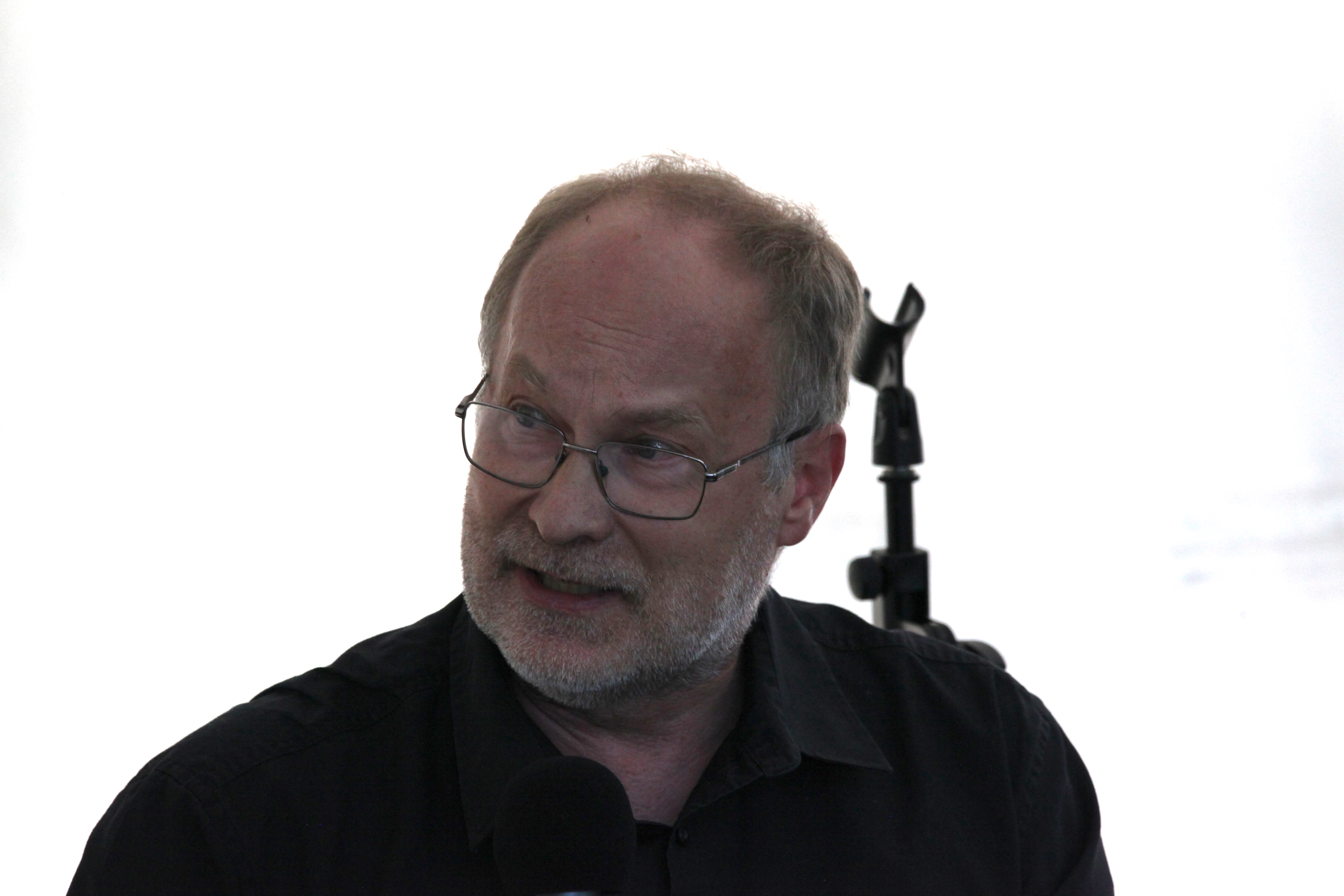
- Vallo Reimaa at Arvamusfestival in Paide (2022)

Minister of Regional Affairs
- In office 2007–2008
- Prime Minister: Andrus Ansip
- Preceded by: Jaan Õunapuu
- Succeeded by: Siim-Valmar Kiisler

Personal details
- Born: 8 May 1961 (age 64) Kose, then part of Estonian SSR, Soviet Union
- Party: Pro Patria and Res Publica Union

Vallo Reimaa (born 8 May 1961) is an Estonian politician of the Pro Patria and Res Publica Union. He was born in Kose, Harjumaa.

From April 2007 to January 2008 he was the Minister of Regional Affairs.

Political offices
Preceded by Jaan Õunapuu	Estonian Minister of Regional Affairs; 2007–2008	Succeeded by Siim-Valmar Kiisler
