= Ken-Marti Vaher =

Estonian politician

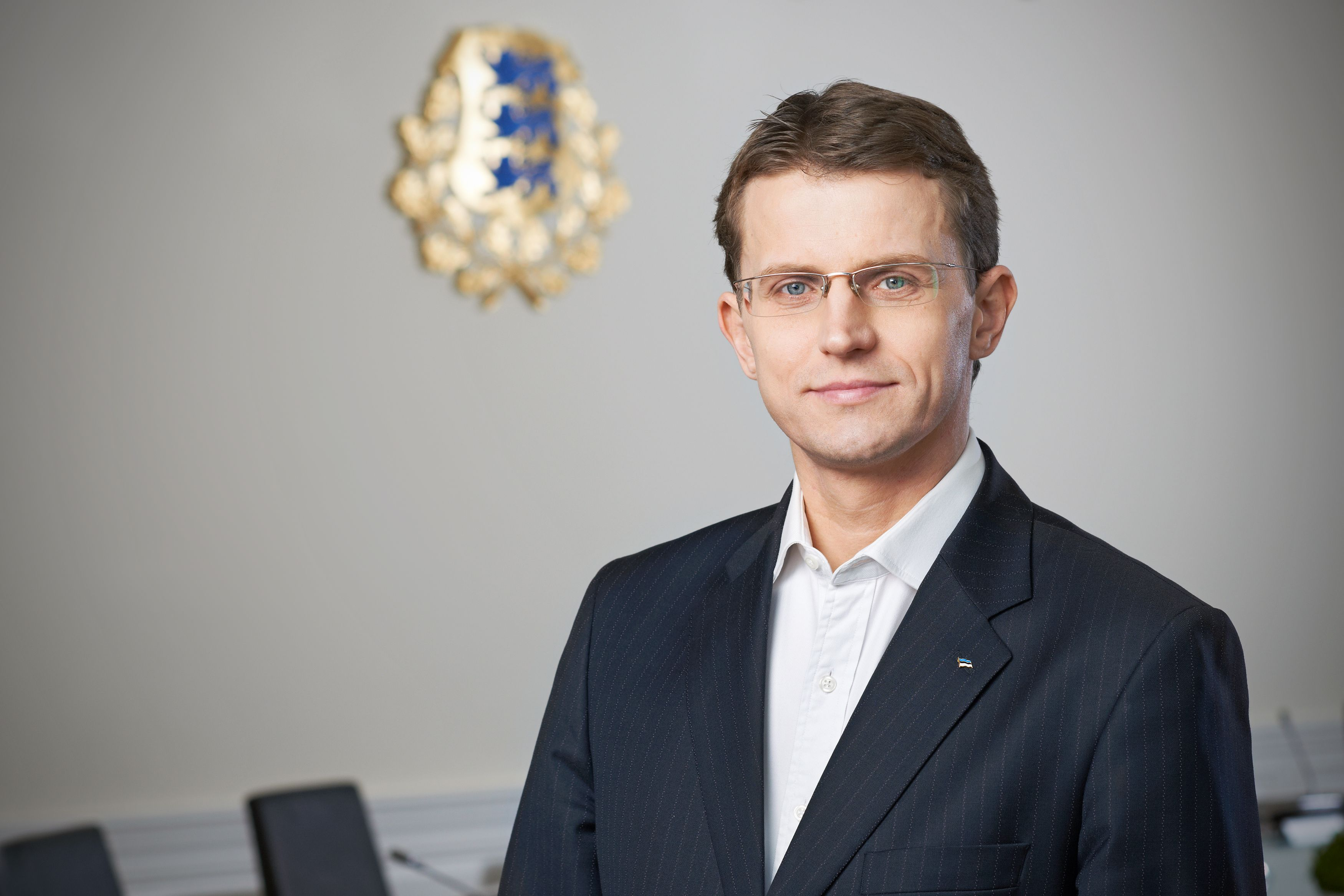
- Ken-Marti Vaher in 2011.

Minister of the Interior of Estonia
- In office 6 April 2011 – 26 March 2014
- Prime Minister: Andrus Ansip
- Preceded by: Marko Pomerants
- Succeeded by: Hanno Pevkur

Minister of Justice of Estonia
- In office 10 April 2003 – 12 April 2005
- Prime Minister: Juhan Parts
- Preceded by: Märt Rask
- Succeeded by: Rein Lang

Personal details
- Born: 5 September 1974 (age 51) Tallinn, then part of Estonian SSR, Soviet Union
- Party: Union of Pro Patria and Res Publica

Ken-Marti Vaher (born 5 September 1974) is a leading member of the Estonian Pro Patria and Res Publica Union party.

He has served twice as a Minister; Minister of Justice (2003–2005) and Minister of the Interior (2011–2014).

== Career ==
Vaher, born in Tallinn on 5 September 1974, was educated at the University of Tartu, where he received a bachelor's degree in law. A career politician and civil servant, Vaher served as Director of the State Audit Office as well as a member of the Tallinn City Council, before being appointed to the Minister of Justice position in the Juhan Parts government.

On 21 March 2005, Vaher received a vote of no confidence from the Riigikogu. The vote followed concerns about the handling of a controversial anti-corruption plan. The plan, as it was proposed, would have established a quota system of how many civil servants had to be prosecuted every year, it was set on a per county basis. Members of the opposition in the Riigikogu considered the programme as draconian. On 24 March 2005, Prime Minister Juhan Parts announced that he would step down from the position of Prime Minister and requested that the President reform the government, in part having to do with Parts' support for the program.

In the 2015 parliamentary election, Vaher was re-elected to the parliament with 2,313 individual votes.

Preceded by Märt Rask	Minister of Justice; 2003–2005	Succeeded by Rein Lang
Preceded by Marko Pomerants	Minister of the Interior; 2011–2014	Succeeded by Hanno Pevkur
