= Hindrek-Peeter Meri =

Estonian statesman

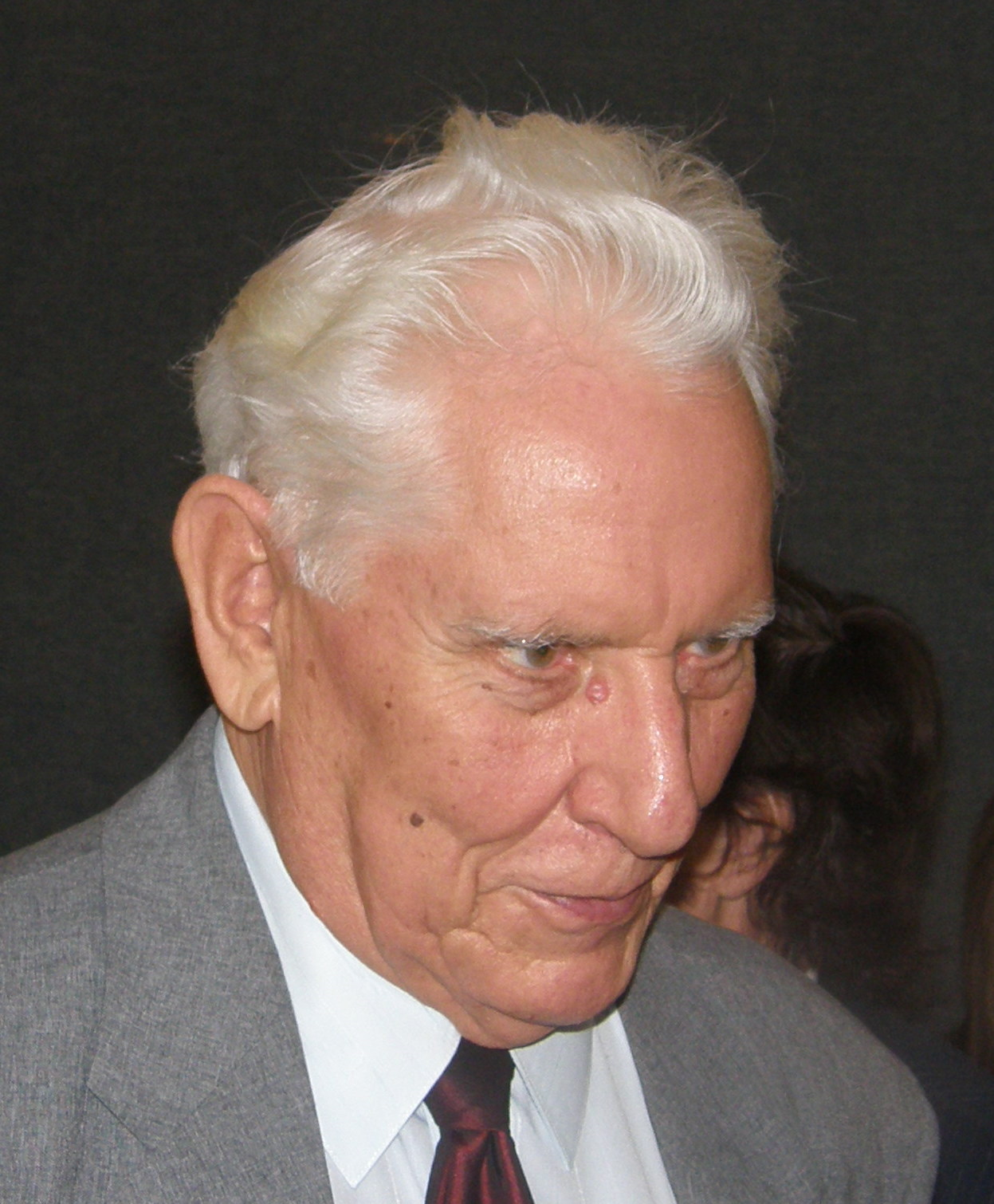
Hindrek-Peeter Meri

Hindrek-Peeter Meri (21 February 1934 – 29 September 2009) was an Estonian statesman.

1957–1990, he worked at State Planning Committee of the Estonian SSR. Then from 1990 to 1997, he served as Auditor General of Estonia.

== Personal life ==
Hindrek-Peeter's brother was Estonian writer and president Lennart Meri.
