= Jüri Pihl =

Estonian politician (1954–2019)

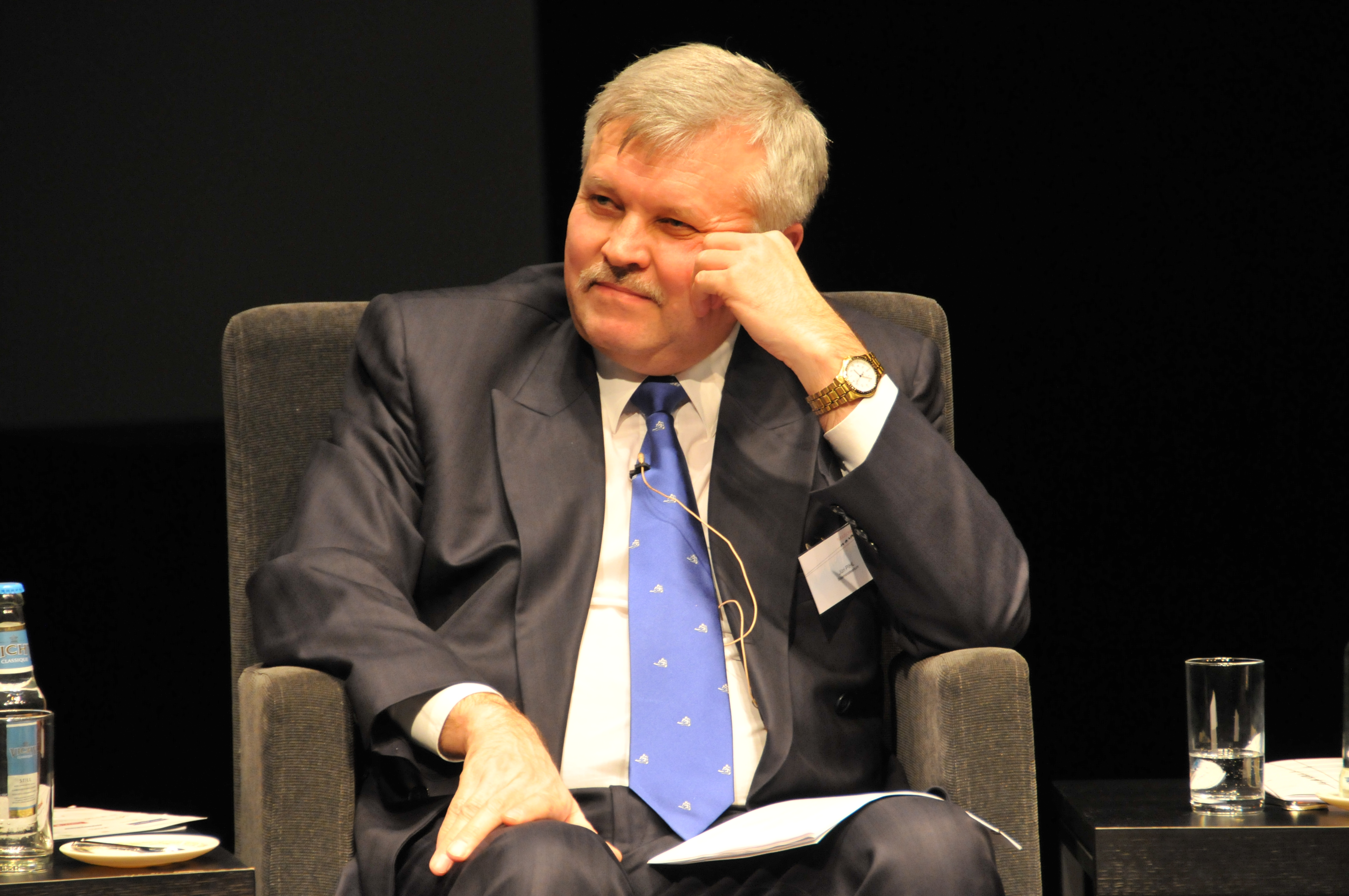
- Jüri Pihl in 2008.

Minister of the Interior
- In office 5 April 2007 – 21 May 2009
- Prime Minister: Andrus Ansip
- Preceded by: Kalle Laanet
- Succeeded by: Marko Pomerants

Personal details
- Born: 17 March 1954 Kuressaare, then part of Estonian SSR, Soviet Union
- Died: 3 February 2019 (aged 64)
- Party: Social Democratic Party
- Education: University of Tartu

Jüri Pihl (17 March 1954 – 3 February 2019) was an Estonian politician, a member of the Social Democratic Party.

From 1993 to 2003 he served as the General Director of Kaitsepolitsei, the central security institution in Estonia. After that, from 2003 to 2005 he was the Attorney General of the Republic of Estonia.

From 5 April 2007 to 21 May 2009 he was the Minister of the Interior in the second cabinet of Prime Minister Andrus Ansip. He was dismissed when the Social Democratic Party decided to leave the coalition.

From 7 March 2009 to 16 October 2010 he was the Chairman of the Social Democratic Party.

Preceded by Kalle Laanet	Minister of the Interior; April 5, 2007 – May 21, 2009	Succeeded by Marko Pomerants
