= Andrus Blok =

Estonian politician and rally driver

Andrus Blok (born 3 June 1961) is an Estonian politician and rally driver.

2010–2011, he was Chairman of People's Union of Estonia. Blok was the mayor of the former Rakke Parish.

In 1989 he won Estonian Championships in rally.

In 2006, he was awarded by the Order of the White Star, IV Class.
