= Stenbock House =

Official seat of government in Tallinn, Estonia

Coordinates: 59°26′17.8″N 24°44′25.3″E

- Stenbocki maja
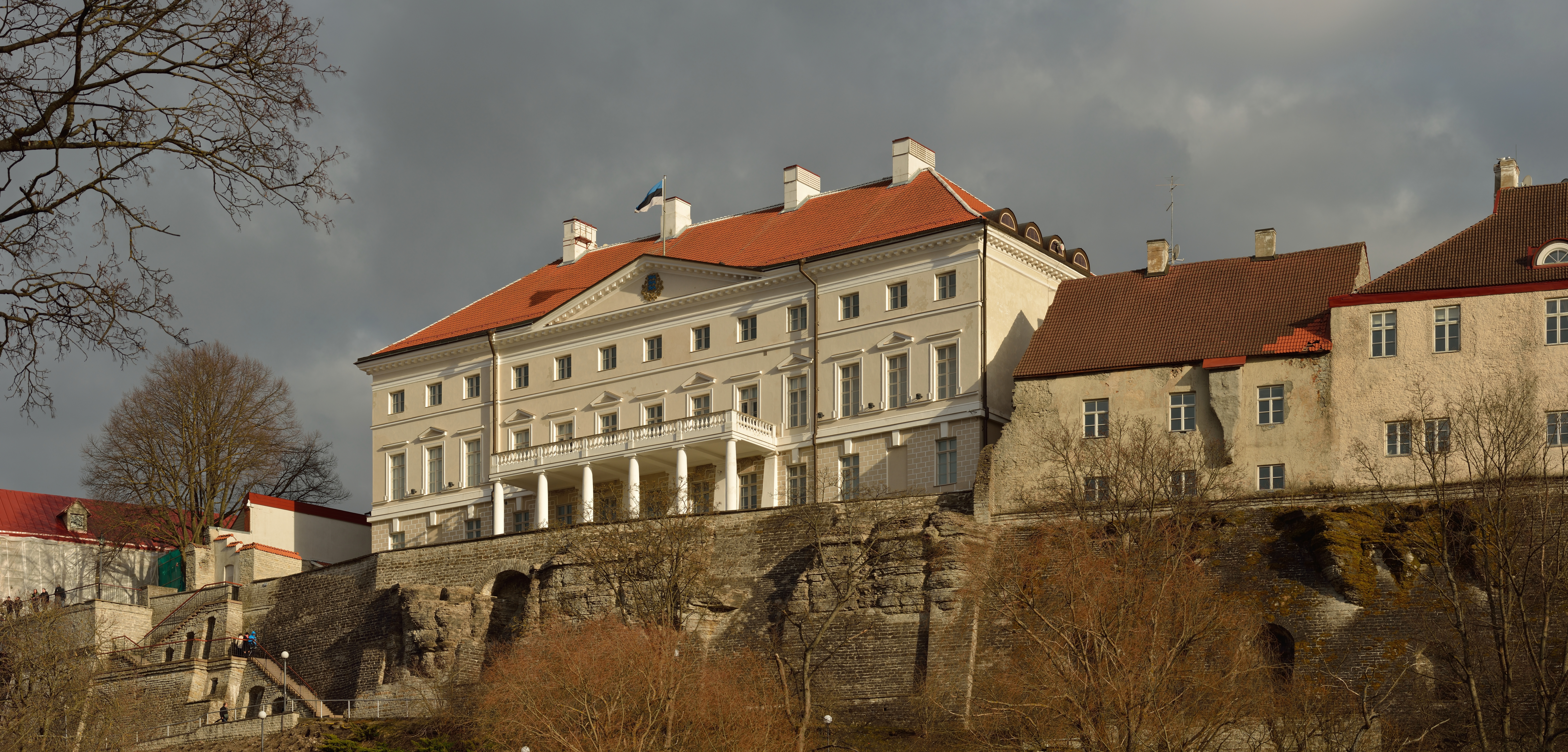
- Stenbock House in Tallinn
- Interactive map of the Stenbock House area

General information
- Architectural style: Neoclassicism
- Location: Tallinn, Estonia
- Current tenants: Seat of the Government of Estonia
- Construction started: 1787
- Completed: 1792
- Client: Jakob Pontus Stenbock

Design and construction
- Architect: Johann Caspar Mohr

Stenbock House (Estonian: Stenbocki maja) is a prominent neo-classical building located on Toompea hill, Tallinn. It is the official seat of the Government of Estonia.

== History ==
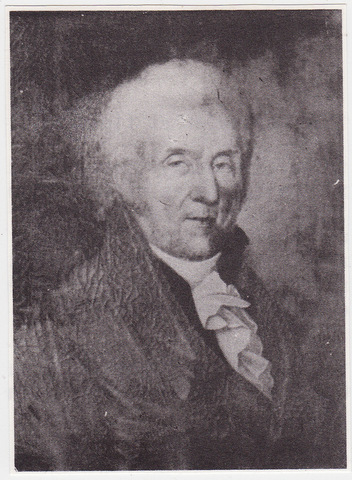
Count Jakob Pontus Stenbock (1744-1824)

The history of the Stenbock house goes back to the 1780s, when the local administration of what was then the Governorate of Estonia of the Russian Empire launched a scheme to erect new buildings for administrative purposes. Originally, the building was intended as a courthouse. Count Jakob Pontus Stenbock, an influential local aristocrat and owner of a large estate in Hiiumaa, won the tender to erect a new building on Toompea hill in the middle of Tallinn (Reval). The architect for the new house was Johann Caspar Mohr, a provincial architect who was responsible for the maintenance of public buildings in Estonia and a popular designer of local manor houses.

The construction of the building started in 1787. Almost immediately, however, the Russian state ran low on funds as a result of expenditures in connection with the ongoing Russo-Turkish War. As a result, the province became indebted to Stenbock, and the unfinished building passed into his possession. He subsequently used it as his Tallinn residence, and the building still bears its name in his remembrance. In 1828, after Stenbock's death, the building passed between different owners until 1899, when it finally became the property of the Governorate administration, and finally began to be used as a courthouse.

During both the first period of independence of Estonia (1918–1940) and during the Soviet occupation (1944–1991) it continued to be used as a courthouse. The maintenance of the building was neglected in the 1970s and 1980s, when the ceilings of two courtrooms and the archive of the court collapsed. By the time of the restoration of Estonian independence in 1991, the entire building was at risk of collapsing. A complete renovation was carried out in 1996–2000. The newly renovated building became the official seat of the Estonian national government at its re-opening in 2000.

== Architecture ==
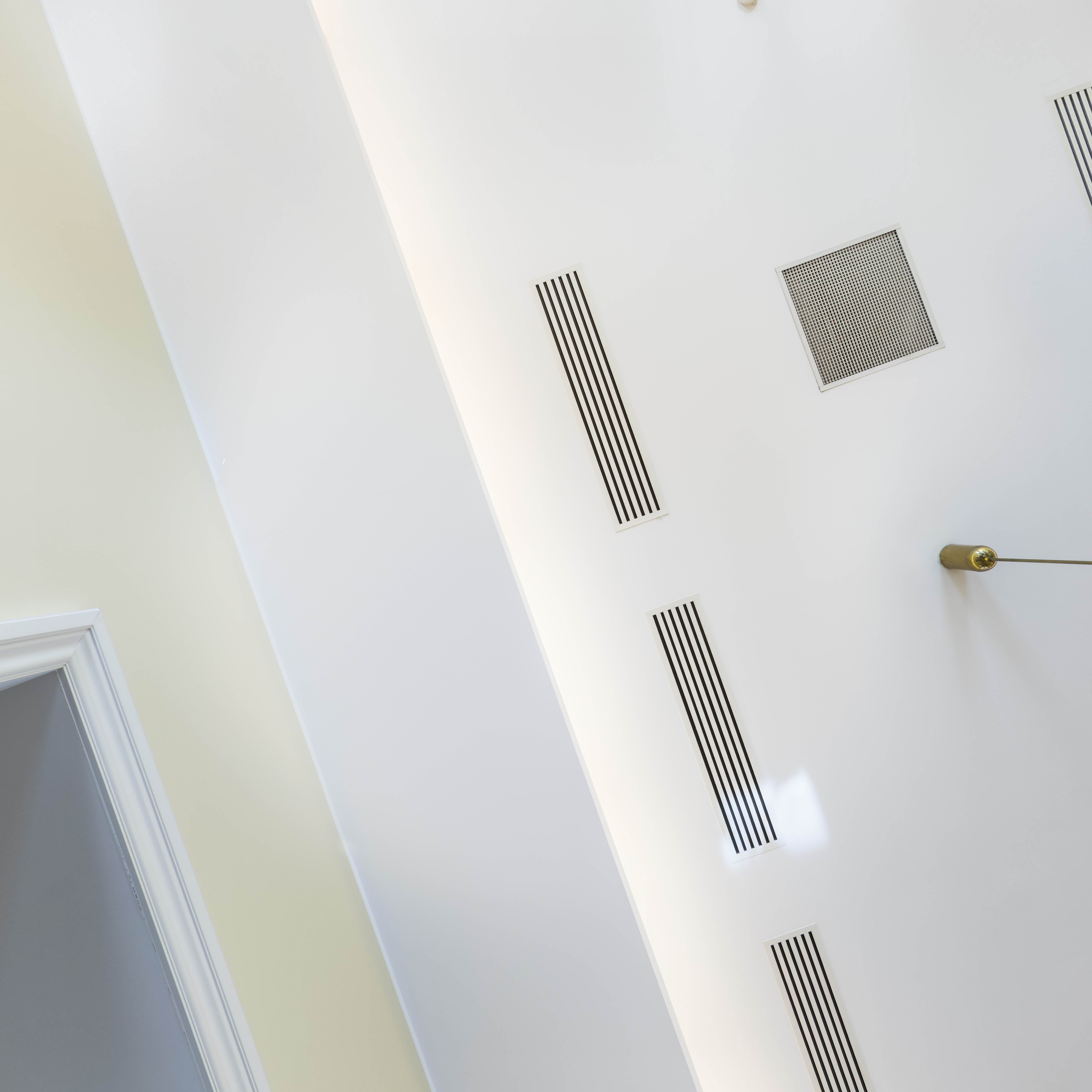
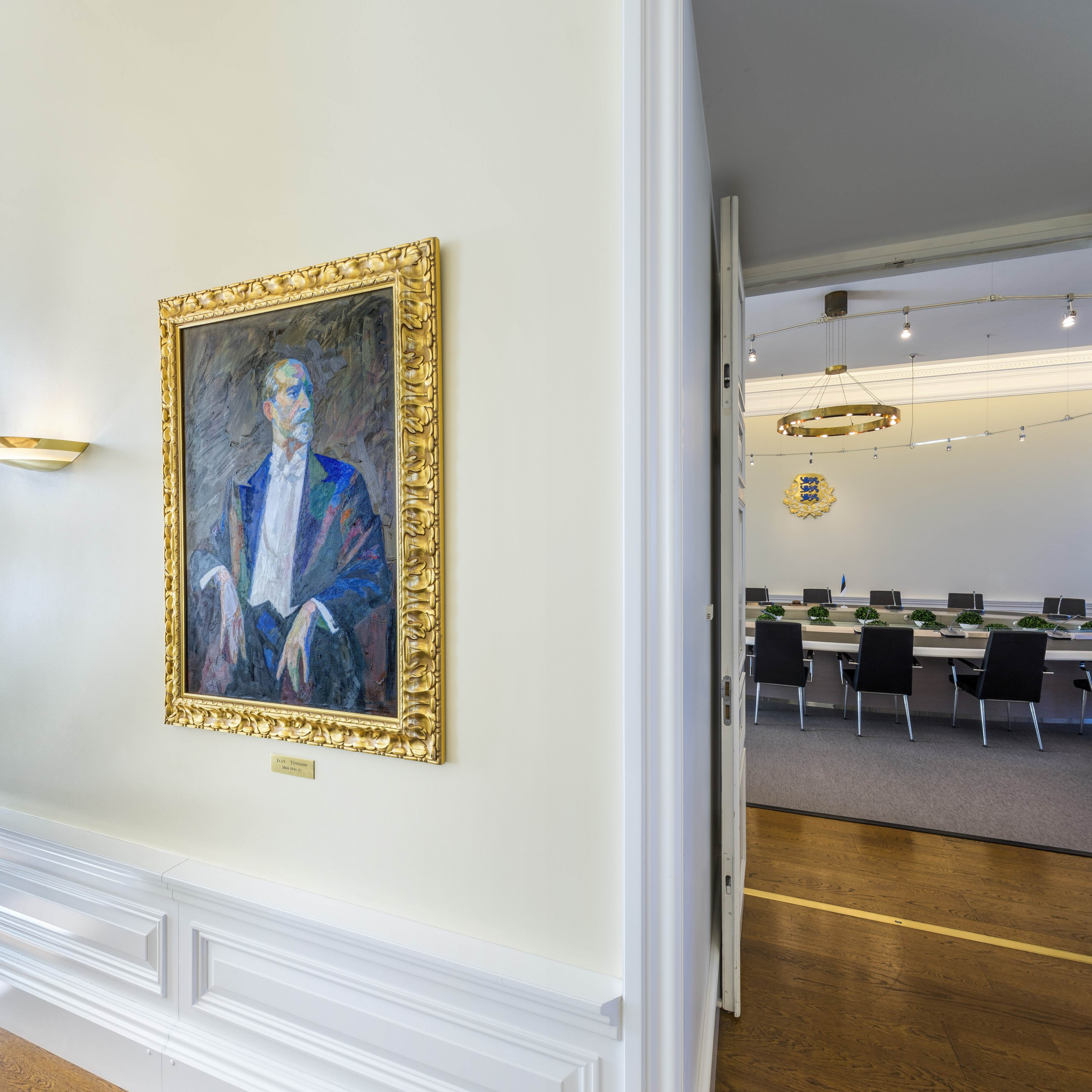
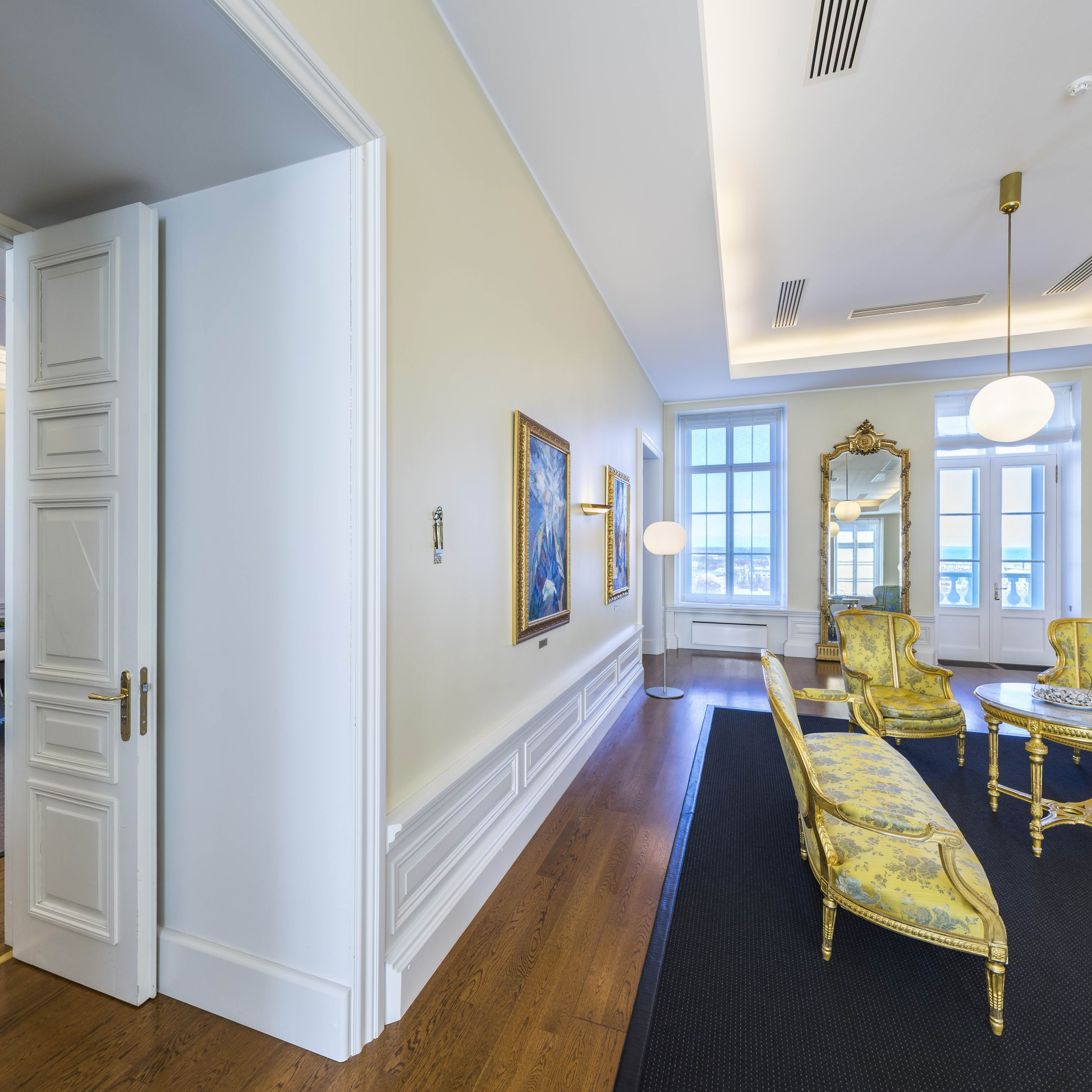
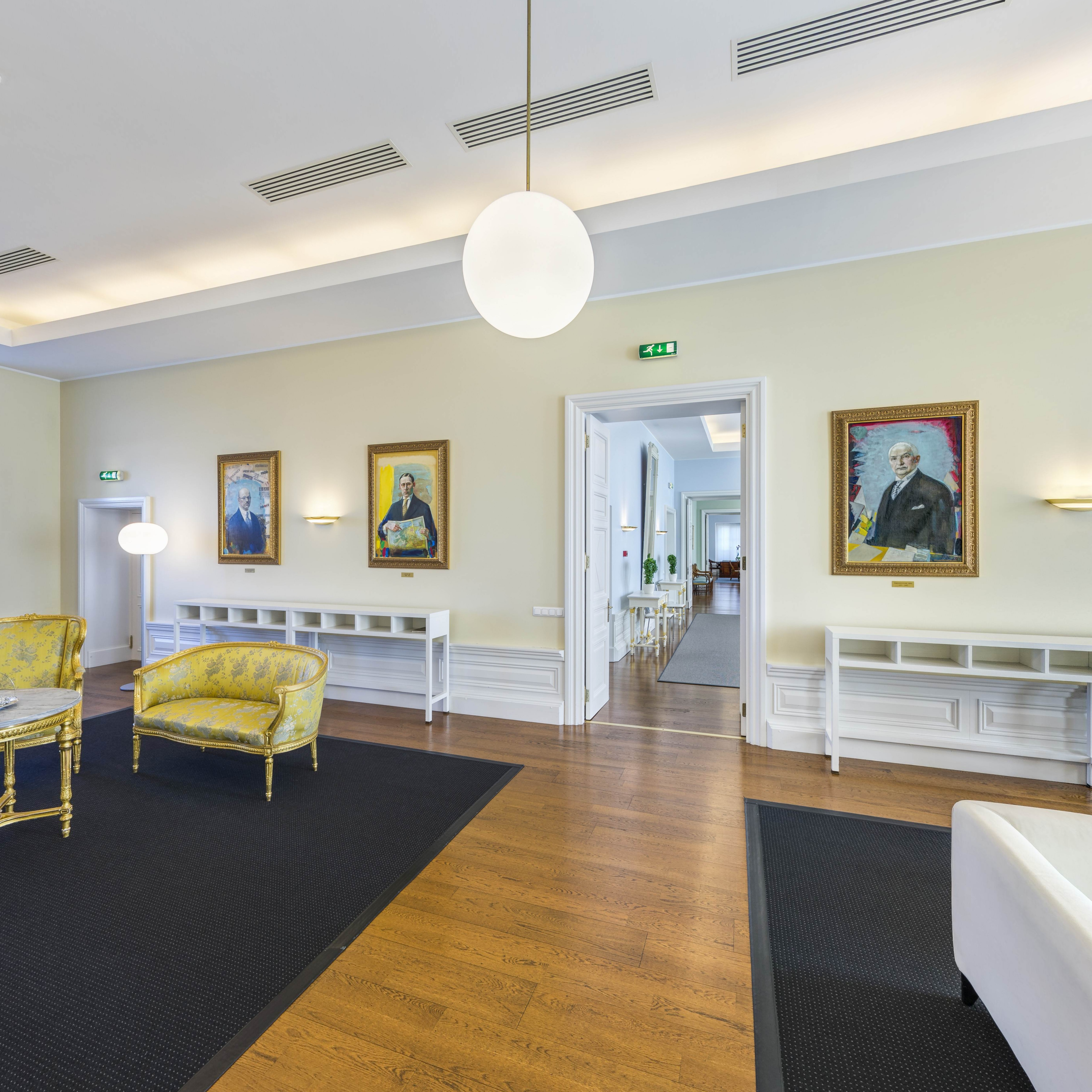
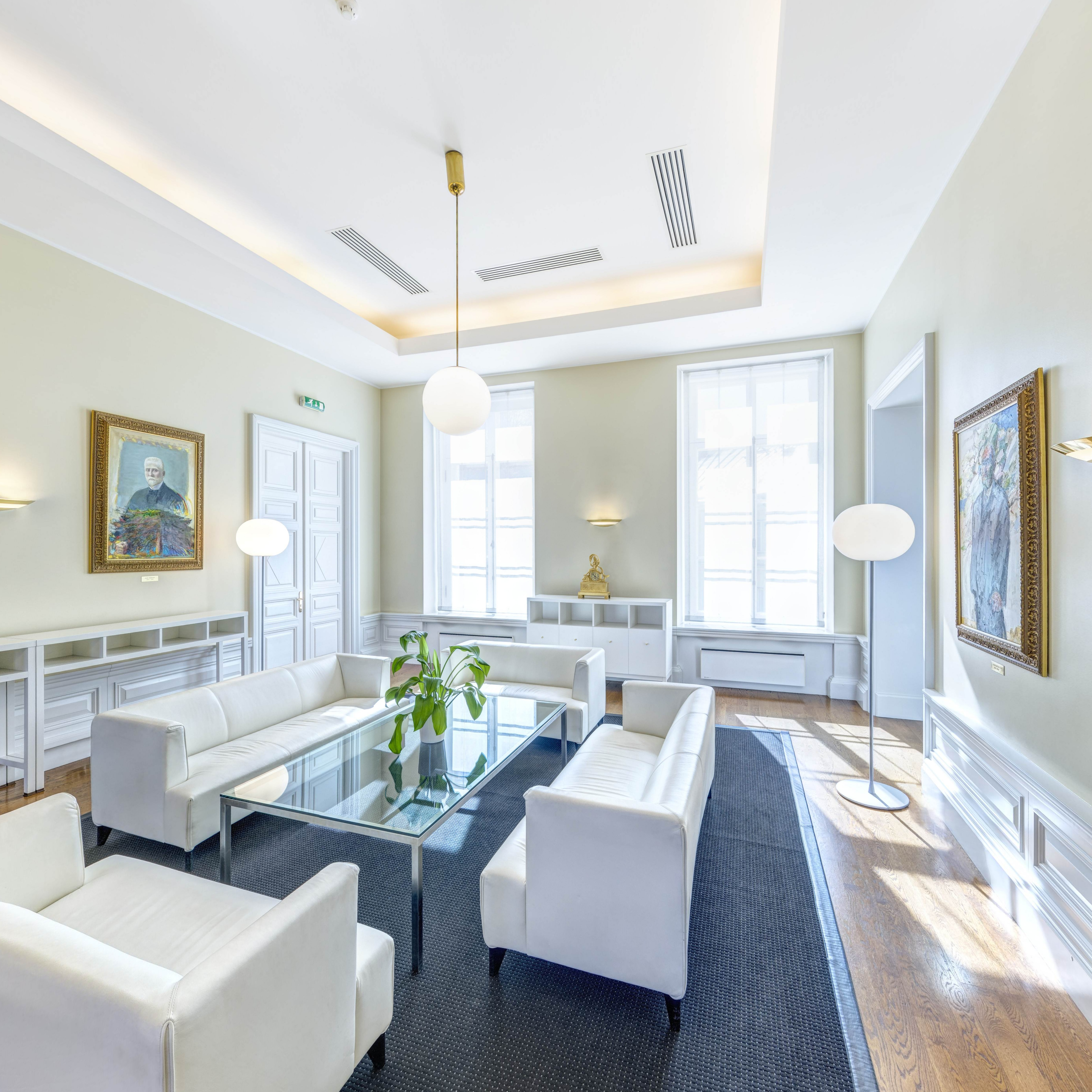
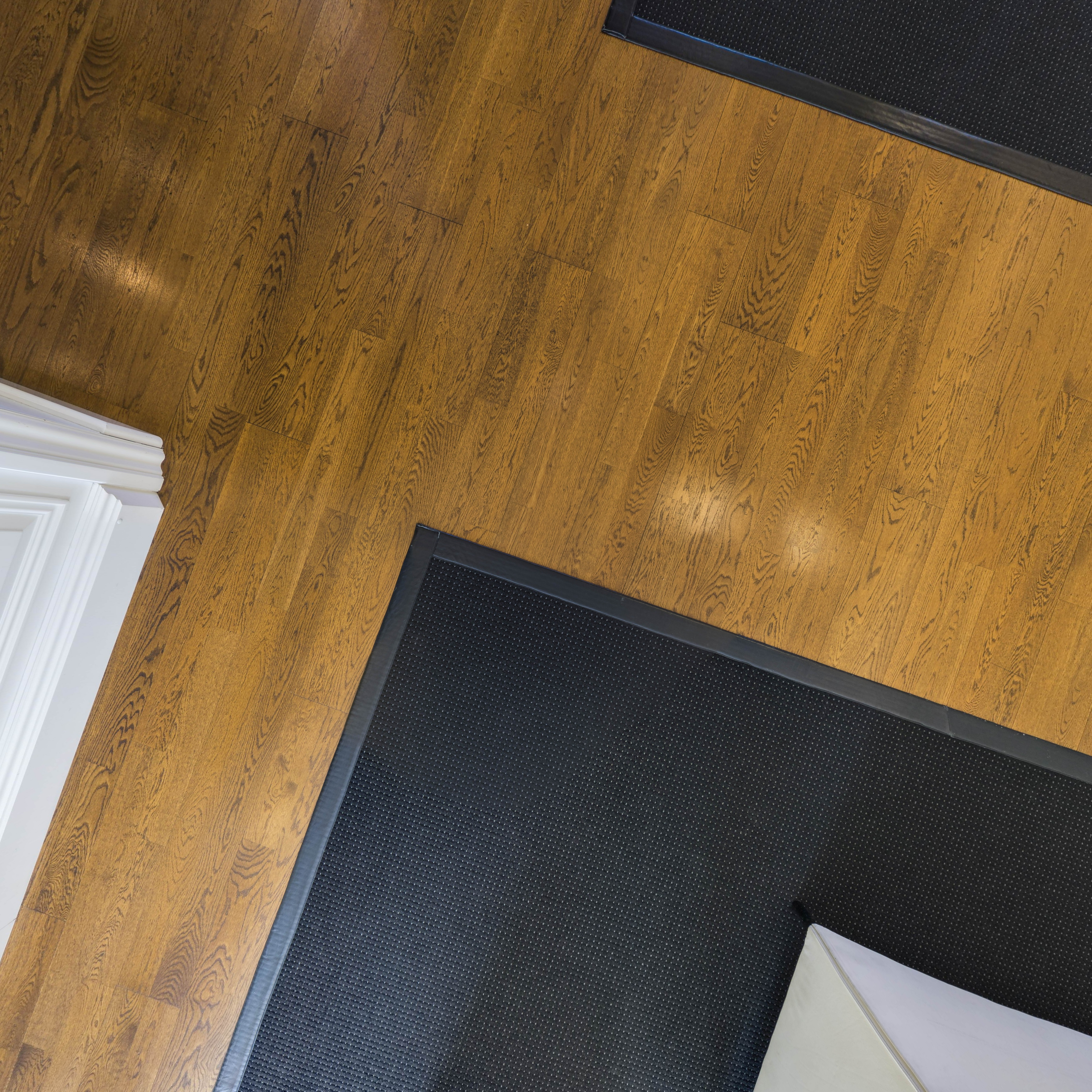
Hall of the Heads of State in Stenbock House

The architectural style of the building is a rather simple form of neo-classicism. The front façade is adorned by six pilasters and two semi-pilasters made of dolomite from Saaremaa and a dentiled pediment. It faces a semi-circular courtyard surrounded by less ornate outbuildings. The street front of the building is therefore characterised by the rather unassuming outbuildings. On the building wall facing the street, there is a memorial plaque with the names of Estonian members of parliament and government who were killed by the Stalinist Soviet occupation regime. The best-known view of the building (illustration) is of its back, which by its location at the edge of Toompea hill enjoys an unobstructed view of the sea. This face is dominated by a large balcony raised on Doric columns. All in all, the exterior of the building still more or less reflects the original edifice. The interior was severely damaged during the Soviet occupation, and it has now been reconstructed in large part.
