= Juhan Parts =

Estonian politician (born 1966)

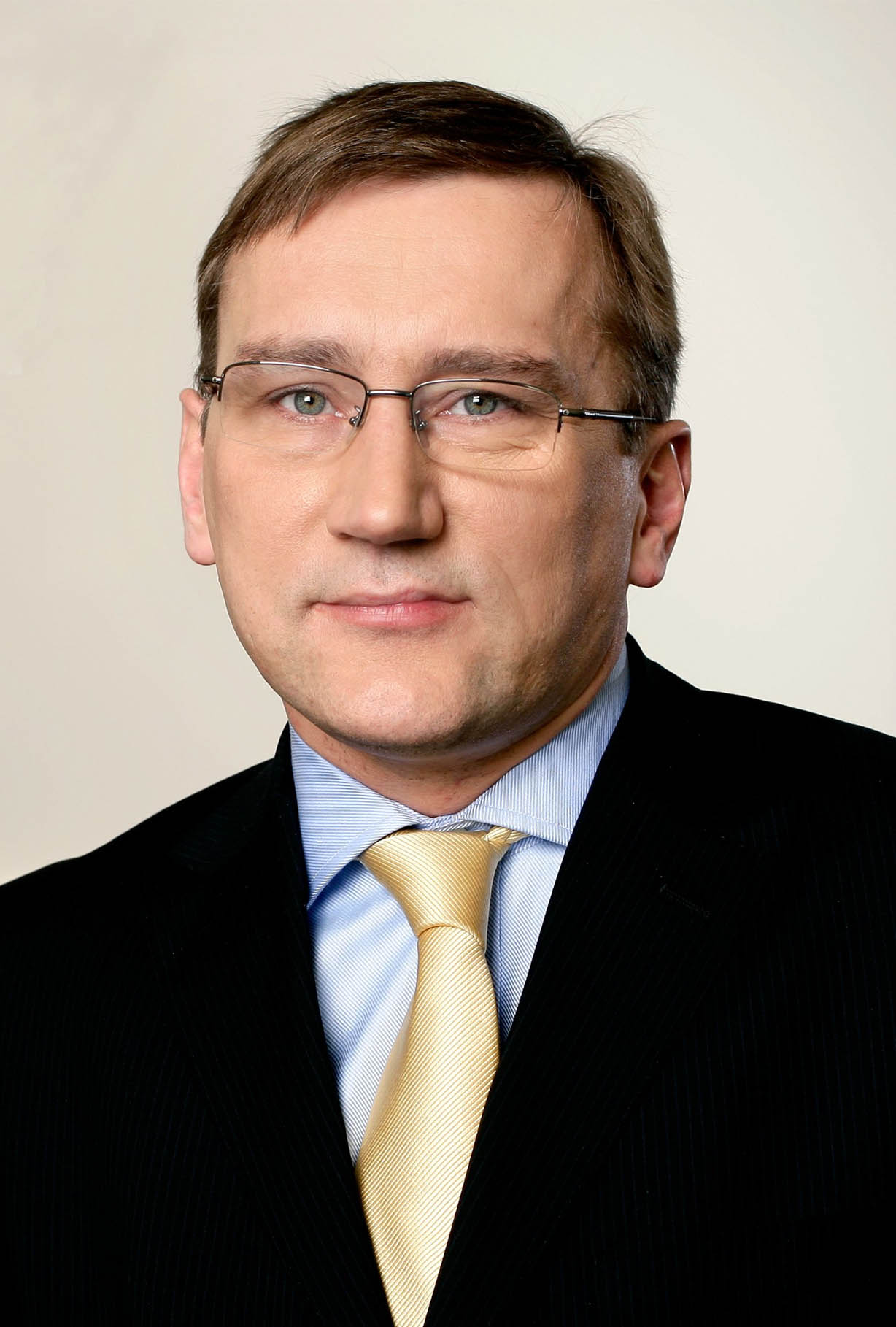
- Parts in 2012

Member of the European Court of Auditors for Estonia
- In office 1 January 2017 – 31 December 2022
- President: Klaus-Heiner Lehne; Tony Murphy
- Preceded by: Kersti Kaljulaid
- Succeeded by: Keit Pentus-Rosimannus

Prime Minister of Estonia
- In office 10 April 2003 – 12 April 2005
- President: Arnold Rüütel
- Preceded by: Siim Kallas
- Succeeded by: Andrus Ansip

Minister of Economic Affairs and Communications
- In office 5 April 2007 – 26 March 2014
- Prime Minister: Andrus Ansip
- Preceded by: Edgar Savisaar
- Succeeded by: Urve Palo (Economic Affairs and Infrastructure); Anne Sulling (Foreign Trade and Entrepreneurship)

Personal details
- Born: 27 August 1966 (age 60) Tallinn, then part of Estonian SSR, Soviet Union
- Party: Res Publica Party (2001–2006); Pro Patria and Res Publica Union (2006–present)
- Spouse(s): Merle Parts (1987); Daisy Tauk (2002–present)
- Children: 4
- Education: University of Tartu

Juhan Parts (Estonian pronunciation: [ˈjuhɑnʲ ˈpɑrtʲːːsʲ], born 27 August 1966) is an Estonian politician who was Prime Minister of Estonia from 2003 to 2005 and Minister of Economic Affairs and Communications from 2007 to 2014. Juhan Parts is a member of the Isamaa party.

== Education ==
Born in Tallinn, Juhan Parts completed Gustav Adolf Grammar School in Tallinn (then Tallinn Secondary School No. 1). Afterwards, he studied law at the University of Tartu in Tartu, Estonia.

== Early career ==
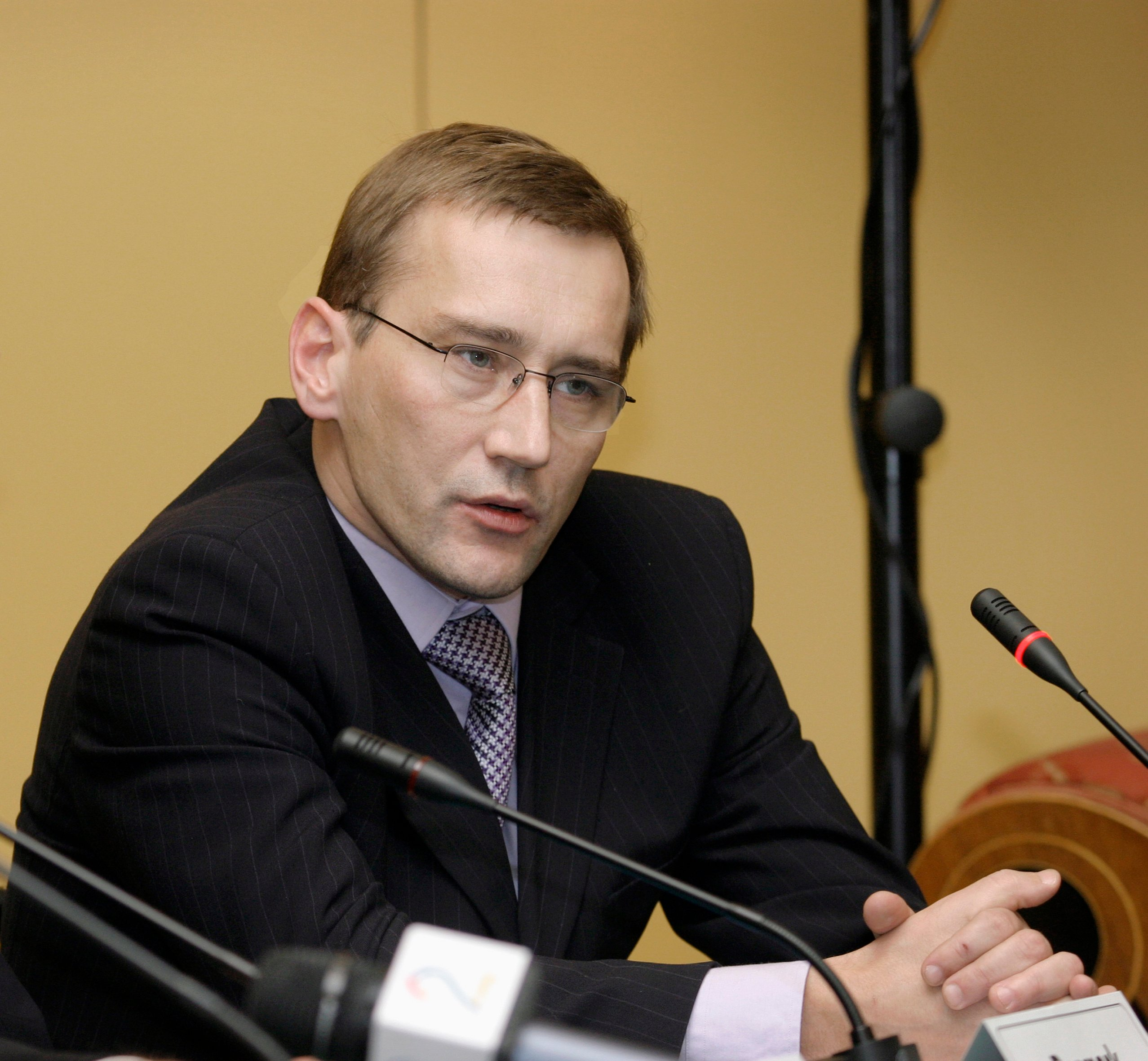
Juhan Parts

Juhan Parts began his career in law and public administration during Estonia’s post-Soviet transition, rising from the Ministry of Justice. He was appointed Auditor General of Estonia in 1998 and made a name for himself by pursuing government accountability and exposing misuse of government funds.

== Political career ==
Parts became the chairman of a new party, called Res Publica, which he was instrumental in starting. It is a largely technocratic party which can be described as an economically liberal party of young administrators. Res Publica is currently a member of the right-of-centre European People's Party.

=== Prime Minister of Estonia, 2003–2005 ===
In the Riigikogu (Estonian parliament) elections in 2003, Parts surprisingly gained a majority among the right-of-centre parties, and as a result, he was charged with forming a new government coalition and became Prime Minister of Estonia. The new government took office on 10 April 2003.

On 24 March 2005, Parts stepped down as prime minister after a vote of no confidence against Minister of Justice Ken-Marti Vaher had passed the Riigikogu. Vaher had established a quota system of how many civil servants had to be prosecuted every year (per county), which was seen as reminiscent of Stalinist purges by many Estonians, a measure that Parts had endorsed.

Parts' term as Prime Minister officially ended on 12 April 2005 when the Riigikogu confirmed his successor Andrus Ansip.

=== Minister for Economic Affairs, 2007–2014 ===
From 2007 until 2014, Parts served as Minister for Economic Affairs and Communications in the government of Prime Minister Andrus Ansip.

Early in his tenure, Parts unveiled a plan to boost Estonia's cyber security in response to the 2007 cyberattacks targeting websites of Estonian organizations, including Estonian parliament, banks, ministries, newspapers and broadcasters. Under his leadership, the Estonian government opened talks with SAS Group about the future of Estonian Air and did not rule out taking a majority stake in the carrier. Also during his time in office, Estonia and Finland signed a 2014 agreement on building two new liquefied natural gas (LNG) terminals on either side of the Gulf of Finland and a pipeline connecting the two countries.

After calling some members of the Lithuanian government "fools" in a 2014 interview with the Wall Street Journal about the joint Rail Baltic infrastructure project, Parts found himself under heavy fire in both countries.

In the 2015 parliamentary election, Parts was re-elected to the parliament with 4,208 individual votes.

== European Court of Auditors, 2017–2022 ==
In 2016, the Council of the European Union appointed Parts as a member of the European Court of Auditors.

Since taking office, Parts has been leading the Court's investigations into the performance of the European Anti-Fraud Office (2019), the European Union's 2014-2020 development spending in Kenya (2020) and the use of Instrument for Pre-Accession Assistance funds in the Western Balkans (2022).

Political offices
Preceded by Hindrek Meri	Auditor General of Estonia; 1998–2003	Succeeded by Mihkel Oviir
Preceded by Siim Kallas	Prime Minister of Estonia; 2003–2005	Succeeded by Andrus Ansip
Preceded by Edgar Savisaar	Minister of Economic Affairs and Communications; 2007–2014	Succeeded by Urve Palo, Anne Sulling
