= Agricultural Market Information System =

- AMIS logo
- Abbreviation: AMIS
- Established: 16 September 2011, in Rome, Italy
- Type: Inter-agency platform
- Headquarters: Rome, Italy
- Secretary: Abdolreza Abbassian (current)
- Website: www.amis-outlook.org

The Agricultural Market Information System (AMIS) is an inter-agency platform to enhance food market transparency and encourage international policy coordination in times of crisis. It was established at the request of the Group of Twenty (G20) in 2011. Countries participating in AMIS encompass the main producing and consuming countries of major food crops covered by the initiative: wheat, maize, rice and soybeans. AMIS is hosted by the Food and Agriculture Organization of the United Nations (FAO) in Rome/Italy and supported by a joint Secretariat, which currently (September 2016) consists of eleven international organizations and entities. Apart from FAO, these are the Group on Earth Observations Global Agricultural Monitoring (GEOGLAM) initiative, the International Fund for Agricultural Development (IFAD), the International Food Policy Research Institute (IFPRI), the International Grains Council (IGC), the Organisation for Economic Co-operation and Development (OECD), the World Food Programme (WFP), the World Trade Organization (WTO), the United Nations Conference on Trade and Development (UNCTAD), the United Nations High-Level Task Force on the Global Food Security Crisis (UN-HLTF), and the World Bank.

== Background ==
AMIS was created as a tool to address excessive food price volatility and to strengthen global food security in a period of heightened insecurity in international food markets. Its creation is thus intrinsically linked to the two consecutive price hikes that occurred in 2007/08 and 2010.

After the 2007-08 world food price crisis led to social unrest in a number of countries and drastically worsened the food security situation, the world experienced another food price shock in the summer of 2010 when the Russian Federation announced an export ban on wheat in response to a severe drought and wildfires that threatened much of the country's crop.

Under the auspices of its Intergovernmental Groups on Grains and Rice, FAO invited all its members to Rome for an extraordinary meeting in September 2010 to discuss the troubled market conditions and to stimulate a coordinated response. While the event failed to yield any immediate results, it can be credited for triggering constructive discussions that eventually led to the creation of AMIS. The meeting acknowledged that unexpected price hikes and volatility were “amongst major threats to food security and that their root causes need to be addressed.” In particular it recognized “the lack of reliable and up-to-date information on crop supply and demand and export availability” as well as “insufficient market transparency at all levels including in relation to futures markets” among the main drivers of the most recent disturbances in world food markets. It further emphasized the need “to enhance market information and transparency”, calling for improved “monitoring of planting intentions, crop development and domestic market information.”

These ideas were taken up during the G20 Summit in Seoul in November 2010, which asked a number of international institutions to identify the best ways to manage and mitigate risks of food price volatility without distorting markets. The ensuing report was presented to the French Presidency of the G20 in June 2011, concluding with a list of ten recommendations, among which to establish AMIS. In the final declaration of the G20 Summit in Cannes, heads of state and government of the G20 countries stressed the importance of improving "market information and transparency in order to make international markets for agricultural commodities more effective." In order to address these challenges, they decided to launch AMIS that was officially inaugurated in September 2011.

== Participating countries ==
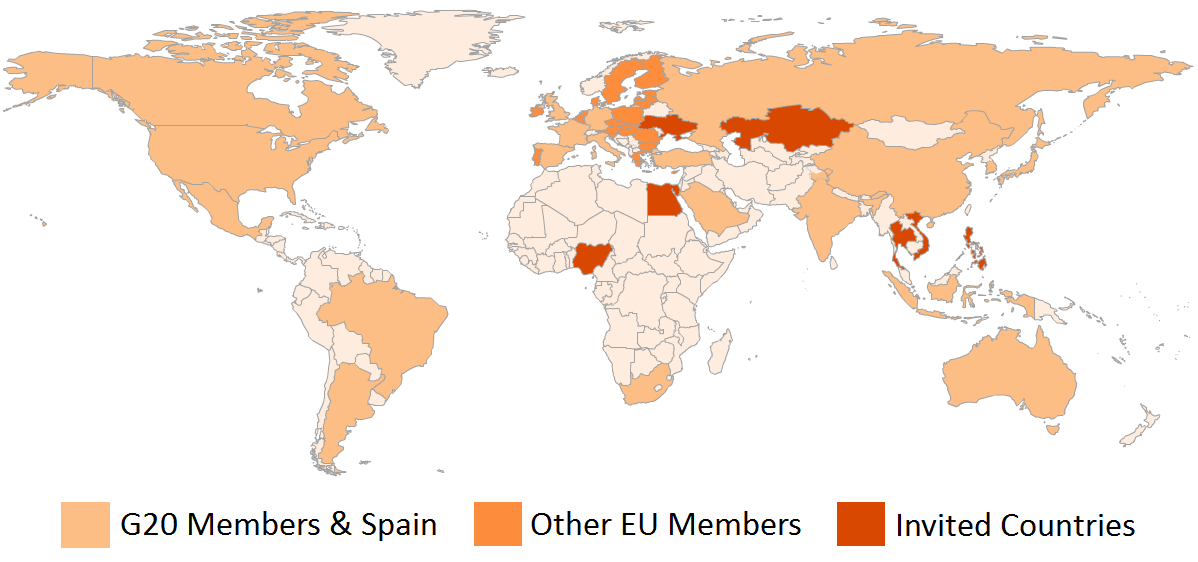
AMIS participating countries

Participants in AMIS include G20 countries plus Spain and eight additional major exporting and importing countries of the AMIS crops. These are: Bangladesh, Egypt, Kazakhstan, Nigeria, the Philippines, Thailand, Ukraine, and Vietnam. G20 members are Argentina, Australia, Brazil, Canada, China, European Union, France, Germany, India, Indonesia, Italy, Korea, Japan, Mexico, Russian Federation, Saudi Arabia, South Africa, Turkey, United Kingdom, and the United States.

== Objectives ==
According to the Terms of Reference that established AMIS, the following objectives are central:

- Improve agricultural market information, analysis and short-term supply and demand forecasts at both national and international levels.
- Collect and analyze policy information affecting global commodity markets, and promote international policy dialogue and coordination.
- Report on critical conditions of international food markets, including structural weaknesses, and strengthen global early warning capacity on these movements.
- Build data collection capacity in participating countries by promoting best practices and improved methodologies, providing training to national stakeholders and facilitating the exchange of lessons learned among participating countries.

== Structure ==
AMIS consists of three main bodies:

1. The Global Food Market Information Group provides and assesses market and policy information. It unites technical representatives from participating countries who meet twice per year.
2. The Rapid Response Forum promotes early discussion among decision-level officials about critical conditions in international food markets, and encourages the coordination of policies. It is composed of senior officials from participating countries who meet once per year, as well as when the market situation warrants international policy action.
3. The Secretariat produces short-term market outlooks, assessments and analyses, and supports all functions of the Forum and the Information Group. It is governed by a steering committee that includes one representative from each of the ten member organizations, namely: FAO, IFAD, IFPRI, IGC, OECD, WFP, WTO, UNCTAD, UN-HLTF, and the World Bank.

== See also ==
- Agricultural marketing
- Market information systems
