= List of G20 summits =

The following list of G20 summits summarizes all G20 conferences held at various different levels: summits of heads of state or heads of government, ministerial-level meetings, Engagement Group meetings and others.

== Summits of state leaders ==
G20 Summits: The G20 Summits are the highest level of meetings, where heads of state or government from member countries come together to discuss key global issues. These summits usually take place annually and are hosted by different member countries. They provide an opportunity for leaders to engage in high-level discussions, negotiate agreements, and set priorities for international cooperation.

Host cities of G20 summits

	Date	Host country	Host city	Venue	Host leader	Ref.
1st	14–15 November 2008	United States	Washington, D.C.	National Building Museum	George W. Bush	
2nd	2 April 2009	United Kingdom	London	ExCeL London	Gordon Brown	
3rd	24–25 September 2009	United States	Pittsburgh	David L. Lawrence Convention Center	Barack Obama	
4th	26–27 June 2010	Canada	Toronto	Metro Toronto Convention Centre	Stephen Harper	
5th	11–12 November 2010	South Korea	Seoul	COEX Convention & Exhibition Center	Lee Myung-bak	
6th	3–4 November 2011	France	Cannes	Palais des Festivals	Nicolas Sarkozy	
7th	18–19 June 2012	Mexico	San José del Cabo	Los Cabos International Convention Center	Felipe Calderón	
8th	5–6 September 2013	Russia	Strelna (Saint Petersburg)	Constantine Palace	Vladimir Putin	
9th	15–16 November 2014	Australia	Brisbane	Brisbane Convention & Exhibition Centre	Tony Abbott	
10th	15–16 November 2015	Turkey	Belek (Serik)	Regnum Carya Hotel Convention Centre	Recep Tayyip Erdoğan	
11th	4–5 September 2016	China	Hangzhou	Hangzhou International Exhibition Centre	Xi Jinping	
12th	7–8 July 2017	Germany	Hamburg	Hamburg Messe	Angela Merkel	
13th	30 November – 1 December 2018	Argentina	Buenos Aires	Costa Salguero Center	Mauricio Macri	
14th	28–29 June 2019	Japan	Osaka	Intex Osaka	Shinzō Abe	
15th	21–22 November 2020	Saudi Arabia	Riyadh	(The summit took place via a worldwide video conference due to the COVID-19 pandemic.)	King Salman	
16th	30–31 October 2021	Italy	Rome	EUR Convention Center	Mario Draghi	
17th	15–16 November 2022	Indonesia	Nusa Dua (Benoa)	The Apurva Kempinski Bali	Joko Widodo	
18th	9–10 September 2023	India	New Delhi	Bharat Mandapam	Narendra Modi	
19th	18–19 November 2024	Brazil	Rio de Janeiro	Museum of Modern Art	Luiz Inácio Lula da Silva	
20th	22–23 November 2025	South Africa	Johannesburg	Nasrec	Cyril Ramaphosa	
21st	14–15 December 2026	United States	Miami	Trump National Doral Miami	Donald Trump	
22nd	27–28 November 2027	United Kingdom	Manchester	Manchester Central	Andy Burnham	
23rd	2028	South Korea			Lee Jae Myung	

== Ministerial-level meetings ==
In addition to the summits, the G20 holds ministerial-level meetings on specific topics such as finance, trade, agriculture, affordable and accessible healthcare, pharma, tech series, technology advancements, health, and energy. These meetings involve ministers or high-level representatives from member countries who deliberate on policy matters, share experiences, and explore opportunities for collaboration majorly G20 finance and economy ministers, and central bank governors lead the meetings.

Locations in bold text indicate the meeting was concurrent with a G20 summit. Ministerial meetings are not always held in the summit host's country.

=== Finance Track meetings ===
The G20 Finance Track includes meetings of finance ministers and central bank governors from member countries. They discuss global economic and financial issues, review the progress of ongoing initiatives, and coordinate policies to foster economic stability and growth.

Year	Host country	Host city	Dates	Notes
1999	Germany	Berlin		
2000	Canada	Montreal		
2001	Canada	Ottawa/Gatineau		
2002	India	New Delhi		
2003	Mexico	Morelia		
2004	Germany	Berlin		
2005	China	Beijing		
2006	Australia	Melbourne		Main article: 2006 G20 ministerial meeting
2007	South Africa	Cape Town		
2008	Brazil	São Paulo		
2009	United Kingdom	Horsham	March	
2009	United Kingdom	London	September	
2009	United Kingdom	St Andrews	November	
2010	Republic of Korea	Incheon	February	
2010	Canada	Toronto	June	
2010	South Korea	Seoul	November	
2011	France	Paris	February	
2011	United States	Washington, D.C.	April	
2011	United States	Washington, D.C.	September	As part of the annual meeting of the IMF and World Bank
2011	France	Paris	October	
2011	France	Cannes	November	
2012	Mexico	Mexico City	February	
2012	United States	Washington, D.C.	April	
2012	Mexico	Mexico City	November	
2013	Russia	Moscow	February	
2013	United States	Washington, D.C.	April	Part of the annual meeting of the IMF and World Bank
2013	United States	Washington, D.C.	October	Continuation of the meeting mentioned above
2014	Australia	Sydney	February	
2014	United States	Washington, D.C.	April	
2014	Australia	Cairns	September	
2015	Turkey	Istanbul	9–10 February	
2016	China	Hangzhou	July	
2017	Germany	Baden-Baden	March	
2018	Argentina	Buenos Aires	19–20 March	
2018	United States	Washington, D.C.	20 April	
2018	Argentina	Buenos Aires	21–22 July	
2018	Indonesia	Bali	11 October	
2018	Argentina	Buenos Aires	November	
2019	Japan	Fukuoka	8–9 June	
2020	Saudi Arabia	Riyadh	21–22 November	
2021	Italy	Venice	9–10 July	
2022	Indonesia	Bali	16–17 July	
2023	India	Gandhinagar	17–18 July	
2024	Brazil	Rio de Janeiro	25–26 July	
2025	South Africa	Cape Town	26–27 February	
2025	United States	Washington, D.C.	23–24 April	
2025	South Africa	Zimbali, KwaZulu-Natal	14–18 July	
2025	United States	Washington, D.C.	15–16 October	

== Working Group meetings ==
G20 Working Groups are specialized task forces that focus on specific areas of interest. They work on policy development, research, and coordination to support the discussions and decisions made at higher-level meetings. These groups bring together experts and officials to exchange knowledge and develop practical recommendations.

=== Foreign ministers ===
Year	Host country	Host city	Dates	Notes
2017	Germany	Bonn	February	
2018	Argentina	Buenos Aires	May	
2019	Japan	Nagoya	22–23 November	
2020	Saudi Arabia	Riyadh	21–22 November	
2021	Italy	Matera	29–30 June	
2022	Indonesia	Bali	7–8 July	
2023	India	Delhi	1–2 March	
2024	Brazil	Rio de Janeiro	21–22 February	
2025	South Africa	Nasrec	20–21 February	

=== Trade ministers ===
Year	Host country	Host city	Dates	Notes
2012	Mexico	Puerto Vallarta	18–20 April	
2013	(not held)			
2014	Australia	Sydney	19 July	
2015	Turkey	Istanbul	6 October	
2016	China	Shanghai	9–10 July	
2017	(not held)			
2018	Argentina	Mar del Plata	14 September	
2019	Japan	Tsukuba	8–9 June	
2020	(Replaced by an extraordinary summit, via video conference, due to COVID-19 pandemic)			
2021	Italy	Sorrento	12 October	
2022	Indonesia	Bali	22–23 September	
2023	(not held)			
2024	Brazil	Brasília	24 October	
2025	South Africa	Gqeberha	10 October	

=== Labour and Employment ministers ===
Year	Host country	Host city	Dates	Notes
2010	United States	Washington, D.C.		
2011	France	Paris		
2012	Mexico	Guadalajara		
2013	Russia	Moscow		
2014	Australia	Melbourne		
2015	Turkey	Ankara		
2016	China	Beijing		
2017	Germany	Bad Neuenahr-Ahrweiler		
2018	Argentina	Mendoza		
2019	Japan	Matsuyama	1–2 September	
2020	Saudi Arabia	Riyadh		
2021	Italy	Catania	22–23 June	
2022	Indonesia	Bali	14 September	
2023	India	Indore		
2024	Brazil	Fortaleza	25–26 July	
2025	South Africa	George	30–31 July	

== Pre-conference meetings ==
G20 engagement groups and pre-conferences are meetings with various stakeholders. These groups make policy recommendations to G20 leaders and help shape the summit agenda.

Sherpas are senior officials who represent their respective countries and play a crucial role in preparing the agenda and negotiating outcomes for G20 meetings. Sherpa meetings allow for in-depth discussions on technical and policy matters before they are presented at higher-level meetings.

== Engagement Group meetings ==
There are up to 13 engagement groups around presidency of G20 in every year. They usually include non-(vice)ministerial officers, company and non-governmental organization leaders, coordinate with Finance Track participants.

=== B20 summits ===
Business 20 (B20) summits are summits of business leaders from the G20 countries.

Year	Host country	Host city	Dates	Notes
2010	Canada	Toronto		
2011	(not held)			
2012	Mexico	Los Cabos		
2013	Russia	Saint Petersburg		
2014	Australia	Sydney		
2015	Turkey	unspecified		
2016	China	Hangzhou		
2017	Germany	Berlin		
2018	Argentina	Buenos Aires		
2019	Japan	Tokyo		
2020	Saudi Arabia	Riyadh		
2021	Italy	Rome		
2022	Indonesia	Bali		
2023	India	New Delhi		
2024	Brazil	Rio de Janeiro		
2025	South Africa	Johannesburg	18–20 November	

=== C20 summits ===
Civil 20 (C20) summits are summits of civil society delegates from the G20 countries.

Year	Host country	Host city	Dates	Notes
2014	Australia	Melbourne		
2015	Turkey	Istanbul		
2016	(not held)			
2017	Germany	Hamburg		
2018	Argentina	Buenos Aires		
2019	Japan	Tokyo		
2020	Saudi Arabia	Riyadh		
2021	Italy	Rome		
2022	Indonesia	Bali		
2023	India	Leh, Thiruvananthapuram, Kochi, Pune, Jaipur		
2024	Brazil	Recife		
2025	South Africa	Ekurhuleni	12–14 November	

=== J20 summits ===
Judiciary 20 (J20) summits are summits to gather the supreme and constitutional courts of the G20 countries.

- 2018: Argentina
- 2024: Brazil
- 2025: (South Africa) unspecified

=== L20 summits ===
Labour 20 (L20) summits are summits of labour and employment leaders from the G20 countries. It's coordinated by the International Trade Union Confederation (ITUC).

Year	Host country	Host city	Dates	Notes
2008	United States	Washington		
2009	United Kingdom	London		
2009	United States	Pittsburgh		
2010	Canada	Toronto		
2010	South Korea	Seoul		
2011	France	Paris		
2012	Mexico	Los Cabos		
2013	Russia	Moscow		
2014	Australia	Brisbane		
2015	Turkey	Antalya		
2016	China	Beijing		
2017	Germany	Berlin		
2018	Argentina	Mendoza		
2019	Japan	Tokyo		
2020	Saudi Arabia	Riyadh		
2021	Italy	Rome		
2022	Indonesia	Bali		
2023	India	Amritsar, Kolkata, Raipur, Nagpur, Bhopal, Guwahati, Mumbai, Srinagar, Kochi Thiruvananthapuram, Dhanbad, Lucknow, Patna, Pune, Indore, New Delhi		
2024	Brazil	Brasília		
2025	South Africa	George	28–29 July	

=== O20 summits ===
Ocean 20 (O20) summits are summits to discuss the ocean agenda with the civil society of the G20 countries.

Year	Host country	Host city	Dates	Notes
2024	Brazil			
2025	South Africa	Mbombela	28–30 May	

=== P20 summits ===
Parliament 20 (P20) Engagement Group, started during Canada's Presidency in 2010, is led by Speakers from Parliaments of G20 countries.

Year	Host country	Host city	Dates	Notes
2010	Canada			
2011	South Korea			
2012	Saudi Arabia			
2013	Mexico			
2014–2018	(not held)			
2019	Japan			
2020	(cancelled due to COVID-19 pandemic)			
2021	Italy			
2022	Indonesia			
2023	India			
2024	Brazil			
2025	South Africa	Cape Town	3 October	

=== S20 summits ===
Science 20 (S20) meetings and summits draw together academics and civil society delegates from the G20 countries.

Year	Host country	Host city	Dates	Notes
2017	Germany			
2018	Argentina			
2019	Japan			
2020	Saudi Arabia			
2021	Italy			
2022	Indonesia			
2023	India			
2024	Brazil			
2025	South Africa	Pretoria	24–25 April	

=== SAI20 summits ===
Supreme Audit Institutions 20 (SAI20) is an Engagement Group introduced by the Indonesian Presidency in 2022. It is a forum to discuss the important role played by SAIs globally in ensuring transparency and accountability, and in promoting cooperation among the G20 members.

Year	Host country	Host city	Dates	Notes
2022	Indonesia			
2023	India			
2024	Brazil			
2025	South Africa	Johannesburg	24–25 June	

=== SU20 summits ===
Startup 20 (SU20) Engagement Group has been initiated under G20 India presidency of 2023 which aspires to create a global narrative for supporting startups and enabling synergies between startups, corporates, investors, innovation agencies and other key ecosystem stakeholders.

Year	Host country	Host city	Dates	Notes
2023	India			
2024	Brazil			
2025	South Africa	(Virtual)	27 May	

=== T20 summits ===
Think tank 20 (T20) summits are summits of think tanks from the G20 countries.

Year	Host country	Host city	Dates	Notes
2012	Mexico	Mexico City		
2013	Russia	Moscow		
2014-2016	(not held)			
2017	Germany	Berlin		
2018	Argentina	Buenos Aires		
2019	Japan	Tokyo		
2020	Saudi Arabia	Riyadh		
2021	Italy	Milan		
2022	Indonesia	Bali		
2023	India	New Delhi; Bengaluru; Mumbai; Bhopal; and Pune.::.		
2024	Brazil	Brasília; São Paulo; and Rio de Janeiro.::.		
2025	South Africa	(Cape town; Durban; Johannesburg; And Pretoria).::.		

=== U20 summits ===
Urban 20 (U20) summits are summits of cities from the G20 countries.

Year	Host country	Host city	Dates	Notes
2018	Argentina	Buenos Aires		
2019	Japan	Tokyo		
2020	Saudi Arabia	Riyadh		
2021	Italy	Rome and Milan		
2022	Indonesia	Jakarta		
2023	India	Ahmedabad		
2024	Brazil	Rio de Janeiro and São Paulo		
2025	South Africa	Tshwane	10–12 June	
2025	South Africa	(to be announced)	12–14 September	

=== W20 summits ===
First Women 20 (W20) summit organized by German Chancellor Angela Merkel.

Year	Host country	Host city	Dates	Notes
2017	Germany	Berlin		
2018	Argentina	Buenos Aires		
2019	Japan	Tokyo		
2020	Saudi Arabia	Riyadh		
2021	Italy	Rome		
2022	Indonesia	Balige, Lake Toba		
2023	India	Aurangabad		
2024	Brazil	unspecified		
2025	South Africa	Cape Town	21–23 May	

=== Y20 summits ===
Youth 20 (Y20) summits are summits of young leaders and changemakers from 18 to 30 years old from the G20 countries.

Year	Host country	Host city	Dates	Notes
2010	Canada	Vancouver		
2011	France	Paris		
2012	Mexico	Puebla		
2013	Russia	Saint Petersburg		
2014	Australia	Sydney		
2015	Turkey	Istanbul		
2016	China	Beijing and Shanghai		
2017	Germany	Berlin		
2018	Argentina	Córdoba		
2019	Japan	Tokyo		
2020	Saudi Arabia	Riyadh		
2021	Italy	Milan and Bergamo		
2022	Indonesia	Jakarta and Bandung		
2023	India	Varanasi		
2024	Brazil	Brasília		
2025	South Africa	Johannesburg	15–18 June	
2025	South Africa	Johannesburg	18–22 August	
2026	United States	Washington DC		

== See also ==
- List of G7 summits
- BRICS § Summits
- Shanghai Cooperation Organisation § List of summits
