= 2011 G20 Cannes summit =

Sixth meeting of the G20 heads of government

G20 Summit on Financial Markets and the World Economy Sommet du G20 2011 6th G20 summit
- *03–06 November 2011
- Host country: France.::.
- Motto: Building our Common Future: Renewed Collective Action for the Benefit of All
- Cities: Lyon & Marseille
- Venues: Palais des Festivals
- Participants: G20; Invited Guests:Belgium; Haiti; Portugal; Philippines; Singapore; Spain; & United Arab Emirates.::. Invited Organizations: AU; NEPAD, CCASG
- Chair: Nicolas Sarkozy

The sixth meeting of the G20 heads of government/heads of state, was held in Cannes, France, from 3 to 6 November 2011. The topics of discussions were financial markets and the world economy.

The G20 forum is the avenue for the G20 economies to discuss, plan and monitor international economic cooperation. While the summit achieved little progress on resolving the Eurozone crisis and providing concrete measures to addressing global financial imbalances, it did produce some tangible results, including the adoption of the Cannes Action Plan for Growth and Jobs, the launch of the Agricultural Market Information System (AMIS) and the endorsement of an Action Plan on Food Price Volatility and Agriculture.

== Priorities ==
France put agriculture and food security at the heart of the G20 priorities. Around this broad theme, it divided the priorities of the Summit into six areas:

1. Reform the International Monetary System.
2. Strengthen financial regulation, especially in non-banking financial institutions as well as regulation concerning financial market integrity and transparency.
3. Reduce excessive commodity price volatility and enhance food security.
4. Support employment and strengthen the social dimension of globalization.
5. Fight corruption, for example by ensuring that the Anti-Corruption Action Plan adopted in the 2010 G20 Seoul summit will produce concrete results and real progress starting in 2011.
6. Support infrastructure development and enhance food security in the most vulnerable countries.

== Outcomes ==
The Summit took place in the aftermath of the 2008 financial crisis and in the midst of the evolving Euro area crisis. Against this background, the outcomes of the Summit can be considered as insufficient in providing clear solutions for restoring and strengthening the global economy.

However, the Summit did result in a number of initiatives, most notably in the area of agriculture and food security. Especially the launch of the Agricultural Market Information System (AMIS) and the endorsement of an Action Plan on Food Price Volatility and Agriculture are tangible steps to addressing the world agriculture and food challenge. The G20 Summit also tasked the GEO Global Agricultural Monitoring (GEOGLAM) initiative to produce and disseminate improved forecasts of agricultural production through the use of earth observations.

== Attendance ==
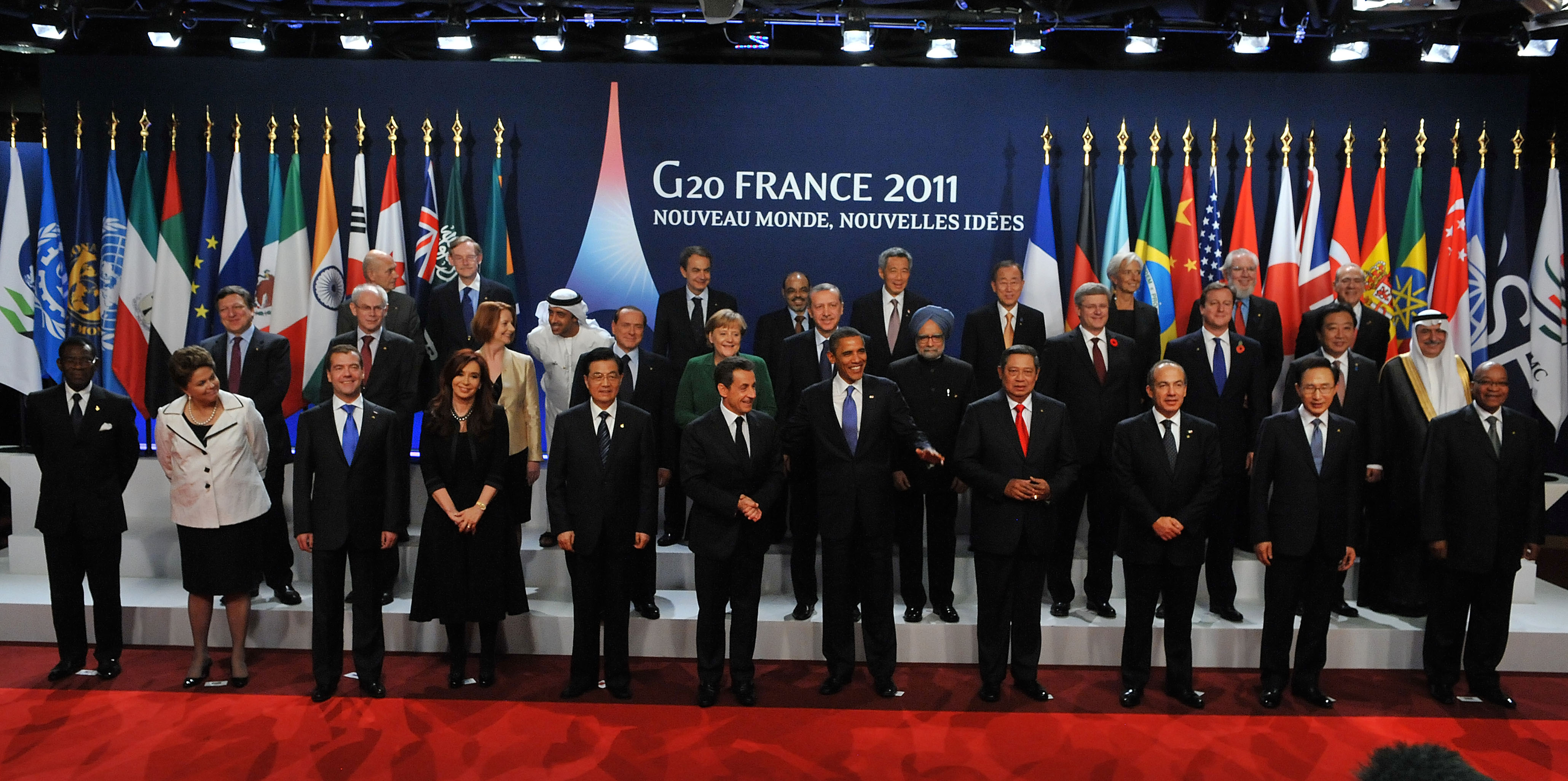
Leaders of the G20 countries present at the Cannes summit.

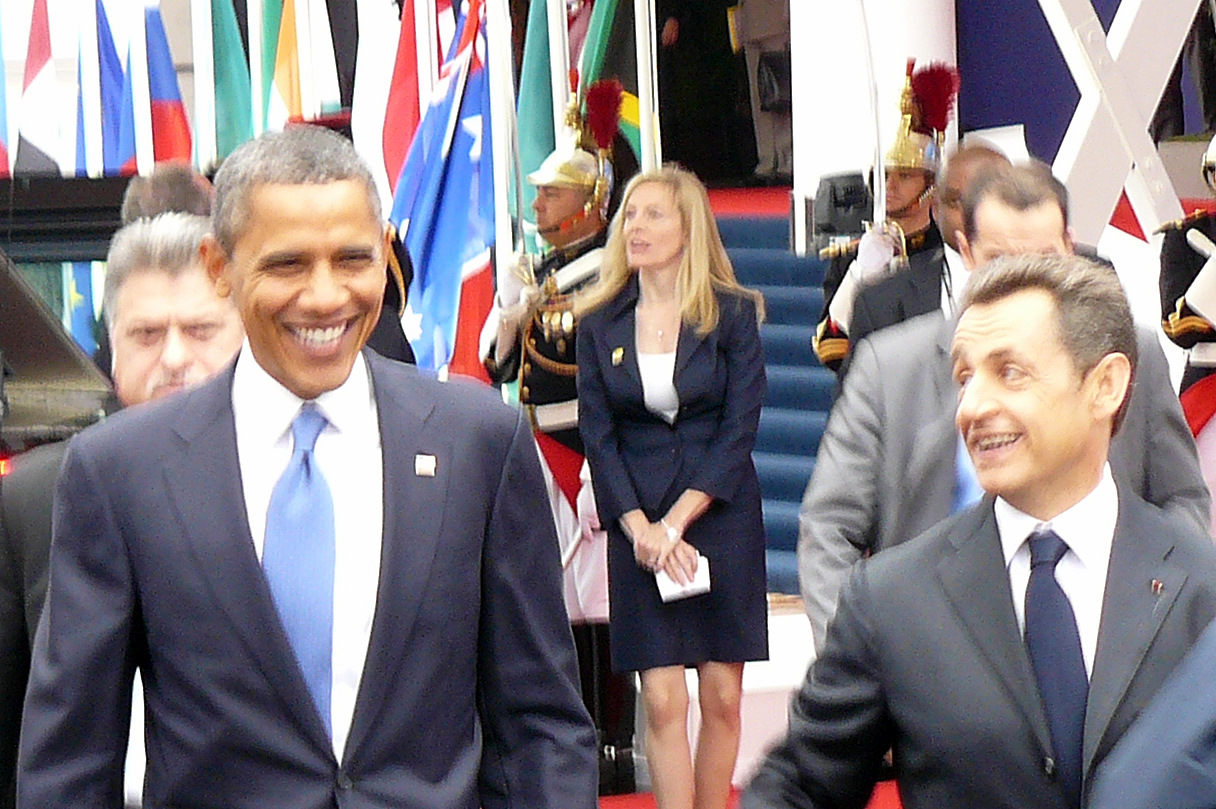
Nicolas Sarkozy welcomes Barack Obama to the G20 meeting in Cannes, France, on 3 November.

Attendance at the Cannes summit included leaders and representatives of the core members of the G20, which comprises 19 countries and the European Union which is represented by its two governing bodies, the European Council and the European Commission. Representatives of other nations and regional organizations were also invited to take part in the summit.

State		Represented by	Title
(Argentina)	Argentina	Cristina Fernández de Kirchner	President
(Australia)	Australia	Julia Gillard	Prime Minister
(Brazil)	Brazil	Dilma Rousseff	President
(Canada)	Canada	Stephen Harper	Prime Minister
(China)	China	Hu Jintao	President
(France)	France	Nicolas Sarkozy	President
(Germany)	Germany	Angela Merkel	Chancellor
(India)	India	Manmohan Singh	Prime Minister
(Indonesia)	Indonesia	Susilo Bambang Yudhoyono	President and the chair of ASEAN
(Italy)	Italy	Silvio Berlusconi	Prime Minister
(Japan)	Japan	Yoshihiko Noda	Prime Minister
(Mexico)	Mexico	Felipe Calderón	President
(Russia)	Russia	Dmitry Medvedev	President
(Saudi Arabia)	Saudi Arabia	Ibrahim Abdulaziz Al-Assaf	Minister of Finance
(South Africa)	South Africa	Jacob Zuma	President
(South Korea)	South Korea	Lee Myung-bak	President
(Turkey)	Turkey	Recep Tayyip Erdoğan	Prime Minister
(United Kingdom)	United Kingdom	David Cameron	Prime Minister
(United States)	United States	Barack Obama	President
(European Union)	European Commission	José Manuel Barroso -- projected co-leader of delegation	President
(European Union)	European Council	Herman Van Rompuy	President
Invited states
State		Represented by	Title
(Equatorial Guinea)	Equatorial Guinea	Teodoro Obiang Nguema Mbasogo -- projected leader of delegation	President
(Ethiopia)	Ethiopia	Meles Zenawi -- projected leader of delegation	Prime Minister
(Singapore)	Singapore	Lee Hsien Loong -- projected leader of delegation	Prime Minister
(Spain)	Spain	José Luis Rodríguez Zapatero -- projected leader of delegation	Prime Minister
(United Arab Emirates)	United Arab Emirates	Sheikh Abdullah bin Zayed Al Nahyan	Minister of Foreign Affairs
International organisations
Organisation		Represented by	Title
	African Union	Teodoro Obiang Nguema Mbasogo	Chairman
	Basel Committee on Banking Supervision	Nout Wellink -- projected leader of delegation	Chairman
	CCASG	Sheikh Abdullah bin Zayed Al Nahyan -- projected leader of delegation	
	European Central Bank	Mario Draghi	President
	Financial Stability Board	Mark Carney	Chairman
	Global Governance Group (3-G)	Sellapan Ramanathan -- projected leader of delegation	
	International Labour Organization	Juan Somavía -- projected leader of delegation	Director-General
	International Monetary Fund	Christine Lagarde/	Managing Director
	NEPAD	Armando Guebuza -- projected leader of delegation	
	OECD	José Ángel Gurría -- projected leader of delegation	Secretary-General
(United Nations)	United Nations	Ban Ki-moon	Secretary General
	World Bank Group	Robert Zoellick -- projected leader of delegation	President
	World Trade Organization	Pascal Lamy -- projected leader of delegation	Director-General

== Protests ==
At the summit protesters donned Robin Hood caps and demanded a tax on international financial transactions in order to provide aid to poor countries instead of catering to banking and other financial institutions. They also chanted slogans in opposition to "corporate greed" and supported a counter-G20 summit, "People First, Not Finance", organised by labour unions and NGOs such as Greenpeace and Oxfam. Though police reported 5,500 were part of the protests, the organisers estimated the number of protesters at 12,000. The riot police and helicopters limited the scope of the protests to a neighbourhood in the east of Nice, which was to host the alternative summit as well as the protests. Both Cannes and Nice also tightened security, with 12,000 police personnel being deployed.

== See also ==
- 37th G8 summit
