= G20 =

Intergovernmental forum

- Group of Twenty
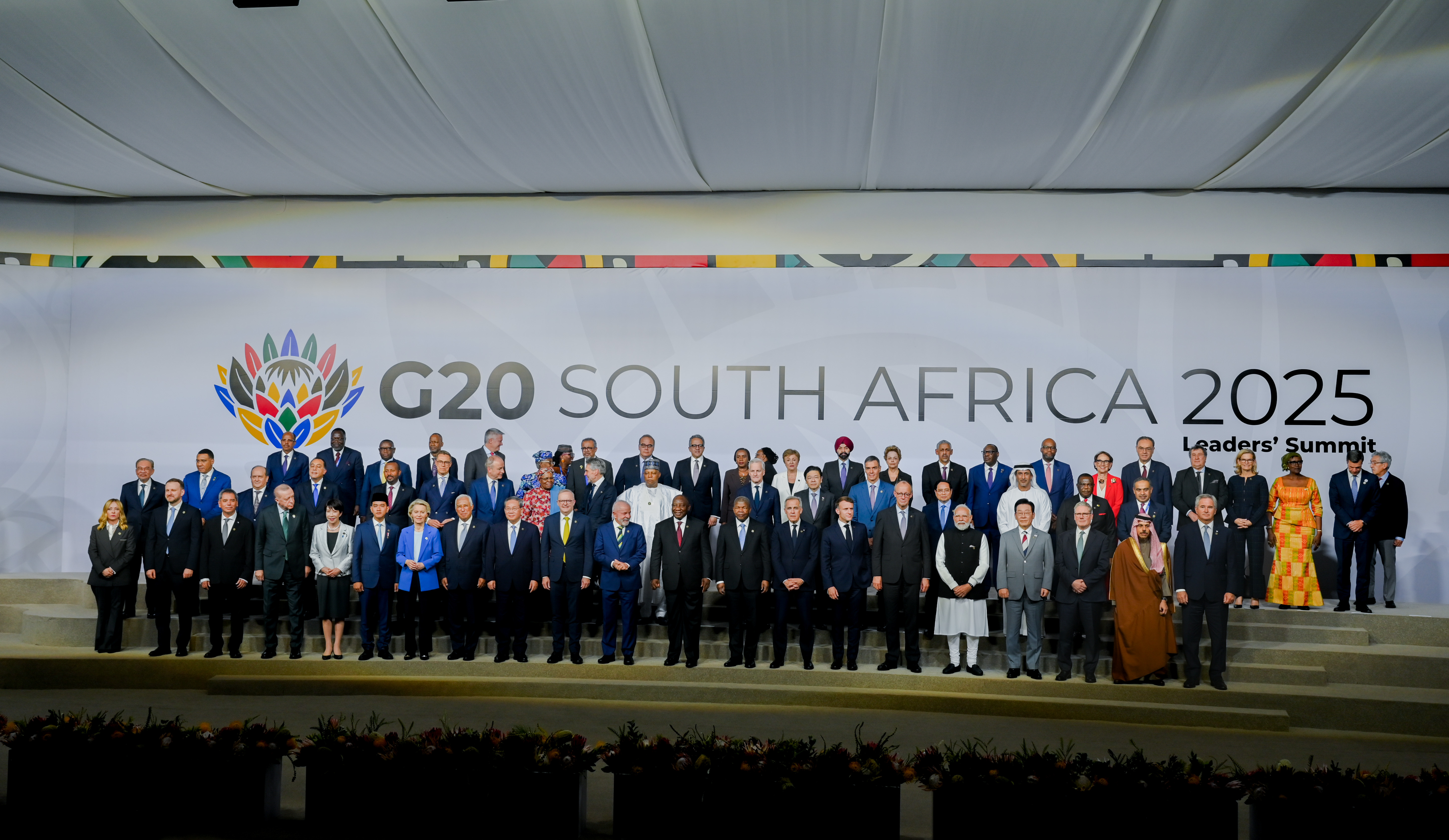
- Group photo at the 2025 G20 Johannesburg summit in Johannesburg, South Africa

- Member countries of the G20 Countries represented through membership of the European Union Countries represented through membership of the African Union Countries invited (Spain)
- Formation: 26 September 1999 (27 years ago)
- Type: International organization
- Purpose: Bring together systemically important industrialized and developing economies to discuss key issues in the global economy.
- Members: 21 members (Note: 19 countries, the European Union (EU) and African Union (AU)): Argentina; Australia; Brazil; Canada; China; France; Germany; India; Indonesia; Italy; Japan; Mexico; Russia; Saudi Arabia; South Africa; South Korea; Turkey; United Kingdom; United States; African Union; European Union
- Chairman (incumbent): Donald Trump, President of the United States
- Website: g20.org

The Group of 20 (G20) is an intergovernmental forum comprising 19 sovereign countries, the European Union (EU), and the African Union (AU). It works to address major issues related to the global economy, such as international financial stability, climate change mitigation and sustainable development, through annual meetings of heads of state and heads of government.

The 19 member states of the G20 account for around 85% of gross world product (GWP), 75% of international trade, 56% of the global population, and 60% of the world's land area; including the EU and AU, the G20 comprises 78.9% of global population and 83.9% of global CO_{2} emissions from fossil energy.

The G20 was founded in 1999 in response to several world economic crises. Since 2008, it has convened at least once a year, with summits involving each member's head of government or state, finance minister, or foreign minister, and other high-ranking officials; the EU is represented by the European Commission and the European Central Bank. (Note: Summits were biannual in 2009 and 2010; since the November 2011 Cannes summit, G20 summits have been annual.) Other countries, international organizations, and nongovernmental organizations are invited to attend the summits, some permanently. The African Union joined as the 21st member at the 2023 summit in India and was officially represented at the 2024 summit in Brazil.

In its 2009 summit, the G20 declared itself the primary venue for international economic and financial cooperation. The group's stature has risen during the subsequent decade, and it is recognised by analysts as exercising considerable global influence; it is also criticised for its limited membership, lack of enforcement powers, and for the alleged undermining of existing international institutions. Summits are often met with protests, particularly by anti-globalization groups.

== History ==
The G20 is the latest in a series of post–World War II initiatives aimed at international coordination of economic policy, which include institutions such as the "Bretton Woods twins", the International Monetary Fund and the World Bank, and what is now the World Trade Organization.

The G20 was foreshadowed at the Cologne summit of the G7 in June 1999, and formally established at the G7 Finance Ministers' meeting on 26 September 1999 with an inaugural meeting on 15–16 December 1999 in Berlin. Canadian finance minister Paul Martin was chosen as the first chairman and German finance minister Hans Eichel hosted the meeting.

A 2004 report by Colin I. Bradford and Johannes F. Linn of the Brookings Institution asserted the group was founded primarily at the initiative of Eichel, the concurrent chair of the G7. However, Bradford later described then-Finance Minister of Canada (and future Prime Minister of Canada) Paul Martin as "the crucial architect of the formation of the G20 at finance minister level", and as the one who later "proposed that the G20 countries move to leaders level summits". Canadian academic and journalistic sources have also identified the G20 as a project initiated by Martin and his American counterpart then-Treasury Secretary Larry Summers. All acknowledge, however, that Germany and the United States played a key role in bringing their vision into reality.

Martin and Summers conceived of the G20 in response to the series of massive debt crises that had spread across emerging markets in the late 1990s, beginning with the Mexican peso crisis and followed by the 1997 Asian financial crisis, the 1998 Russian financial crisis, and eventually impacting the United States, most prominently in the form of the collapse of the prominent hedge fund Long-Term Capital Management in the autumn of 1998. It illustrated to them that in a rapidly globalizing world, the G7, G8, and the Bretton Woods system would be unable to provide financial stability, and they conceived of a new, broader permanent group of major world economies that would give a voice and new responsibilities in providing it.

The G20 membership was decided by Eichel's deputy Caio Koch-Weser and Summers's deputy Timothy Geithner. According to the political economist Robert Wade:

"Geithner and Koch-Weser went down the list of countries saying, Canada in, Portugal out, South Africa in, Nigeria and Egypt out, and so on; they sent their list to the other G7 finance ministries; and the invitations to the first meeting went out."

=== Early topics ===
The G20's primary focus has been governance of the global economy. Summit themes have varied from year to year. The theme of the 2006 G20 ministerial meeting was "Building and Sustaining Prosperity". The issues discussed included domestic reforms to achieve "sustained growth", global energy and resource commodity markets, reform of the World Bank and IMF, and the impact of demographic changes.

In 2007, South Africa hosted the secretariat with Trevor A. Manuel, South African Minister of Finance as chairperson of the G20.

In 2008, Guido Mantega, Brazil's Minister of Finance, was the G20 chairman and proposed dialogue on competition in financial markets, clean energy, economic development and fiscal elements of growth and development.

On 11 October 2008 after a meeting of G8 finance ministers, US President George W. Bush stated that the next meeting of the G20 would be important in finding solutions to the burgeoning economic crisis of 2008.

== Summits ==
Host cities of G20 summit

The Summit of G20 Finance Ministers and Central Bank Governors, who prepare the leaders' summit and implement their decisions, was created as a response both to the 2008 financial crisis and to a growing recognition that key emerging powers were not adequately included in the core of global economic discussion and governance. Additionally, G20 summits of heads of state or government were held.

After the 2008 debut summit in Washington, DC, G20 leaders met twice a year: in London and Pittsburgh in 2009, and in Toronto and Seoul in 2010.

Since 2011, when France chaired and hosted the G20, the summits have been held only once a year. The 2016 summit was held in Hangzhou, China, the 2017 summit was held in Hamburg, Germany, the 2018 summit was held in Buenos Aires, Argentina, the 2019 summit was held in Osaka, Japan, the 2020 summit was scheduled in Riyadh, Saudi Arabia but it was held virtually due to COVID-19, the 2021 summit was held in Rome, Italy, the 2022 summit was held in Bali, Indonesia, the 2023 summit was held in New Delhi, India, the 2024 summit was held in Rio de Janeiro, Brazil, and the 2025 summit was held in Johannesburg, South Africa. The 2026 summit will be held in Miami in the United States, and the 2027 event will travel to Manchester, UK.

Several other ministerial-level G20 meetings have been held since 2010. Agriculture ministerial meetings were conducted in 2011 and 2012; meetings of foreign ministers were held in 2012 and 2013; trade ministers met in 2012 and 2014, and employment ministerial meetings have taken place annually since 2010.

In 2012, the G20 Ministers of Tourism and Heads of Delegation of G20 member countries and other invited States, as well as representatives from the World Travel and Tourism Council (WTTC), World Tourism Organization (UNWTO) and other organisations in the Travel & Tourism sector met in Mérida, Mexico, on May 16 at the 4th G20 meeting and focused on 'Tourism as a means to Job Creation'. As a result of this meeting and The World Travel & Tourism Council's Visa Impact Research, later on the Leaders of the G20, convened in Los Cabos on 18–19 June, would recognise the impact of Travel & Tourism for the first time. That year, the G20 Leaders Declaration added the following statement: "We recognise the role of travel and tourism as a vehicle for job creation, economic growth and development, and, while recognizing the sovereign right of States to control the entry of foreign nationals, we will work towards developing travel facilitation initiatives in support of job creation, quality work, poverty reduction and global growth."

In March 2014, the former Australian foreign minister Julie Bishop, when Australia was hosting the 2014 G20 summit in Brisbane, proposed to ban Russia from the summit over its annexation of Ukrainian Crimea. The BRICS foreign ministers subsequently reminded Bishop that "the custodianship of the G20 belongs to all Member States equally and no one Member State can unilaterally determine its nature and character."

The 2015 G20 Summit in Antalya, Turkey, focused on "Inclusiveness, Investment, and Implementation," gathering leaders to address global economic challenges, development, climate change, and urgent issues like terrorism and refugees. Key outcomes included the Antalya Action Plan and commitments to financial stability, tax regulation, and energy policy.

In 2016, the G20 framed its commitment to the 2030 Agenda, Sustainable Development Goals in three key themes; the promotion of strong sustainable and balanced growth; protection of the planet from degradation; and furthering co-operation with low-income and developing countries. At the G20 Summit in Hangzhou, members agreed on an action plan and issued a high level principles document to member countries to help facilitate the agenda's implementation.

In 2020 during the COVID-19 pandemic, Saudi Arabia held the Presidency and, in advance of the Summit, convened an extraordinary meeting of the heads of state online in March 2020, which served as an important political gathering to coordinate an international response to COVID-19. The 2020 summit set for Saudi Arabia later that year was instead held virtually on 21–22 November 2020 due to the COVID-19 pandemic. 2021 G20 Rome summit which was held in Rome, the capital city of Italy, on 30–31 October 2021.

Indonesia held the 2022 summit in November 2022. During its presidency, Indonesia focused on the global COVID-19 pandemic and how to collectively overcome the challenges related to it. The three priorities of Indonesia's G20 presidency were global health architecture, digital transformations, and sustainable energy transitions. The G20 Presidency of Indonesia, in partnership with the Pandemic Fund secretariat, also officially launched the Pandemic Fund at a high-level event. The Pandemic Fund expected to be as a key part of the solution for reducing risks from epidemics and pandemics in the most vulnerable parts of the world and contributing to a healthier and safer world .

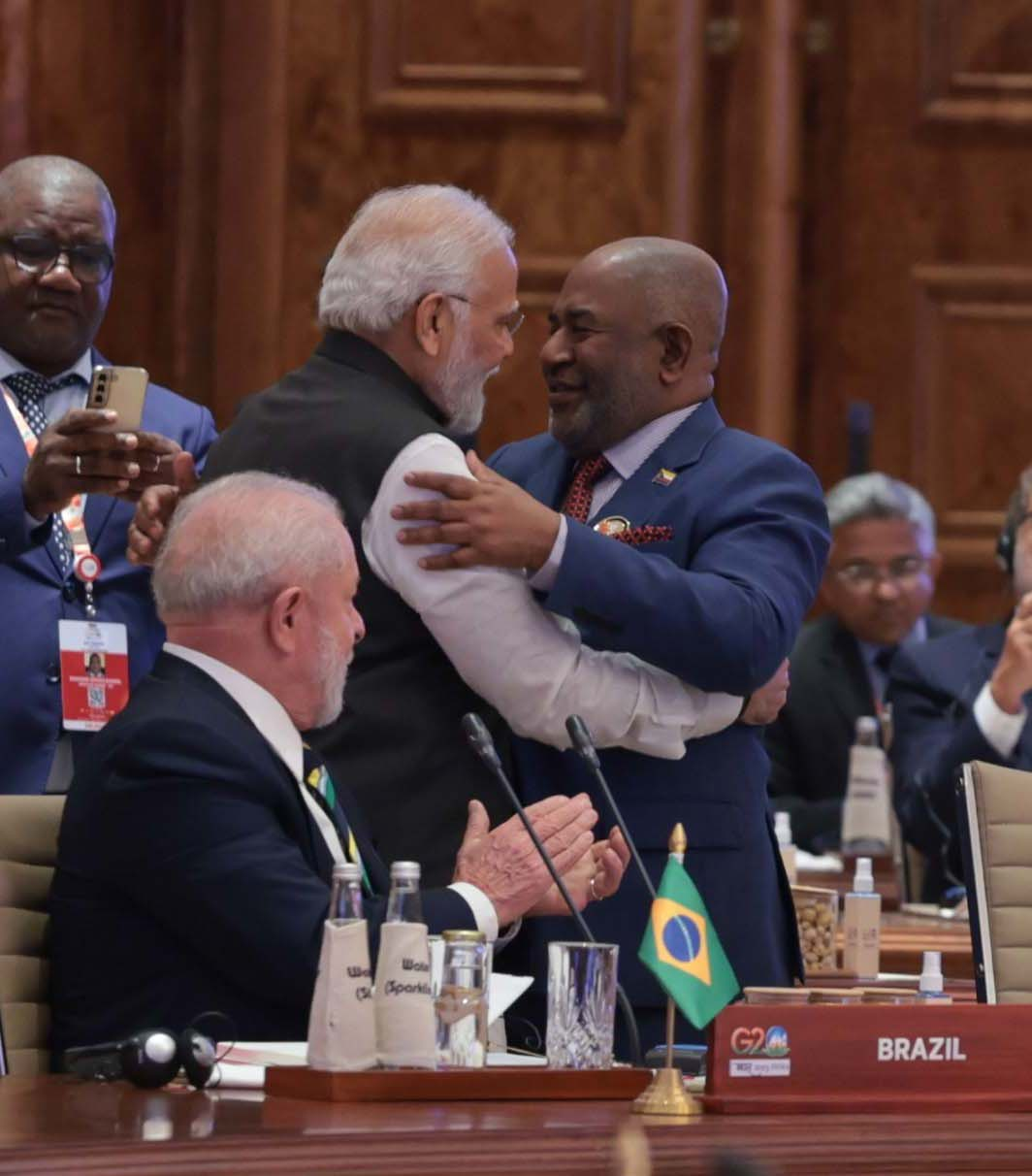
Azali Assoumani, President of the African Union, is greeted by Narendra Modi, G20 Chairman, at the G20 summit in 2023.

India held the 2023 summit in September 2023. The presidency's theme was Vasudhaiva Kutumbakam (Sanskrit: वसुधैव कुटुम्बकम्; English: "One Earth, One Family, One Future" (Note: Literal meaning: 'The World Is One Family')). In an interview on 26 August 2023, Prime Minister Narendra Modi expressed optimism about the G20 countries' evolving agenda under India's presidency, shifting toward a human-centric development approach that aligns with the concerns of the Global South, including addressing climate change, debt restructuring through the G20's Common Framework for debt, and a strategy for regulation of global cryptocurrencies. G20 expanded by the inclusion of African Union, it is also the first inclusion since 1999.

The 2024 G20 Rio de Janeiro summit in Brazil included the first G20 Social, a "broad space" for including civil society in developing policies related to the summit.

2025's Johannesburg summit was not only the first summit to be held in Africa, but also saw its host South Africa adopt a theme known as "Solidarity, Equality, Sustainability" for its presidency.

In 2026 the G20 Miami summit stated its goal to return the G20 to focusing on its core mission of driving economic growth and prosperity to produce results, mentioning three core themes: unleashing economic prosperity by limiting regulatory burdens, unlocking affordable and secure energy supply chains, and pioneering innovations in AI and emerging technologies.

=== Chair rotation ===
To decide which member nation should hold to chair the G20 leaders' meeting for a given year, all country members are assigned to one of five groupings, with all but one group having four members, the other having three. States from the same region are placed in the same group, except Group 1 and Group 2. All countries within a group are eligible to take over the G20 Presidency when it is their group's turn. Therefore, the states within the relevant group need to negotiate among themselves to select the next G20 President. Each year, a different G20 member country assumes the presidency starting from 1 December until 30 November. This system has been in place since 2010, when South Korea, which is in Group 5, held the G20 chair. The table below lists the nations' groupings:

Group 1	Group 2	Group 3 (Latin America)	Group 4 (Western Europe)	Group 5 (East/Southeast Asia)
Australia (2014); Canada (2010-1); Saudi Arabia (2020); United States (2008, 2009-2, 2026)	India (2023); Russia (2013); South Africa (2025); Turkey (2015)	Argentina (2018); Brazil (2024); Mexico (2012)	France (2011); Germany (2017); Italy (2021); United Kingdom (2009-1)	China (2016); Indonesia (2022); Japan (2019); South Korea (2010-2)

To ensure continuity, the presidency is supported by a "troika" made up of the current, immediate past and next host countries.

== Organization ==
The G20 operates without a permanent secretariat or staff. The group's chair (the presidency) rotates annually among the members and is selected from a different regional grouping of countries. The incumbent chair establishes a temporary secretariat for the duration of its term, which coordinates the group's work and organizes its meetings. Together with the previous and following presidency a so-called troika is formed, to provide a smooth transition of secretariat functions.

Additionally, the lack of a permanent secretariat has led to the G20 relying on the OECD fulfilling such functions.

=== Proposed permanent secretariat ===
In 2010, President of France Nicolas Sarkozy proposed the establishment of a permanent G20 secretariat, similar to the United Nations. Seoul and Paris were suggested as possible locations for its headquarters. Brazil and China supported the establishment of a secretariat, while Italy and Japan expressed opposition to the proposal. South Korea proposed a "cyber secretariat" as an alternative.

== Members ==
As of 2023, there are 21 members in the group: Argentina, Australia, Brazil, Canada, China, France, Germany, India, Indonesia, Italy, Japan, Mexico, Russia, Saudi Arabia, South Africa, South Korea, Turkey, the United Kingdom, the United States, the European Union and the African Union. Guest invitees include, among others, The Netherlands, Spain, the United Nations, the World Bank and ASEAN.

Representatives include, at the leaders' summits, the leaders of nineteen countries, the African Union and of the European Union, and, at the ministerial-level meetings, the finance ministers and central bank governors of nineteen countries, the African Union and of the European Union.

In addition, each year, the G20's guests include Spain; the Chair of ASEAN; a representative of the New Partnership for Africa's Development (NEPAD) and a country (sometimes more than one) invited by the presidency, usually from its own region.

The first of the tables below lists the member entities and their leaders, finance ministers and central bank governors. The second table lists relevant statistics such as population and GDP figures for each member, as well as detailing memberships of other international organizations, such as the G7, BRICS and MIKTA. Total GDP figures are given in millions of US dollars.

In September 2023, at the 18th G20 Summit, Indian PM Narendra Modi announced that the African Union has been included as a member of the G20, making it the 21st member.

=== Member of head of state and head of government ===
Member	Leader(s)	Finance portfolio	Portfolio minister	Central bank	Central bank governor
Argentina	Javier Milei	Minister of Economy	Luis Caputo	Central Bank of the Argentine Republic	Santiago Bausili
Australia	Anthony Albanese	Treasurer	Jim Chalmers	Reserve Bank of Australia	Michele Bullock
Brazil	Luiz Inácio Lula da Silva	Minister of Finance	Dario Durigan	Central Bank of Brazil	Gabriel Galípolo
Canada	Mark Carney	Minister of Finance	François-Philippe Champagne	Bank of Canada	Tiff Macklem
China	Xi Jinping	Minister of Finance	Lan Fo'an	People's Bank of China	Pan Gongsheng
China	Li Qiang	Minister of Finance	Lan Fo'an	People's Bank of China	Pan Gongsheng
France	Emmanuel Macron	Minister of Economics and Finance	Roland Lescure	Bank of France	François Villeroy de Galhau
Germany	Friedrich Merz	Minister of Finance	Lars Klingbeil	Deutsche Bundesbank	Joachim Nagel
India	Narendra Modi	Minister of Finance	Nirmala Sitharaman	Reserve Bank of India	Sanjay Malhotra
Indonesia	Prabowo Subianto	Minister of Finance	Suahasil Nazara	Bank Indonesia	Destry Damayanti
Italy	Giorgia Meloni	Minister of Economy and Finance	Giancarlo Giorgetti	Bank of Italy	Fabio Panetta
Japan	Sanae Takaichi	Minister of Finance	Satsuki Katayama	Bank of Japan	Kazuo Ueda
Mexico	Claudia Sheinbaum	Secretary of Finance and Public Credit	Edgar Amador Zamora	Bank of Mexico	Victoria Rodríguez Ceja
Russia	Vladimir Putin	Minister of Finance	Anton Siluanov	Bank of Russia	Elvira Nabiullina
Saudi Arabia	Salman bin Abdulaziz Al Saud	Minister of Finance	Mohammed Al-Jadaan	Saudi Central Bank	Fahad Almubarak
South Africa	Cyril Ramaphosa	Minister of Finance	Enoch Godongwana	South African Reserve Bank	Lesetja Kganyago
South Korea	Lee Jae Myung	Minister of Economy and Finance	Lee Hyoung-il	Bank of Korea	Hyun Song Shin
Turkey	Recep Tayyip Erdoğan	Minister of Treasury and Finance	Mehmet Şimşek	Central Bank of the Republic of Turkey	Fatih Karahan
United Kingdom	Andy Burnham	Chancellor of the Exchequer	John Healey	Bank of England	Andrew Bailey
United States	Donald Trump	Secretary of the Treasury	Scott Bessent	Federal Reserve	Kevin Warsh
European Union	António Costa	Commissioner for Economy	Valdis Dombrovskis	European Central Bank	Christine Lagarde
European Union	Ursula von der Leyen	Commissioner for Economy	Valdis Dombrovskis	European Central Bank	Christine Lagarde
African Union	João Lourenço	Commissioner for Economic Affairs	Victor Harison	African Central Bank (yet to be established)	TBA
African Union	Mahamoud Ali Youssouf	Commissioner for Economic Affairs	Victor Harison	African Central Bank (yet to be established)	TBA

=== Member country data ===
Member	Trade bil. USD (2025)	Nom. GDP mil. USD (2026)	PPP GDP mil. USD (2026)	Nom. GDP per capita USD (2026)	PPP GDP per capita USD (2026)	HDI (2023)	Population (2026)	Area km^{2}	P5	G4	G7	BRICS	MIKTA	CPTPP	RCEP	APEC	OECD	DAC	C'wth	SCO	IMF economy classification
Argentina	170	688,378	1,591,288	14,357	33,187	0.865	46,003,734	2,780,400	No	No	No	No	No	No	No	No	negotiating	No	No	No	Emerging
Australia	924	2,123,963	2,098,888	75,648	74,755	0.958	27,227,096	7,692,024	No	No	No	No	Yes	Yes	Yes	Yes	Yes	Yes	Yes	No	Advanced
Brazil	875	2,635,912	5,229,586	12,313	24,428	0.786	213,562,666	8,515,767	No	Yes	No	Yes	No	No	No	No	negotiating	No	No	No	Emerging
Canada	1,654	2,507,340	2,910,718	60,305	70,006	0.939	40,467,728	9,984,670	No	No	Yes	No	No	Yes	No	Yes	Yes	Yes	Yes	No	Advanced
China	7,896	20,851,593	44,295,453	14,874	31,596	0.797	1,412,914,089	9,596,960	Yes	No	No	Yes	No	applicant	Yes	Yes	participant	No	No	Yes	Emerging
France	2,654	3,596,094	4,734,241	52,083	68,567	0.920	66,746,401	640,679	Yes	No	Yes	No	No	No	No	No	Yes	Yes	No	No	Advanced
Germany	5,002	5,452,858	6,408,420	65,303	76,747	0.959	83,644,258	357,114	No	Yes	Yes	No	No	No	No	No	Yes	Yes	No	No	Advanced
India	2,343	4,153,191	18,902,320	2,813	12,801	0.685	1,476,625,576	3,287,263	No	Yes	No	Yes	No	No	No	No	participant	No	Yes	Yes	Emerging
Indonesia	662	1,539,872	5,449,145	5,362	18,973	0.728	287,886,782	1,904,569	No	No	No	Yes	Yes	applicant	Yes	Yes	negotiating	No	No	No	Emerging
Italy	1,896	2,738,164	3,871,906	46,505	65,761	0.915	58,926,166	301,336	No	No	Yes	No	No	No	No	No	Yes	Yes	No	No	Advanced
Japan	2,302	4,379,253	7,262,163	35,703	59,207	0.925	122,427,731	377,930	No	Yes	Yes	No	No	Yes	Yes	Yes	Yes	Yes	No	No	Advanced
Mexico	1,521	2,120,855	3,580,952	15,779	26,643	0.789	132,997,658	1,964,375	No	No	No	No	Yes	Yes	No	Yes	Yes	No	No	No	Emerging
South Korea	1,837	1,931,008	3,542,014	37,412	68,624	0.937	51,600,388	100,210	No	No	No	No	Yes	No	Yes	Yes	Yes	Yes	No	No	Advanced
Russia	861	2,656,452	7,525,159	18,525	52,479	0.832	143,394,458	17,098,242	Yes	No	No	Yes	No	No	No	Yes	No	No	No	Yes	Emerging
Saudi Arabia	789	1,388,676	2,894,592	37,811	78,815	0.900	35,165,787	2,149,690	No	No	No	invited	No	No	No	No	No	participant	No	partner	Emerging
South Africa	244	479,964	1,070,835	7,503	16,740	0.741	65,453,084	1,221,037	No	No	No	Yes	No	No	No	No	participant	No	Yes	No	Emerging
Turkey	818	1,640,223	4,025,249	19,018	46,672	0.853	87,926,082	783,562	No	No	No	No	Yes	No	No	No	Yes	No	No	partner	Emerging
United Kingdom	3,494	4,264,794	4,720,863	61,056	67,585	0.946	69,931,528	242,495	Yes	No	Yes	No	No	Yes	No	No	Yes	Yes	Yes	No	Advanced
United States	9,076	32,383,920	32,383,920	94,430	94,430	0.938	349,035,494	9,833,517	Yes	No	Yes	No	No	No	No	Yes	Yes	Yes	No	No	Advanced
European Union	9,189	23,034,637	30,677,594	51,027	67,957	0.915 (Note: average of all EU member states)	447,890,473	4,233,262	No	No	Yes	No	No	No	No	No	participant	Yes	No	No	Advanced (majority) (Note: 24 out of 27 EU states are classified as advanced.)
African Union	1,379	3,555,435	12,518,946	(Note: International Monatary Fund: GDP per capita, current prices – U.S. dollars per capita)2,366	(Note: International Monatary Fund: GDP per capita, current prices – Purchasing power parity; international dollars per capita)8,330	0.577 (Note: 2020)	1,583,746,277	29,922,059	No	No	No	No	No	No	No	No	No	No	No	No	Emerging

In addition to these 21 members, the chief executive officers of several other international forums and institutions participate in meetings of the G20. These include the managing director and Chairman of the International Monetary Fund, the President of the World Bank, and the Chairman of the Development Assistance Committee.

The G20's membership does not reflect exactly the 21 largest economies of the world in any given year; as the organization states:

In a forum such as the G20, it is particularly important for the number of countries involved to be restricted and fixed to ensure the effectiveness and continuity of its activity. There are no formal criteria for G20 membership and the composition of the group has remained unchanged since it was established. Because of the objectives of the G20, it was considered important that countries and regions of systemic significance for the international financial system be included. Aspects such as geographical balance and population representation also played a major part.

=== Role of Asian countries ===
A 2011 report released by the Asian Development Bank (ADB) predicted that large Asian economies such as China and India would play a more important role in global economic governance in the future. The report claimed that the rise of emerging market economies heralded a new world order, in which the G20 would become the global economic steering committee. The ADB furthermore noted that Asian countries had led the global recovery following the late-2000s recession. It predicted that the region would have a greater presence on the global stage, shaping the G20's agenda for balanced and sustainable growth through strengthening intraregional trade and stimulating domestic demand.

== Invitees ==
G20 members (dark blue), countries represented through the European Union and African Union (light blue) and previously invited states (pink) as of 2024.

Typically, several participants that are not full members of the G20 are extended invitations to participate in the summits. Permanent guest invitees are: the government of Spain; the Chair of the Association of Southeast Asian Nations and a representative of the New Partnership for Africa's Development are invited in their capacities as leaders of their organisations and as heads of government of their home states. In addition, the leaders of the Financial Stability Board, the International Labour Organization, the International Monetary Fund, the Group of 24, the Organisation for Economic Co-operation and Development, the United Nations, the World Bank Group and the World Trade Organization are invited and participate in pre-summit planning within the policy purview of their respective organisation.

Other invitees are chosen by the host country, usually one or two countries from its region; for example, South Korea invited Singapore. International organisations which have been invited in the past include the Asia-Pacific Economic Cooperation (APEC), the Basel Committee on Banking Supervision (BCBS), the Commonwealth of Independent States (CIS), the Eurasian Economic Community (EAEC), the European Central Bank (ECB), the Food and Agriculture Organization (FAO), the Global Governance Group (3G) and the Gulf Cooperation Council (GCC). Previously, the Netherlands had a similar status to Spain while the rotating presidency of the Council of the European Union would also receive an invitation, but only in that capacity and not as their own state's leader (such as the Czech premiers Mirek Topolánek and Jan Fischer during the 2009 summits).

== Permanent guest invitees ==
Invitee	Officeholder	State	Official title
International Labour Organization (ILO)	Gilbert Houngbo	—N/a	Director General
International Monetary Fund (IMF)	Kristalina Georgieva	—N/a	Managing Director
Intergovernmental Group of Twenty-Four (G-24)	Iyabo Masha	—N/a	Director
Spain	Pedro Sánchez	Spain	Prime Minister
New Partnership for Africa's Development (AUDA-NEPAD)	Abdel Fattah El-Sisi	Egypt	President (chair)
Organisation for Economic Co-operation and Development (OECD)	Mathias Cormann	—N/a	Secretary-General
United Nations (UN)	António Guterres	—N/a	Secretary-General
World Bank Group (WBG)	Ajay Banga	—N/a	President
World Health Organization (WHO)	Tedros Adhanom	—N/a	Director General
World Trade Organization (WTO)	Ngozi Okonjo-Iweala	—N/a	Director General

== Agenda ==
=== Financial focus ===
The initial G20 agenda, as conceived by US, Canadian and German policymakers, was very much focused on the sustainability of sovereign debt and global financial stability, in an inclusive format that would bring in the largest developing economies as equal partners. During a summit in November 2008, the leaders of the group pledged to contribute trillions to international financial organizations, including the World Bank and IMF, mainly for re-establishing the global financial system.

Since inception, the recurring themes covered by G20 summit participants have related in priority to global economic growth, international trade and financial market regulation.

The G20 has led the Debt Service Suspension Initiative, through which official bilateral creditors suspended debt repayments of 73 of the poorest debtor countries.

=== Growth and sustainability ===
The G20 countries account for almost 75% of global carbon emissions. After the adoption of the UN Sustainable Development Goals and the Paris Climate Agreement in 2015, more "issues of global significance" were added to the G20 agenda: migration, digitisation, employment, healthcare, the economic empowerment of women, development aid and stopping climate change.

The G20 countries promised in 2009 to phase out 'inefficient subsidies'. Despite these promises G20 members have subsidised fossil fuel companies over $3.3 trillion between 2015 and 2021, with several states increasing subsidies; Australia (+48.2%), the US (+36.7%), Indonesia (+26.6%), France (+23.8%), China (+4.1%), Brazil (+3.0%), Mexico (+2.6%). China alone generates over half of the coal-generated electricity in the world.

=== Interrelated themes ===
Wolfgang Schäuble, German Federal Minister of Finance, had insisted on the interconnected nature of the issues facing G20 countries, be they purely financial or developmental, and the need to reach effective, cross-cutting policy measures: "Globalization has lifted hundreds of millions out of poverty, but there is also a growing rise in frustration in some quarters […] development, [national] security and migration are all interlinked".

== G20 engagement groups ==
The G20 engagement groups and pre-conferences are independent collectives that are led by organisations of the host country. They represent a diverse group of stakeholders and work collectively to develop non-binding policy recommendations formally submitted to the G20 leaders for consideration.

For the 2022 G20 hosted by Indonesia, there were 10 engagement groups formed to facilitate independent stakeholders in developing proposals and policy recommendations for G20 leaders.

Startup20 and other engagement groups were initiated under the G20 India Presidency of 2023.

== Influence and accountability ==
The G20's prominent membership gives it a strong input on global policy despite lacking any formal ability to enforce rules. There are disputes over the legitimacy of the G20, and criticisms of its organisation and the efficacy of its declarations.

The G20's transparency and accountability have been questioned by critics, who call attention to the absence of a formal charter and the fact that the most important G20 meetings are closed-door. In 2001, the economist Frances Stewart proposed an Economic Security Council within the United Nations as an alternative to the G20. In such a council, members would be elected by the General Assembly based on their importance to the world economy, and the contribution they are willing to provide to world economic development.

The cost and extent of summit-related security is often a contentious issue in the hosting country, and G20 summits have attracted protesters from a variety of backgrounds, including information activists, opponents of fractional-reserve banking and anti-capitalists. In 2010, the Toronto G20 summit sparked mass protests and rioting, leading to the largest mass arrest in Canada's history.

In 2025, the G20 was hosted for the first time on the African Continent under the South African presidency. Donald Trump, however, declared that South Africa "should not even be" in the G20 and boycotted the summit, accusing South Africa of "white genocide." The President of Argentina, Javier Milei, likewise joined the boycott. The additional absence of leaders from China, Mexico, and Russia led to questions about the forum's influence going into the first and only African-hosted G20 summit.

== Views on the G20's exclusivity of membership ==
Although the G20 has stated that the group's "economic weight and broad membership gives it a high degree of legitimacy and influence over the management of the global economy and financial system", its legitimacy has been challenged. A 2011 report for the Danish Institute for International Studies criticised the G20's exclusivity, particularly highlighting its underrepresentation of African countries and its practice of inviting observers from non-member states as a mere "concession at the margins", which does not grant the organisation representational legitimacy. Concerning the membership issue, U.S. President Barack Obama noted the difficulty of balancing the interests of different states: "Everybody wants the smallest possible group that includes them. So, if they're the 21st largest nation in the world, they want the G-21, and think it's highly unfair if they have been cut out." Others stated in 2011 that the exclusivity is not an insurmountable problem and proposed mechanisms by which it could become more inclusive.

=== Norwegian perspective ===
In line with Norway's emphasis on inclusive international processes, the United Nations, and the UN system, in a 2010 interview with Der Spiegel, the current prime minister of Norway Jonas Gahr Støre called the G20 "one of the greatest setbacks since World War II" as 173 states who are all members of the UN are not among the G20. This includes Norway, a major developed economy and the seventh-largest contributor to UN international development programs, which is not a member state of the EU, and thus is not represented in the G20 even indirectly. Norway, like other such states, has little or no voice within the group. Støre argued that the G20 undermines the legitimacy of international organizations set up in the aftermath of World War II, such as the IMF, World Bank and United Nations:

The G20 is a self-appointed group. Its composition is determined by the major countries and powers. It may be more representative than the G7 or the G8, in which only the richest countries are represented, but it is still arbitrary. We no longer live in the 19th century, a time when the major powers met and redrew the map of the world. No one needs a new Congress of Vienna.

However, Norway, has moderated this position in practice, and has contributed to a number of G20-work streams for years, in particular on health, energy and climate. Under the government of Erna Solberg, Norway attended the 2017 G20 summit in Hamburg, Germany. The country was formally invited by Brazil as a guest to the 2024 G20 summit in Rio de Janeiro and was reinvited by South Africa to the 2025 summit in Johannesburg. Støre attended both summits as prime minister of Norway and expressed support for the G20.

=== Spanish participation ===
Spain is the world's twelfth largest economy by nominal GDP and the fifteenth largest by purchasing power parity; it also ranks fourth in the European Union and the second among Spanish-speaking countries. In addition, since the 1990s several Spanish companies have gained multinational status, and Spain is an important foreign investor worldwide. Spain's economic size and performance exceed those of several current G20 members, such as Argentina and South Africa, and the country has been a "permanent guest" at every G20 summit since 2008. Consequently, Spain is considered by some analysts to be a de facto member of the G20. As of 2025, Spain has not requested official membership.

=== Polish aspirations ===
During a 2010 meeting with foreign diplomats, Polish president Lech Kaczyński said:

The Polish economy is, according to our data, the 18th world economy. The place of my country is among the members of the G20. This is a very simple postulate: firstly – it results from the size of the Polish economy, secondly – it results from the fact that Poland is the biggest country in its region and the biggest country that has experienced a certain story. That story is a political and economic transformation.

Several commentators and analysts have supported Poland's position. In 2012, Tim Ferguson wrote in Forbes that swapping Argentina for Poland should be considered, claiming that the Polish economy was headed toward a leadership role in Europe and its membership would be more legitimate. A similar opinion was expressed by Marcin Sobczyk in the Wall Street Journal. Mamta Murthi from the World Bank said: "To be in 'a club', what Poland can do is to continue working as if it already is in the club it wants to join." A 2014 report by consulting firm Ernst & Young described Poland as one of the "optimal members" to join the G20 based on an analysis of trade, institutional and investment links.

G20 membership has been an explicit priority of Poland's Law and Justice party since 2015. In March 2017, Deputy Prime Minister of Poland Mateusz Morawiecki took part in a meeting of G20 financial ministers in Baden-Baden as the first Polish representative.

In September 2025, Polish President Karol Nawrocki announced that he had received an invitation from American President Donald Trump to attend the G20 Summit taking place in 2026 in Miami, Florida. The statement was made following a meeting between the two presidents at the White House. According to the Head of the International Policy Bureau of the Chancellery of the President of Poland, Minister Marcin Przydacz, Nawrocki's invitation to the G20 Summit marks the beginning of the process of Poland's accession to the group of G20 countries. On October 23, 2026 Prime Minister Donald Tusk announced that Poland had received an invitation from UK Prime Minister Andy Burnham to attend the G20 Summit taking place in 2027 in Manchester. He also announced that India supports Poland's permanent membership in G20.

=== Global Governance Group (3G) response ===
In June 2010, Singapore's representative to the United Nations warned the G20 that its decisions would affect "all countries, big and small", and asserted that prominent non-G20 members should be included in financial reform discussions. Singapore thereafter took a leading role in organizing the Global Governance Group (3G), an informal grouping of 30 non-G20 countries (including several microstates and many Third World countries) to collectively channel their views into the G20 process more effectively. Singapore's chairing of the 3G was cited as a rationale for inviting Singapore to the November 2010 G20 summit in South Korea, as well as 2011, 2013, 2014, 2015, 2016, and 2017 summits.

=== Foreign Policy critiques ===
The American magazine Foreign Policy has published articles condemning the G20, in terms of its principal function as an alternative to the supposedly exclusive G8. It questions the actions of some of the G20 members and advances the notion that some states should not have membership in the first place. Furthermore, with the effects of the Great Recession still ongoing, the magazine has criticized the G20's efforts to implement reforms of the world's financial institutions, branding such efforts as failures.

=== Calls for removing Russia ===
In March 2022, following the Russian invasion of Ukraine, U.S. President Joe Biden called for the removal of Russia from the group. Alternatively, he suggested that Ukraine be allowed to attend the G20 2022 summit, despite its lack of membership. Canadian Prime Minister Justin Trudeau also said the group should "re-evaluate" Russia's participation. Russia claims it would not be a significant issue, as most G20 members are already fighting Russia economically due to the war. China suggested that expelling Russia would be counterproductive. In November 2022, Indonesia and Russia stated that Vladimir Putin would not attend the G20 summit in person, but may attend virtually. During the 2022 summit, Ukrainian president Volodymyr Zelenskyy appeared in a video statement and repeatedly addressed the assembly as the 'G19' as a means of indicating his viewpoint that Russia should be removed from the group. Despite the group refusing criticism on Russia directly in 2023 for the war, Putin was not present at the G20 summit due to the arrest warrant issued by the ICC in 2024.

== See also ==
- Model G20
- G8
- G7
- Regional Power
- League of Nations
- MIKTA
- BRICS
- United Nations
