= Johannes F. Linn =

Johannes F. Linn is a nonresident senior fellow in the Center for Sustainable Development, housed within the Global Economy and Development program at the Brookings Institution. He is also a distinguished resident scholar of the Emerging Markets Forum, senior advisor at the Results for Development Institute (R4D) and senior research fellow at the International Initiative for Impact Evaluation (3ie).

Linn received his training as an economist at Oxford University, England (B.A., 1968), and at Cornell University, USA (Ph.D., 1973). He joined the World Bank in 1973, where for nine years he worked in the Bank's research wing on issues of urban development policy. Based on his research, he published two books: Cities in Developing World: Policies for Their Equitable and Efficient Growth (Oxford University Press, 1983) and (with Roy Bahl) Urban Public Finance in Developing Countries (Oxford University Press, 1992). Subsequently, he served as country and regional economist in the Bank's East Asia regional staff. In 1988, he published, with Amarendra Bhattacharya, a study entitled Trade and Industrial Policy in the Developing Countries of East Asia (World Bank Discussion Paper No. 27). In 1987/88, Linn was staff director of World Development Report 1988 (Oxford University Press, 1988), which dealt principally with issues of public finance in development. Between 1988 and 1991, he served as senior economic advisor in the Bank's Development Economics Staff, as the director of its International Economics Department and as director of its Country Economics Department.

In 1991, Linn was appointed the World Bank's vice president for financial policy and resource mobilization, in charge of overall financial policies and prudential management of the World Bank (IBRD and IDA) and of mobilizing capital resources for IBRD as well as donor resources for IDA and for the Global Environment Facility (GEF). From January 1996 through September 2003, Linn served as the Bank's vice president for Europe and Central Asia (ECA). A collection of his speeches was published under the title Transition Years--Reflections on Economic Reform and Social Change in Europe and Central Asia (World Bank, 2004).

From September 2003 to June 2005, Linn was a visiting fellow at the Brookings Institution. During 2004-5 Linn also served as project leader and lead author for the Central Asia Human Development Report (UNDP, 2005). From July 2005 to June 2010, Linn was director of the Wolfensohn Center for Development at Brookings. Since July 2010, Linn is a nonresident Senior Fellow at Brookings. In 2011, 2014, and 2017, he served, respectively, as Chair of the 9th, 10th, and 11th Replenishment Consultations of the International Fund for Agricultural Development. In 2019 he served as global facilitator for the first replenishment of the Green Climate Fund (GCF). Since October 2020 he is global facilitator for the Systematic Observations Financing Facility (SOFF). Linn co-founded in 2015 the international Scaling Community of Practice with Brookings nonresident senior fellow Larry Cooley, and both currently are its co-chairs. This Community of Practice serves a platform for exchanging best practice, lessons and tools among the 4,000-plus members and for promoting a more systematic focus on sustainable scaling of the impact of successful development and climate interventions.

Linn's current research interests and recent publications are in the areas of development effectiveness (with a special focus on scaling up successful development interventions), regional cooperation (with a special focus on Central Asia), and global governance reform (with a special focus on multilateral development finance institutions). He co-edited and contributed to various books, including: Global Governance Reform: Breaking the Stalemate (Brookings, 2007), Central Asia and the Caucasus: At the Crossroads of Eurasia in the 21st Century (Sage, 2011), Getting to Scale: How to Bring Development Solutions to Millions of Poor People (Brookings Press 2013), Financing Metropolitan Governments in Developing Countries (Lincoln Institute for Land Policy, 2013), Kazakhstan 2050: Toward a Modern Society for All (Oxford University Press, 2014), Central Asia 2050: Unleashing the Region’s Potential (Sage, 2016), The Imperative of Development: The Wolfensohn Center at Brookings (Brookings Press, 2017), China’s Belt and Road Initiative: Potential Transformation of Central and the South Caucasus (Sage, 2019) and The Belt and Road Initiative & Global 2030 Sustainability: Evolution of the BRI after the Second BRI Forum in April 2019 (Penguin 2023). Other recent publications include an article on scaling development impact to achieve the SDGs in the Global Summitry E-Journal and a Brookings blog on mainstreaming scaling in development funder organizations.
