= Emerging Markets Forum =

The Emerging Markets Forum
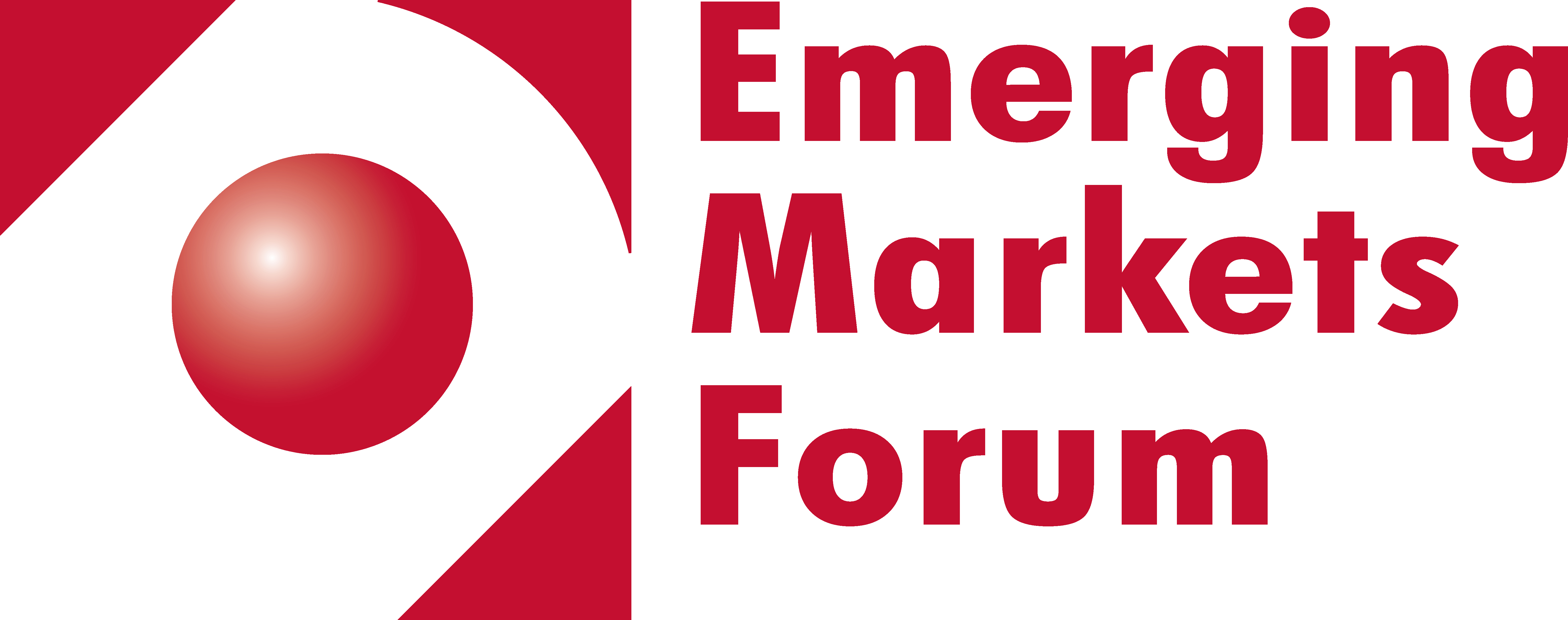
- Abbreviation: EMF
- Headquarters: Washington, DC
- co-chair: Fidel Valdez Ramos
- co-chair: Haruhiko Kuroda
- co-chair: Michel Camdessus
- Parent organization: Centennial Group Inc.

The Emerging Markets Forum (EMF) is an accredited non-profit, 501(c)(3) organization dedicated to developing dialogue on economic, financial, and social issues facing emerging market economies. EMF advocates for increased dialogue between government and corporate leaders through its global forum events. Its motto is "Bringing people together to accelerate growth and well-being in emerging markets."

== History ==
The Emerging Markets Forum was founded in 2005 by the leaders of Centennial Group International. The president and CEO of the Emerging Markets Forum is Harinder Kohli, the forum manager is Sylvie Naville, the deputy forum manager is Charlotte Hess, the manager of information analytics is Harpaul Alberto Kohli, Dana Sleeper handles social media and websites, Gautam Kaji is chairman of the board, and P.R. Narvekar is founding director. The co-chairmen of the forum are Michel Camdessus, former Managing Director of the International Monetary Fund and now honorary governor of the Central Bank of France, Haruhiko Kuroda, president of the Asian Development Bank, and Fidel V. Ramos, former president of the Philippines.

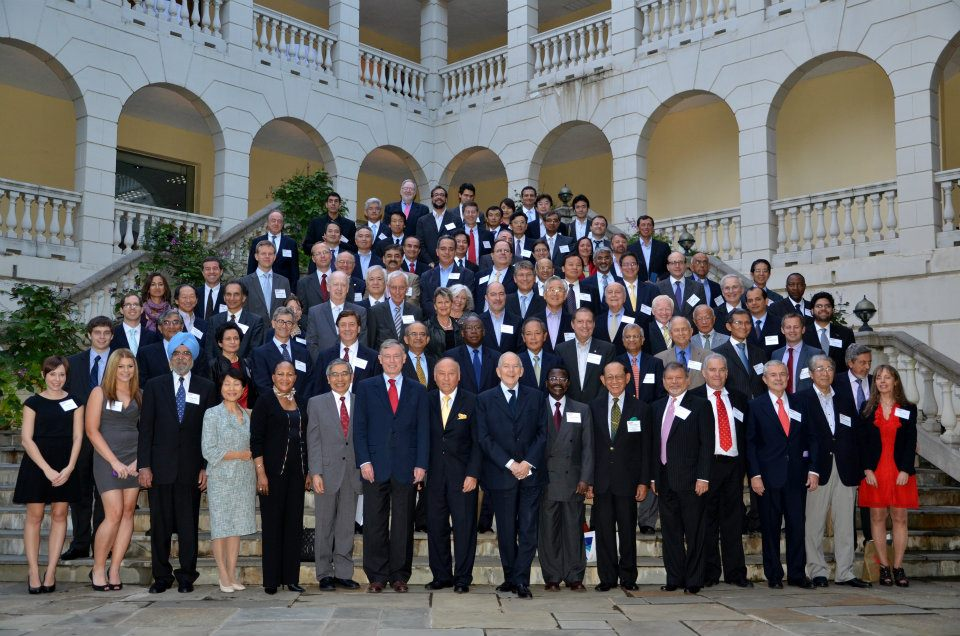

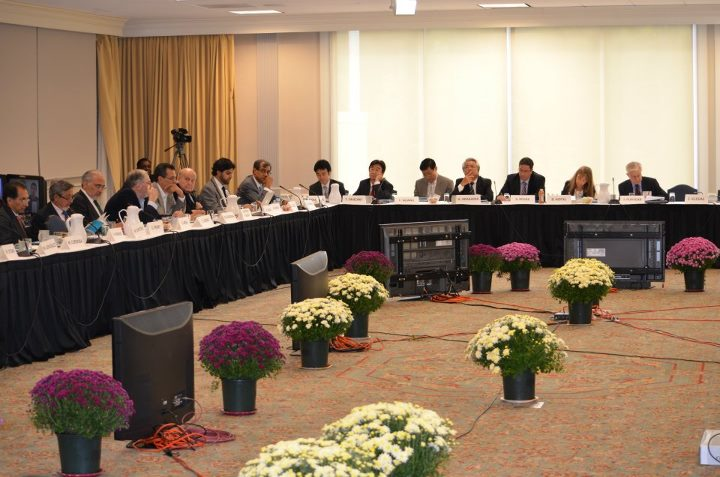

== Global and regional forum events ==
The EMF hosts one global meeting and several regional meetings every year. Each meeting is structured around issues that are common to emerging market economies. The EMF commissions policy experts to write background papers, which provide a starting point for forum discussions. Participants come from both the private and public sectors to engage in open dialogue and implement solutions that will benefit emerging market economies.

Past events have taken place in Jakarta, Vietnam, Mumbai, Hanoi, Bogota, Montevideo, Oxford, Switzerland, Morocco, South Africa, and other locations. Topics of interest at meetings include infrastructure, financial systems and the financial crisis, corruption and governance, climate change, global imbalances, public-private partnerships, and decoupling, among others.

== Participants ==
Sitting or former heads of state who have been participants include President Joseph Deiss (Switzerland), President Álvaro Uribe (Colombia), President Carlos Mesa (Bolivia), Prime Minister Fakhruddin Ahmed (Bangladesh), President José María Figueres (Costa Rica), President Horst Koehler (Germany), President Benjamin Mkapa (Tanzania), co-chair of the EMF President Fidel Valdez Ramos (Philippines), and Prime Minister Paul Martin (Canada).

Other participants include Ngozi Okonjo-Iweala (former World Bank managing director, former foreign minister of Nigeria, and Euromoney Finance Minister of the Year), Arun Shourie (Indian Parliament and former minister of telecommunications, commerce and privatization), Johannes F. Linn (Senior Fellow at the Brookings Institution; senior resident fellow, Emerging Markets Forum; and former vice president for Europe and Central Asia of the World Bank.), Indian Planning Commission deputy chairman Montek Singh Ahluwalia, former US Federal Reserve Chairman Paul Volcker, and the FT's Martin Wolf.

== Key publications ==
- A New Vision for Mexico 2042: Achieving Prosperity for All (2012)
- Asia 2050: Realizing the Asian Century (2011)
- Central Asia and the Caucasus — At the Crossroads of Eurasia in the 21st Century (2011)
- Reform of the International Monetary System — The Palais Royal Initiative (2011)
- Latin America 2040: Breaking Away from Complacency — An Agenda for Resurgence (2010)
- India 2039: An Affluent Society in One Generation (2010)

== See also ==
- Emerging markets
- International development

== Additional sources ==
- "India should address trade, economic issues to play global role". The Indian Express.
- Leahy, Joe. "India's huge gap between rich and poor threatens growth, warns study". The Financial Times.
- "Economy will kickstart in 3rd quarter". The Financial Express.
- "India affluent in 30 yrs: Experts". The Financial Express.
