= Scaling of innovations =

Industrial process leading to widespread use of an innovation

Scaling of innovations is an industrial and social process that leads to widespread use of an innovation. The potential of a production system to undergo this process is called its "scalability". Scaling is regarded the last step after the discovery, proof of concept and piloting of an innovation. In business it is often used as maximizing operational scale of the product. This technology, or project-focused scaling takes products and services as the point of departure and wants to see those to go scale. In the public sector, and for example in development aid, the desired impact is the point of departure and whatever leads to more impact is scaled (usually in the form of a range of innovations). However, some authors recognize that the public sector often uses the business way of scaling to reach impact, leading to disillusionment and doing more harm than good. Sometimes, scaling is seen as a process towards sustainable systems change at scale, where sustainability, systems change and responsible scaling are just as important as "reaching many".

== Dimensions ==
Although scaling is often associated only with "more, better, bigger" it is important to consider that it has three dimensions:

- Scaling out involves expanding the geographical spread, or reach, of a technology or practice over time. It is associated with quantitative processes like replication, expansion, extension, adoption, dissemination, transfer of technology, mainstreaming, and multiplication .
- Scaling up entails creating the necessary social and institutional preconditions for scaling out to happen efficiently. It is associated with qualitative processes like transition, institutionalizations, transformation, integration, evolution, and development.
- Scaling deep deals with the notion that sustainable and transformative impact is achieved only "when people´s hearts and minds, their values and cultural practices and the quality of relationships they have are transformed", to make the use of the innovation the new routine.

== Tools ==
The first toolkit on scaling innovations was made available for practitioners in 2006 by Cooley and Kohl. It was called the Scaling Up Management (SUM) Framework, it was subsequently refined and expanded in Editions 2 and 3, both of which include the MSI Scalability Assessment Tool. USAID adapted the latter in 2018 to the Agricultural Scalability Assessment Tool (ASAT). Other donors such as the International Fund for Agricultural Development (IFAD), the World Health Organization (WHO), and GIZ have also developed toolkits. Most recently, the International Maize and Wheat Improvement Center (CIMMYT) and the PPPLab (Note: PPPLab was a four-year research initiative (2014-2018) to study the effectiveness of Dutch-supported public-private partnerships. PPPLab focused on partnerships focussed on sustainability, access to water and food security.) developed the Scaling Scan. All these frameworks assign the difficulty of scaling innovations to a lack of clarity about what is required to achieve sustained results beyond smaller pilot programs. The tools help simplify and explain the complexities of scaling and guide users to systematically think through key elements, ingredients, or success factors.
