= 2020 extraordinary G20 summit on COVID-19 =

The extraordinary G20 summit on COVID-19 was a G20 leaders' summit held virtually via a video conference on 26 March 2020. The extraordinary G20 summit was called and chaired by King Salman of Saudi Arabia to support a coordinated global response to the COVID-19 pandemic.

== Participating leaders ==
source : G20 Information Centre

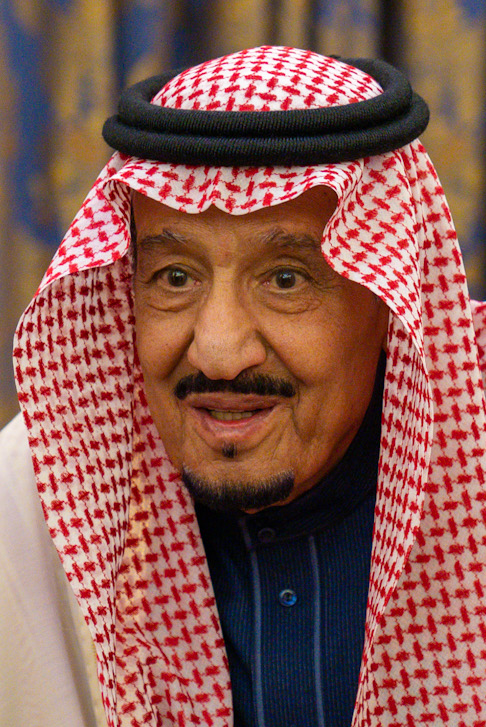
Saudi Arabia
Salman bin Abdulaziz Al Saud, King (host)

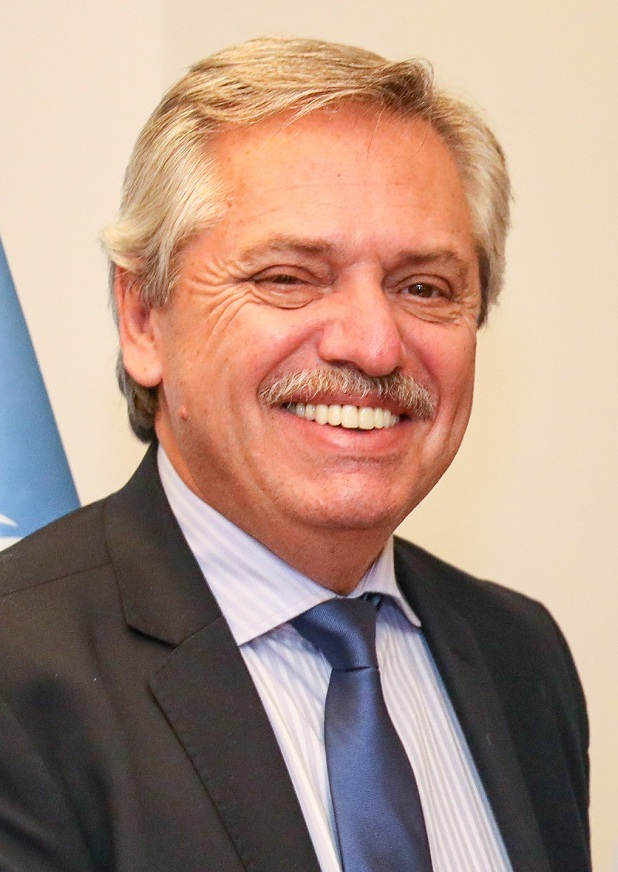
Argentina
Alberto Fernández, President

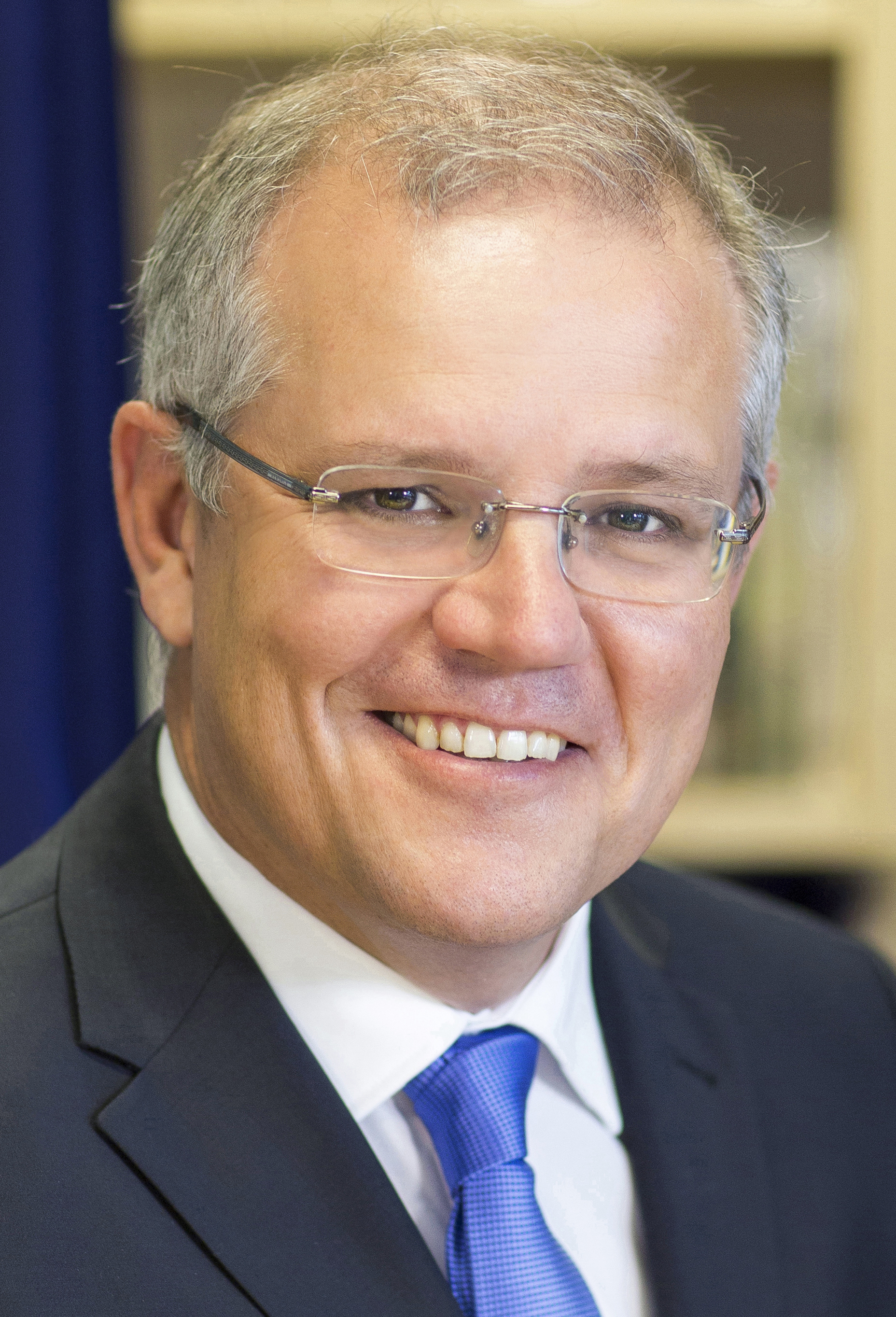
Australia
Scott Morrison, Prime Minister

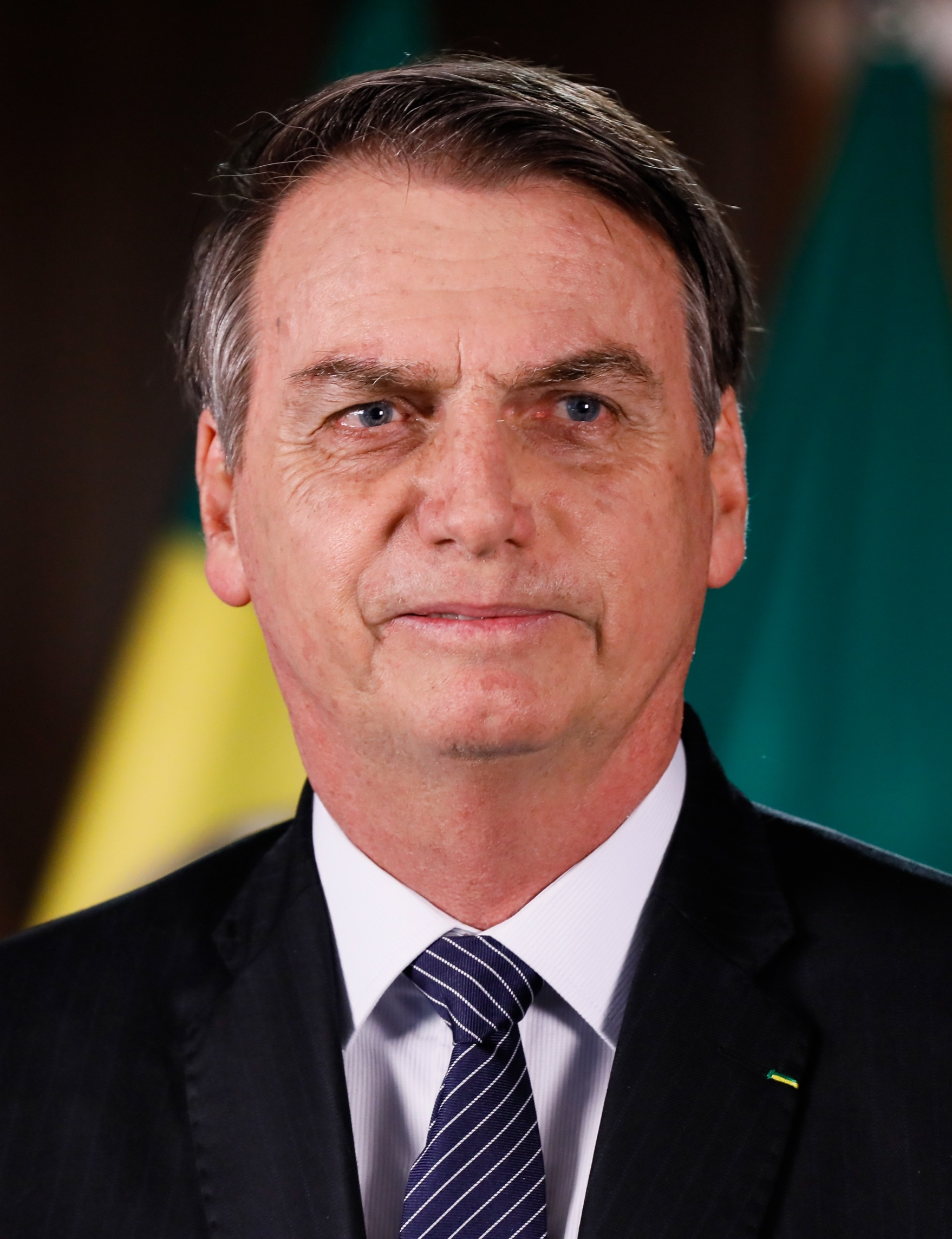
Brazil
Jair Bolsonaro, President

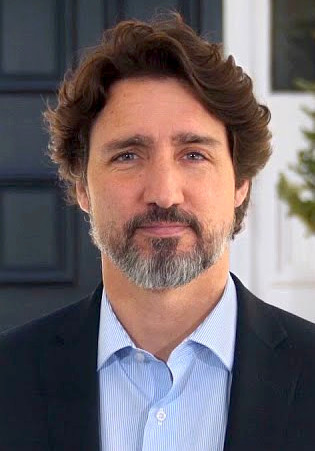
Canada
Justin Trudeau, Prime Minister

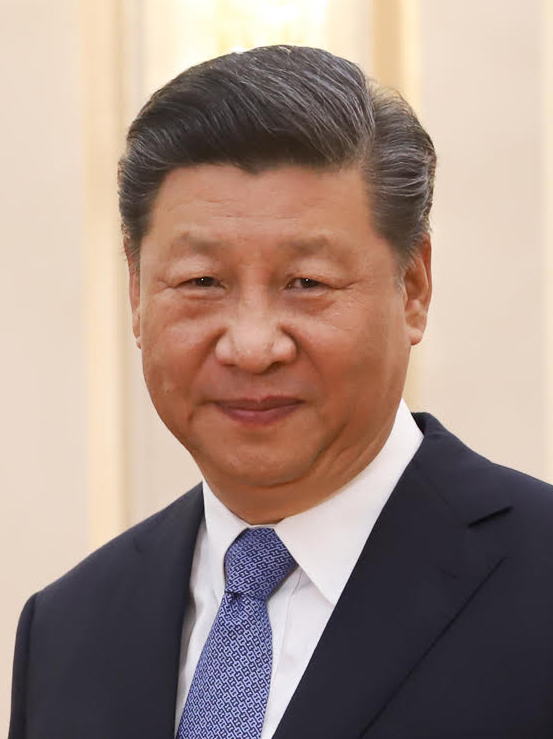
China
Xi Jinping, CCP General Secretary and President (Note: The president of China is legally a ceremonial office, but the general secretary of the Chinese Communist Party (de facto leader in one-party communist state) has always held this office since 1993 except for the months of transition.)

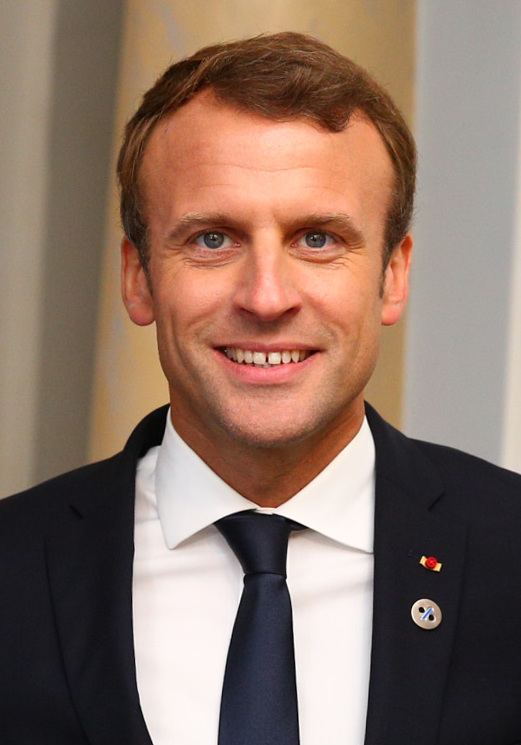
France
Emmanuel Macron, President

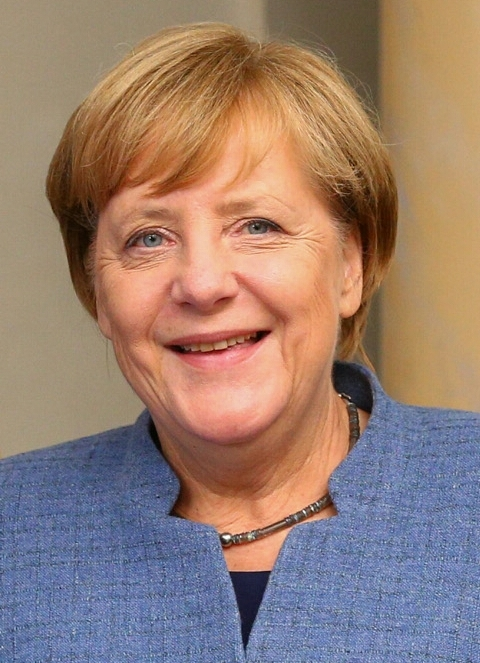
Germany
Angela Merkel, Chancellor

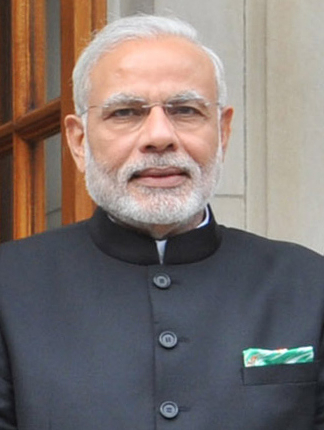
India
Narendra Modi, Prime Minister

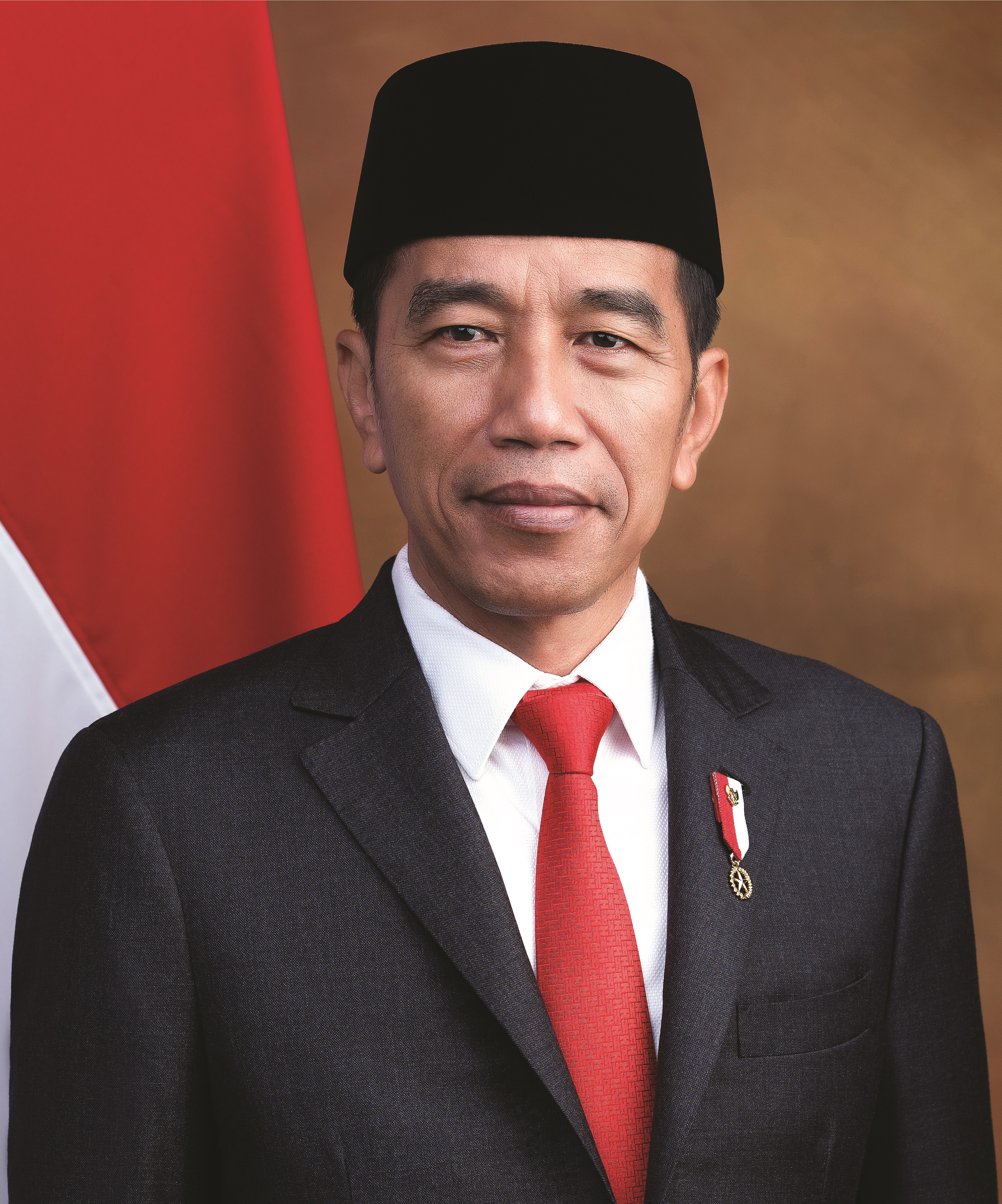
Indonesia
Joko Widodo, President

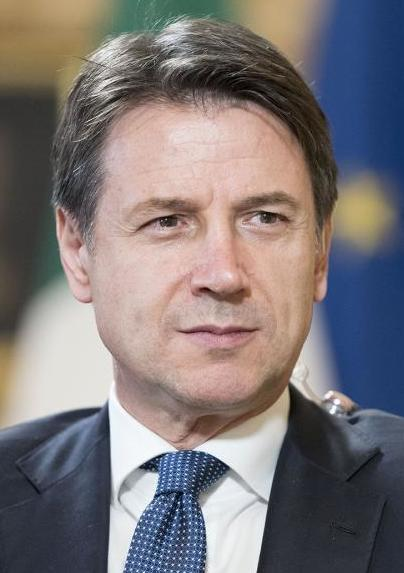
Italy
Giuseppe Conte, Prime Minister

Japan
Shinzo Abe, Prime Minister

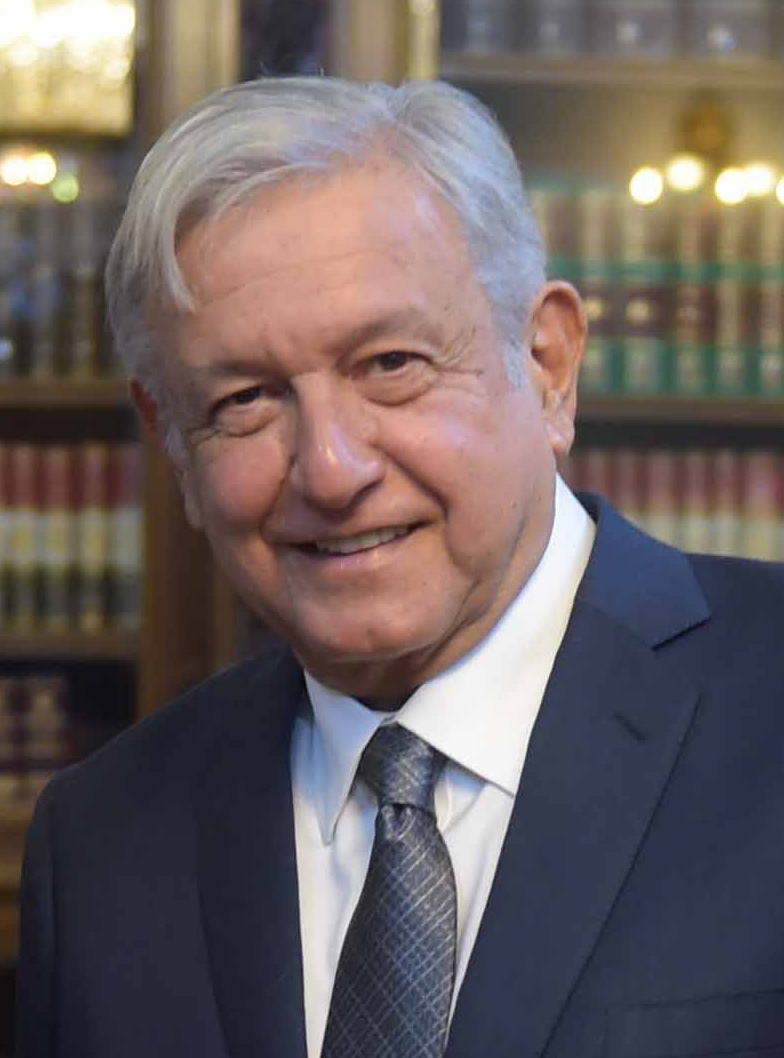
Mexico
Andrés Manuel López Obrador, President

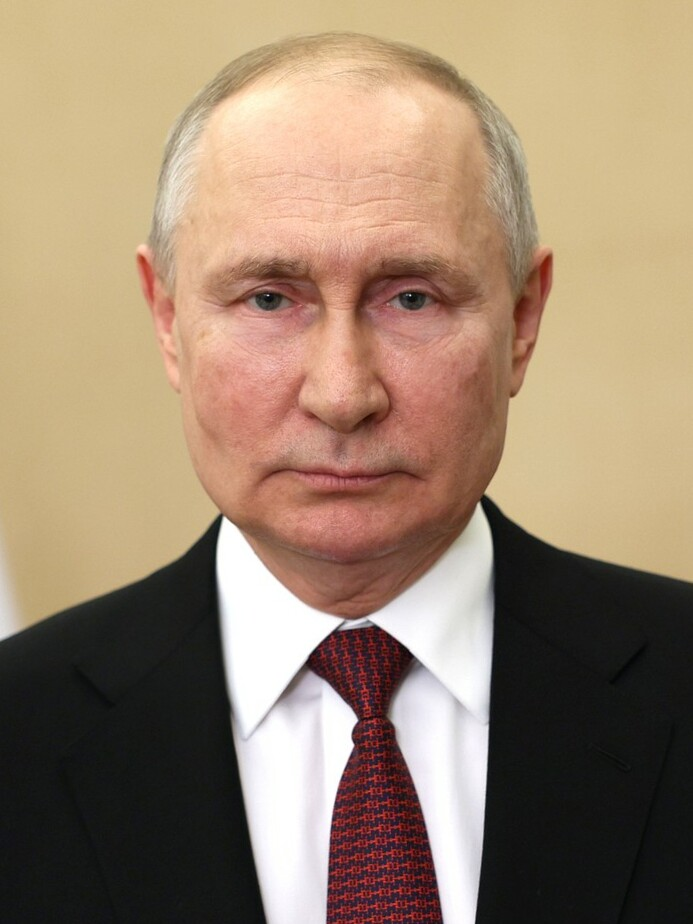
Russia
Vladimir Putin, President

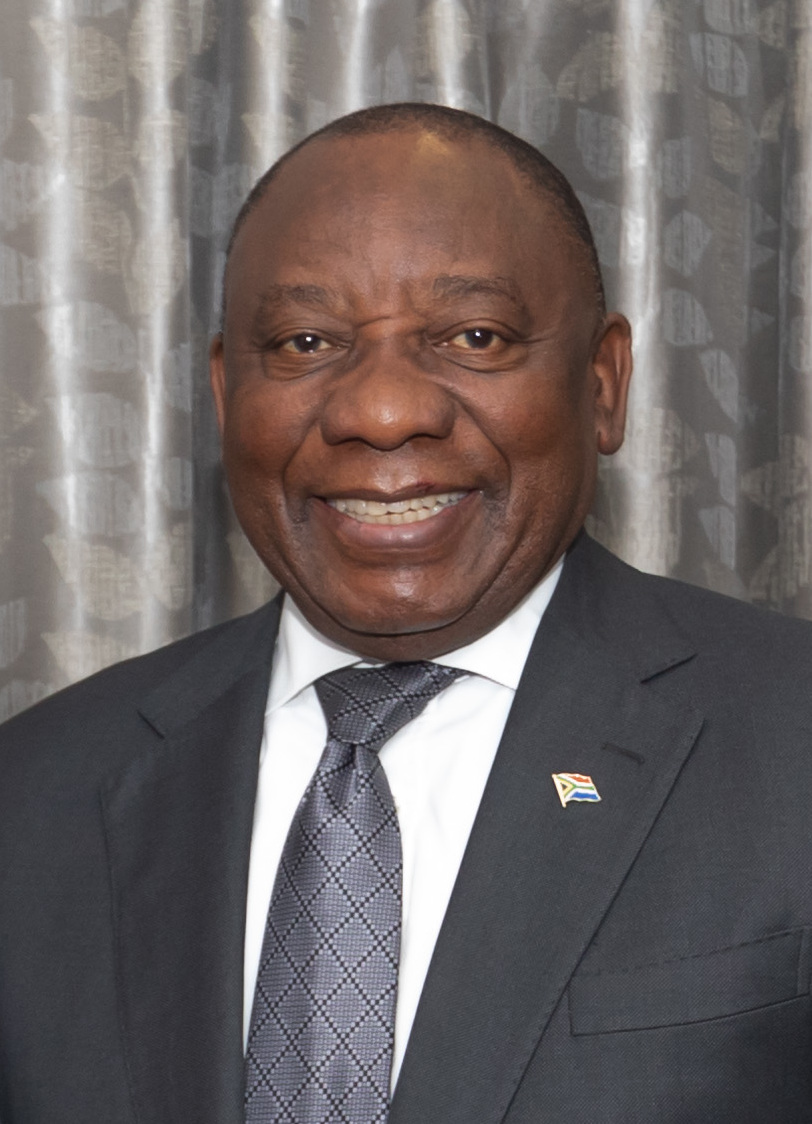
South Africa
Cyril Ramaphosa, President 2020 Chairperson of the African Union

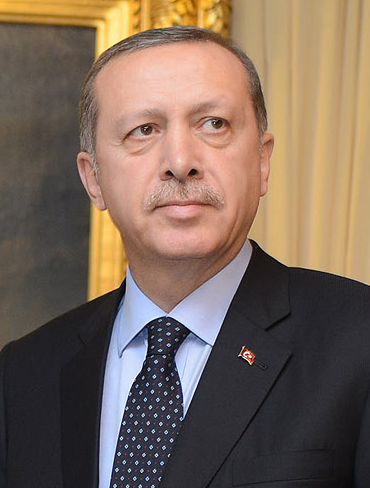
Turkey
Recep Tayyip Erdoğan, President

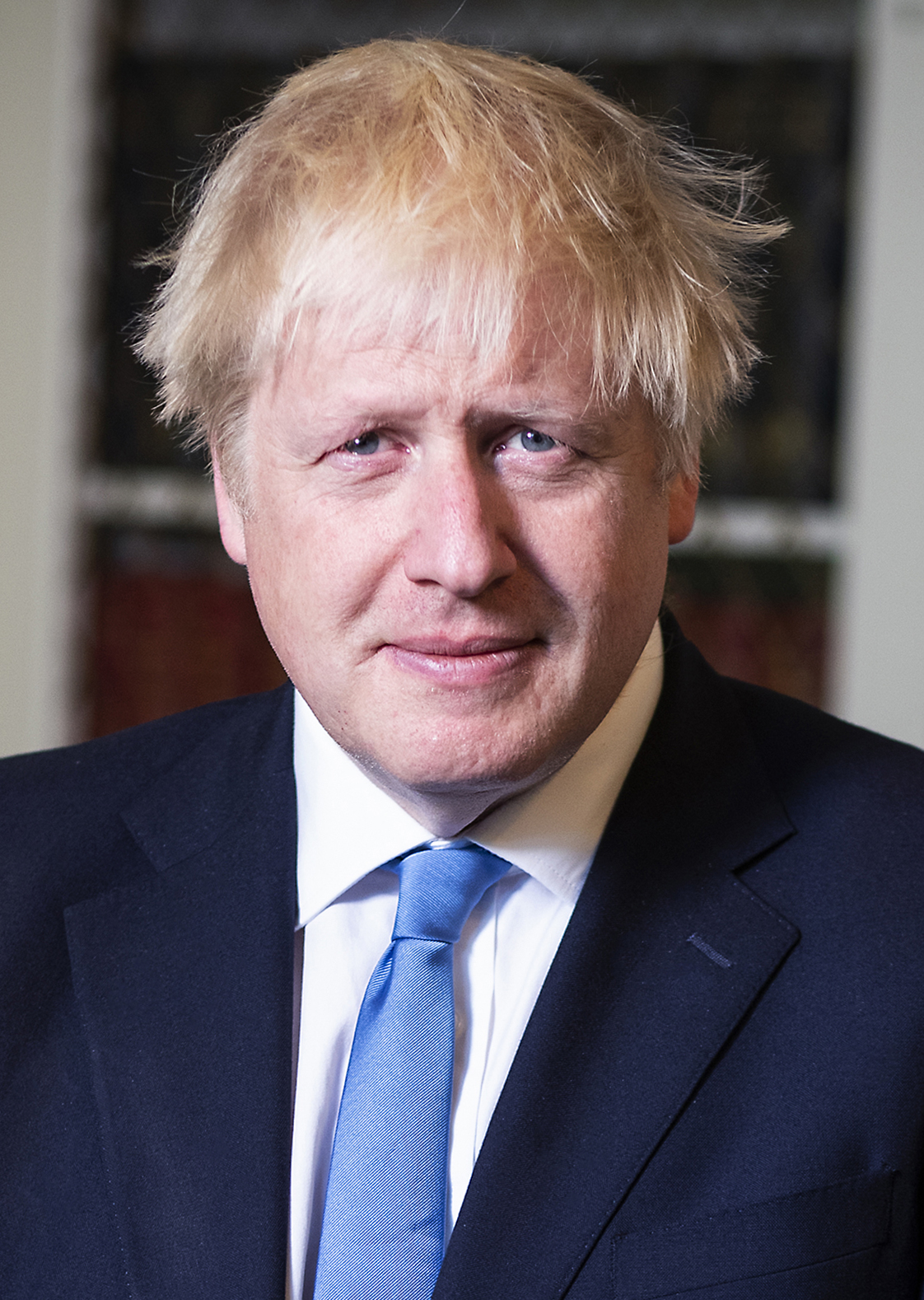
United Kingdom
Boris Johnson, Prime Minister

United States
Donald Trump, President

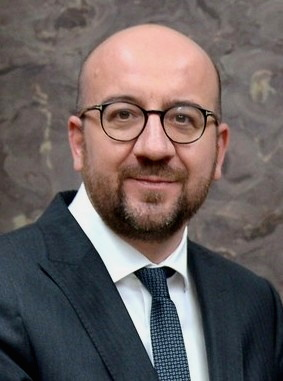
European Union
Charles Michel, President of the European Council

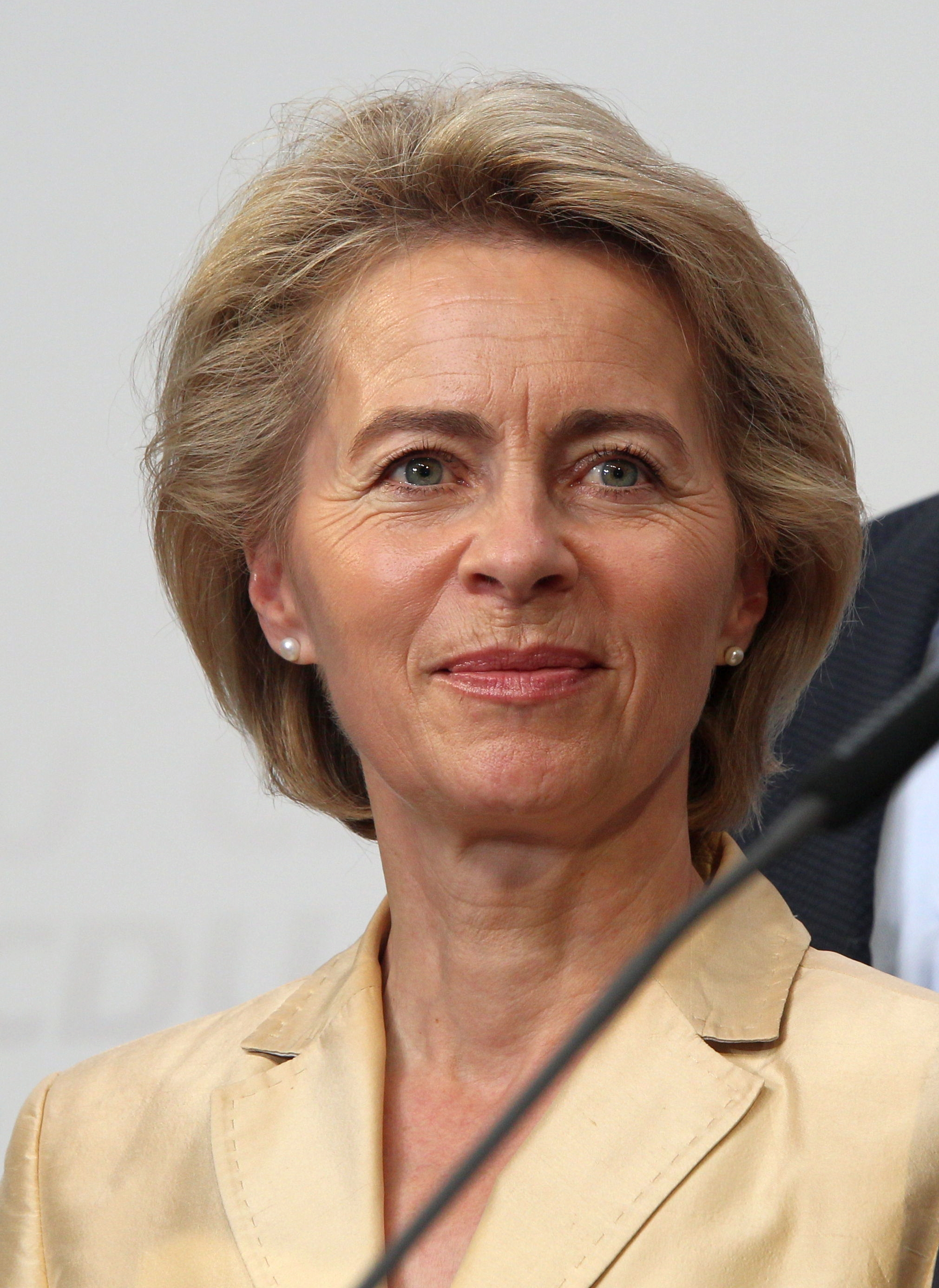
European Union
Ursula von der Leyen, President of the European Commission

== Invited guests ==
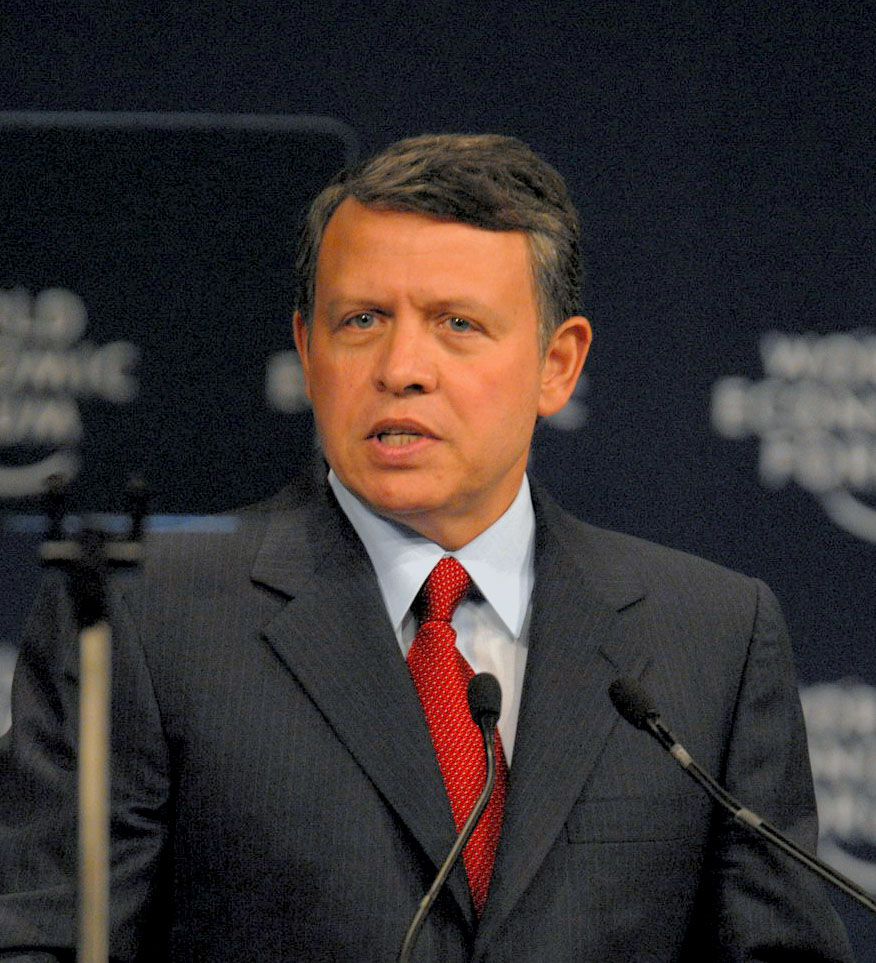
Jordan
Abdullah II, King, Guest invitee

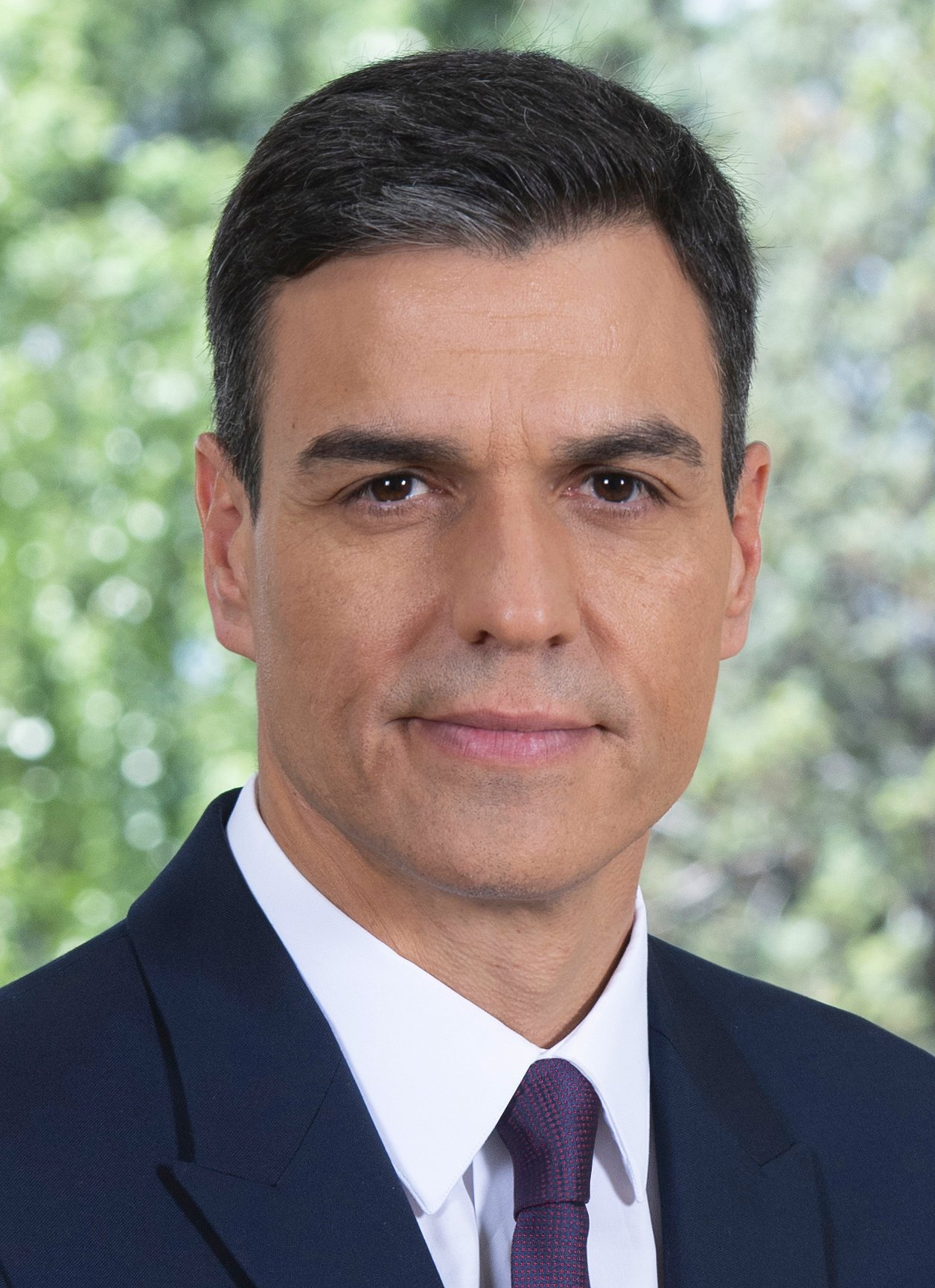
Spain
Pedro Sánchez, Prime Minister Permanent guest invitee

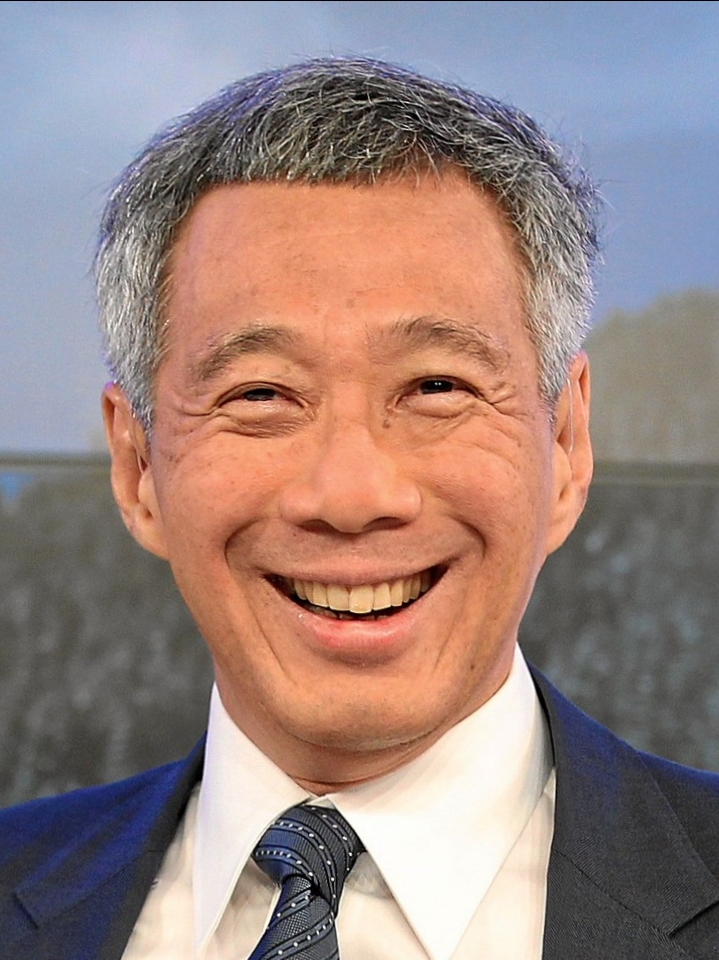
Singapore
Lee Hsien Loong, Prime Minister Guest invitee

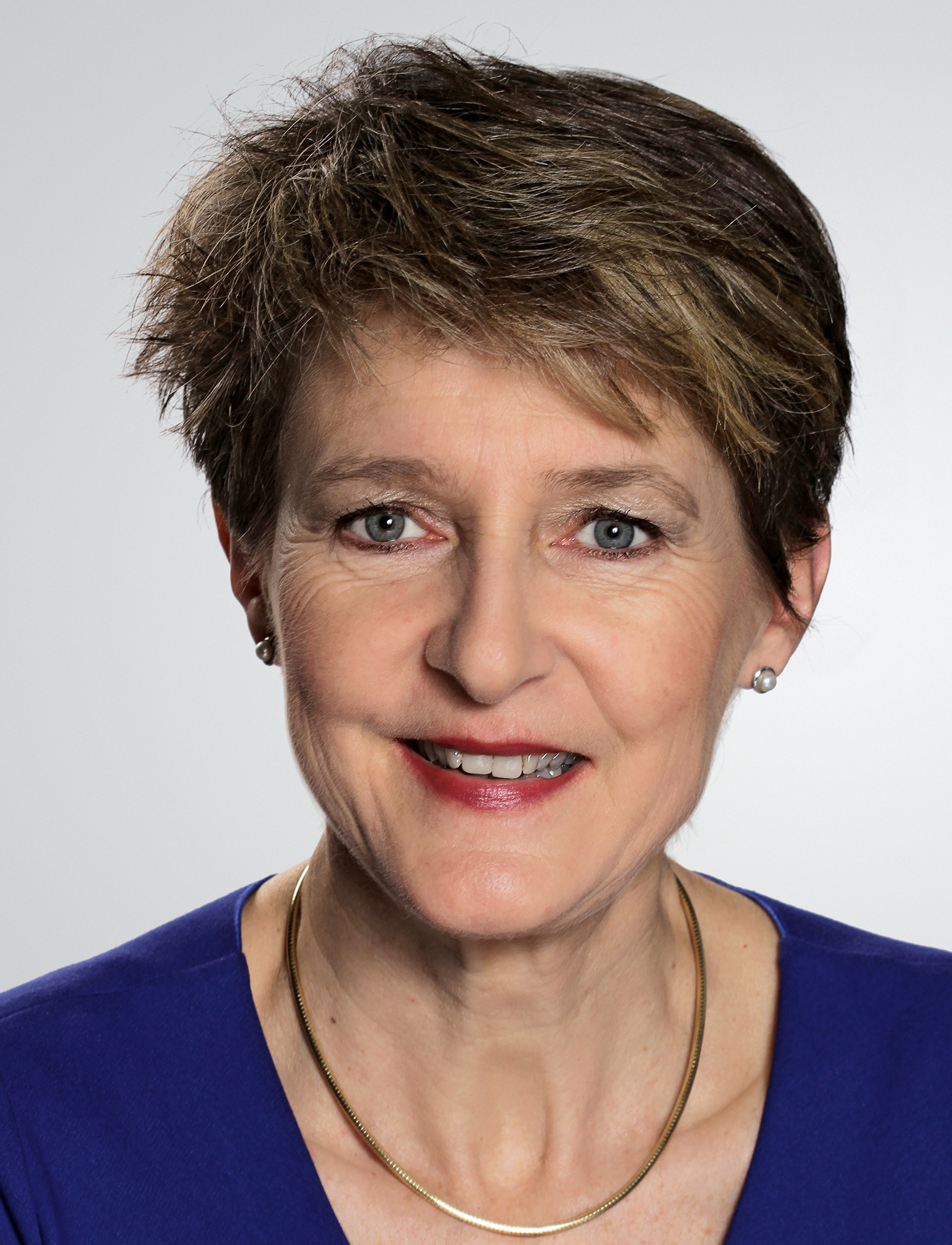
Switzerland
Simonetta Sommaruga, President Guest invitee

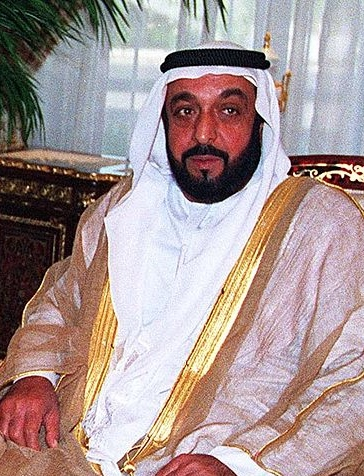
United Arab Emirates
Khalifa bin Zayed Al Nahyan, President 2020 Chairperson of the Gulf Cooperation Council

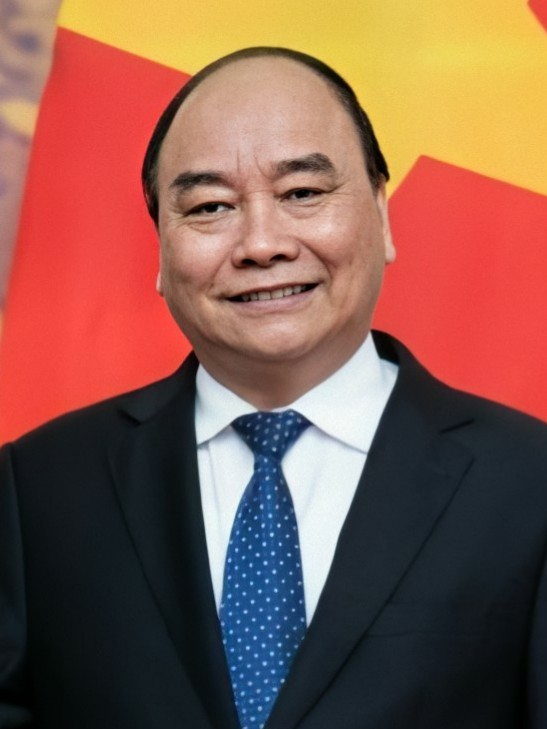
Vietnam
Nguyễn Xuân Phúc, Prime Minister 2020 Chairperson of Association of Southeast Asian Nations

== Statement ==
These are the outlines of the summit's statement on COVID-19:

- Commit to taking all necessary health measures to fight the pandemic and protect lives.
- Support economies, protect people's jobs and minimize the economic and social damage from the pandemic.
- Restore confidence, preserve financial stability, strengthen global growth and maintain market stability.
- Minimize disruptions to trade and global supply chains.
- Provide help to all countries in need of assistance.
- Enhancing global cooperation on public health and financial measures.
