= Global Governance Group =

Informal group of smaller and medium-sized countries

- Abbreviation: 3G
- Formation: July 2009
- Purpose: Confer greater legitimacy on the G20; be a conduit linking the G20 to the UN and its general membership; allow voices of its non-members to be heard when and where relevant
- Members: 30 states: Bahamas; Bahrain; Barbados; Botswana; Brunei; Chile; Costa Rica; Finland; Guatemala; Jamaica; Kuwait; Liechtenstein; Luxembourg; Malaysia; Monaco; Montenegro; New Zealand; Panama; Peru; Philippines; Qatar; Rwanda; San Marino; Senegal; Singapore; Slovenia; Switzerland; United Arab Emirates; Uruguay; Vietnam
- Chair: Singapore
- Website: www.mfa.gov.sg

The Global Governance Group (3G) is an informal group of smaller and medium-sized countries with the aim of providing greater representation to its member countries and collectively channeling their views into the G20 process more effectively.

The group was founded by Singapore in 2009 and consists of 30 member countries, the current president of the UN General Assembly, the current president of the G20, and two previous presidents of G20.

The Chair of 3G is rotated among member states.

== Member states ==
- ASIA (9 countries):
  - Bahrain
  - Brunei
  - Kuwait
  - Malaysia
  - Philippines
  - Qatar
  - Singapore
  - United Arab Emirates
  - Vietnam

- EUROPE (8 countries):
  - Finland
  - Liechtenstein
  - Luxembourg
  - Monaco
  - Montenegro
  - San Marino
  - Slovenia
  - Switzerland

- NORTH AMERICA (6 countries):
  - Bahamas
  - Barbados
  - Costa Rica
  - Guatemala
  - Jamaica
  - Panama

- AFRICA (3 countries):
  - Botswana
  - Rwanda
  - Senegal

- SOUTH AMERICA (3 countries):
  - Chile
  - Peru
  - Uruguay

- OCEANIA (1 country):
  - New Zealand

== See also ==
- List of country groupings
