= Deerhurst (disambiguation) =

Deerhurst is a village near Tewkesbury in Gloucestershire, England on the east bank of the River Severn.

Deerhurst may also refer to:

- Deerhurst Resort, a resort in Huntsville, Ontario, Canada
- Deerhurst, Ontario, a community in Bradford West Gwillimbury, Ontario, Canada
