= 36th G8 summit =

2010 international leader meeting in Canada

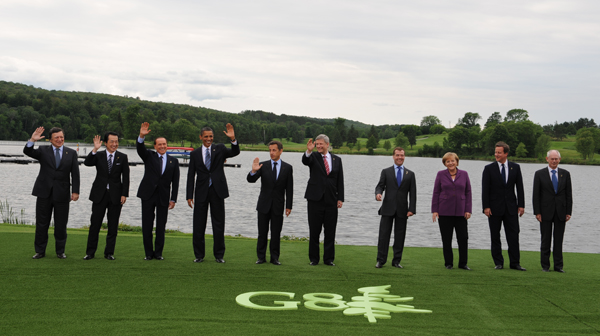
- Host country: Canada
- Dates: June 25–26, 2010
- Cities: Huntsville
- Venues: Deerhurst Resort
- Follows: 35th G8 summit
- Precedes: 37th G8 summit

The 36th G8 summit was held in Muskoka, Ontario, Canada, on June 25–26, 2010. In this year's meeting, the G8 leaders agreed in reaffirming the group's essential and continuing role in international affairs and "assertions of new-found relevance". The form and function of the G8 was reevaluated as the G20 summits evolved into the premier forum for discussing, planning and monitoring international economic cooperation.

This was the fifth G8 Summit hosted by Canada since 1976, the previous four being at Montebello, Quebec (1981); Toronto, Ontario (1988); Halifax, Nova Scotia (1995); and Kananaskis, Alberta (2002). The Canadian government picked Huntsville, a small town of 20,000, to host the annual summit and core meetings. Meetings took place at the Deerhurst Resort. Facilities were built to ensure security and to handle the expected influx of media, protesters and others. Muskoka was deemed too small and a Toronto venue for the G20 summit was adopted.

The late scheduling of a G20 summit in Toronto affected the G8 weekend in unanticipated ways. The meeting came to be framed in the press as a preliminary meeting. The theme for this summit was "Recovery and New Beginning". The G8 summit was an opportunity for a wide variety of non-governmental organizations, activists and civic groups to congregate and discuss a multitude of issues; but the dramatic demonstrations at the G20 summit in Toronto eclipsed protests primarily focused on the conferring G8 leaders.

== Background ==
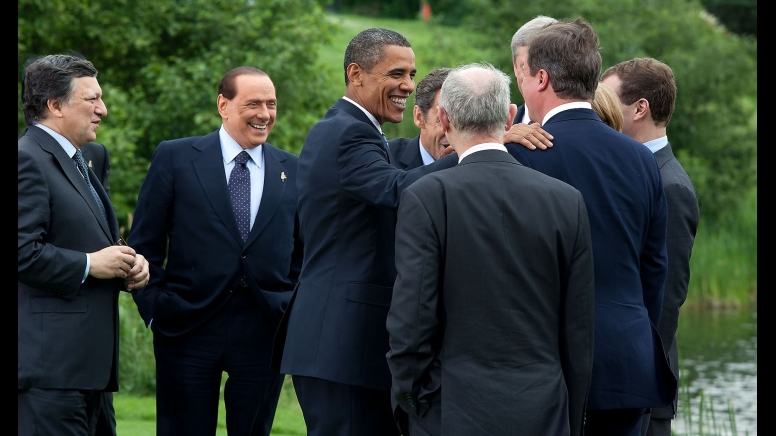
G8 leaders sharing an informal moment outside formal meetings

The Group of Seven (G7) was an unofficial forum which brought together the heads of the richest industrialized countries: France, Germany, Italy, Japan, the United Kingdom, the United States and, Canada starting in 1976. The Group of Eight (G8), meeting for the first time in 1997, was formed with the addition of Russia. In addition, the President of the European Commission has been formally included in summits since 1981. The summits were not meant to be linked formally with wider international institutions; and in fact, a mild rebellion against the stiff formality of other international meetings was a part of the genesis of cooperation between France's president Valéry Giscard d'Estaing and West Germany's chancellor Helmut Schmidt as they conceived the initial summit of the Group of Six (G6) in 1975.

The G8 summits during the 21st-century have inspired widespread debates, protests and demonstrations; and the two- or three-day event becomes more than the sum of its parts, elevating the participants, the issues and the venue as focal points for activist pressure.

The current form of the G8 is being evaluated. Some reports attribute resistance to change among the smaller powers such as Italy, Canada, and Japan, who are said to perceive a dilution of their global stature. Alternately, a larger forum for global governance may be more reflective of the present multi-polar world. The forum is in a process of transformation.

=== Canada 2010 ===
Anticipating the G8 summit, Prime Minister Stephen Harper explained that "Huntsville is a jewel in the Canadian Shield and an ideal location for this gathering of world leaders." When the G8 meets in Ontario in 2010, Harper said, "Our international guests will be charmed by the uniquely Canadian beauty of the region." The summit was one of several events hosted by Canada, with several other international events taking place in the country in the same year, including the 2010 Winter Olympics and the 2010 G20 Toronto summit. The summit was the second time it has occurred with an Olympic event in the same country. The 14th G7 summit was held Toronto and in the same year as the 1988 Winter Olympics in Calgary.

== Planning ==
=== Budget ===
The summit's logo used during the planning stage. The colours blue and green represent the lakes and rivers of the area, while the colour red is an homage to the Canadian flag. The stars honor the 8 participating nations.

In March 2009, summit manager Gérald Cossette projected: "Organizing a G8 event is like moving from a beast to a ballet. Now it's a beast; but by the time the summit unfolds, it's going to be a ballet."

The Canadian government announced in February 2009 that it expected to invest $50 million in hosting the G8 summit.

With the addition of a G20 summit in Toronto, the budget expanded. The total security cost was estimated at C$1 billion, but more specific figures will not be known until the meetings have ended.

==== Local organizing plans ====
At early planning sessions and meetings with his constituents, Tony Clement (MP for Parry Sound-Muskoka) offered tentative ideas about the organizational structure for the area communities as preparations for the 2010 G8 summit in Huntsville begin to take shape. He said one goal was to minimize the footprint and impact of the security details on the local region.

As the organizing process unfolded, some changes marked the evolution of this international event. For example, a wider emphasis on the Muskoka region is presented in the logo associated with the federal government's official website for the summit. Huntsville's G8 logo was selected in early 2009; and some G8-related activities still feature the town's distinctive summit logo.

=== Security ===
Logo of the Integrated Security Unit for the 2010 summits

The summit security was designed with the impact of the precautions on residents in mind. In February 2009, local residents and their representatives were working together to anticipate what it would be like to live through a period of heightened security. The RCMP and OPP were simultaneously conducting security reviews of the area and event.

In the aftermath of the 1997 APEC summit in Vancouver, a Canadian judge concluded that protesters have the right to be seen and heard, which means that visiting leaders cannot be shielded from lawful protests. Canadian officials have determined that this means arrangements would have to be made so that protesters would be visible to those participating in the summit.

== Leaders at the summit ==
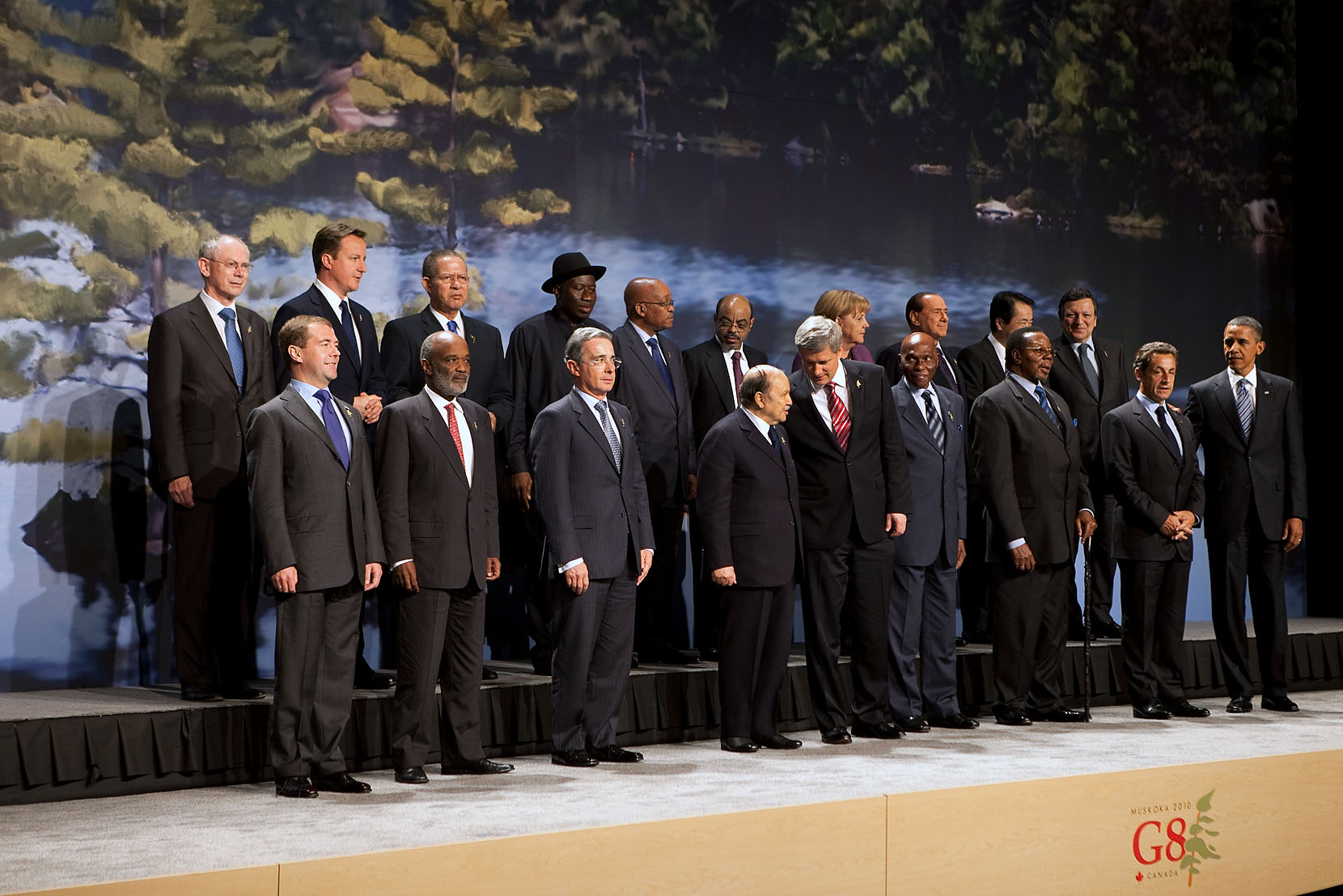
Family photo of the G8 leaders and delegates

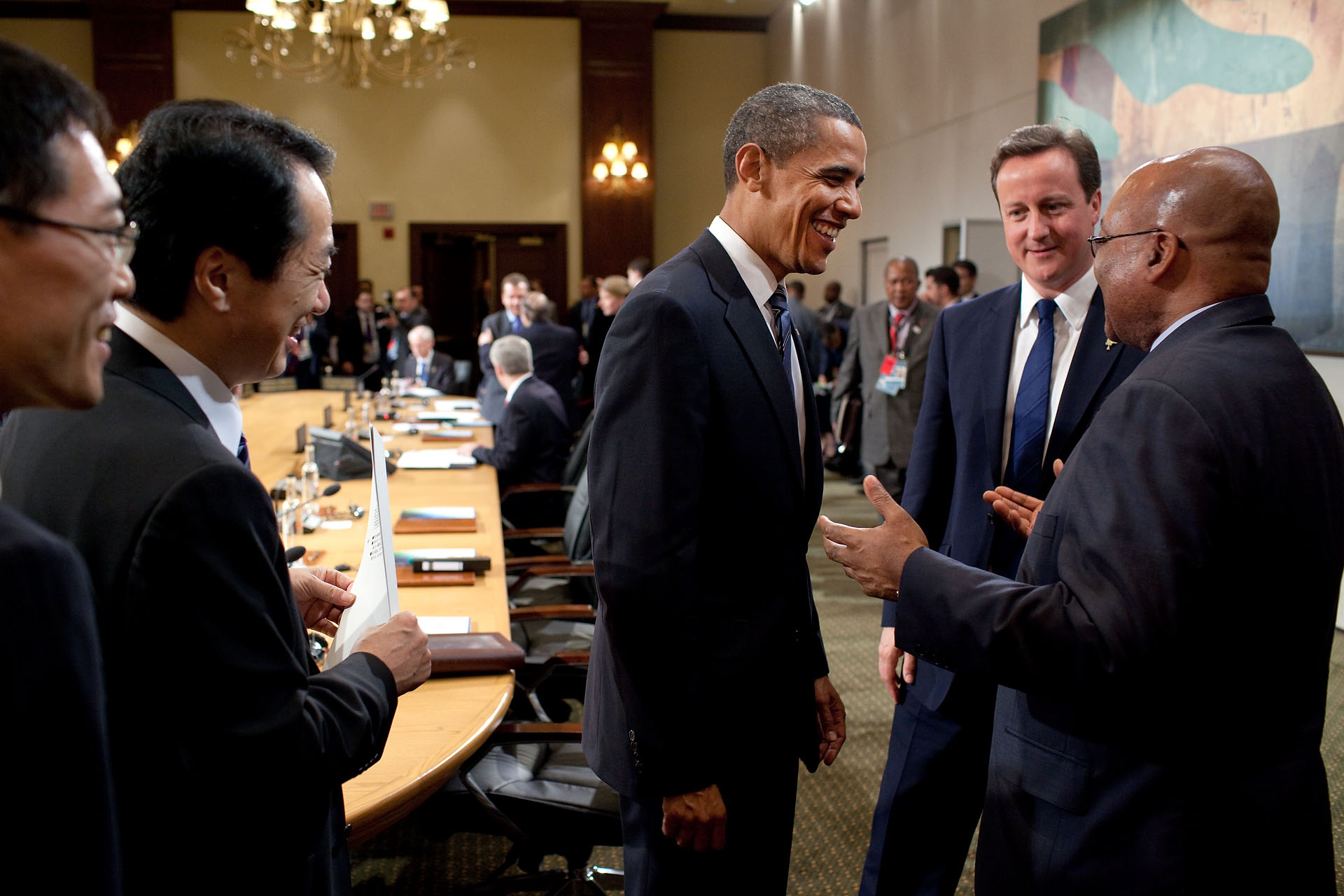
Naoto Kan, Barack Obama, David Cameron, and Jacob Zuma talking at the African Outreach session

The G8 is an unofficial annual forum for the leaders of Canada, the European Commission, France, Germany, Italy, Japan, Russia, the United Kingdom, and the United States.

France anticipates enlarging the G8 to the G14, which would be the G8 plus the G5 (Brazil, India, China, South Africa and Mexico + 1 Muslim country);

The summit included an "Africa outreach" session, and an "Extended outreach" session. In Huntsville, the G8 leaders met with the leaders of the seven African countries and with the leaders of Colombia, Haiti, and Jamaica.

The 36th G8 summit was the first summit for British Prime Minister David Cameron, Japanese Prime Minister Naoto Kan, and President of the European Council Herman Van Rompuy.

=== Participants ===
These summit participants represent the current core members of the international forum:

**Core G8 members** Host state and leader are shown in bold text.
Member		Represented by	Title
(Canada)	**Canada**	**Stephen Harper**	**Prime Minister**
(France)	France	Nicolas Sarkozy	President
(Germany)	Germany	Angela Merkel	Chancellor
(Italy)	Italy	Silvio Berlusconi	Prime Minister
(Japan)	Japan	Naoto Kan	Prime Minister
(Russia)	Russia	Dmitry Medvedev	President
(United Kingdom)	United Kingdom	David Cameron	Prime Minister
(United States)	United States	Barack Obama	President
(European Union)	European Union	José Manuel Barroso	Commission President
(European Union)	European Union	Herman Van Rompuy	Council President
**Africa Outreach (Countries)**
Member		Represented by	Title
(Algeria)	Algeria	Abdelaziz Bouteflika	President
(Egypt)	Egypt	Hosni Mubarak (Note: Was invited but was unable to attend.)	President
(Ethiopia)	Ethiopia	Meles Zenawi	Prime Minister
(Malawi)	Malawi	Bingu wa Mutharika	President
(Nigeria)	Nigeria	Goodluck Jonathan	President
(Senegal)	Senegal	Abdoulaye Wade	President
(South Africa)	South Africa	Jacob Zuma	President
**Extended Outreach (Countries)**
Member		Represented by	Title
(Colombia)	Colombia	Álvaro Uribe	President
(Haiti)	Haiti	René Préval	President
(Jamaica)	Jamaica	Bruce Golding	Prime Minister
**Guest Invitees (International Institutions)**
Member		Represented by	Title
	African Union	Bingu wa Mutharika	Chairperson
(Commonwealth of Independent States)	Commonwealth of Independent States	Sergey Lebedev	Executive Secretary
(International Atomic Energy Agency)	International Atomic Energy Agency	Yukiya Amano	Director General
	International Energy Agency	Nobuo Tanaka	Executive Director
(United Nations)	United Nations	Ban Ki-moon	Secretary-General
(UNESCO)	UNESCO	Irina Bokova	Director-General
	World Bank	Robert Zoellick	President
(World Health Organization)	World Health Organization	Margaret Chan	Director-General
	World Trade Organization	Pascal Lamy	Director-General

== Agenda ==
Traditionally, the host country of the G8 summit sets the agenda for negotiations, which take place primarily amongst multi-national civil servants in the weeks before the summit itself, leading to a joint declaration which all countries can agree to sign. Harper explained at outset,

"As hosts, our government will have considerable say over the agenda. It will be a tremendous opportunity to promote Canada's values and interests; to advocate for open markets and trade opportunities; to assist on global action against global warming; and to champion values like freedom, democracy and human rights and the rule of law."

In early June, Harper was more specific. Canada wanted to focus on the economy, with emphasis placed on reforming the financial sector, and finding European support for plans to return to fiscal stability.

The summit was intended as a venue for resolving differences among its members. As a practical matter, the summit was also conceived as an opportunity for its members to give each other mutual encouragement in the face of difficult economic decisions.

=== Economy ===
Economic recovery from global recession and specifically the European debt crisis were at the forefront of negotiation.

- "Making growth compatible with fiscal consolidation is important not only for Japan, but for all the countries in the G8 .... The G8 showed some level of understanding for this." — Naoto Kan
- "I have made it clear that we need sustainable growth, and that growth and intelligent austerity measures don't have to be contradictions. The discussion was not controversial; there was a lot of mutual understanding." — Angela Merkel
- "No leader contested the need to cut deficits and debt, and to do it in a pragmatic way, taking into account the situation of each country." — Nicolas Sarkozy

A tax on banking institutions, either to ultimately bailout the banks should they fail or as a so-called "Robin Hood tax", a transaction tax which would fuel international aid, was discussed and supported by European countries France and Germany but opposed by the US and Canada, although nothing binding was resolved.

=== International relations ===
The nuclear programs of Iran and North Korea were criticized by leaders, who expressed concern that they might destabilize their regions. Israel too was criticized for its ongoing blockade of the Gaza Strip. North Korea was also criticized for the sinking of a South Korean warship.

- "Iran is not guaranteeing a peaceful production of nuclear power. The members of the G8 are worried, and believe absolutely that Israel will probably react preemptively." — Silvio Berlusconi
- "There have to be consequences for such irresponsible behaviour on the international stage." — Barack Obama, speaking about North Korea's alleged sinking of a South Korean warship

Afghanistan was given five years to reduce corruption and increase security in the country.

- "Making progress this year, putting everything we have into getting it right this year, is vitally important." — David Cameron, speaking on the War in Afghanistan

The leaders at the summit pledged $5 billion toward international aid, less than the predicted $50 billion that was promised for 2010 at the 2005 G8 summit. This money is mostly destined for poorer countries in Africa and Asia. This reduction was seen as a consequence of increased deficits and tighter financial situations in richer countries. As part of the discussion, leaders from Haiti, Jamaica, Senegal, Algeria, Ethiopia, Malawi, Nigeria, South Africa, and Egypt were invited to talk.

== Response ==
=== Protesters and demonstrations ===
Prior to its start, protest groups and other activists were expected to make a showing at the summit. At Huntsville, public protests were small.

Oxfam staged a protest with people wearing giant papier mache heads of the G8 leaders. Oxfam's goal was to put the issue of extreme poverty on the summit agenda, but a spokesman described the Huntsville protests as something akin to "benign nuisance."

Not all demonstrations originated from outside the local community. One 2008 letter to the editor of the Huntsville Forester suggested that the way in which local communities plan for 2010 could be seen as an "incredible opportunity to demonstrate for change in the world:"

"The summit will bring a lot of activity and money .... So, how will we, as a network of communities, move into it? Will the money drive us? Or will we take a larger position by looking to create future-friendly businesses that will continue to thrive long after the summit is over? Will we choose greed or balance as the underlying intent? Intention matters. As the first plans and preparations are being laid, this might be a good time to take steps such as networking with outlying communities and forming focus groups to define some of these goals."

A group of locals urged the G8 leaders to declare water a human right. The group organized a march through the town centre Friday morning.

=== Independent documentary ===
In December 2008, two independent filmmakers from northern Germany began introducing themselves and interviewing people in Huntsville. Their plans included making a documentary on the preparations for the upcoming G8 summit. They also anticipated the impact and after-effects of the event. They hoped to screen the finished documentary at an international film festival

=== Counter-conference ===
A religious counter-summit was planned to coincide with the G8 summit in 2010. The Canadian Council of Churches was organizing the event, anticipating that South Africa's Desmond Tutu, the Dalai Lama, and Prince Karīm al-Hussainī Aga Khan IV would be amongst the internationally known figures who plan to attend the multi-faith conference at the University of Winnipeg. Similar conferences have been held alongside the G8 summits since 2005. Groundwork for this event began when Canada's 2010 venue was announced in 2008 at the Hokkaido summit. Counter-summit organizers projected that it would be difficult for political leaders to ignore the admonitions of the world's religious leaders, even as they might tend to marginalize the protesters who battle police at each G8 meeting.

== Accomplishments ==
The G8 summit historically serves to draw international attention to difficult problems and to reach general agreements, not necessarily as a place to hammer out detailed solutions. Therefore, the accomplishments of the conference are unlikely to be final solutions.

=== Muskoka infrastructure ===
Harper anticipated that "the 2010 G8 Summit will provide short and long-term economic benefits for the region and the province, and would be an exceptional opportunity for Canada to advance its values and interests on the world stage." The real estate industry expected to benefit—for example, cottage owners in the area looked to capitalize by renting their properties to dignitaries. The local Huntsville-Lake of Bays Chamber of Commerce, believed the summit will produce economic spin-off and long-term benefits; but some residents were skeptical.

=== Infrastructure Consortium for Africa ===
The Infrastructure Consortium for Africa (ICA) was established at the 31st G8 summit at Gleneagles (Scotland) in 2005. Since that time, the ICA's annual meeting is traditionally hosted by the country holding the Presidency of the G8—in 2010 in Canada.

== Gallery of participating leaders ==
=== Core G8 participants ===
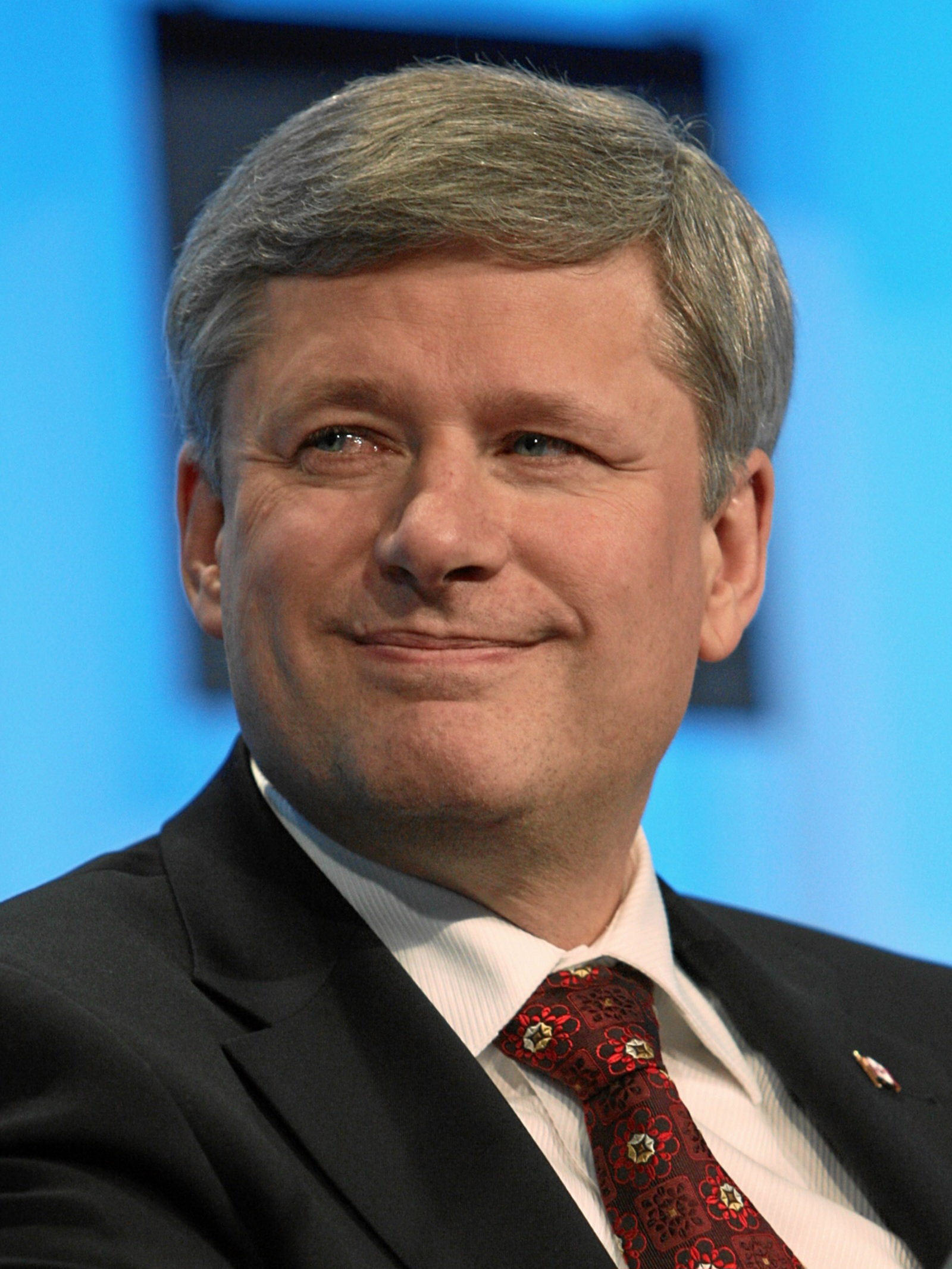
Canada
Stephen Harper,
Prime Minister (Host)

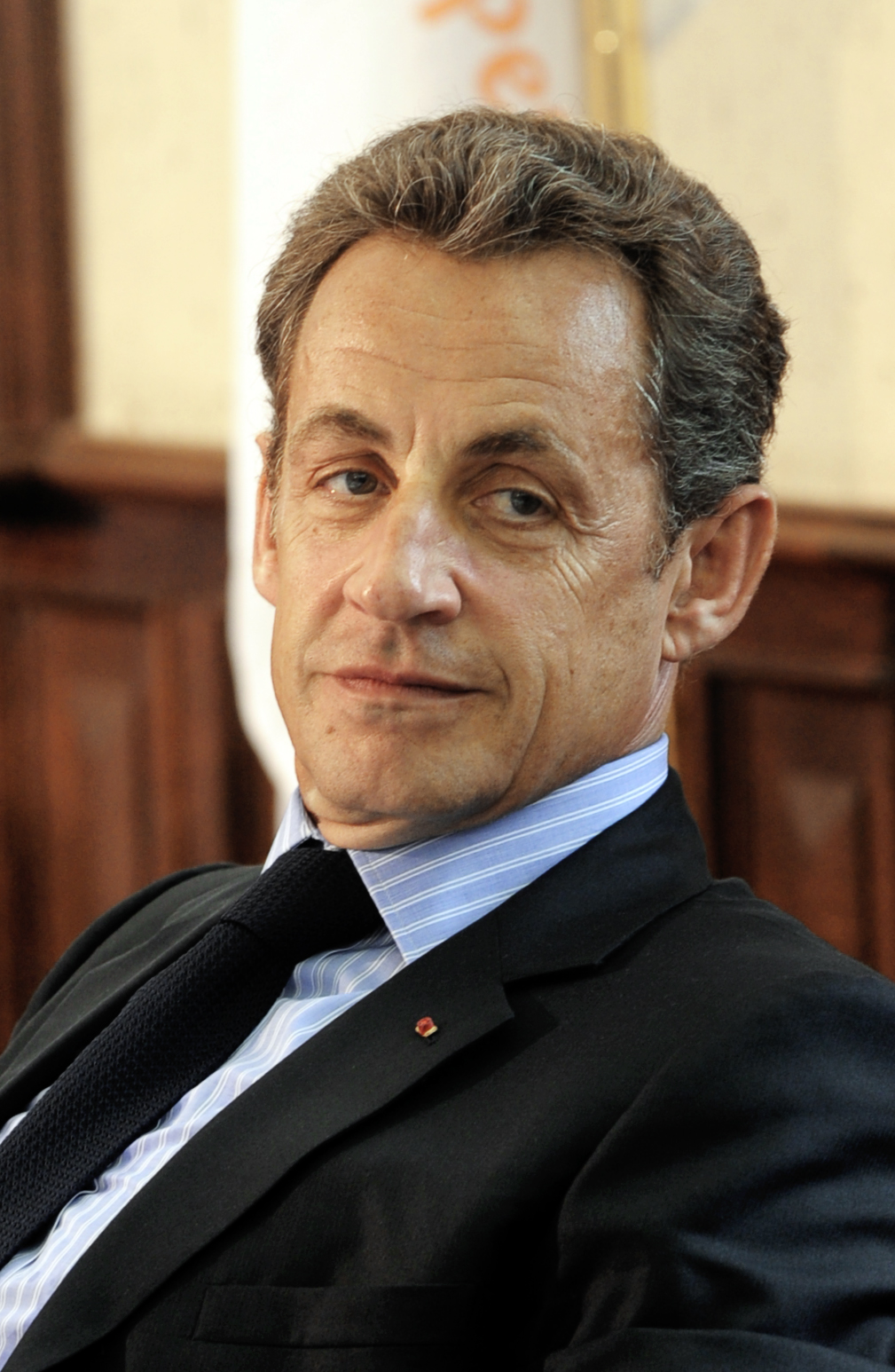
France
Nicolas Sarkozy,
President

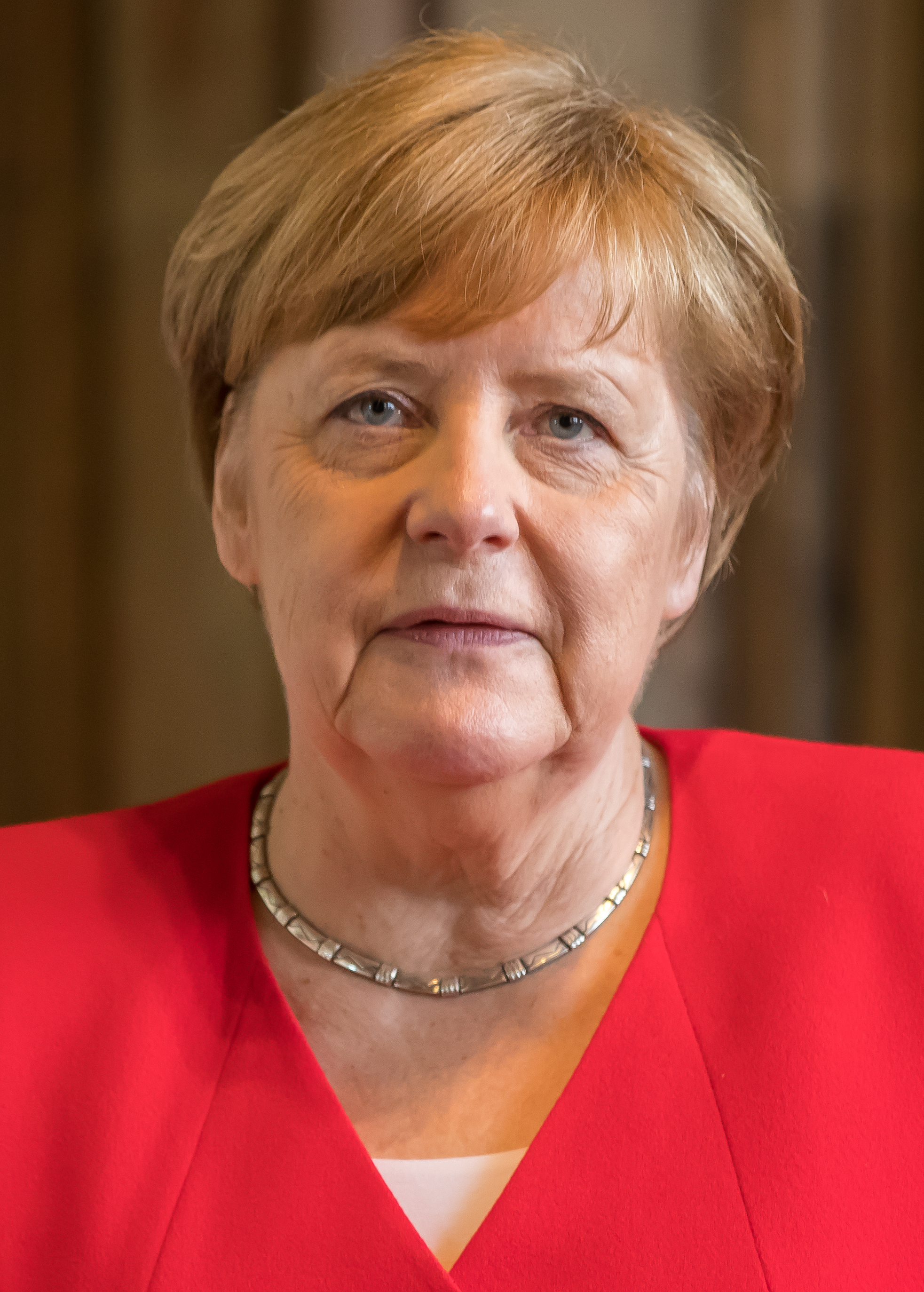
Germany
Angela Merkel,
Chancellor

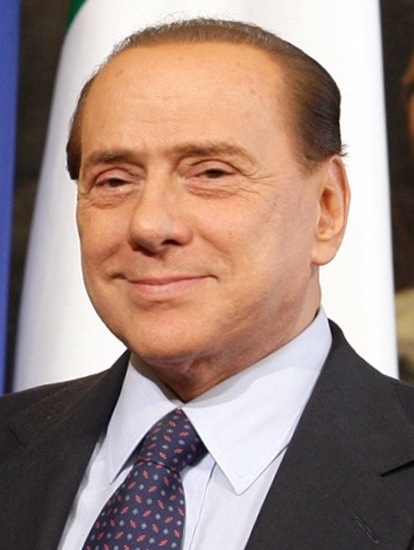
Italy
Silvio Berlusconi,
Prime Minister

Japan
Naoto Kan,
Prime Minister

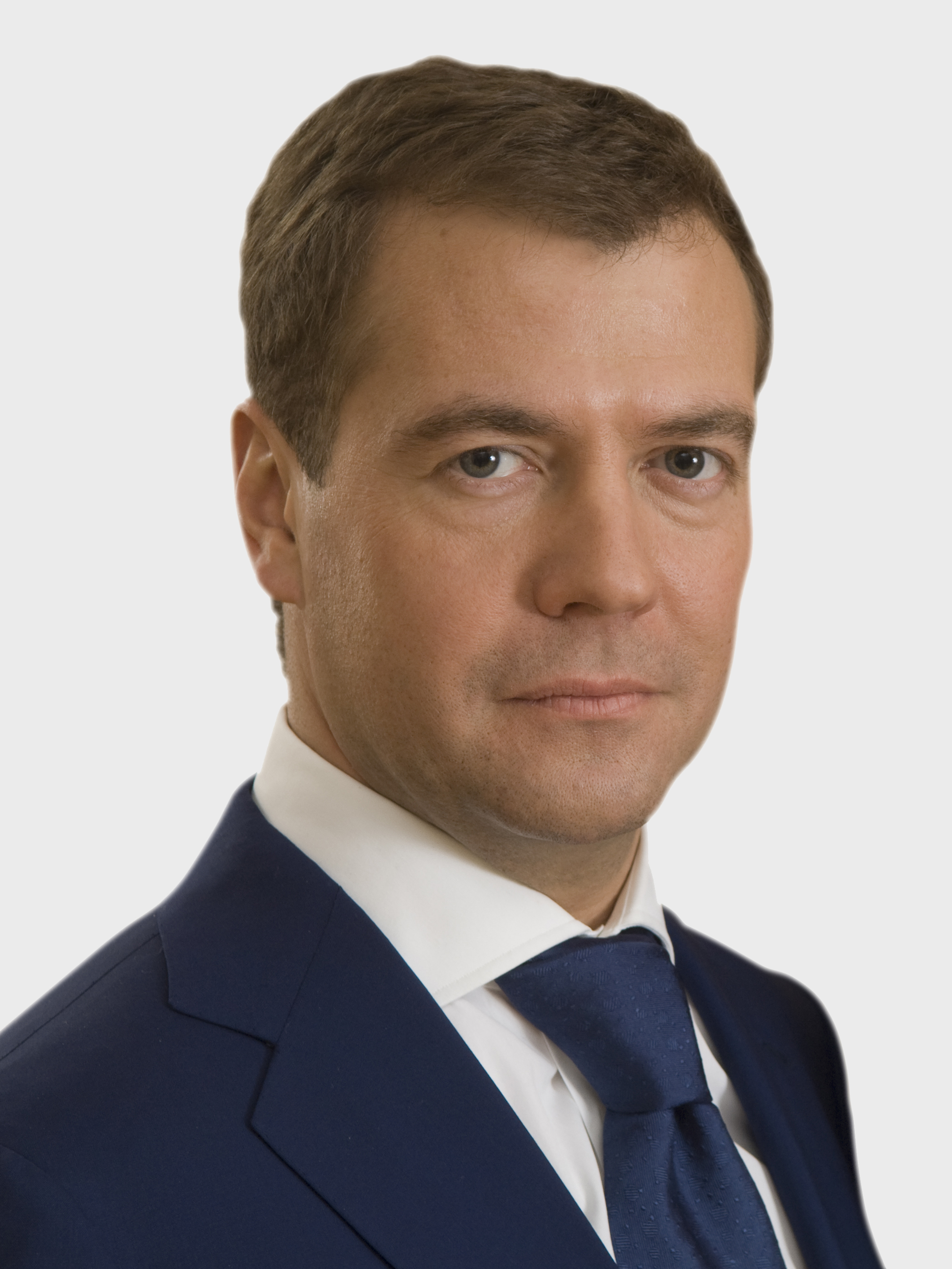
Russia
Dmitry Medvedev,
President

United Kingdom
David Cameron,
Prime Minister

United States
Barack Obama,
President
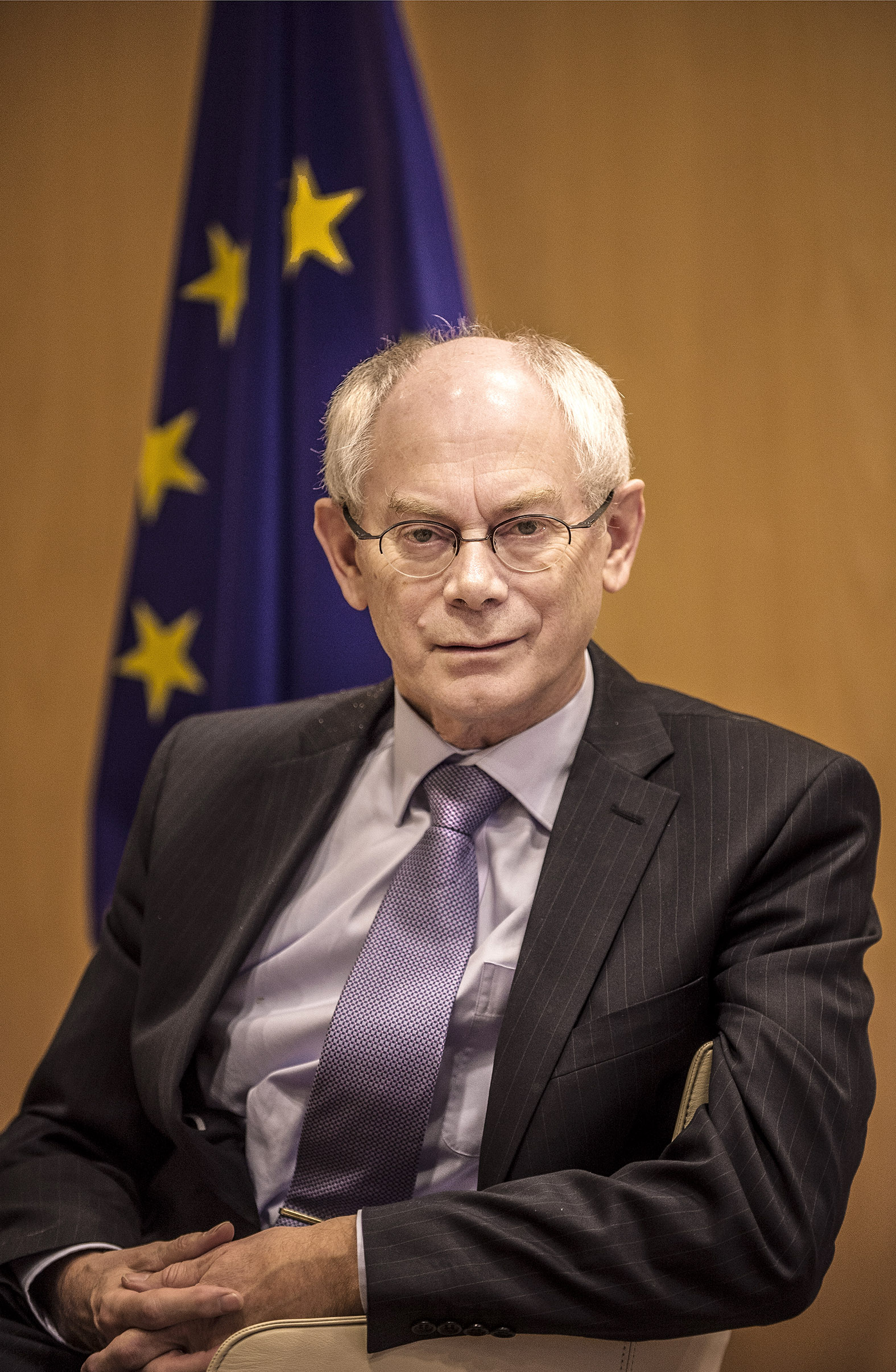
(European Union) European Union
Herman Van Rompuy,
Council President

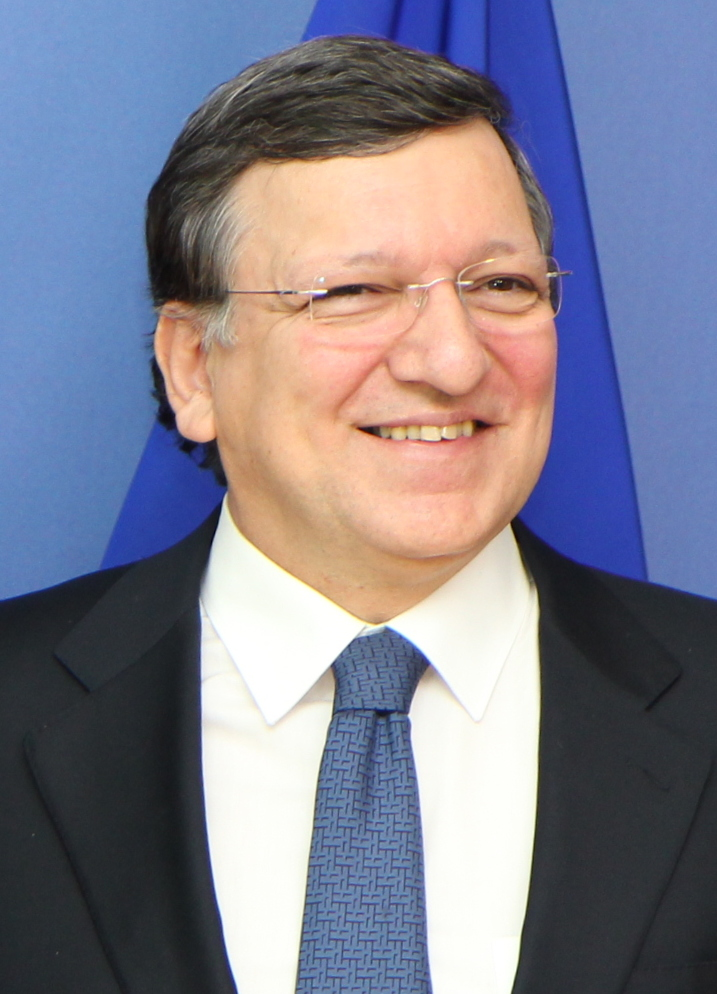
European Union
José Manuel Barroso,
Commission President
