= 2010 G20 Toronto summit =

Governmental economic meeting

G20 Summit on Financial Markets and the World Economy 4th G20 summit
- 26–27 June 2010

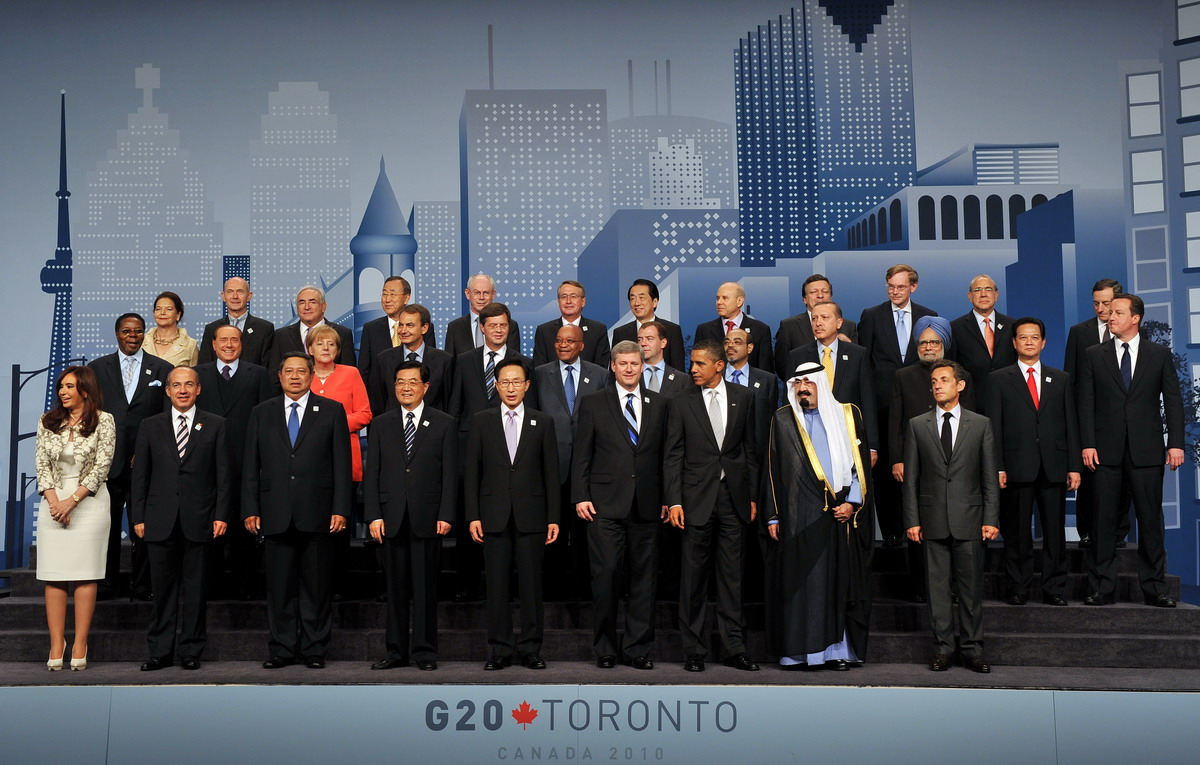
- Host country: Canada
- Cities: Toronto
- Venues: Metro Toronto Convention Centre
- Chair: Stephen Harper

The fourth meeting of the G20 heads of state/government, to discuss the global financial system and the world economy, took place at the Metro Toronto Convention Centre in Toronto, Ontario, Canada, on 26–27 June 2010. The summit's priorities included evaluating the progress of financial reform, developing sustainable stimulus measures, debating global bank tax, and promoting open markets. Alongside the twenty-one representatives of the G20 major economies, leaders of six invited nations, and eight additional intergovernmental organizations also took part in the summit.

Prior to the summit, Canadian Prime Minister Stephen Harper announced that the theme would be "recovery and new beginnings," referring to an anticipated economic stimulus from the impact of the ongoing world recession. Harper initially proposed to hold the summit in Huntsville, Ontario, where the 36th G8 summit was scheduled immediately prior. Organizers later deemed the town insufficient to provide hospitality for the large number of G20 delegates and journalists, favouring Toronto as the host location.

Organizers formed an Integrated Security Unit, consisting of police officers from several regional departments, to provide security during the summit in Downtown Toronto. The event was part of the largest and most expensive security operation in Canadian history. Many hundreds of members of the public were wrongfully detained, some held in inhumane conditions. The total combined cost between the 36th G8 summit in Huntsville and the G20 summit in Toronto including security, infrastructure, and hospitality, was determined to be approximately C$858 million.

== Agenda ==
Many leaders of the G20 disagreed about which issues should be discussed at the summit. The prime focus of the summit discussions was the recovery from the ongoing global recession and the European debt crisis. Summit leaders were divided over which strategies would be best for tackling these problems. The European Union emphasized the need to cut their deficits by focusing on austerity measures. In contrast, the United States emphasized the importance of maintaining economic stimulus spending in order to encourage growth. In summit discussions, the countries of the European Union explained projected reductions in spending and balanced budgets. Alternatively, China, India, and the United States argued in favor of increased stimulus funding to mitigate the effects of recession. Among the specifics proposed by the European Union were a global bank tax and a Robin Hood tax, but the United States and Canada opposed these plans. Other topics of concern were international development and continuing international aid to Africa and other developing nations. Some invitees expressed criticism of Israel's Gaza strip blockade and of the nuclear programs of North Korea and the United States raised issues of corruption and security in Afghanistan.

== Preparations ==
=== Security ===
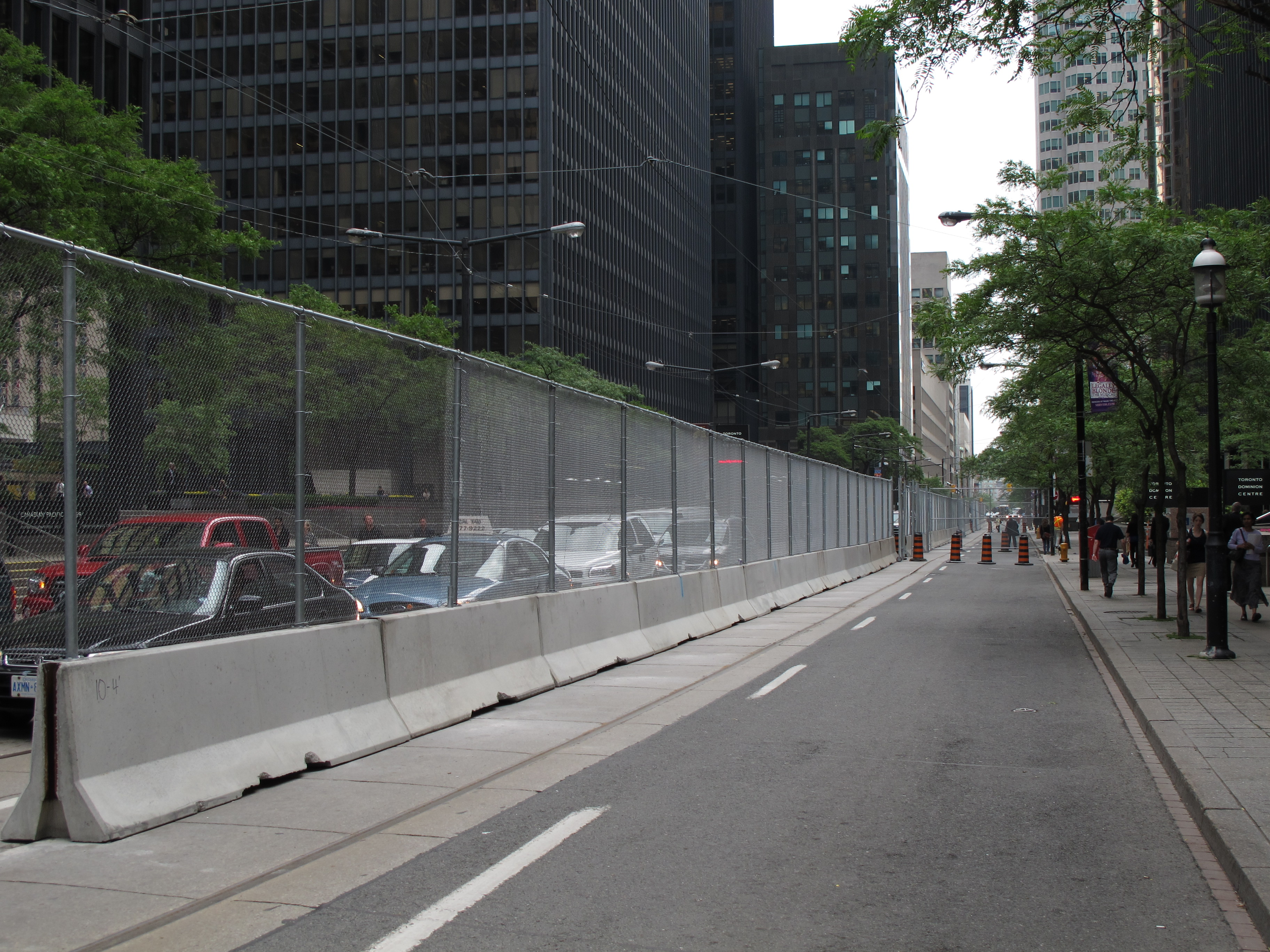
Security fencing erected along the middle of Wellington Street

Security officials began preparing for summit security in Toronto in February 2010. General policing and patrolling was provided by the Toronto Police Service, the Ontario Provincial Police, the Royal Canadian Mounted Police, and the Canadian Forces, while the Peel Regional Police aided in policing at Toronto Pearson International Airport in Mississauga during the arrivals of delegates. The five departments formed an Integrated Security Unit (ISU), similar to the one created for the 2010 Winter Olympics in Vancouver. Additional officers were deployed from York Regional Police, Halton Regional Police Service, Barrie Police Service, Greater Sudbury Police Service, Waterloo Regional Police Service, Niagara Regional Police Service, Hamilton Police Service, Ottawa Police Service, and Service de police de la Ville de Montréal. Calgary Police Service supplied 150 volunteer police officers a week before the summit.

According to an early estimate by The Globe and Mail, 25,000 uniformed police officers, 1,000 security guards from Commissionaires Great Lakes, and several Canadian military forces were to be deployed during the summit. The North American Aerospace Defense Command (NORAD) conducted Amalgam Virgo exercises on May 6 and 7 across the Greater Toronto Area using CF-18 Hornet jets, CH-124 Sea Kings, and CH-146 Griffon helicopters at low altitudes. The total cost for security at both the G8 and the G20 summits was determined to be $1.8 billion, paid entirely by the federal Crown-in-Council, excluding the costs of any possible damage to local business.

The ISU created a security perimeter, beginning with the outer boundary, specifically bordered by King Street to the north, Lake Shore Boulevard to the south, Yonge Street to the east, and Spadina Avenue to the west, where vehicles would be restricted during the summit dates. Residents who lived within the security zone were issued registration cards prior to the summit and other pedestrians who wished to enter the security zone were only able to do so at one of 38 checkpoints, where they were required to present two pieces of photo identification and provide justification for entry. The area surrounding the Metro Toronto Convention Centre itself was fenced and off-limits to civilians and protesters. The 3-metre (10 ft) high fence, contracted to SNC-Lavalin by Public Works and Government Services Canada and installed by two Gormley, Ontario-based companies, was built at a cost of $5.5-million and installation began on June 7. The Toronto Police Service installed 77 additional closed-circuit television security cameras in the area and purchased four Long Range Acoustic Devices which were to be in use exclusively during the summit. The ISU decided on also using water cannons for riot control. The security perimeter even extended into the waters of Lake Ontario and included a Maritime Security Operation with numerous Police vessels and the Canadian Coast Guard Ship Griffon patrolling to discourage international demonstrators from unlawful entry into Canada.

=== Infrastructure ===
A former film studio located on Eastern Avenue was designated as a temporary detention centre for individuals arrested during the summit. Toronto Police Service announced that Trinity Bellwoods Park would be the designated protest area, but following opposition from local residents, police relocated the designated protest zone to the northern part of Queen's Park. Canada Post declared that it would remove post boxes in the security zone. Toronto Parking Authority removed some parking meters as well. Small trees along sidewalks around the convention centre were removed to prevent them from being used as weapons by protesters. Other removed municipal properties include 745 newspaper boxes, 200 public trash cans, 70 mailboxes, 29 bus shelters, and 5 public information boards.

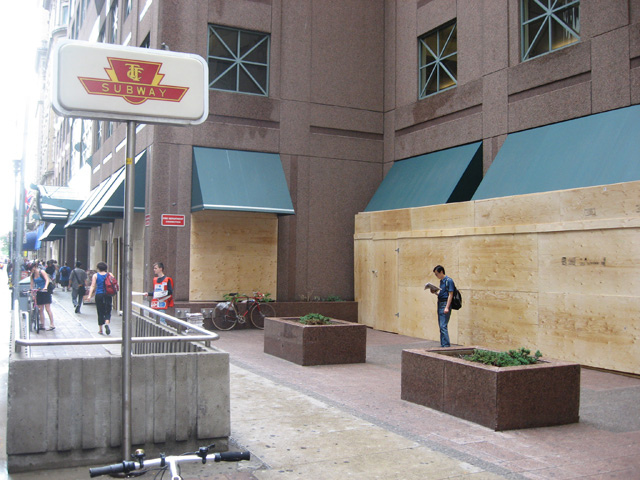
Shops near King subway station boarded up windows to prevent vandalism from protests

Canada's largest banks, which are headquartered in Downtown Toronto, made plans to have employees work at alternate sites outside their downtown facilities, such as at home or in other branches. The Liquor Control Board of Ontario (LCBO) announced the closure of seven liquor stores in the downtown core during the summit as a precaution to looting. The PATH, CN Tower, University of Toronto, Art Gallery of Ontario, and the Ontario Legislative Building were also closed to public during the summit dates.

A three-game Major League Baseball series between the Toronto Blue Jays and the Philadelphia Phillies, scheduled June 25 to 27 at the Rogers Centre, was relocated to Citizens Bank Park in Philadelphia, after much discussion by league officials and amidst discontentment from fans, who highly anticipated the return of former Blue Jays pitcher Roy Halladay to Toronto after being traded to the Phillies; because the American League Blue Jays was still officially the "home" team, the series marked the first time in Major League history that the designated hitter was used in a National League ballpark during the regular season. Mirvish Productions cancelled performances of two musicals at its theatres, Rock of Ages and Mamma Mia!, during the week of the summit. Similarly, the Factory Theatre cancelled shows during the summit week.

Highway 427 and the Gardiner Expressway, the route from Toronto Pearson International Airport in Mississauga to the Convention Centre in downtown, periodically closed down for motorcades, and police jammed wireless reception along the two highways. Exits to Yonge Street and Bay Street from the Gardiner Expressway were closed during the summit dates. Toronto Transit Commission announced that subway stations near the convention centre would remain open and operational, despite some detoured bus routes and the closure of Queens Quay Station. Via Rail announced that it would not operate at Union Station during the summit dates, instead providing shuttle bus service from the Yorkdale and Scarborough Centre bus terminals to the Brampton and Oshawa stations respectively. Nav Canada announced that it would place restrictions on the airspace in Toronto, making it limited to commercial flights only while all others would be restricted within a 30-nautical-mile (56 km) radius. Porter Airlines received permission to continue flights to and from Billy Bishop Toronto City Airport. The Toronto District School Board and Toronto Catholic District School Board cancelled school bus services to six Downtown schools on June 25, affecting 45,000 students, 10,000 of whom were physically disabled.

Summit organizers established a media centre for international media personnel, journalists, and press reporters at the Direct Energy Centre at the Exhibition Place. The Federal and Ontario governments constructed a 20,000-square-foot (1,858 m^{2}) pavilion, called Experience Canada or Canadian Corridor in the media centre to promote Canadian tourism internationally. The pavilion included three life-sized government-funded displays: Cityscape, which showcased successful Canadian businesses and innovation; The Bridge, which included information kiosks for media personnel as well as large high-definition screens that televised the 2010 FIFA World Cup games; and Northern Ontario Oasis, an artificial lakefront based on Muskoka region's cottage country. The Northern Ontario Oasis included donated canoes, a shoreline with deck chairs for journalists to cool off, and a mobile phone recharging station. The background was a large screen that portrayed various images of the Muskoka region. The cost of the international media centre, the Experience Canada pavilion, and artificial lake, which were $23 million, $1.9 million, and $57,000 respectively, was the target of controversies.

== Attendance ==
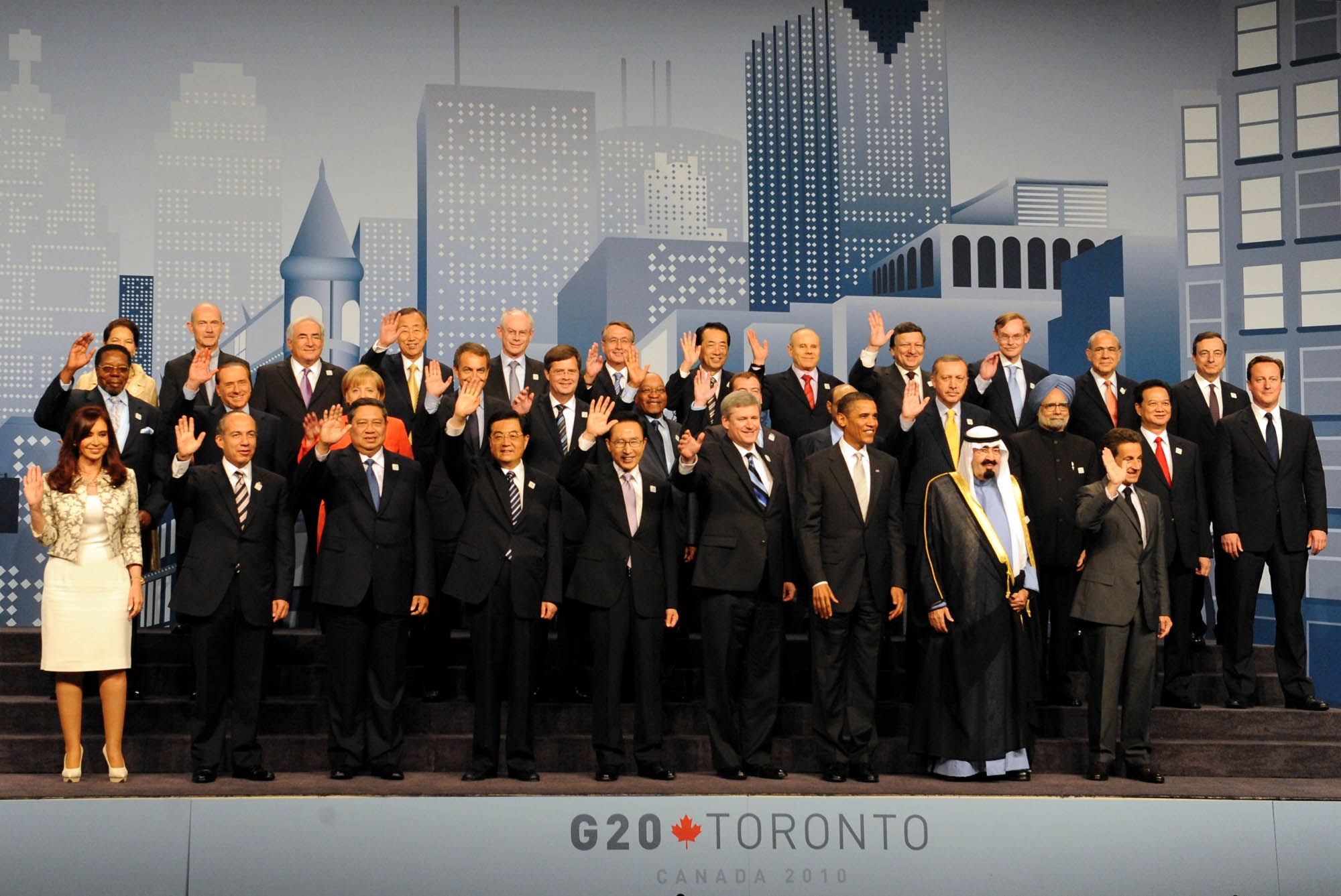
Leaders pose for a group photo at the Metro Toronto Convention Centre

Participants of the Toronto summit were announced by Stephen Harper on May 8, 2010. Harper extended invitations to the leaders of Ethiopia and Malawi to further represent the continent of Africa along with South Africa, a G20 member. He also invited leaders of the Netherlands, Spain, Vietnam, and Nigeria.

Toronto Pearson International Airport was the port of entry for delegates attending both the G8 and G20 summits. French president Nicolas Sarkozy and Chinese president Hu Jintao were the first of the G20 leaders to arrive. The arrival of Hu coincided with his state visit to Canada, hosted by Governor General of Canada Michaëlle Jean in Ottawa. Presidents Jacob Zuma of South Africa and Goodluck Jonathan of Nigeria arrived on June 24. British prime minister David Cameron arrived on June 25, following a short visit in Halifax to celebrate the centennial of the Canadian Forces Maritime Command. Remaining leaders with the G8 also arrived on the same day.

The Organisation for Economic Co-operation and Development and the International Labour Organization, as well as Ethiopia, Malawi, Nigeria, and Vietnam made their first G20 summit appearances in Toronto. Recently designated heads of government, namely Cameron and Japanese prime minister Naoto Kan, made the G8 and G20 summits their first international conferences. Australia's deputy prime minister, Wayne Swan, attended the summit on behalf of Julia Gillard, whose appointment as prime minister occurred on June 24. Brazilian president Luiz Inácio Lula da Silva cancelled his trip to remain in his country due to the then-recent flooding in Northeastern Brazil; in his place, Guido Mantega, Brazil's finance minister, headed the nation's delegation. After the G8 summit in Huntsville, Ontario ended, Cameron, whose aircraft was grounded due to weather conditions, shared transportation to Toronto in Marine One with US President, Barack Obama.

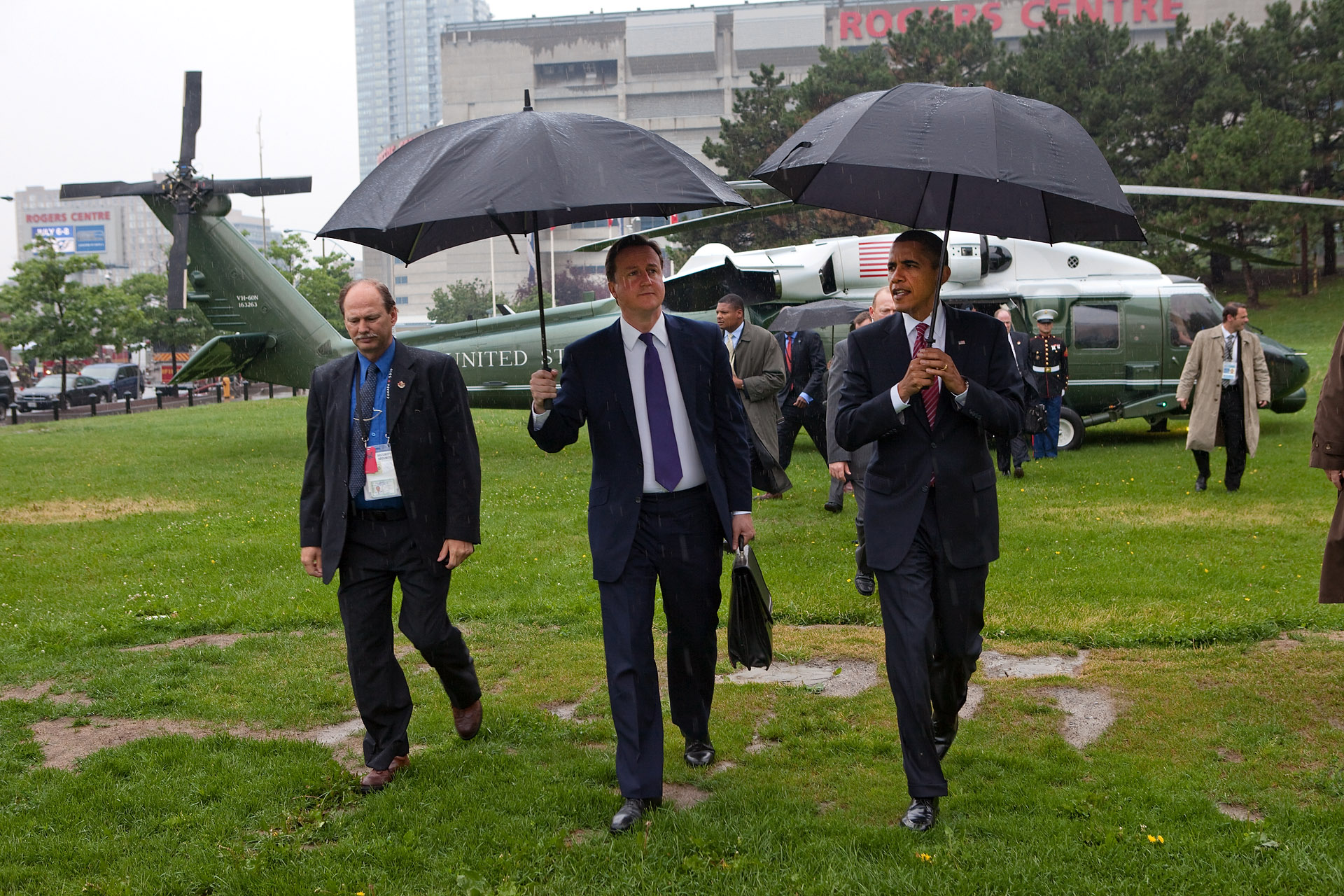
Barack Obama (right) and David Cameron (centre) arrive after travelling together on Marine One from Huntsville

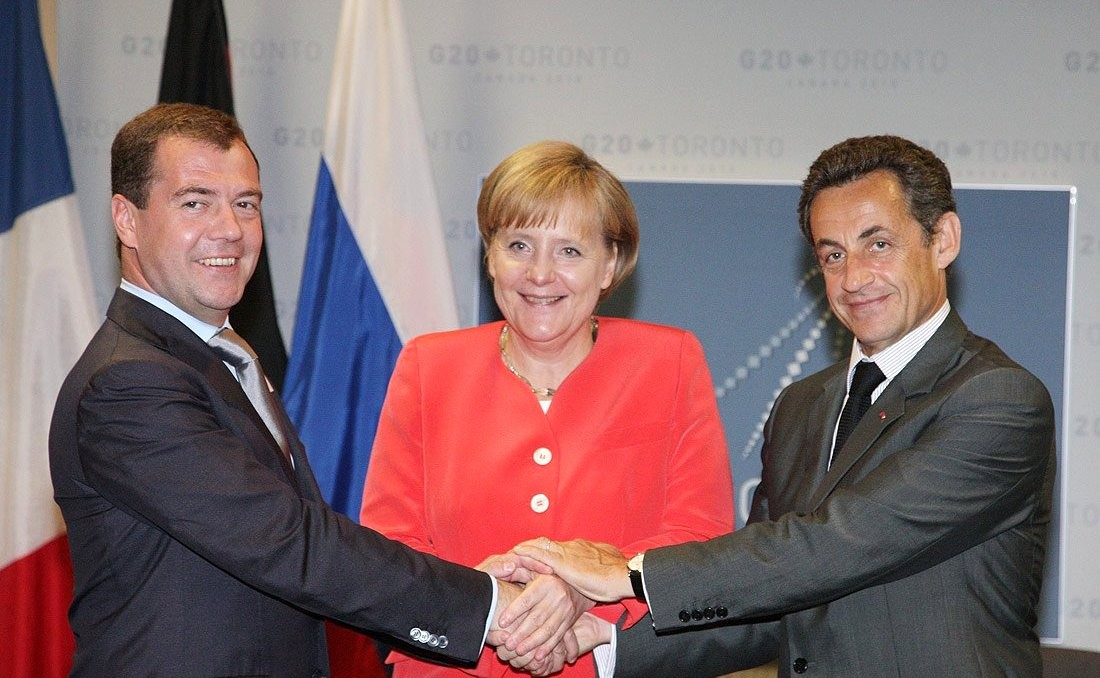
Dmitry Medvedev shaking hands with Angela Merkel and Nicolas Sarkozy

**G20 members**; Host nation and leader are indicated in bold text
Member		Represented by	Title
(Argentina)	Argentina	Cristina Fernández de Kirchner	President
(Australia)	Australia	Wayne Swan	Deputy Prime Minister
(Brazil)	Brazil	Guido Mantega	Finance Minister
(Canada)	**Canada**	**Stephen Harper**	**Prime Minister**
(China)	People's Republic of China	Hu Jintao	President and General Secretary (Note: The presidentship of China is legally a ceremonial office, but the General Secretary of the Chinese Communist Party (de facto leader) has always held this office since 1993, except for the months of transition. Both of the roles also lead the Central Military Commission. The paramount leader was President Hu Jintao.)
(France)	France	Nicolas Sarkozy	President
(Germany)	Germany	Angela Merkel	Chancellor
(India)	India	Manmohan Singh	Prime Minister
(Indonesia)	Indonesia	Susilo Bambang Yudhoyono	President
(Italy)	Italy	Silvio Berlusconi	Prime Minister
(Japan)	Japan	Naoto Kan	Prime Minister
(Mexico)	Mexico	Felipe Calderón	President
(Russia)	Russian Federation	Dmitry Medvedev	President
(Saudi Arabia)	Saudi Arabia	Abdullah bin Abdul Aziz	King
(South Africa)	South Africa	Jacob Zuma	President
(South Korea)	Republic of Korea (South Korea)	Lee Myung-bak	President
(Turkey)	Turkey	Recep Tayyip Erdoğan	Prime Minister
(United Kingdom)	United Kingdom	David Cameron	Prime Minister
(United States)	United States	Barack Obama	President
(European Union)	European Commission	José Manuel Barroso	President
(European Union)	European Council	Herman Van Rompuy	President
Invited nations
Nation		Represented by	Title
(Ethiopia)	Ethiopia	Meles Zenawi	Prime Minister
(Malawi)	Malawi	Bingu wa Mutharika	President
(Netherlands)	Netherlands	Jan Peter Balkenende	Prime Minister
(Nigeria)	Nigeria	Goodluck Jonathan	President
(Spain)	Spain	José Luis Rodríguez Zapatero	Prime Minister
(Vietnam)	Vietnam	Nguyễn Tấn Dũng	Prime Minister
International organizations
Organization		Represented by	Title
	African Union	Bingu wa Mutharika	Chairperson
	ASEAN	Surin Pitsuwan	Secretary General
	ASEAN	Nguyễn Tấn Dũng	Summit President
	Financial Stability Board	Mario Draghi	Chairman
	International Labour Organization	Juan Somavía	Director-General
	International Monetary Fund	Dominique Strauss-Kahn	Managing Director
	NEPAD	Meles Zenawi	Chairman
	OECD	José Ángel Gurría	Secretary General
(United Nations)	United Nations	Ban Ki-moon	Secretary General
	World Bank Group	Robert Zoellick	President
	World Trade Organization	Pascal Lamy	Director-General

== Protests ==
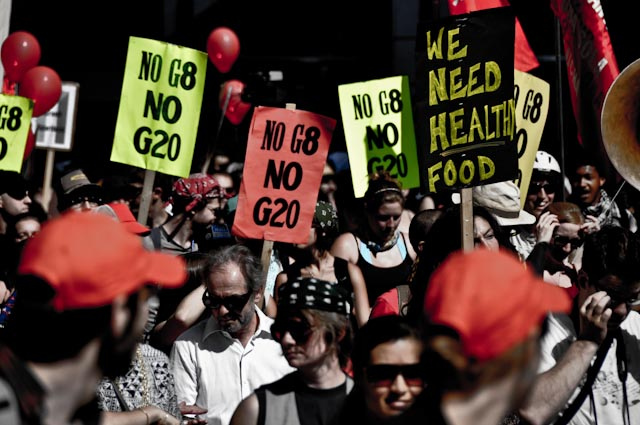
Demonstrators holding signs with slogans against the G20

Major protests occurred in downtown Toronto during the week of the summit, which abruptly escalated during the days of the summit. Early opposition to the G20 included an incident in Ottawa where a bank was firebombed by anarchists, who claimed they would be present during the G20 summit in Toronto. The perceived security threat caused the Integrated Security Unit to increase security measures.

Protests began one week ahead of the summit, organized by groups including Oxfam Canada and the Ontario Coalition Against Poverty. Issues such as poverty, gay rights, capitalism and globalization, indigenous rights, and controversial issues with the summit itself were the object of protests. Despite a few arrests, protests over the week were mainly determined to be peaceful.

As the first day of the summit approached, protesters grew in numbers. Several streets were closed to demonstrations on the debut of the summit. Peaceful protests were followed by black bloc tactics as individuals dressed in black dispersed from the crowd and began damaging the windows of particular businesses across downtown Toronto, mostly fast food chains, retail stores and banks, as well as local businesses. Police cruisers were set on fire and vehicles of media corporations were damaged. Nearby hospitals, shopping centres, and hotels were put in lockdown mode while public transit services were diverted from downtown to other locations.

As security was further tightened and forces increased in presence the following day, protests against police brutality occurred in front of the Eastern Avenue temporary detention centre, where nearly 500 arrested individuals were kept from the previous day's riots. A group of protesters was also "kettled" for around four-and-a-half hours, including a severe rainstorm after black bloc protesters were believed to be in the crowd. Over 1100 people were confirmed to be arrested over the week. The ISU performed sweeping arrests within a specific boundary from the summit venue. Individuals arrested during the protests condemned the treatment they received from police.

Ultimately, a constable would be convicted of assaulting a protestor and a superintendent of unlawful arrest and discreditable conduct for ordering the "kettling" incidents; both received notional punishments and kept their police jobs. In October, 2020, more than a decade after the summit, the Toronto police conceded that "there were times when matters were not addressed in the way they should have been and many hundreds of members of the public were detained or arrested when they should not have been and were held in detention in conditions that were unacceptable." They agreed to pay $16.5 million to about a thousand people they unlawfully detained or arrested in various incidents.

== Outcome ==
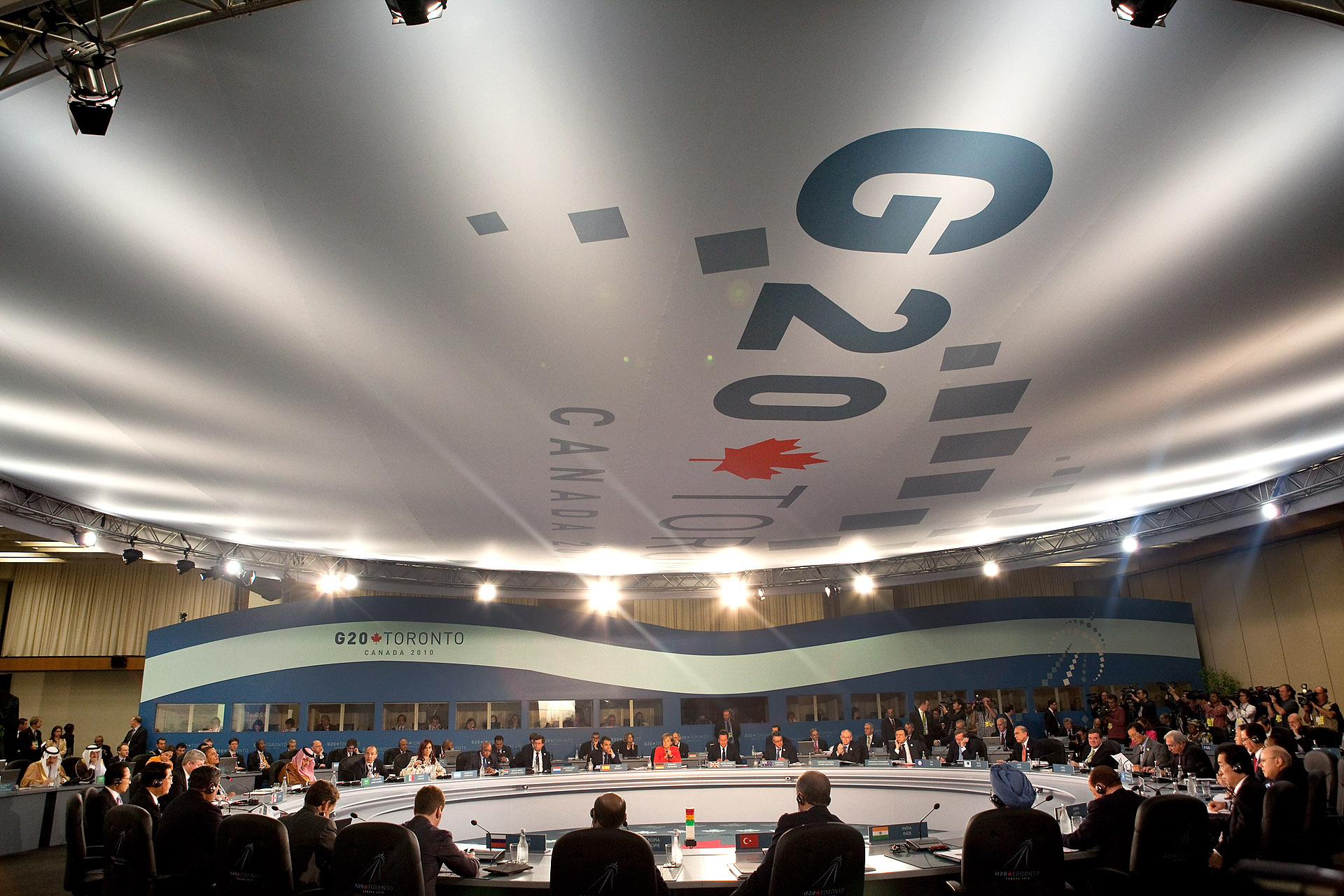
Leaders confer at the Metro Toronto Convention Centre on June 27

Prior to the Toronto summit, it was speculated that it would not see the same outcome as previous summits. This was partially due to most countries' entering recovery mode from the global economic recession after the past G20 summits; thus, the likelihood of new issues being raised was minimal.

During the working dinner for G20 leaders on the evening of June 26, South African president [Jacob Zuma] promoted more partnership between the international community and Africa for the development in the continent. "As Africa we bring to the G20 Summit the key message that we must, together as the developing and developed worlds, promote stronger and more effective and equal international partnerships for growth and development," he remarked.

At the summit, the US president Barack Obama warned that global recovery was still "fragile." In hopes of boosting American exports, he proposed a free trade agreement between the United States and South Korea. A key agreement the leaders of developed nations made was to cut annual budget deficits in half by 2013. The leaders also agreed on reducing debt-to-GDP ratio in each economy by 2016. The debate on imposing a tax on financial institutions was settled as the group agreed that financial institutions would be required to make fair contributions to recover costs from the financial sector reform, but the manner of collecting the contributions would be left to each government. Participants also decided that the institutions would be required to keep a higher amount of financial capital in case of future financial shocks. Climate change and food security were also discussed; the leaders reiterated their commitment to a "greener growth".

The G20 Toronto Summit Declaration, which was released shortly after the summit concluded, stated that "serious challenges remain." According to the document, the challenges include high unemployment rates in various economies and the impact of the 2008 financial crisis. The International Monetary Fund, in its post-summit document, indicated that a speedy cut in deficits may substantially slow growth. In a publication entitled Top Ten Commandments for Fiscal Adjustment in Advanced Economies, the organization insisted that balanced public spending could stabilize bond markets, reduce interest rates from less government spending, and encourage private investment. It also recommended that emerging economies such as China, which has largely benefited from trade surpluses, rely less on developed nations and increase their own spending in order to promote domestic demand.

== Criticism ==
=== Financial costs ===
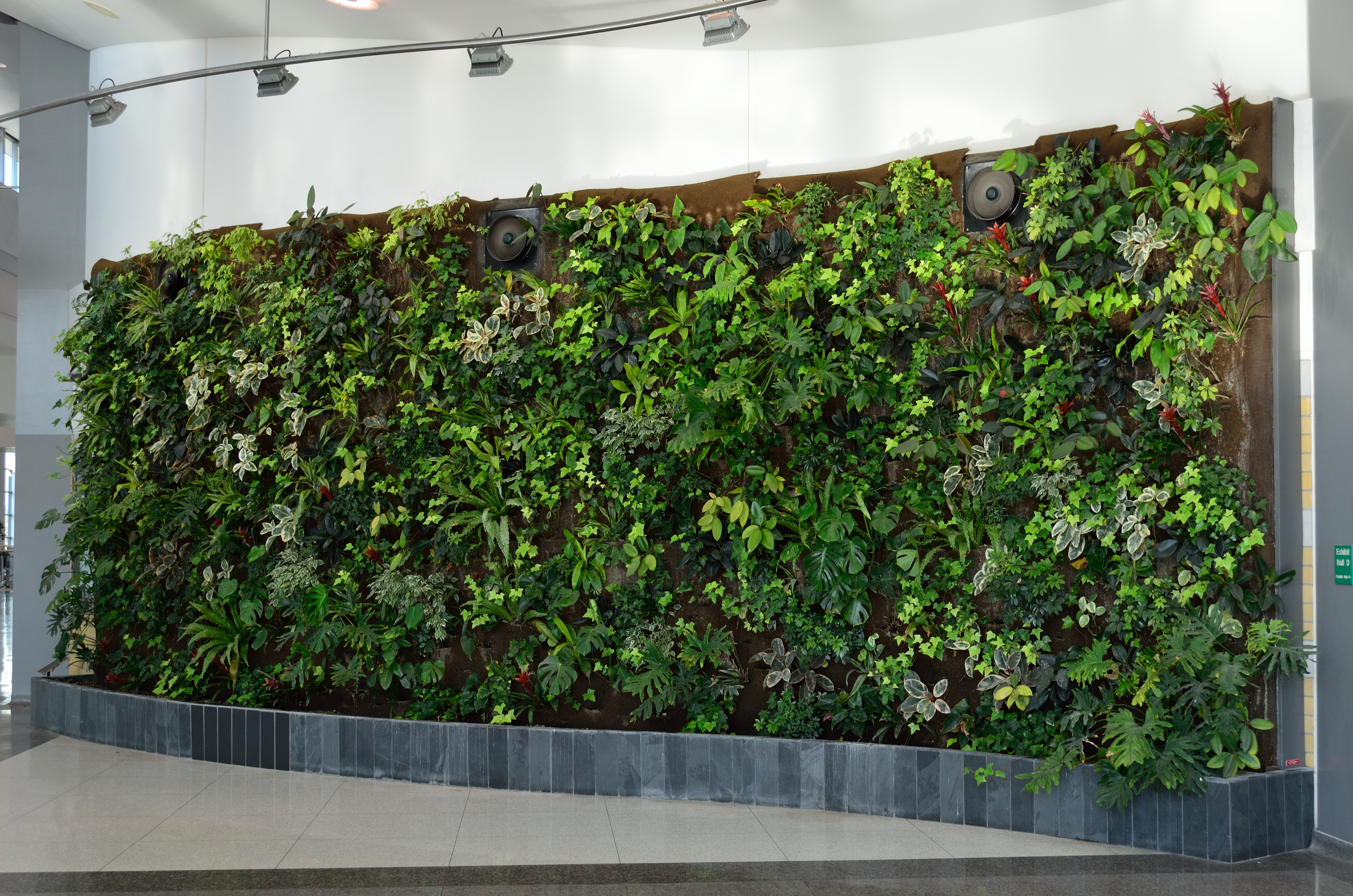
$246,000 was spent on a Green wall for G20.

The financial costs of hosting the G8 and G20 summits was the topic of several political debates and the target of criticism by local groups. The reasons for the large price for both summits were questioned by some politicians and local groups. Members of Parliament Olivia Chow and Mark Holland labelled the initially claimed budget of $1.1-billion for hosting the summits as "obscene" and "insane" while others argued that the money could have been used for long-pending municipal projects in Canada, such as Transit City. The security cost for the two summits was believed to be more expensive than the combined security costs of the 2010 Winter Olympics and Paralympics in Vancouver and Whistler, British Columbia, which were $878 million. However, according to final calculations from the House of Commons of Canada as of October 2010, the exact cost for holding both summits was $857,901,850.31, making it less expensive than the security costs for the 2010 Winter Olympics.

It was initially claimed that the summits stand as the most expensive ever held, with security costs for the London and Pittsburgh reported as having been only $30 million and $18 million, respectively. However, the Canadian Parliamentary Budget Officer, Kevin Page, stated in his official report on the costs of the Huntsville and Toronto gatherings that other countries had not been as open about the full price for the similar meetings held there and that the $18 million figure for the Pittsburgh summit was merely for overtime pay for local police and the cost of law enforcement brought from other regions. Ward Elcock, former Canadian Security Intelligence Service director and the chief of the Integrated Security Units for the Winter Olympics and the G8/G20 summits, claimed that the security costs were in fact "comparable" with those of previous summits. Finance minister Jim Flaherty defended the security cost, claiming "it's necessary to spend substantially to have security. It's Canada's turn, and it's necessary that we either don't take our turn or pay the appropriate price to have the security that is necessary so that everyone is safe here in Toronto."

The creation of the $23-million international media centre, which included the $1.9 million Experience Canada pavilion and $57,000 artificial lake, at the Exhibition Place was widely opposed and criticized by politicians as "a waste of taxpayers' money." Criticism mainly targeted Stephen Harper and Canada's Conservative government. Some protesting groups gave names to the artificial lake, such as "Harper's Folly". In a debate in the House of Commons, member Mark Holland said, "Instead of hosting world leaders, maybe the government should consider party planning for Lady Gaga." According to some critics, the spending misled the objective of the summits into showing off Canada's attributes instead of promoting the summits' agendas. New Democratic Party leader Jack Layton condemned the Harper government, saying, "we've got a government here that has to create an artificial lake when Canada has more lakes than just about any other country in the world. It is the taxpayers who are going to end up at the bottom of the fake lake." Transport minister John Baird defended the artificial lake, saying that the summits gave a "chance to showcase the very best that [Canada] has to offer." Foreign affairs minister Lawrence Cannon said it was "normal practice" for a country to showcase its attributes while hosting world events. Harper also defended by saying, "This is a classic attempt for us to be able to market the country." Upon its opening, the artificial lake received mostly negative reviews from Canadian reporters.

=== Economic impact ===
The summit's economic impact was a major concern of a few local politicians and citizens. The City of Toronto government, as well as some public representatives, previously argued that the G20 summit should be held at an isolated venue, such as the Exhibition Place, rather than the Metro Toronto Convention Centre, which is located in the city's central business district. As a result, during the aftermath of the protests during the summit, when several business and properties in Downtown Toronto were damaged, mayor David Miller urged the federal government to compensate for all the damages. It was initially outlined by the government that only damages to businesses within the security zone would be compensated. However, all damages occurred outside of the security zone. Some businesses in the downtown core suffered financially as a result. According to Member of Parliament John McCallum, "Stephen Harper made a huge mistake in holding this summit in downtown Toronto." According to the Toronto Star, at least 40 stores in the Downtown Yonge Business Improvement Area suffered damages and one repair firm performed up to $750,000 in repairs.

=== International response ===
On June 17, the United States Department of State issued a travel alert for Toronto, warning tourists of the expected traffic disruptions and potentially violent protests during the G20 summit. The alert, which was expected to expire on the last day of the summit, stated that "Even demonstrations that are meant to be peaceful can become violent and unpredictable." Toronto Mayor David Miller described the warning as an "over-reaction."

During the summit, a few overseas reporters commented on Canada and the summits. A reporter of the British Broadcasting Corporation (BBC) made positive remarks about Canada's economy, saying "The Canadians, it seems, have answers for even the toughest puzzles and they are keen to share their strategies with the rest of the world. Why in this economy, we all want to be Canadian." A writer in The New York Times made positive comments about the summits' preparations and natural beauty of the Muskoka region. The Times of India and The Hindu commented on impacts on city life in Toronto due to the G20 summit and the "unprecedented" security measures taken in Canada. A Reuters reporter, on the other hand, condemned the international media centre's artificial lake.

Looking forward, French president Nicolas Sarkozy announced that the costs for hosting the proposed 2011 G20 Cannes summit and 37th G8 summit in France would be one-tenth of Canada's.

== See also ==
- 14th G7 summit
- G20 Research Group
