= 14th G7 summit =

1988 international leader meeting in Canada

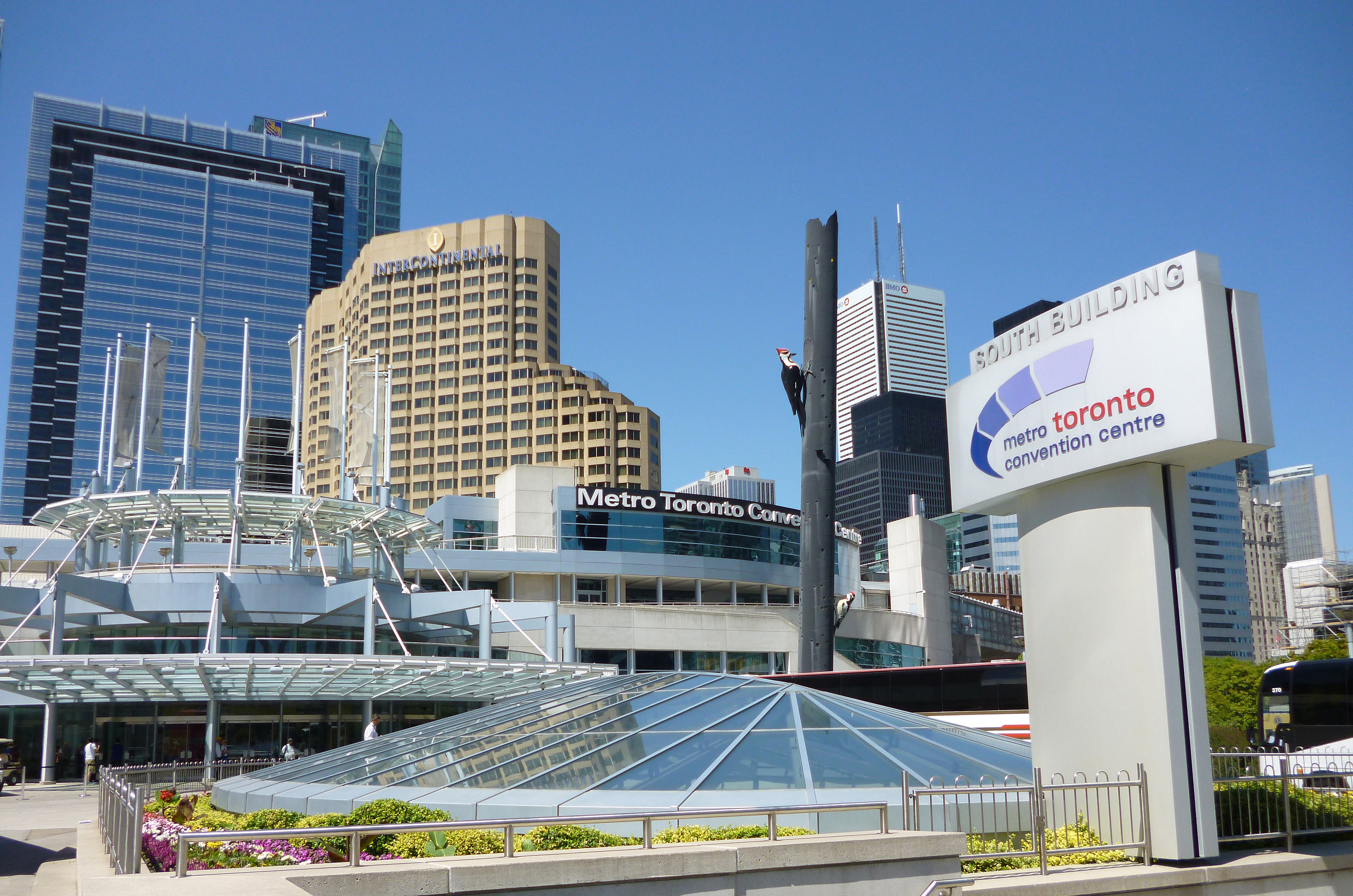
- Metro Toronto Convention Centre, Front Street entrance
- Host country: Canada
- Dates: June 19–20, 1988
- Cities: Toronto, Ontario
- Venues: Metro Toronto Convention Centre
- Follows: 13th G7 summit
- Precedes: 15th G7 summit

The 14th G7 Summit was held in Toronto, Ontario, Canada between June 19 and 21, 1988. The venue for the summit meetings was the Metro Toronto Convention Centre in Downtown Toronto.

The Group of Seven (G7) was an unofficial forum which brought together the heads of the richest industrialized countries: France, West Germany, Italy, Japan, the United Kingdom, the United States, Canada (since 1976), and the President of the European Commission (starting officially in 1981). The summits were not meant to be linked formally with wider international institutions; and in fact, a mild rebellion against the stiff formality of other international meetings was a part of the genesis of cooperation between France's president Valéry Giscard d'Estaing and West Germany's chancellor Helmut Schmidt as they conceived the first Group of Six (G6) summit in 1975.

Unlike the relatively low key summit at Château Montebello in 1981, the Toronto summit was held under tight security with involvement of the Royal Canadian Mounted Police (RCMP) and Metro Toronto Police.

Canada was the first member of the G7 or G8 to host both this kind of Summit and an Olympic Games in the same calendar year. In February, Calgary, Alberta, hosted the 1988 Winter Olympics. Canada would do this again 22 years later when they hosted the 2010 Winter Olympics in Vancouver, British Columbia and then the 36th G8 summit and the 4th G20 summit in Huntsville, Ontario and Toronto respectively.

== Leaders at the summit ==
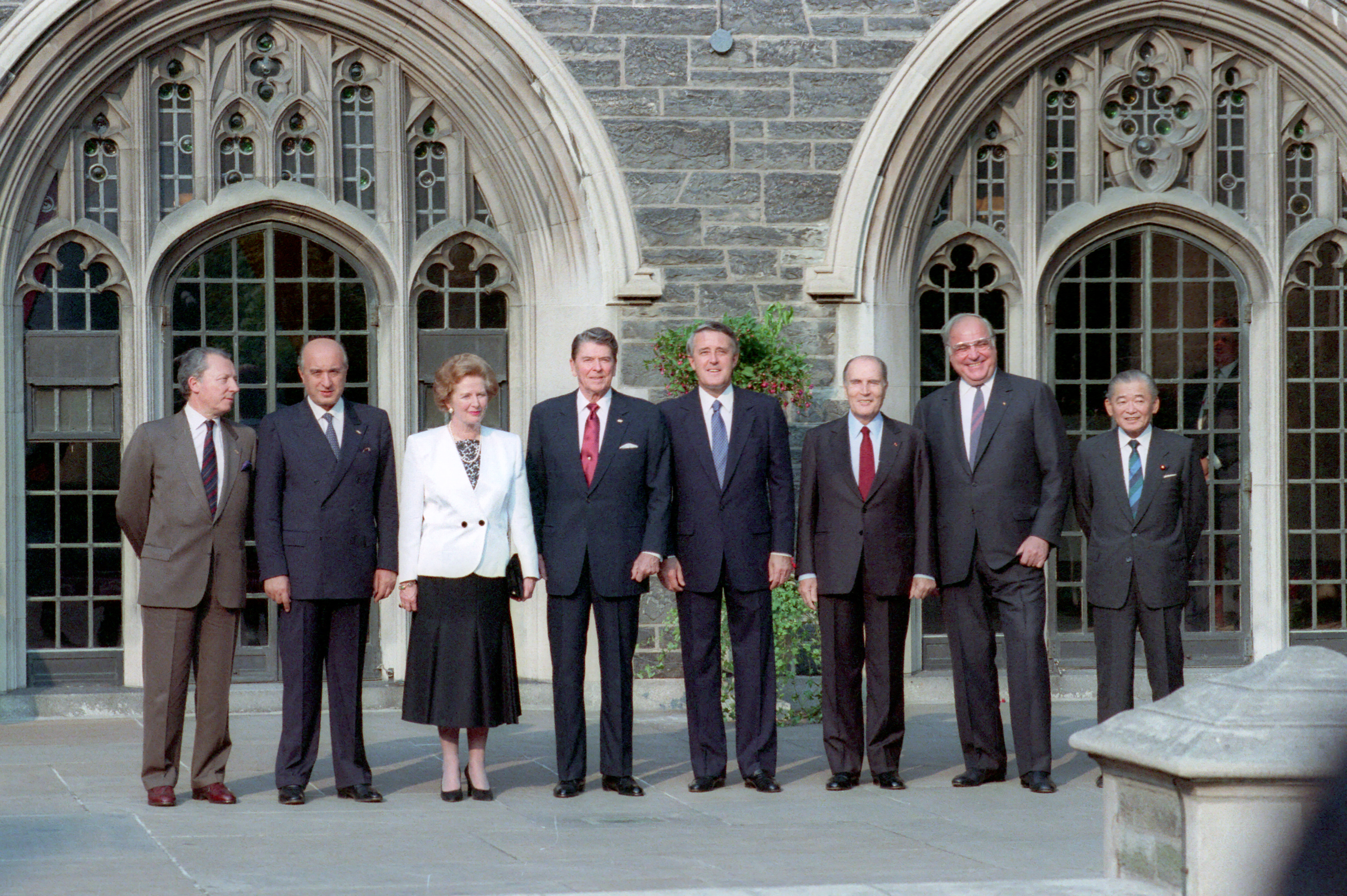
Summit leaders at the University of Toronto: (left to right) Jacques Delors, Ciriaco De Mita, Margaret Thatcher, Ronald Reagan, Brian Mulroney, François Mitterrand, Helmut Kohl, and Noboru Takeshita

The G7 is an unofficial annual forum for the leaders of Canada, the European Commission, France, Germany, Italy, Japan, the United Kingdom and the United States.

The 14th G7 summit was the first summit for Italian Prime Minister Ciriaco De Mita and was the last summit for US President Ronald Reagan. It was also the first and only summit for Japanese Prime Minister Noboru Takeshita.

=== Participants ===
These summit participants are the current "core members" of the international forum:

**Core G7 members** Host state and leader are shown in bold text.
Member		Represented by	Title
(Canada)	**Canada**	**Brian Mulroney**	**Prime Minister**
(France)	France	François Mitterrand	President
(West Germany)	West Germany	Helmut Kohl	Chancellor
(Italy)	Italy	Ciriaco De Mita	Prime Minister
(Japan)	Japan	Noboru Takeshita	Prime Minister
(United Kingdom)	United Kingdom	Margaret Thatcher	Prime Minister
(United States)	United States	Ronald Reagan	President
(European Union)	European Community	Jacques Delors	Commission President
(European Union)	European Community	Helmut Kohl	Council President

== Issues ==
The summit was intended as a venue for resolving differences among its members. As a practical matter, the summit was also conceived as an opportunity for its members to give each other mutual encouragement in the face of difficult economic decisions. Issues which were discussed at this summit included:

- International Economic Policy Cooperation
- Multilateral Trading System / Uruguay Round
- Newly Industrialized Economies
- Developing Countries and Debt
- Environment
- Future Summits
- Other Issues
- Annex on Structural Reform

== Criticism ==
The Toronto-based Canadian Organization for the Rights of Prostitutes issued a number of press releases leading up to the economic summit pointing out that the local vice squads were tasked with cleaning up the city streets through a coordinated crackdown on sex workers. This crackdown and economic summit took place in Toronto amidst the tumultuous restructuring of the Canadian Criminal Code to outlaw commercial sex by criminalizing communication for the purpose of obtaining commercial sexual services in public. Similar crackdowns against other street-involved communities (drug users, the homeless, gays and lesbians, transgender people) continue today in the lead up to large economic summits like the G7, IMF, World Bank as well as sporting events like the World Cup, the Olympics, and Formula One.

== Gallery of participating leaders ==
=== Core G7 participants ===
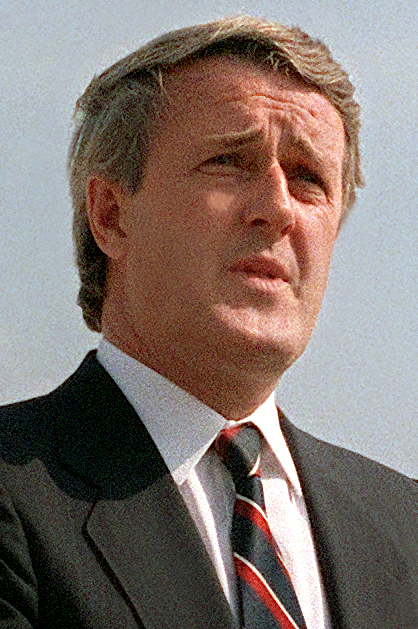
(Canada) Canada
Brian Mulroney,
Prime Minister (Host)

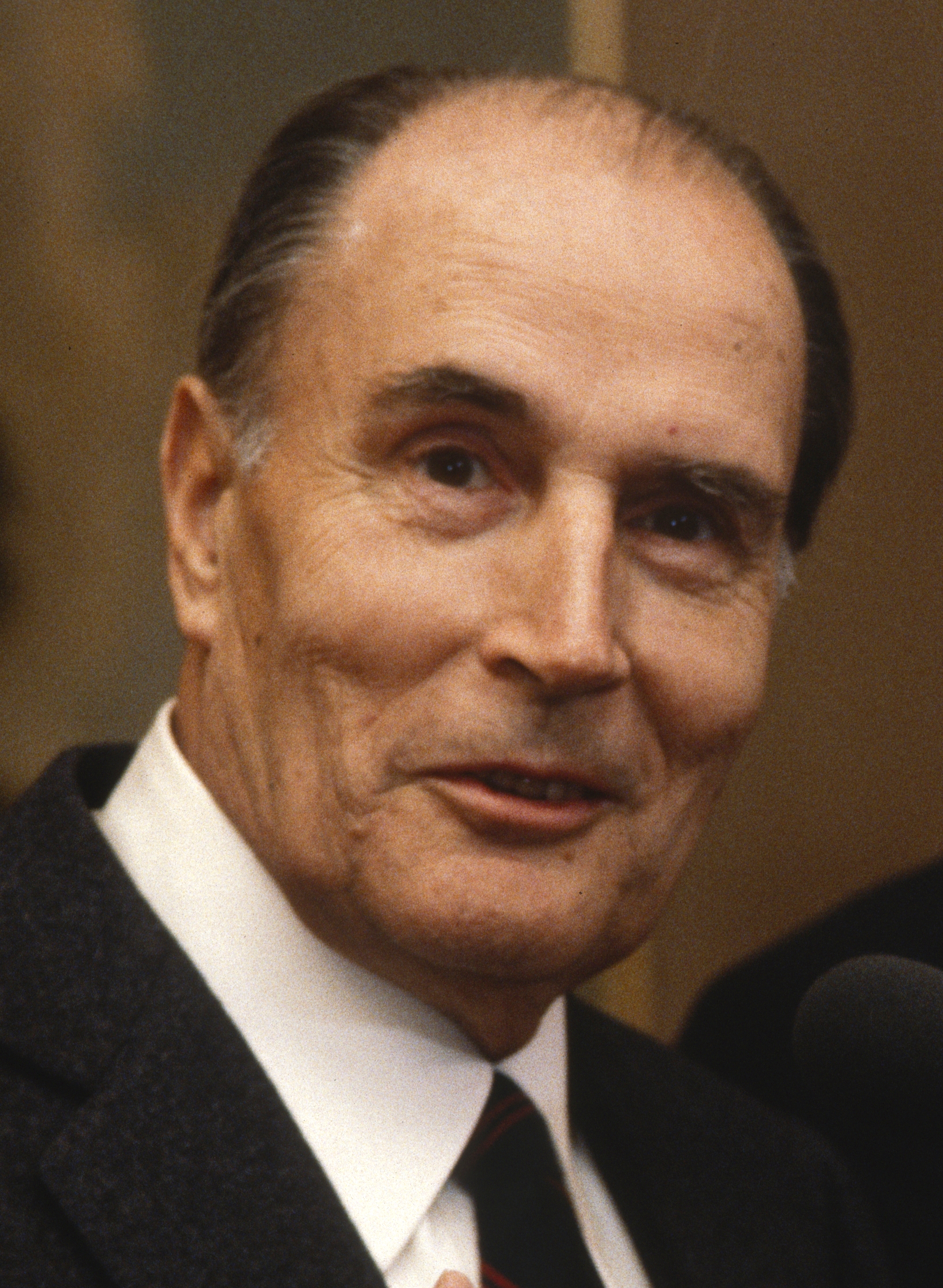
(France) France
François Mitterrand,
President

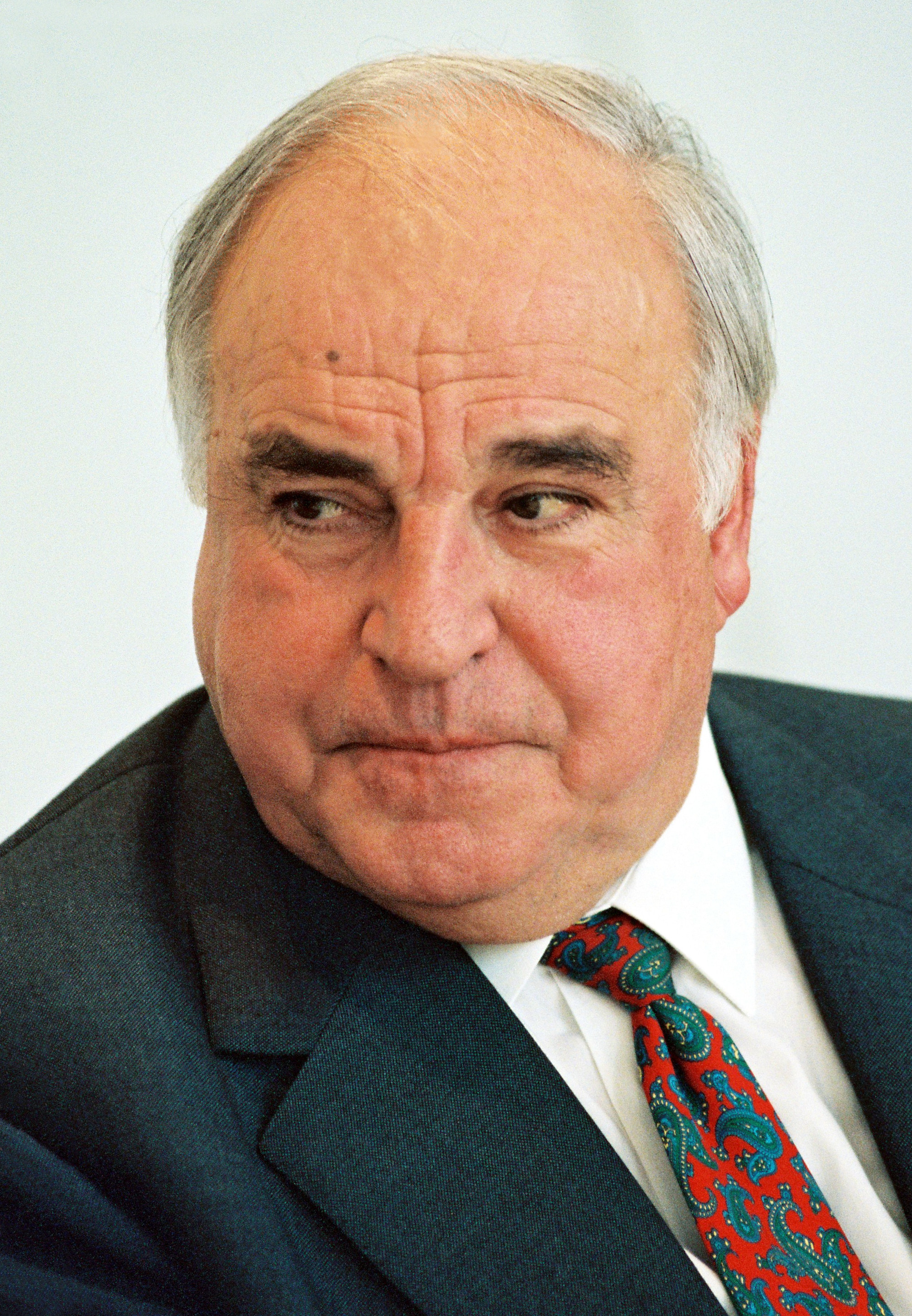
(West Germany) West Germany
Helmut Kohl,
Chancellor

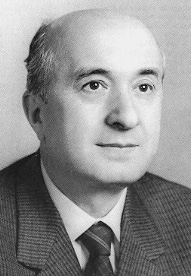
(Italy) Italy
Ciriaco De Mita,
Prime Minister

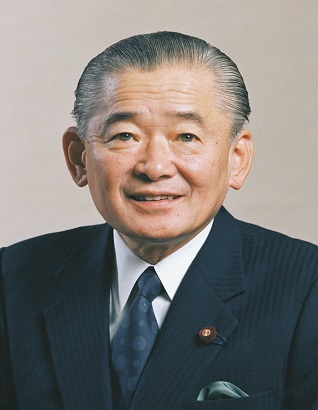
(Japan) Japan
Noboru Takeshita,
Prime Minister

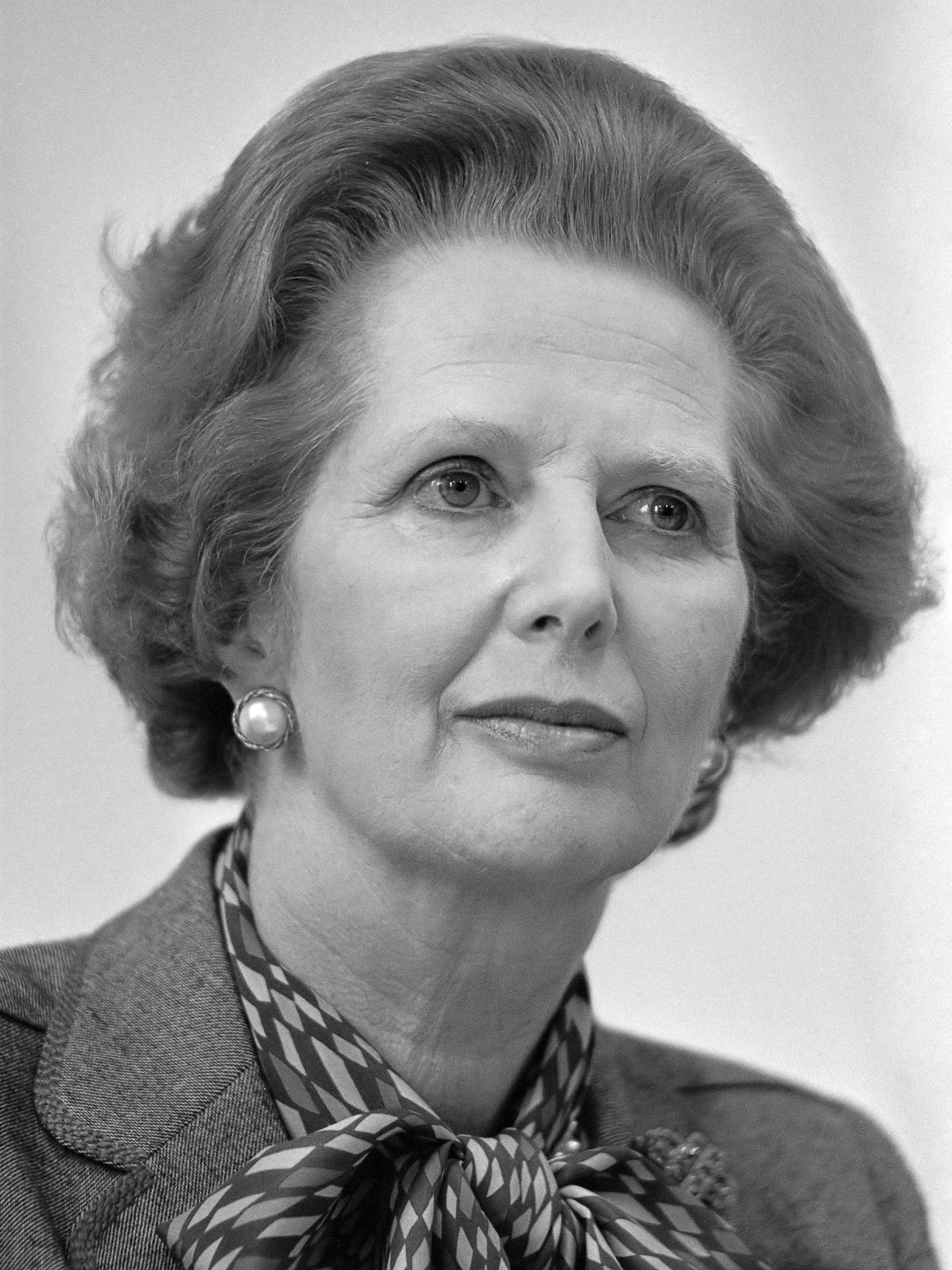
(United Kingdom) United Kingdom
Margaret Thatcher,
Prime Minister

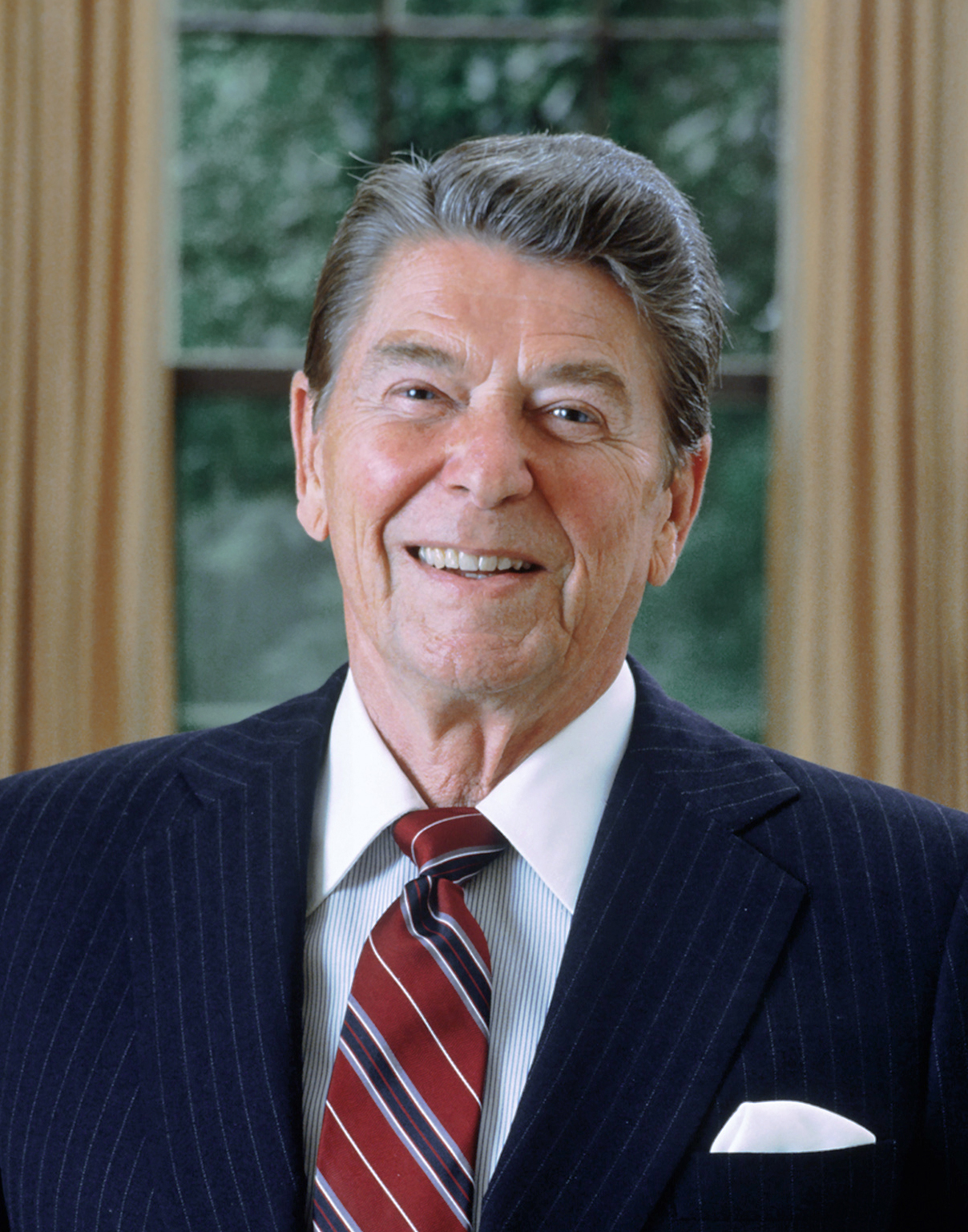
United States Ronald Reagan, President
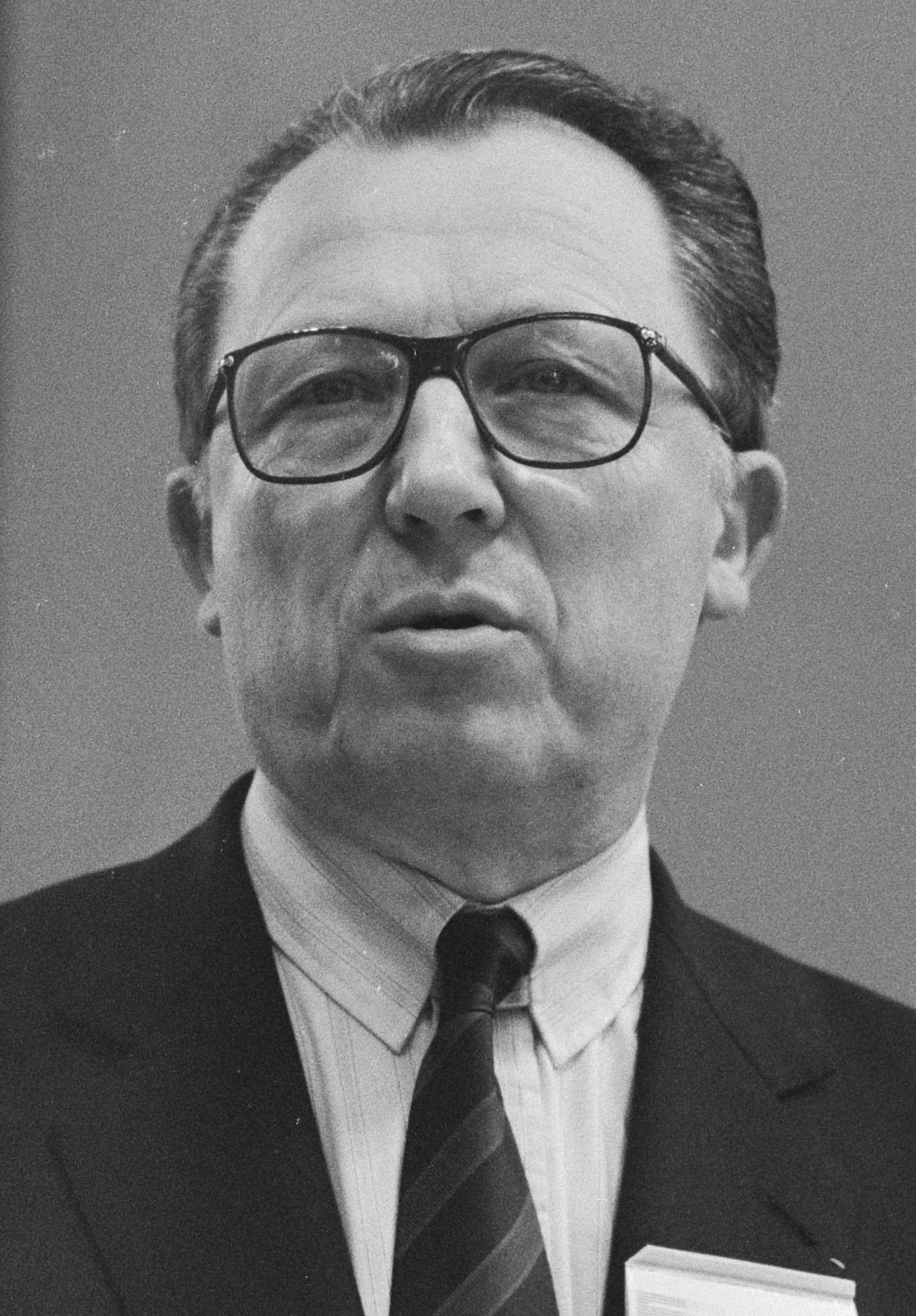
(European Union) European Union
Jacques Delors,
Commission President

== See also ==
- 2010 G20 Toronto summit
- G8
