= Deerhurst Resort =

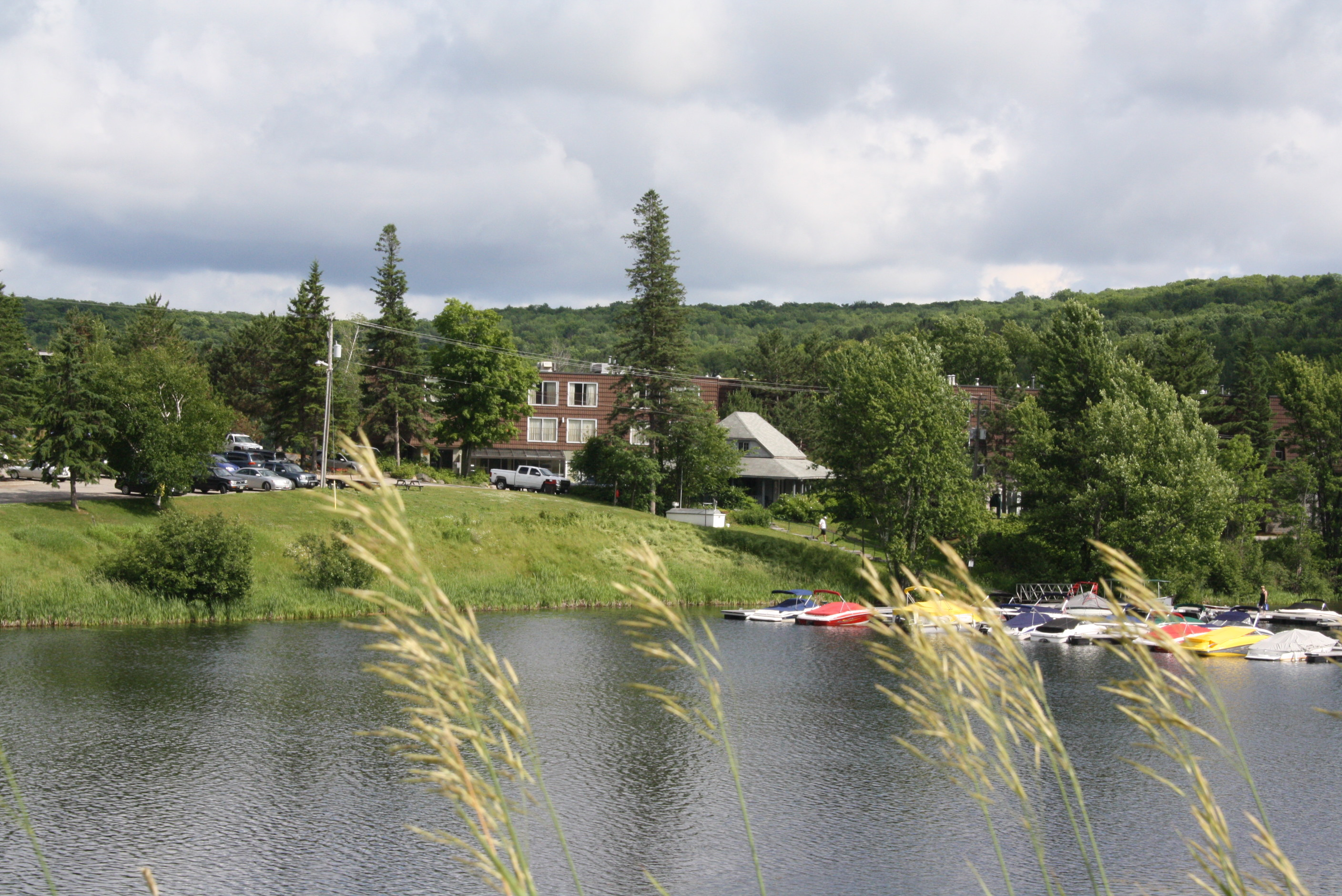
- Deerhurst Resort
- Interactive map of the Deerhurst Resort area
- Hotel chain: Skyline Hotels & Resorts

General information
- Type: Hotel & resort
- Location: 1235 Deerhurst Drive Huntsville, Ontario, Canada
- Coordinates: 45°20′48″N 79°7′55″W
- Opening: 1896

Other information
- Number of rooms: 425
- Number of restaurants: 4
- Number of bars: 1

Website
- "Deerhurst Resort"

Deerhurst Resort in Huntsville, Ontario, is 215 km (133 Miles) north of Toronto in Ontario's Muskoka region, bordering the Algonquin Provincial Park. The resort dates from 1896 when it was opened by English entrepreneur Charles Waterhouse. The lakeside hotel was the central venue of the 36th G8 summit in 2010.

== History ==
Deerhurst was the first major resort on the northern lakes of Muskoka. In the early days, Deerhurst's lodge was accessible only by steamboat and the property encompassed only four acres of waterfront. In 1896, Deerhurst hosted two guests who paid $3.50 per person per week, three meals a day included. By the 1990s, Deerhurst had expanded to nearly 800 acres (3.2 km^{2}) and could accommodate 1,000 guests.

Deerhurst is now run by Skyline International Developments and is under the flag of Skyline Hotels & Resorts. The Waterhouse financial interests in Deerhurst were sold in 1989.

== 36th G8 summit ==
The 36th G8 summit at Deerhurst held from June 25–26, 2010 was the fifth G8 Summit hosted by Canada since 1976.

== Golf ==
Deerhurst features two 18 hole golf courses, the Highlands and the Lakeside. Deerhurst Highlands is the larger of the two and was ranked as Score Golf's Best Resort Course in Ontario 2011 as well as #11 out of all public golf courses in Ontario in Score Golf's ranking. Lakeside is a smaller, 64 par course.

== See also ==
- Huntsville/Deerhurst Resort Airport - LID: CDH1
- Huntsville Water Aerodrome
- Huntsville/Bella Lake Water Aerodrome
- List of G8 summit resorts
