= List of international trips made by Liz Truss as Foreign Secretary =

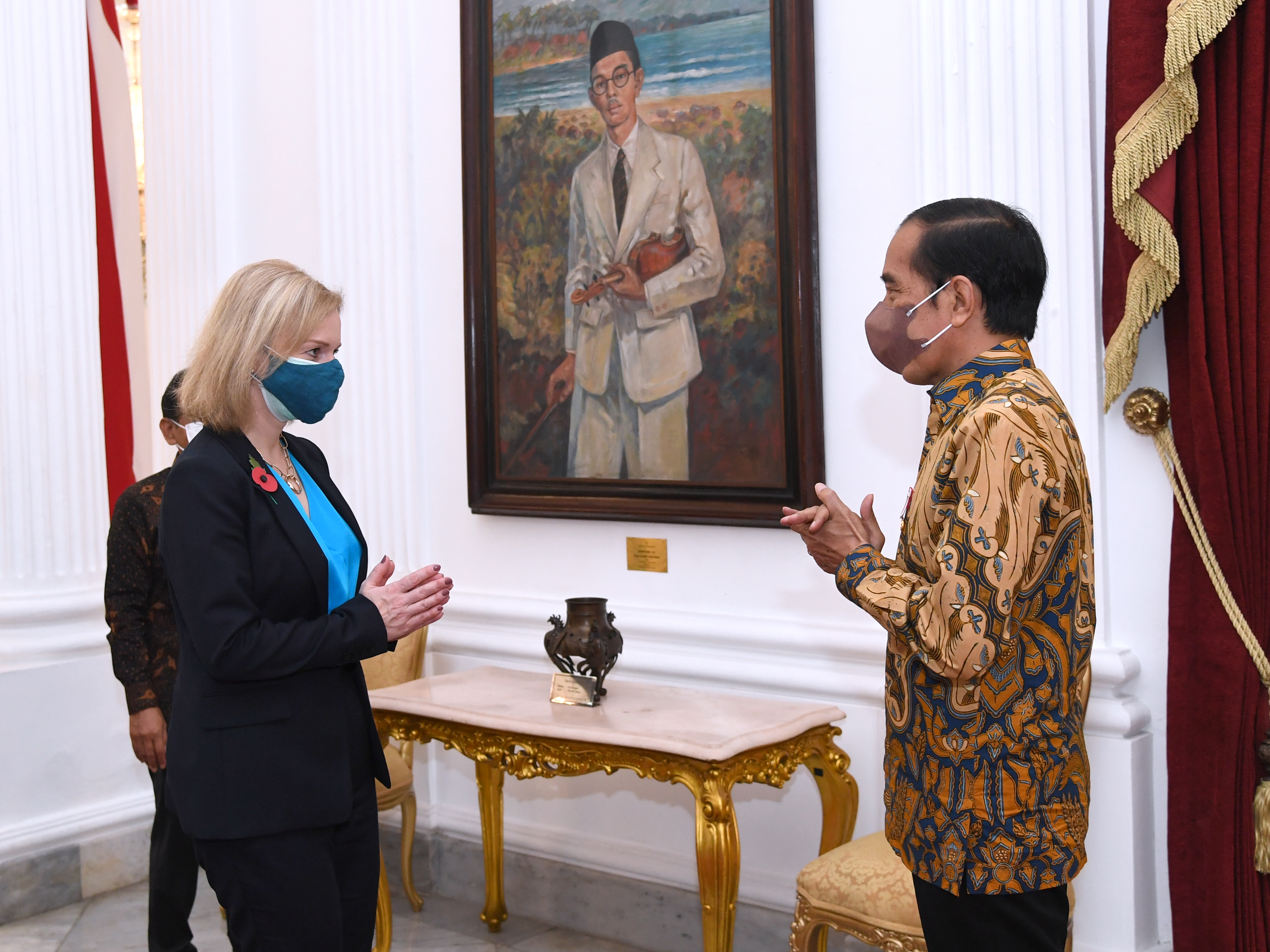
Truss with Indonesian President Joko Widodo in Jakarta, Indonesia, 11 November 2021.

This is a list of international visits undertaken by Liz Truss (in office from September 2021 to September 2022) while serving as the Foreign Secretary, first for Boris Johnson. The list includes both private travel and official visits. The list includes only foreign travel which the Foreign Secretary made during his tenure in the position. She was unable to travel as extensively as many of her predecessors and successors while in the role due to the ongoing COVID-19 pandemic, which severely restricted travel globally during the period. Truss was the last British Foreign Secretary to visit Russia prior to the Russian invasion of Ukraine.

== Summary ==
Truss visited at least 19 countries and territories during her tenure as Foreign Secretary. The number of visits per country or territory where Truss traveled are:

- One visit to Australia, Estonia, Germany, Indonesia, Latvia, Lithuania, Malaysia, Mexico, Oman, Qatar, Russia, Saudi Arabia, Sweden, Switzerland, Thailand and Ukraine.
- Two visits to India and the United States
- Three visits to Belgium.

== Table ==
| | Country | Locations | Dates | Details |
|---|---|---|---|---|
| 1 | United States | New York | 20-23 September 2021 | Attended the UN General Assembly and met with counterparts, including Iranian Foreign Minister Hossein Amir-Abdollahian. |
| 2 | Mexico | Mexico City | 23-24 September 2021 | Traveled to Mexico City to open a new UK Embassy and visit an AstraZeneca vaccine bottling site. Also met with her Mexican counterpart Foreign Minister Marcelo Ebrard. |
| 3 | Saudi Arabia | Riyadh | 20-21 October 2021 | Met with Minister of Foreign Affairs, Prince Faisal bin Farhan Al-Saud to discuss closer cooperation on regional security, development, human rights and counter-terrorism. |
| 3 | Qatar | Doha | 21-22 October 2021 | Met with Amir Sheikh Tamim bin Hamad Al Thani and Deputy Prime Minister and Foreign Minister, Mohammed bin Abdulrahman bin Jassim Al Thani, to discuss Afghanistan and regional security more broadly. |
| 3 | India | New Delhi, Mumbai | 22-24 October 2021 | Met with Indian External Affairs Minister Subrahmanyam Jaishankar and Environment Minister Bhupender Yadav in Delhi to discuss areas for closer collaboration, before heading to Mumbai, to visit the United Kingdom Carrier Strike Group 21. Announced a series of tech and infrastructure tie-ups with India. |
| 4 | Malaysia | Kuala Lumpur | 6-7 November 2021 | Met with Prime Minister Ismail Sabri to discuss defence cooperation, as well as trade. She will also meet her Malaysian counterpart, Saifuddin Abdullah, to forge stronger ties on maritime security and champion free trade. |
| 4 | Thailand | Bangkok | 8-10 November 2021 | Met with Prime Minister Prayut Chan-o-cha and Foreign Minister Don Pramudwinai. Also formally opened the new British Embassy in Bangkok and visit the Triumph Motorcycle factory. |
| 4 | Indonesia | Jakarta | 10-12 November 2021 | Met with President Joko Widodo and Foreign Minister Retno Marsudi for talks on economic diplomacy, trade and technology dialogue, as well as foreign policy issues.. |
| 5 | Estonia | Tallinn | 29-30 November 2021 | Visited UK forces in Estonia and met with the government over blocking the Nord Stream 2 pipeline. Was pictured riding in a tank which was mocked in some quarters, with comparison made to similar images of Margaret Thatcher. |
| 5 | Latvia | Riga | 30 November-1 December 2021 | Attended a NATO Foreign Ministers meeting. |
| 5 | Sweden | Stockholm | 1-3 December 2021 | Attended the OSCE Ministerial Council and met with Russian Foreign Minister Sergei Lavrov, where they discussed Ukraine, Belarus and Afghanistan. |
| 6 | Australia | Sydney | 18-21 January 2022 | Attended first UK-Australia AUKMIN meeting since the pandemic, alongside UK Defence Minister Ben Wallace, she met with Australian Minister for Foreign Affairs Marise Payne and Minister for Defence Peter Dutton. |
| 7 | Belgium | Brussels | 24 January 2022 | Attended NATO Foreign Ministers meeting. |
| 8 | Russia | Moscow | 9-10 February 2022 | Met with her Russian counterpart Sergei Lavrov to address the build up of Russian troops at the border of Ukraine and urge Russia not to invade Ukraine. She was ultimately unsuccessful and two weeks later the Russian invasion of Ukraine began. |
| 9 | Ukraine | Kyiv | 18-21 February 2022 | Visited Ukraine in solidarity in the face of threats from Russia and spoke at the Ukrainian ministry of foreign affairs on the Russian threat. |
| 10 | Germany | Munich | 18-19 February 2022 | Visited Ukraine in solidarity in the face of threats from Russia and spoke at the Ukrainian ministry of foreign affairs on the Russian threat. |
| 11 | Belgium | Brussels | 21 February 2022 | Represented the UK at Withdrawal Agreement Joint Committee meeting and met with NATO Secretary-General Jens Stoltenberg. |
| 12 | Switzerland | Geneva | 1 March 2022 | Attended a United Nations Human Rights Council meeting. |
| 13 | Lithuania | Vilnius | 2 March 2022 | Met with the Baltic Defence Ministers, Estonian Foreign Minister Eva-Maria Liimets, Latvian Foreign Minister Edgars Rinkēvičs and Lithuanian Foreign Minister Gabrielius Landsbergis, to discuss the Russian invasion of Ukraine and joint NATO response options. |
| 13 | Belgium | Brussels | 4 March 2022 | Met with other European Foreign Ministers to discuss support to Ukraine. |
| 14 | United States | Washington, D.C. | 9-11 March 2022 | Met with US Secretary of State Antony Blinken and National Security Advisor Jake Sullivan to discuss support to Ukraine. |
| 15 | Oman | Muscat | 30-31 March 2022 | Met with Sultan Haitham bin Tarik. |
| 15 | India | New Delhi | 31 March-1 April 2022 | Met with India's External Affairs Minister Subrahmanyam Jaishankar to discuss defence and security ties and the ongoing Russian invasion of Ukraine. |

== See also ==
- List of international prime ministerial trips made by Boris Johnson
- List of international prime ministerial trips made by Liz Truss
- List of international trips made by foreign secretaries of the United Kingdom
