= List of international prime ministerial trips made by Boris Johnson =

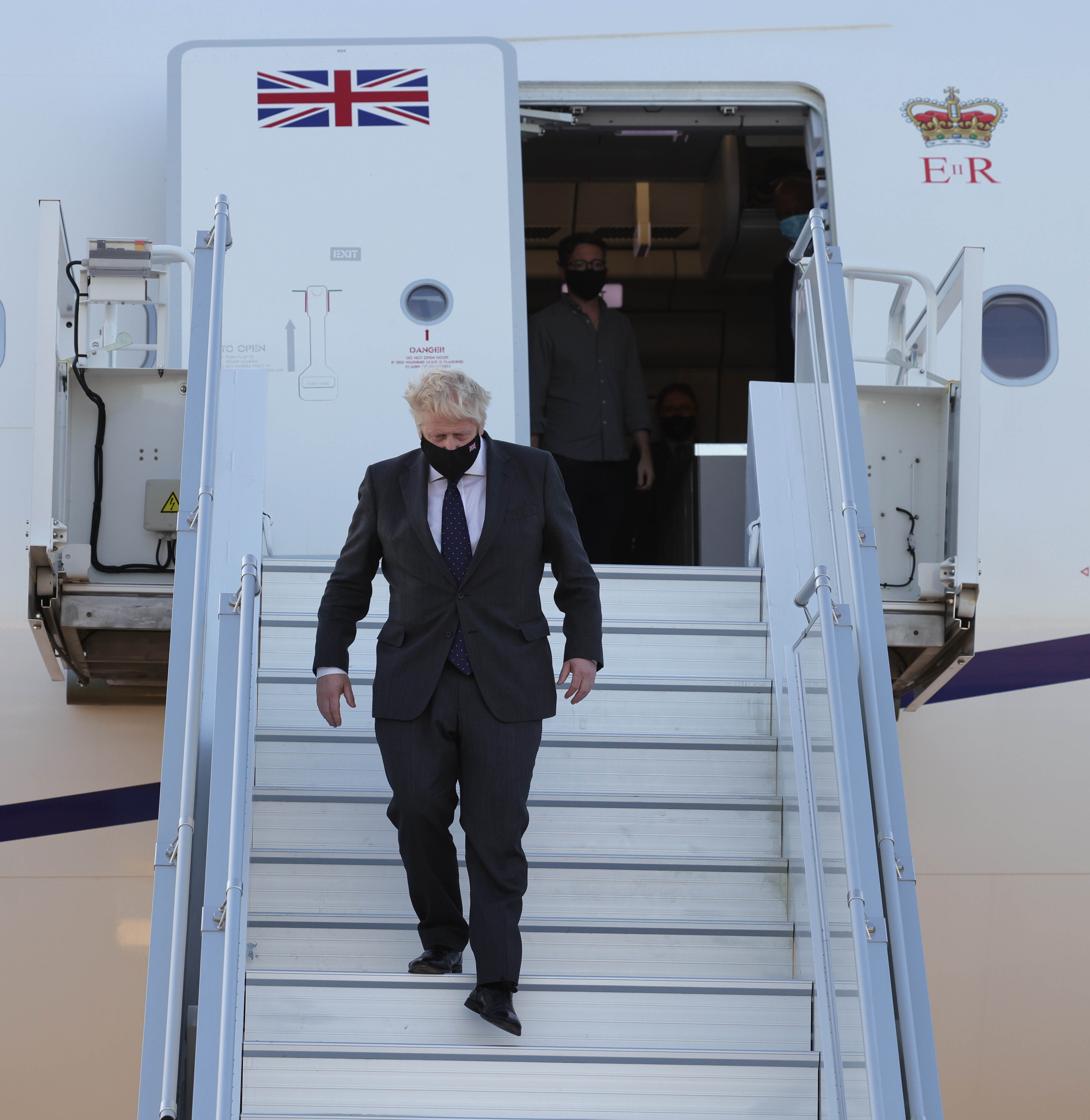
Prime Minister Boris Johnson arrives in New York City, September 2021.

This is the list of international prime ministerial trips made by Boris Johnson, who served as Prime Minister of the United Kingdom from 24 July 2019 until his resignation on 6 September 2022. Boris Johnson made 26 trips to 18 countries during his premiership.

== Summary ==
The number of visits per country where Johnson travelled are:

- One: Finland, India, Ireland, Italy, Luxembourg, Oman, Rwanda, Saudi Arabia, Spain, and Sweden.
- Two: Estonia, France, Poland, the United Arab Emirates, and the United States.
- Four: Germany and Ukraine
- Five: Belgium

World map highlighting the 18 countries visited by Boris Johnson during his premiership: United Kingdom One visit Two visits Four visits Five visits

== 2019 ==
#	Country	Location	Date	Details	Image
1	Germany	Berlin	21–22 August	Johnson met with Chancellor Angela Merkel.	
1	France	Paris	22–23 August	Johnson met with President Emmanuel Macron.	
2	France	Biarritz	24–26 August	Johnson attended the G7 summit.	
3	Ireland	Dublin	9 September	Johnson met with Taoiseach Leo Varadkar.	
4	Luxembourg	Luxembourg City	16 September	Johnson met with Prime Minister Xavier Bettel and President of the European Commission Jean-Claude Juncker.	
5	United States	New York City	23–25 September	Johnson attended the 74th United Nations General Assembly.	
6	Belgium	Brussels	17–18 October	Johnson attended the European Council Summit.	
7	Estonia	Tallinn	21 December	Johnson met with Prime Minister Jüri Ratas. Johnson also visited British troops stationed in Tapa Army Base.	

== 2020 ==
#	Country	Location	Date	Details	Image
8	Oman	Muscat	12–13 January	Johnson paid his condolences to the late Sultan Qaboos bin Said al Said and met his successor Sultan Haitham bin Tariq Al Said and senior Omani Government Officials.	
9	Germany	Berlin	19 January	Johnson attended a meeting on ending the Libyan Civil War. Johnson also met French President Emmanuel Macron and Russian President Vladimir Putin.	
10	Belgium	Brussels	9 December	Johnson met with the President of the European Commission Ursula von der Leyen about reaching a Brexit deal.	

== 2021 ==
#	Country	Location	Date	Details	Image
11	Belgium	Brussels	14 June	Johnson attended the 31st NATO summit.	
12	United States	New York City, Washington, D.C.	20–23 September	Johnson attended the 76th United Nations General Assembly and met with President Joe Biden and Vice President Kamala Harris at the White House.	
13	Italy	Rome	29–31 October	Johnson attended the G20 summit.	

== 2022 ==
#	Country	Location	Date	Details	Image
14	Ukraine	Kyiv	1 February	Johnson met with President Volodymyr Zelenskyy.	
15	Belgium	Brussels	10 February	Johnson met with NATO Secretary General Jens Stoltenberg.	
15	Poland	Warsaw	10 February	Johnson met with Prime Minister Mateusz Morawiecki and President Andrzej Duda. Johnson also visited British troops stationed in Wesoła.	
16	Germany	Munich	19 February	Johnson attended the Munich Security Conference. Johnson also met with Chancellor Olaf Scholz, Estonian Prime Minister Kaja Kallas, Latvian President Egils Levits and Ukrainian President Volodymyr Zelenskyy.	
17	Poland	Warsaw	1 March	Johnson met with Prime Minister Mateusz Morawiecki to discuss the ongoing security in Eastern Europe.	
17	Estonia	Tallinn	1 March	Johnson met with Prime Minister Kaja Kallas and NATO Secretary General Jens Stoltenberg. Johnson also visited British troops at Tapa Army Base.	
18	United Arab Emirates	Abu Dhabi	16 March	Johnson met with Crown Prince Mohammed bin Zayed.	
18	Saudi Arabia	Riyadh	16 March	Johnson met with Crown Prince Mohammed bin Salman.	
19	Belgium	Brussels	24 March	Johnson attended an extraordinary NATO summit.	
20	Ukraine	Kyiv	9 April	Johnson met with President Volodymyr Zelenskyy and to set out a new package of financial and military aid during the ongoing Russian invasion of Ukraine.	
21	India	Gujarat, New Delhi	21–22 April	Johnson visited Sabarmati Ashram in Ahmedabad and later received by Union Minister Rajeev Chandrasekhar following his arrival in Delhi. While in Delhi, Johnson laid a wreath at Mahatma Gandhi's Raj Ghat Memorial. He later met with Prime Minister Narendra Modi in New Delhi During talks between Johnson and Modi which were held at Hyderabad House, Johnson pledged to deepen the UK's trade and defence relations with India. Before Johnson departed from India, he and Modi condemned civilian casualties in the Russia-Ukraine War and called for an immediate ceasefire. However, Johnson also expressed support for India's stance towards the conflict, with Foreign secretary Harsh Vardhan Shringla also stating that Johnson did not pressure a change in the countries more neutral policy.	
22	Sweden	Harpsund	11 May	Johnson met with Prime Minister Magdalena Andersson and signed a co-operation deal.	
22	Finland	Helsinki	11 May	Johnson met with President Sauli Niinistö and signed a co-operation deal.	
23	United Arab Emirates	Abu Dhabi	15 May	Johnson paid his condolences following the death of the President of the UAE and ruler of Abu Dhabi, His Highness Sheikh Khalifa bin Zayed Al Nahyan.	
24	Ukraine	Kyiv	17 June	Johnson met with President Volodymyr Zelenskyy and to announce a training programme for Ukrainian forces.	
25	Rwanda	Kigali	23–25 June	Johnson attended the 2022 Commonwealth Heads of Government Meeting and met with President Paul Kagame.	
25	Germany	Schloss Elmau	26–28 June	Johnson attended the G7 summit.	
25	Spain	Madrid	28–30 June	Johnson attended the NATO summit. Johnson resigned as Prime Minister a week after the trip.	
26	Ukraine	Kyiv	24 August	Johnson met with President Volodymyr Zelenskyy on his final international trip as prime minister.	

== Multilateral meetings ==
Boris Johnson participated in the following summits during his premiership:

Group	Year			
Group	2019	2020	2021	2022
UNGA	23–25 September, (United States) New York City	26 September, (videoconference) (United States) New York City	20–23 September, (United States) New York City	
G7	24–26 August, Biarritz	10–12 June, (cancelled) (United States) Camp David	11–13 June, (United Kingdom) Carbis Bay	26–28 June, (Germany) Schloss Elmau
G20		21–22 November, (videoconference) (Saudi Arabia) Riyadh	30–31 October, (Italy) Rome	
NATO	3–4 December, (United Kingdom) Watford	none	14 June, (Belgium) Brussels	24 March, (Belgium) Brussels
NATO	3–4 December, (United Kingdom) Watford	none	14 June, (Belgium) Brussels	28–30 June, (Spain) Madrid
EU Summit	17–18 October, (Belgium) Brussels	none	none	none
CHOGM	none	none	none	23–25 June, (Rwanda) Kigali
COP	2 December, (Spain) Madrid	none	1–2 November, (United Kingdom) Glasgow	
JEF	none	none	none	14–15 March, (United Kingdom) London
██ = Did not attend.

== See also ==
- Foreign relations of the United Kingdom
- List of international trips made by Liz Truss as Foreign Secretary
- List of international trips made by prime ministers of the United Kingdom
- List of state visits made by Elizabeth II
- List of Commonwealth visits made by Elizabeth II
