= Kaimar (given name) =

- Gender: Male
- Language: Estonian

Origin
- Region of origin: Estonia

Kaimar is an Estonian-language masculine given name. Notable people with the name include:

- Kaimar Karu (born 1980), Estonian politician
- Kaimar Saag (born 1988), Estonian footballer

== See also ==
- Kaimar-ud-Din bin Maidin (1942–2009), Malaysian long jumper
