= Kristjan Järvan =

Estonian politician (born 1990)

Deputy mayor of Tallinn
- Incumbent
- Assumed office 14 April 2024
- Mayor: Jevgeni Ossinovski

Minister of Entrepreneurship and Information Technology
- In office 18 July 2022 – 17 April 2023
- Prime Minister: Kaja Kallas
- Preceded by: Andres Sutt
- Succeeded by: Office disestablished

Personal details
- Born: 10 October 1990 (age 35) Tallinn, Estonia
- Education: University of Tartu

Kristjan Järvan (born 10 October 1990) is an Estonian politician. Deputy mayor of Tallinn in charge of transportation since 14 April 2024. He served as Minister of Entrepreneurship and Information Technology in the second cabinet of Prime Minister Kaja Kallas.

Political offices
Preceded by Andres Sutt	Minister of Entrepreneurship and Information Technology; 2022–present	Incumbent
