= Raul Siem =

Estonian politician (born 1973)

Minister of Foreign Trade and Information Technology
- In office 20 April 2020 – 26 January 2021
- Prime Minister: Jüri Ratas
- Preceded by: Kaimar Karu
- Succeeded by: Andres Sutt

Personal details
- Born: 5 June 1973 (age 53)
- Party: Conservative People's Party of Estonia
- Education: University of Tartu

Raul Siem (born 5 June 1973) is an Estonian politician. He served as Minister of Foreign Trade and Information Technology in the second cabinet of Jüri Ratas from 20 April 2020 to 26 January 2021. He is affiliated with the Conservative People's Party of Estonia.

Political offices
Preceded by Kaimar Karu	Minister of Entrepreneurship and Information Technology; 2020–2021	Succeeded by Andres Sutt
