= Andres Sutt =

Estonian politician

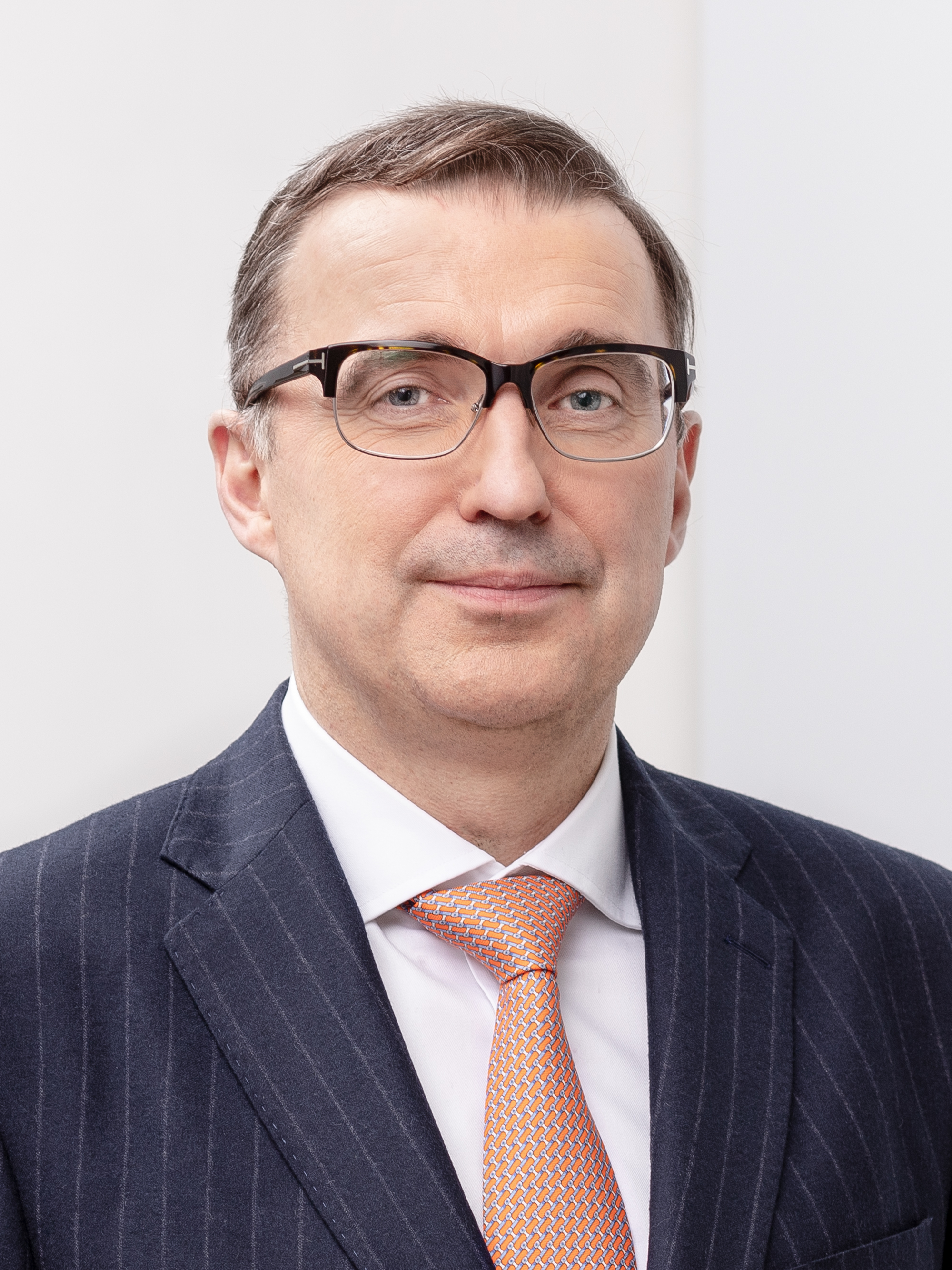
- Andres Sutt in 2021

Minister of Energy and the Environment
- In office
- In office 25 March 2025 – 16 September 2026
- Prime Minister: Kristen Michal
- Preceded by: Yoko Alender (Minister of Climate)
- Succeeded by: Erkki Keldo

Minister of Entrepreneurship and Information Technology
- In office 26 January 2021 – 18 July 2022
- Prime Minister: Kaja Kallas
- Preceded by: Raul Siem
- Succeeded by: Kristjan Järvan

Personal details
- Born: 11 November 1967 (age 59) Tartu, then part of Estonian SSR, Soviet Union
- Party: Reform Party
- Education: University of Tartu

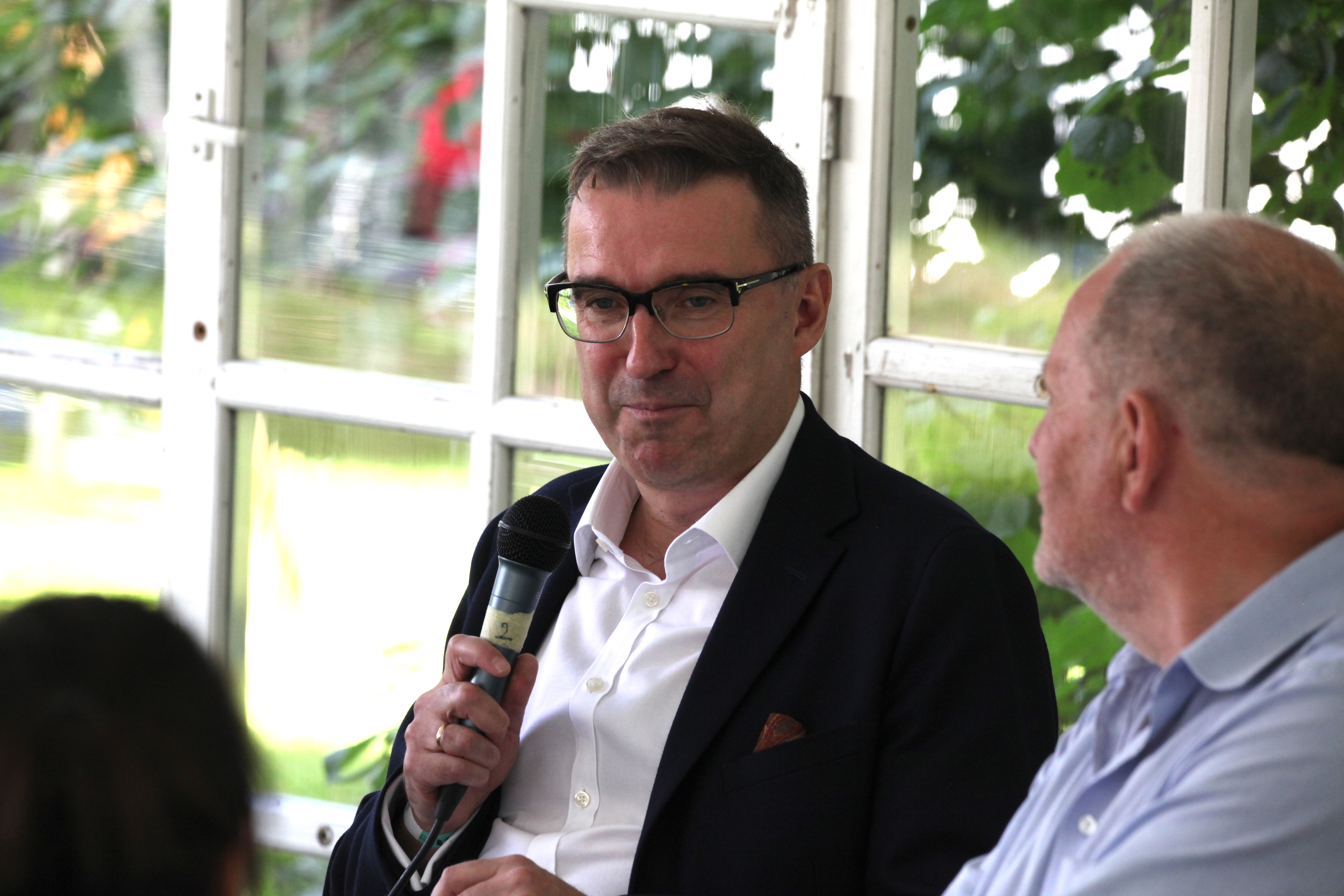
Andres Sutt at the Opinion Festival 2021 in Paide, Estonia

Andres Sutt (born 11 November 1967) is an Estonian politician. He served as Minister of Energy and the Environment in the cabinet of Prime Minister Kristen Michal, and previously as Minister of Entrepreneurship and Information Technology in the cabinet of Prime Minister Kaja Kallas. He served as acting Minister of Foreign Affairs from June to July 2022.

== Early life and education ==
Sutt graduated cum laude from the University of Tartu in 1993 with a degree in economics and finance. In 2008, he graduated from the Advanced Management Program from INSEAD, and in 2015 with a degree in Negotiations and Leadership from Harvard Law School.

== Career ==
From 1992 to 1993, Sutt was the Chief Specialist of Eesti Pank's Central Bank Policy Department. From 1993 to 1996, the Deputy Head of the Banking Supervision Department, and from 1997 to 1999 Deputy Head of the Central Bank Policy Department. From 1999 until 2001, he was the Adviser to the Executive Director of the International Monetary Fund’s (IMF) Nordic-Baltic Constituency and Member of the Board of Directors from 2009 until 2012.

Sutt was Senior Adviser to the Executive Director of the European Financial Stability Facility (EFSF) from 2012 to 2013 and Head of the Banking Division of the European Stability Mechanism (ESM) from 2013 to 2016. From 2017 to 2018, he worked as the Director of Regulatory Relations of Eesti Energia and as a member of the Management Board of the company.

In his capacity as interim foreign minister, Sutt summoned the Russian ambassador to Estonia in June 2022 to condemn President Vladimir Putin's "completely unacceptable" praise for Peter the Great who captured Narva, a city that is now Estonian.

He ran for the Riigikogu in the 2023 elections, received 3315 votes in constituency No 2 (Tallinn's Central City, Lasnamäe and Pirita districts) and was elected with a district mandate.

== Recognition ==
In 2008, Sutt was awarded the Order of the White Star, Class III.

Political offices
Preceded by Raul Siem	Minister of Entrepreneurship and Information Technology; 2021–2022	Succeeded by Kristjan Järvan
Preceded by Eva-Maria Liimets	Acting Minister of Foreign Affairs; 2022	Succeeded by Urmas Reinsalu
Preceded by Yoko Alender	Minister of Energy and the Environment; 2025–	Succeeded by
