= 2021 G20 Rome summit =

Summit of the leaders of all G20 member nations in Rome, Italy

2021 G20 Rome summit 16th G20 Summit
- 30–31 October 2021

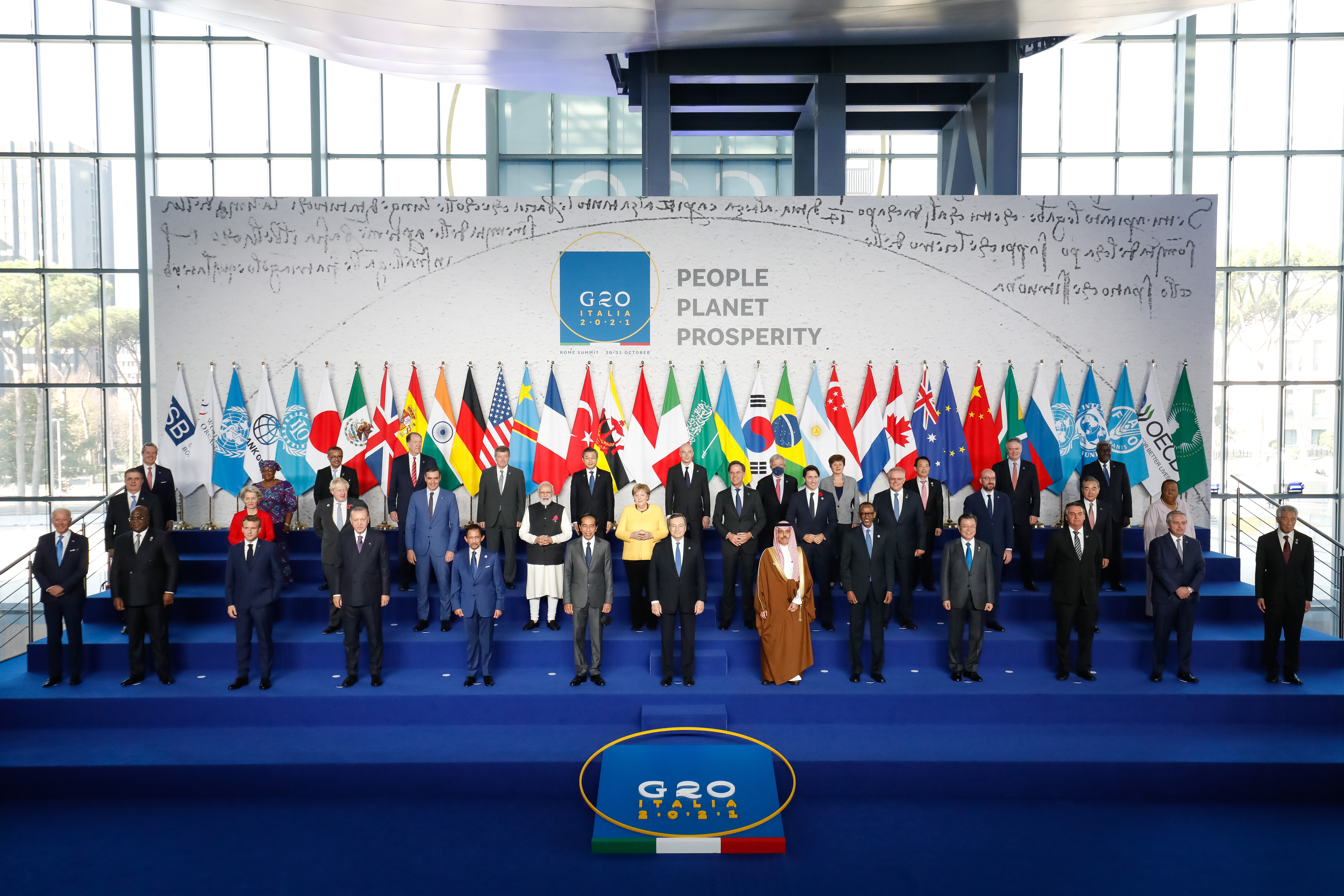
- 2021 G20 summit attendees
- Host country: Italy
- Motto: People, Planet, and Prosperity
- Cities: Rome
- Venues: EUR Convention Center
- Participants: G20 members Invited States: Brunei, D.R. Congo, Netherlands, Rwanda, Singapore, Spain; Invited bodies: United Nations; WTO; AU; International Labour Organization; Organisation for Economic Co-operation and Development; Financial Stability Board; World Health Organization; World Bank
- Chair: Mario Draghi

The 2021 G20 Rome summit was the sixteenth meeting of the Group of Twenty (G20), a Head of State and Government meeting held in Rome, the capital city of Italy. It was the first G20 summit hosted by the country.

== Participating leaders ==
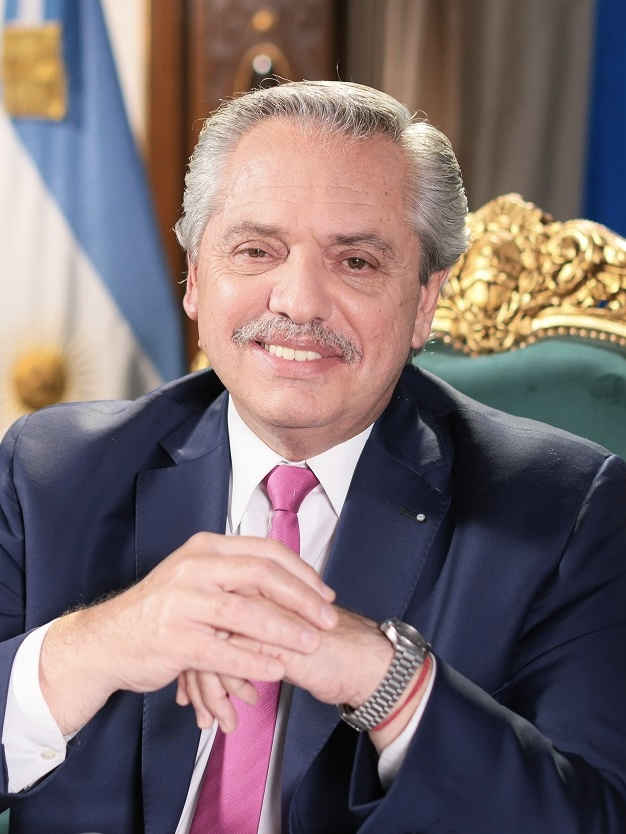
Argentina
Alberto Fernández, President

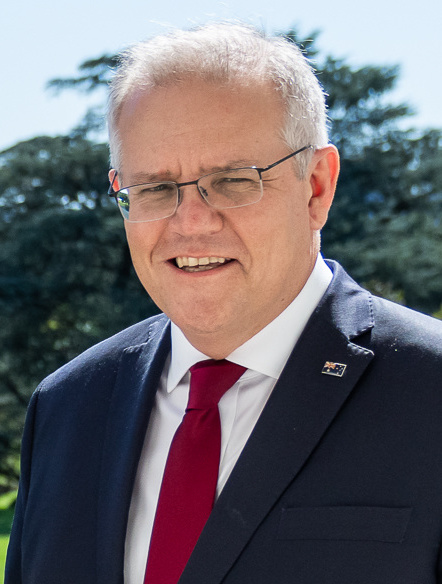
Australia
Scott Morrison, Prime Minister

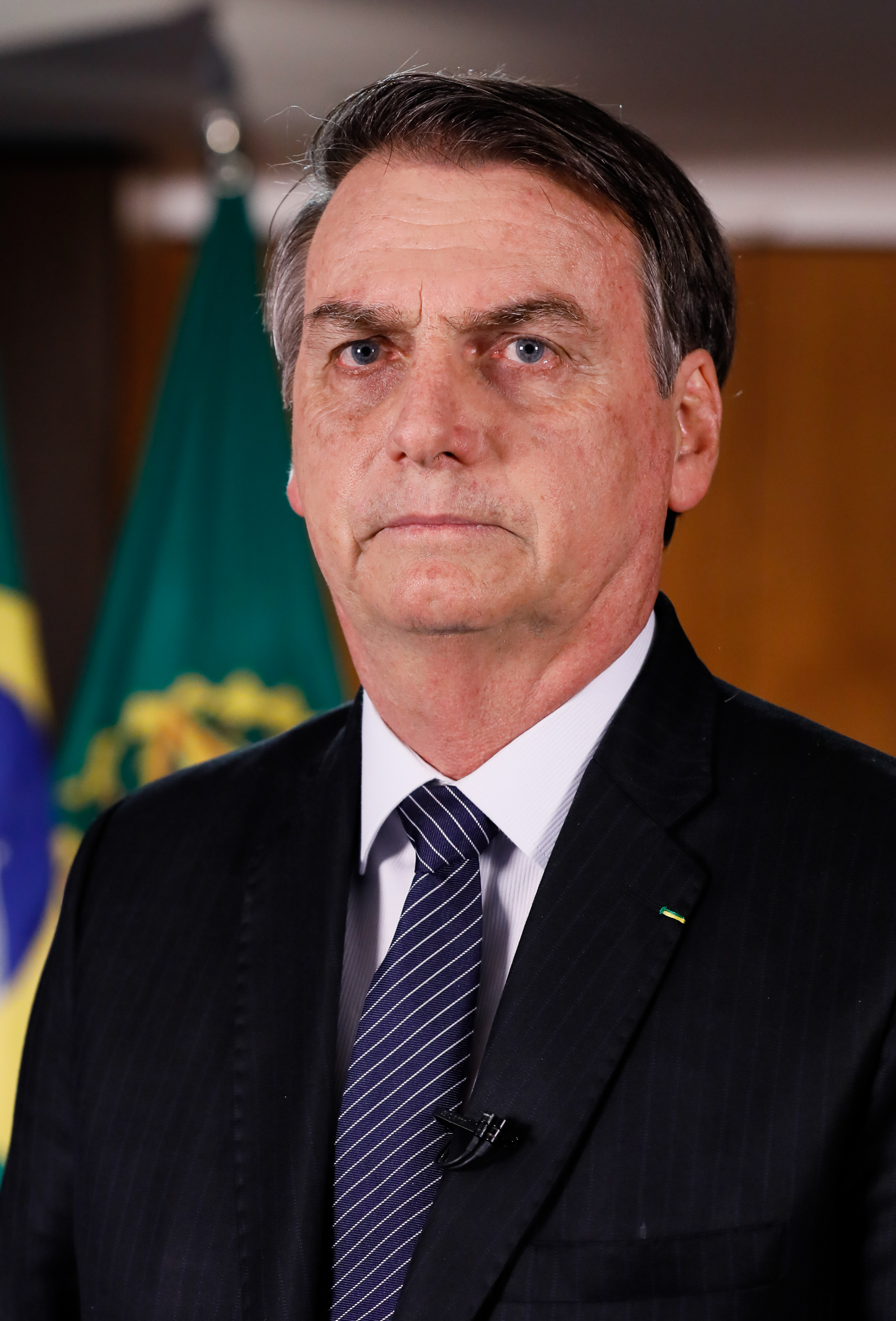
Brazil
Jair Bolsonaro, President

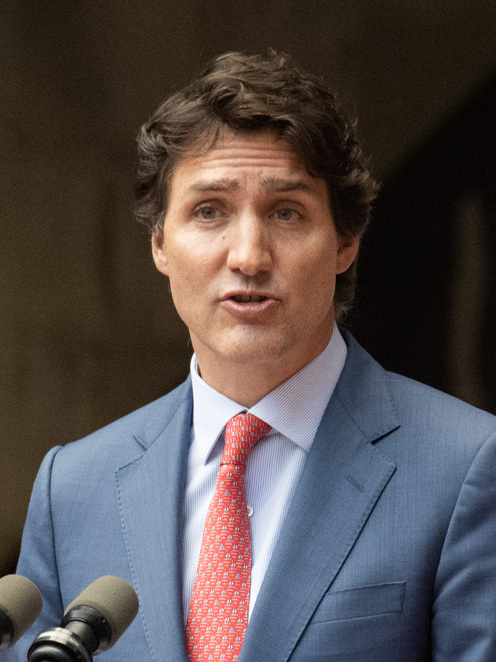
(Canada) Canada
Justin Trudeau,
Prime Minister

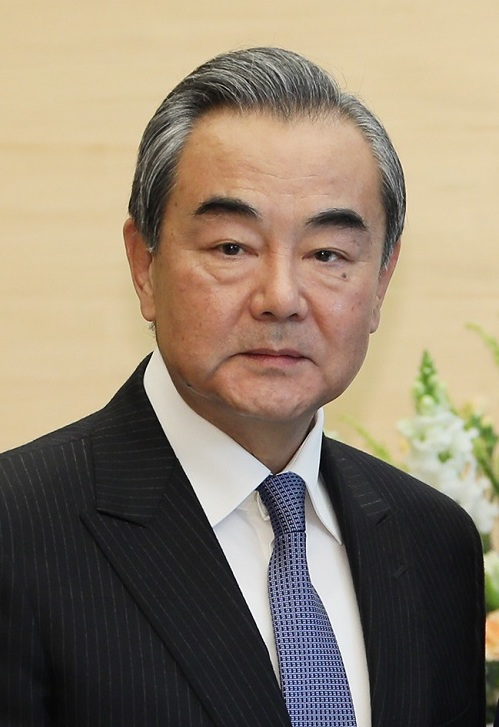
China
Wang Yi, State Councilor and Minister of Foreign Affairs

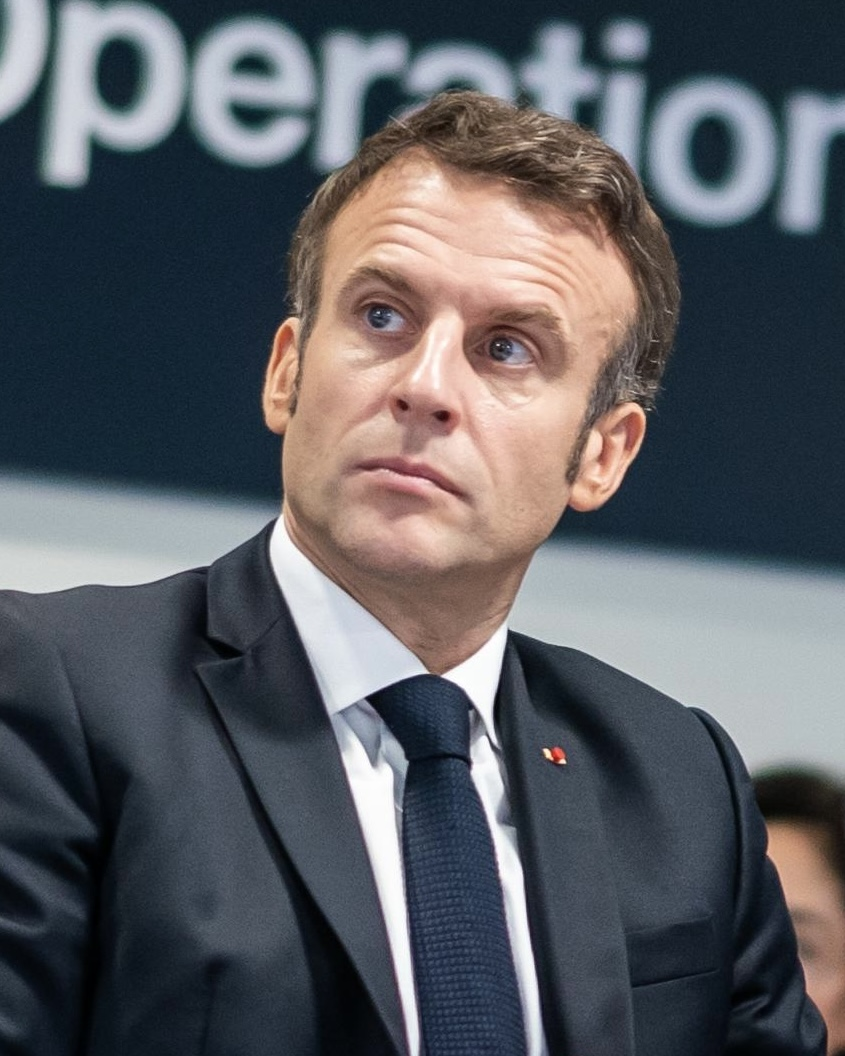
France
Emmanuel Macron, President

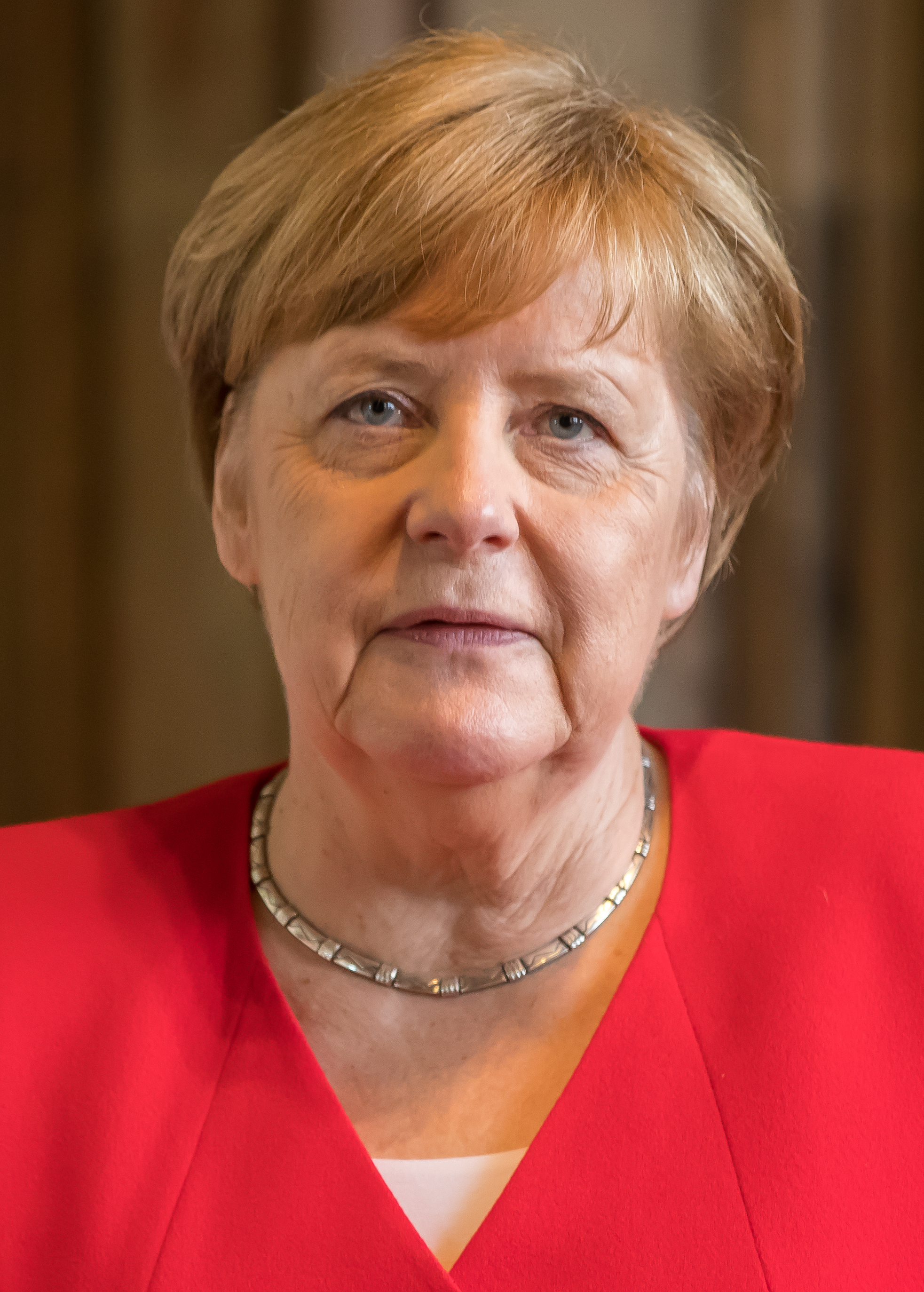
Germany
Angela Merkel, Chancellor

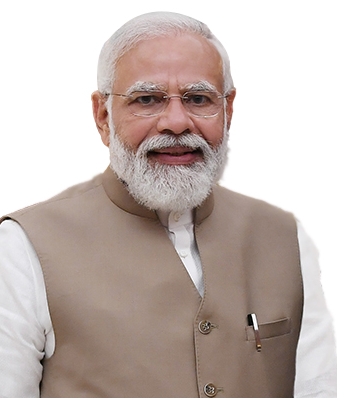
India
Narendra Modi, Prime Minister

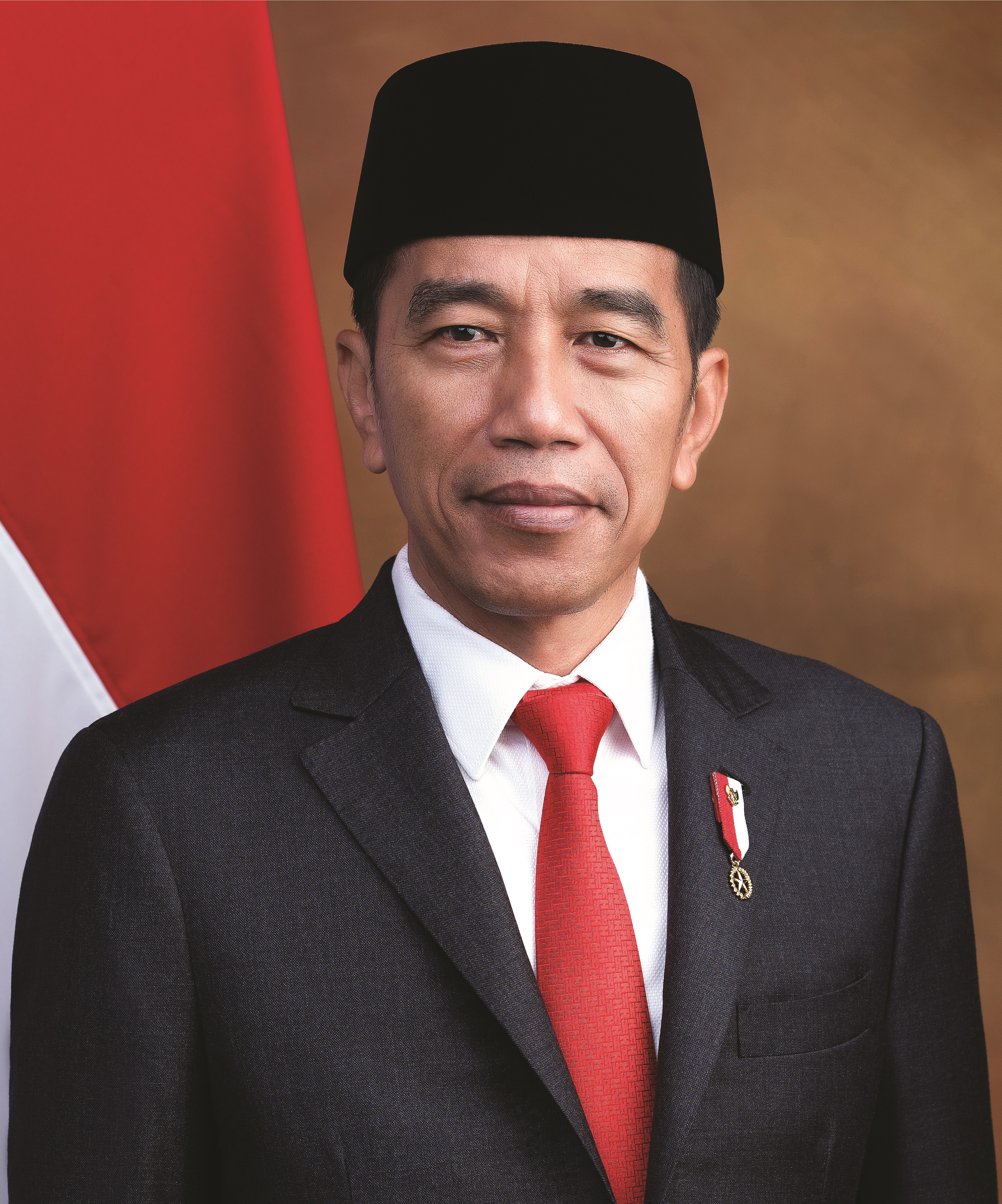
Indonesia
Joko Widodo, President

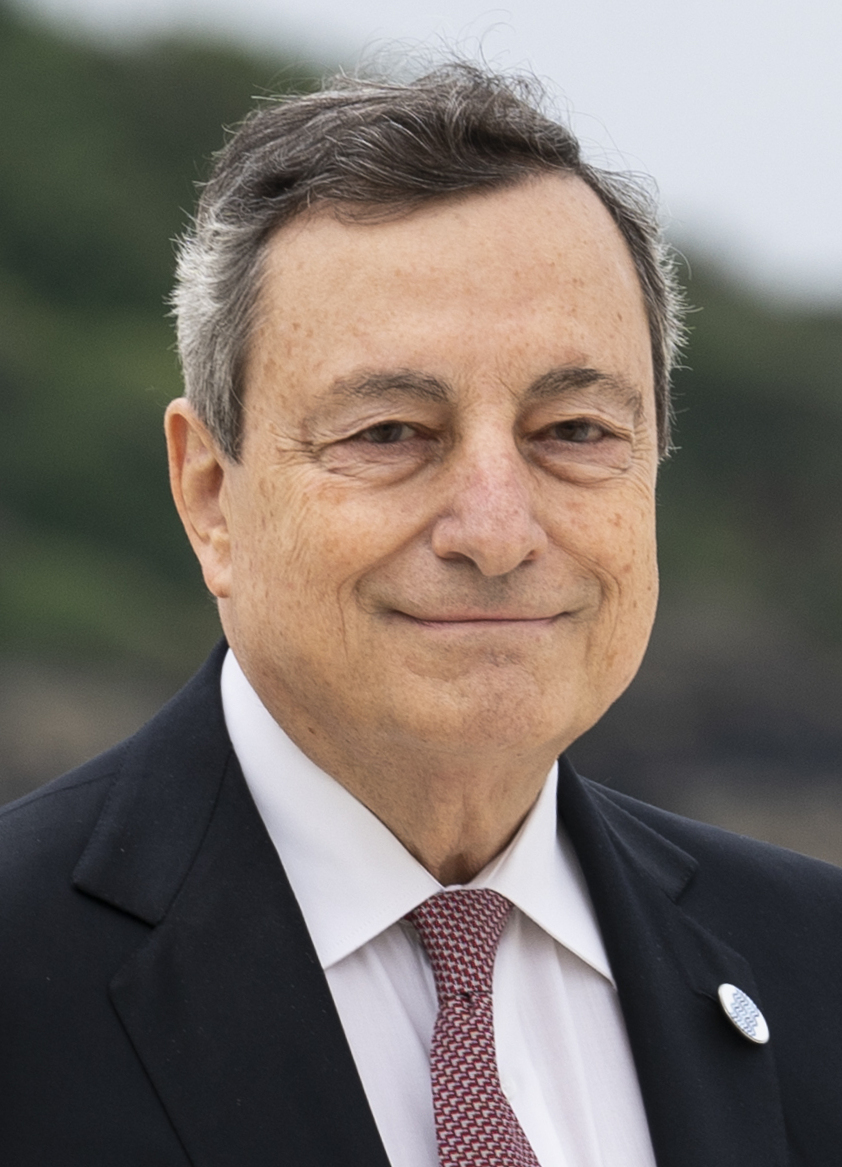
Italy
Mario Draghi, Prime Minister (Host)

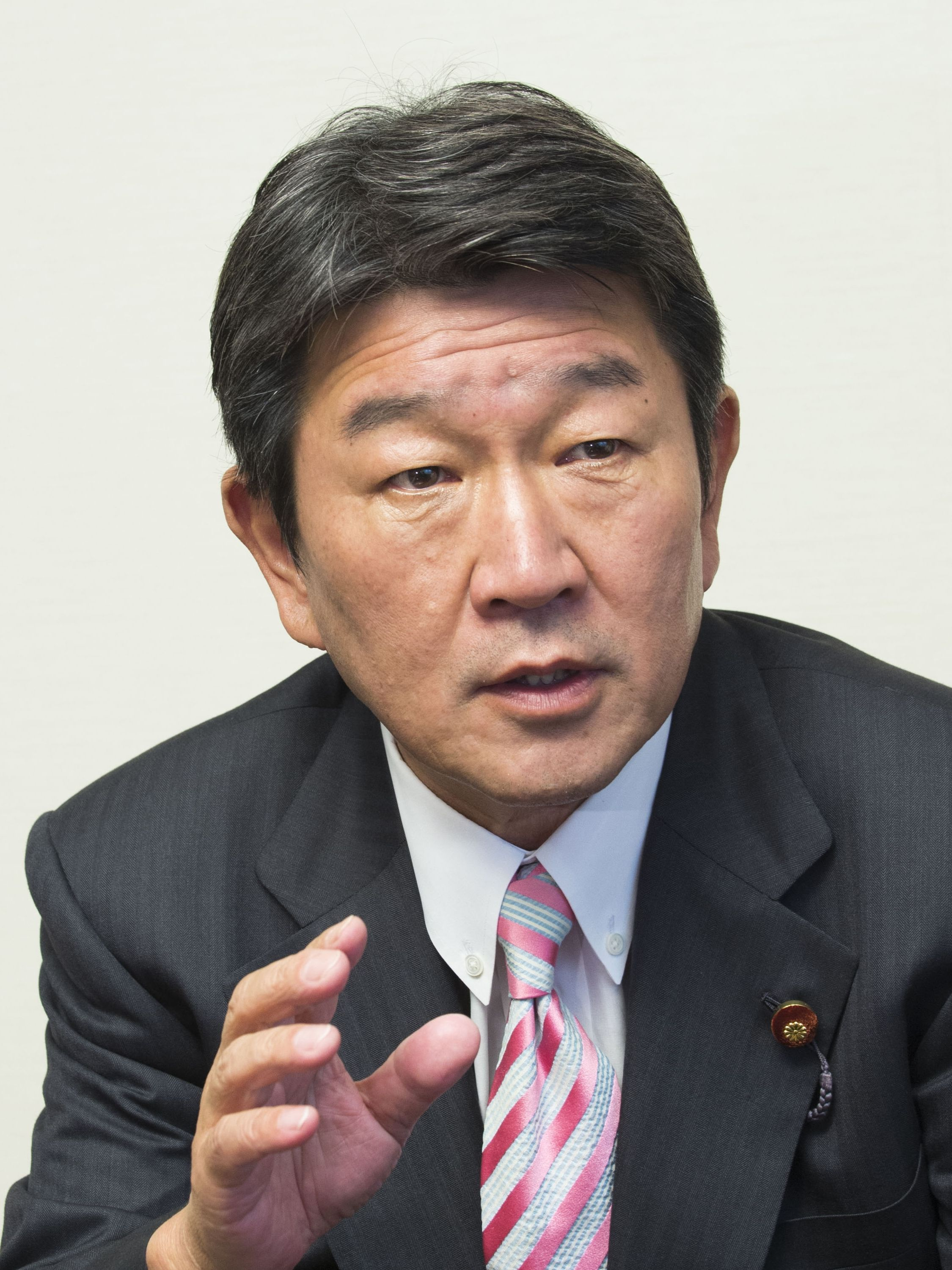
Japan
Toshimitsu Motegi, Minister for Foreign Affairs

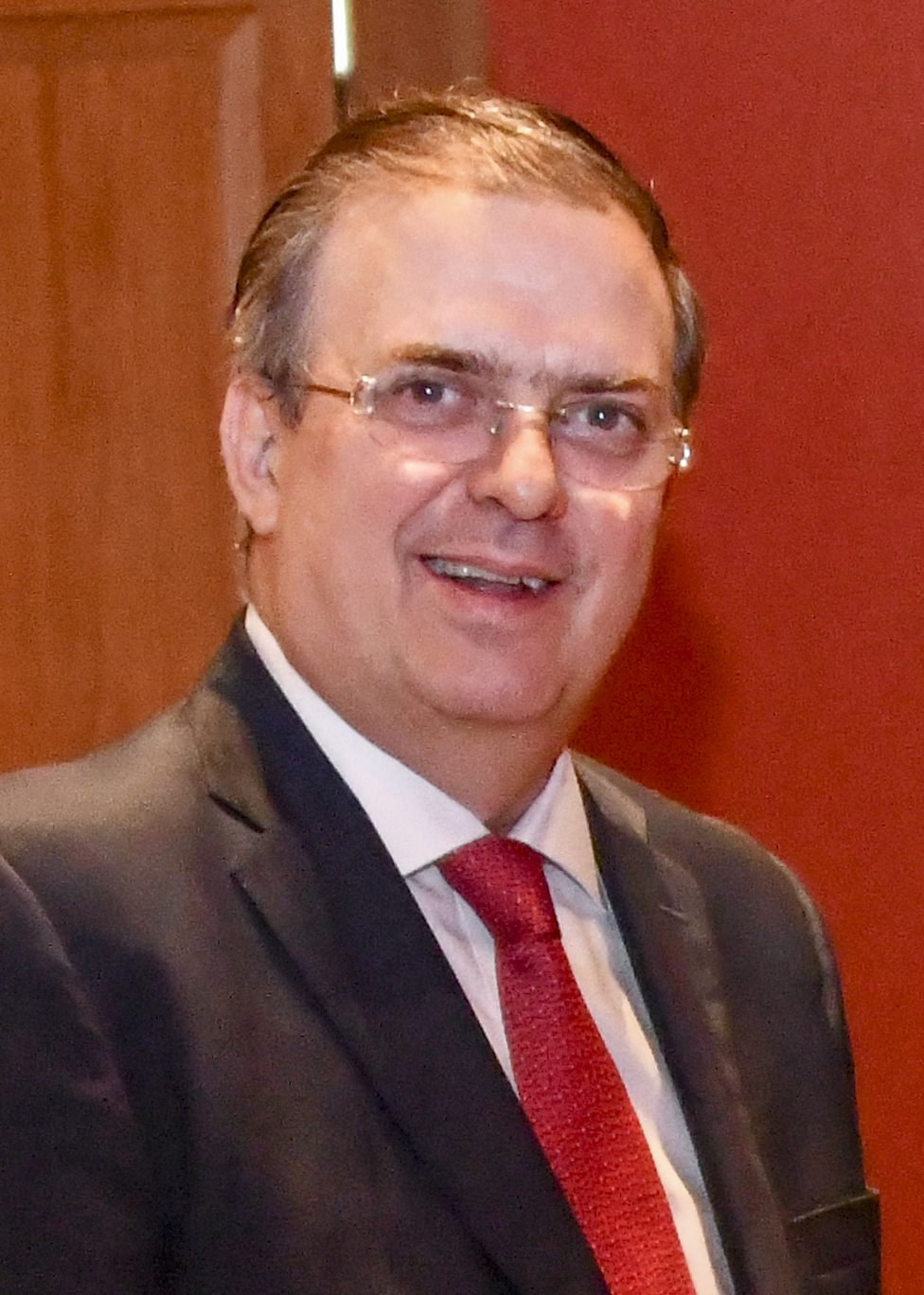
Mexico
Marcelo Ebrard, Secretary of Foreign Affairs

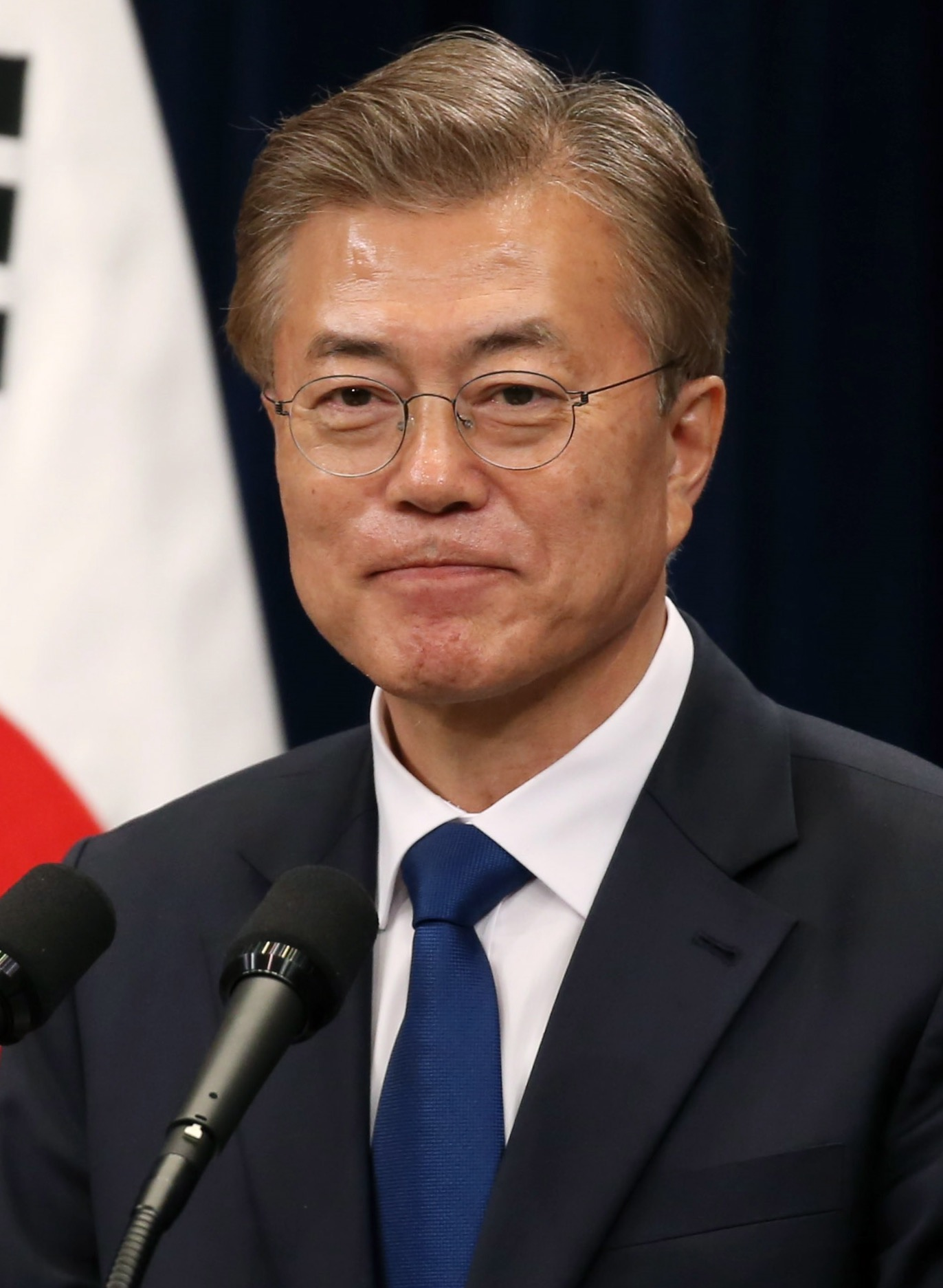
South Korea
Moon Jae-in, President

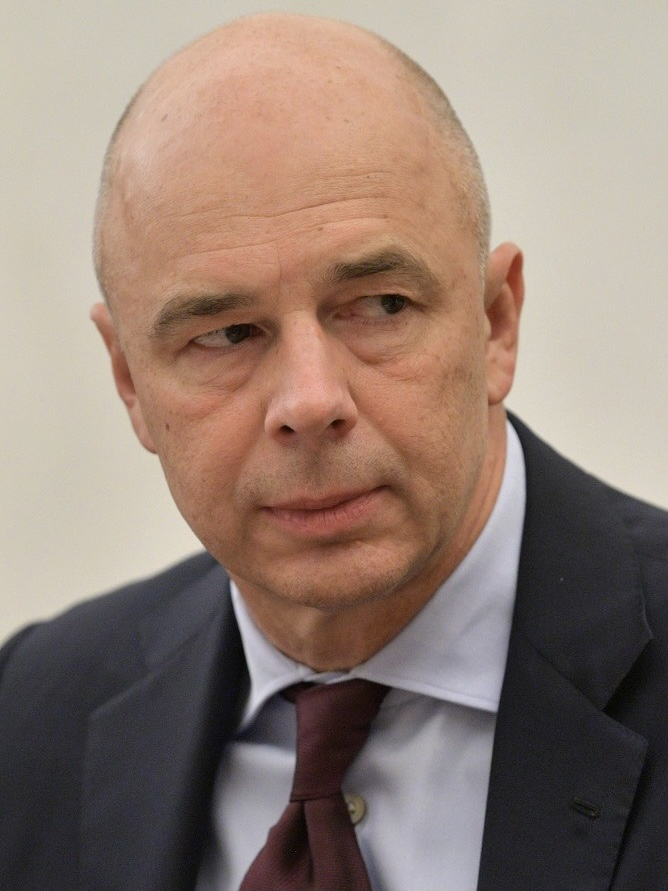
Russia
Anton Siluanov, Minister of Finance

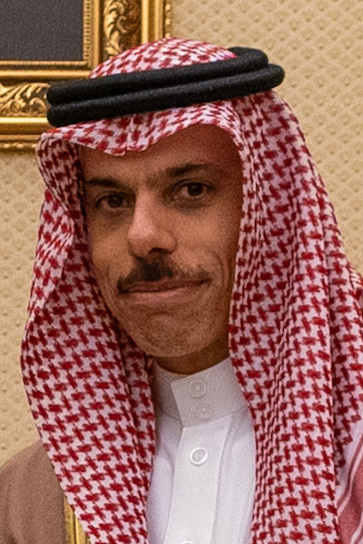
Saudi Arabia
Faisal bin Farhan Al Saud, Minister of Foreign Affairs

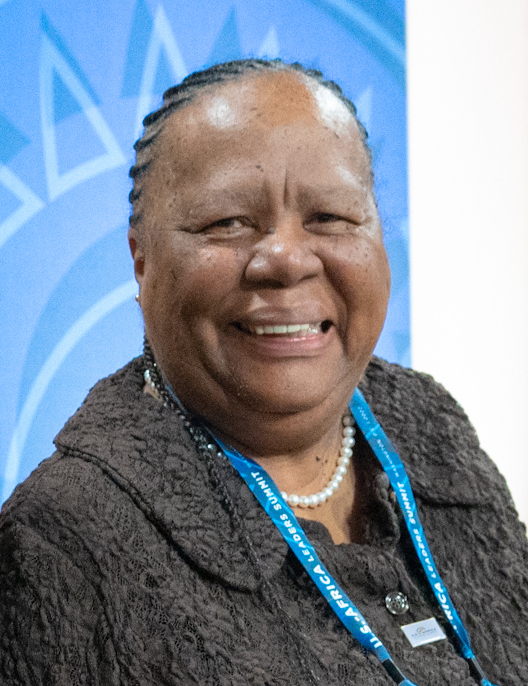
South Africa
Naledi Pandor, Minister of International Relations and Cooperation

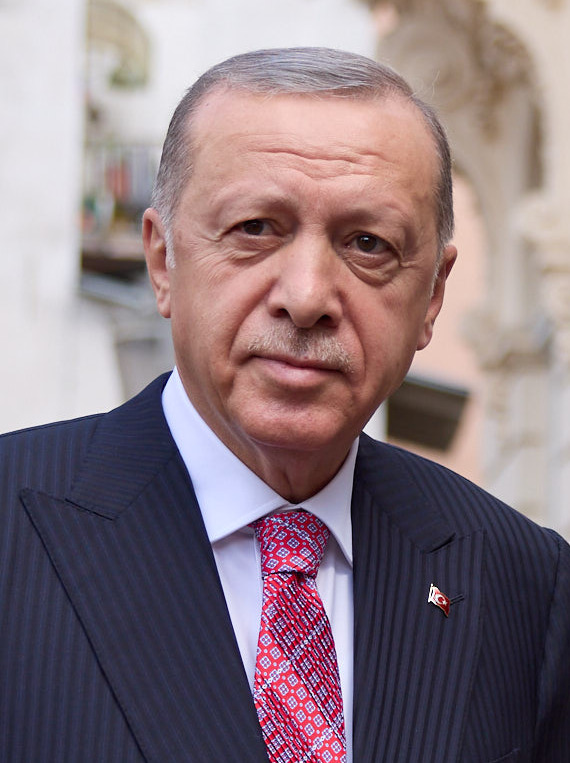
Turkey
Recep Tayyip Erdoğan, President

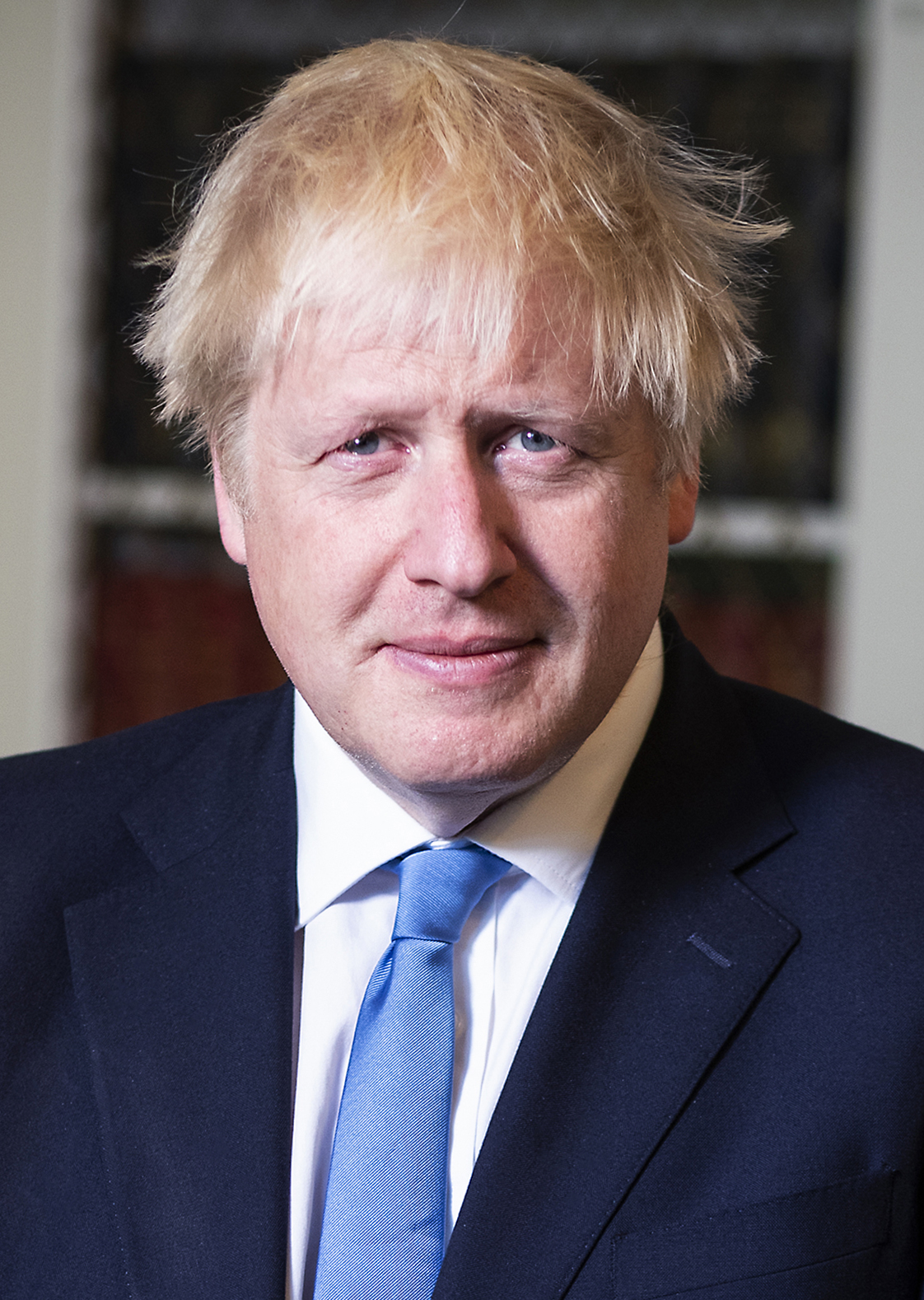
United Kingdom
Boris Johnson, Prime Minister

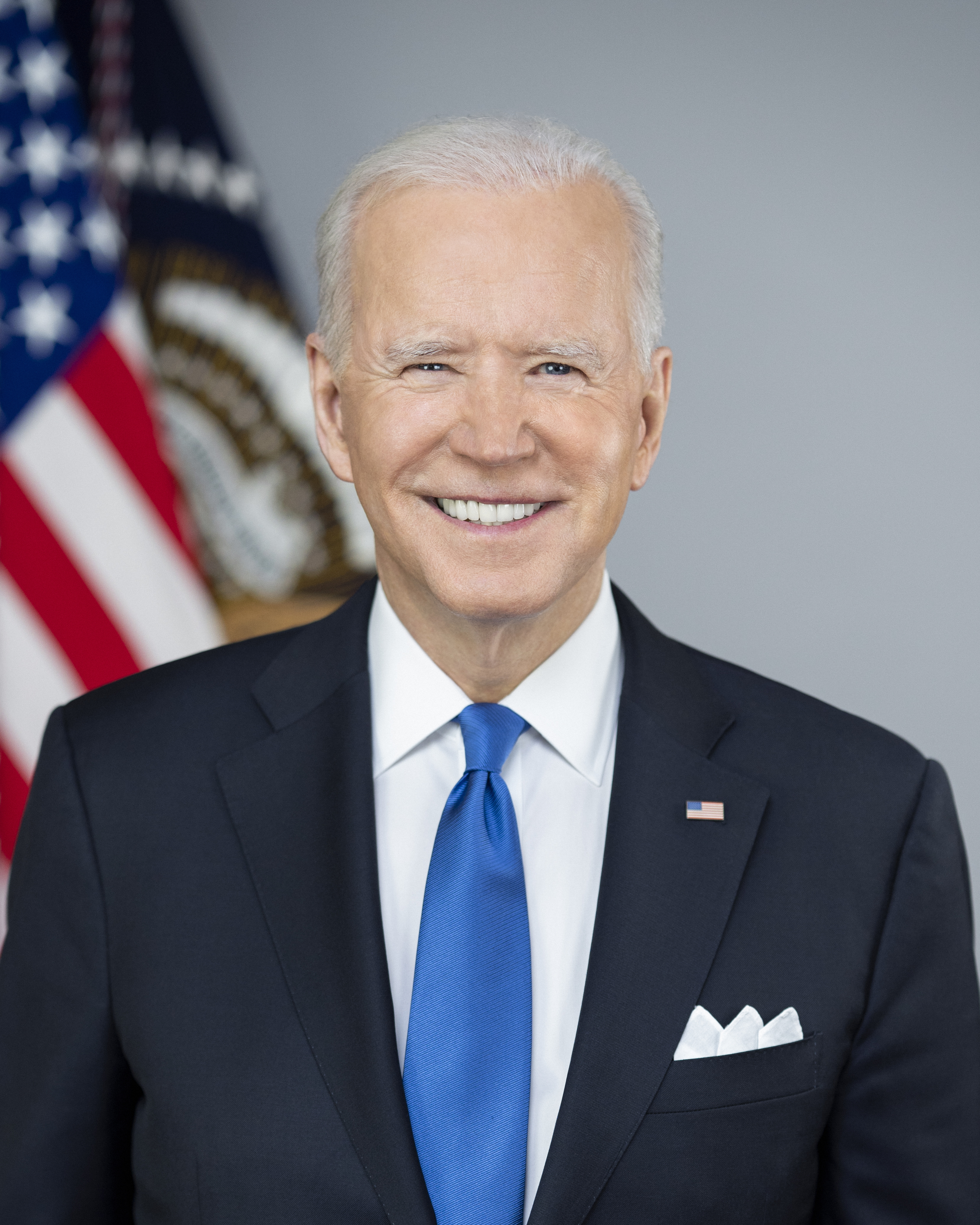
United States
Joe Biden, President

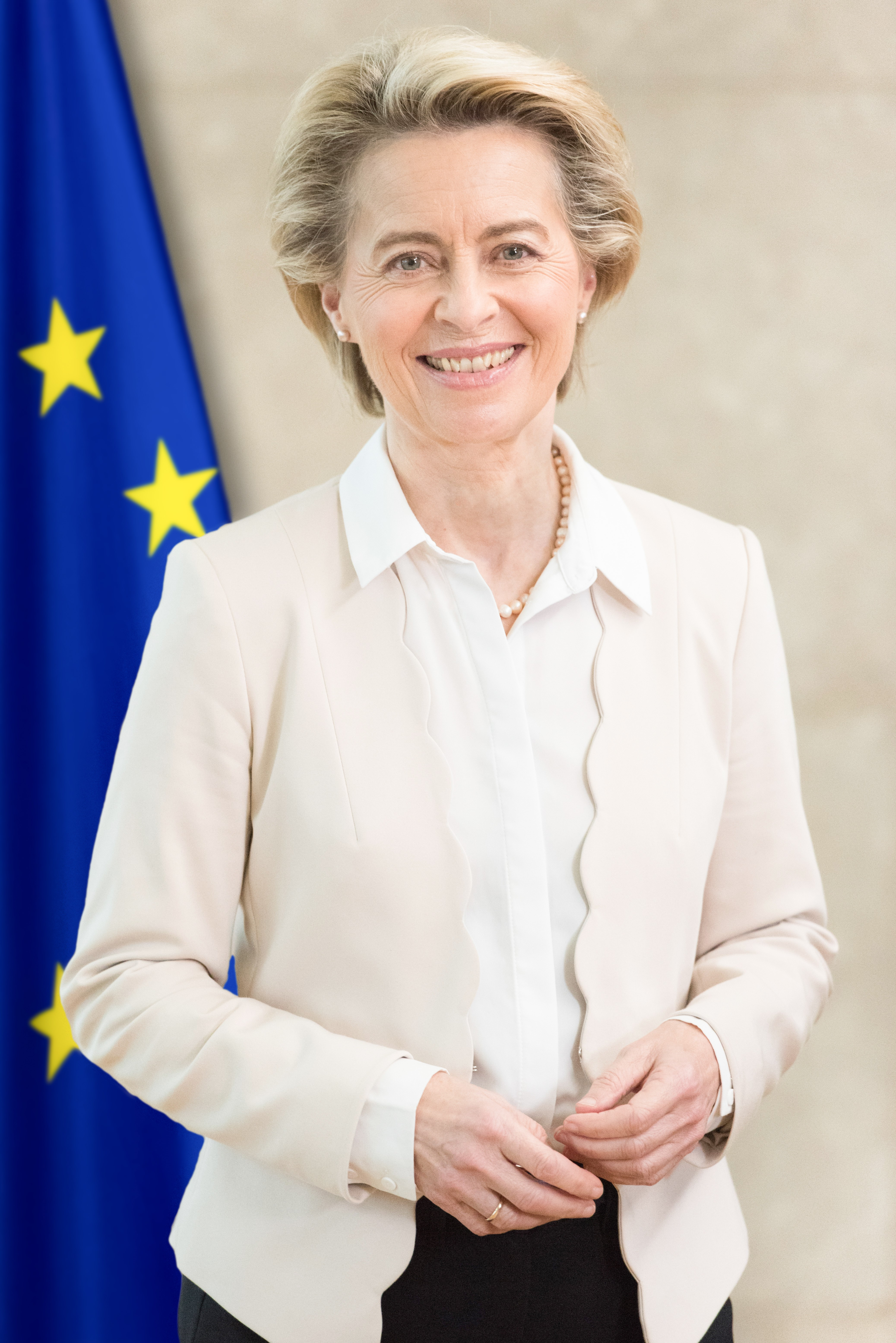
European Union
Ursula von der Leyen, President of the European Commission

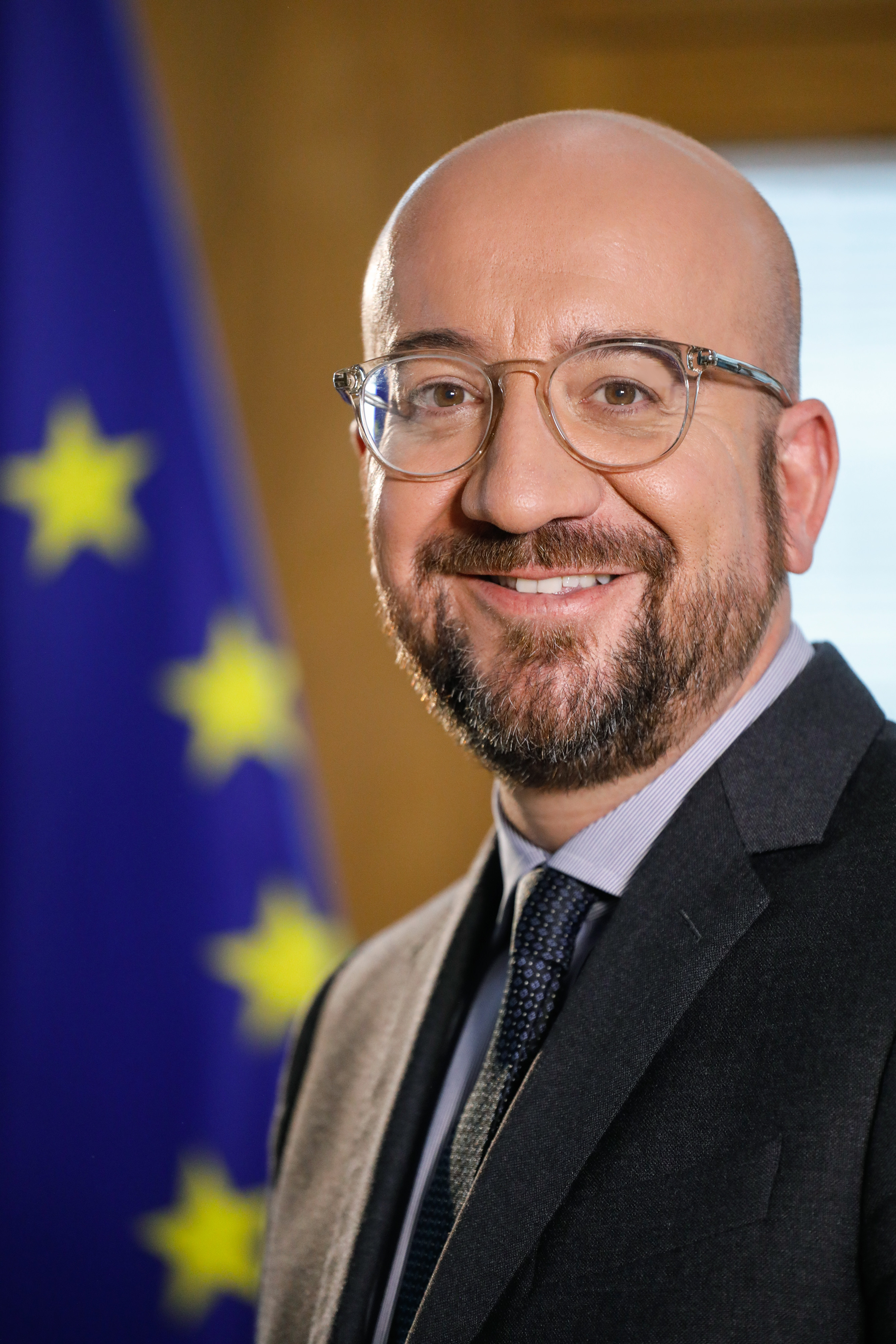
European Union
Charles Michel, President of the European Council

== Invited guests ==
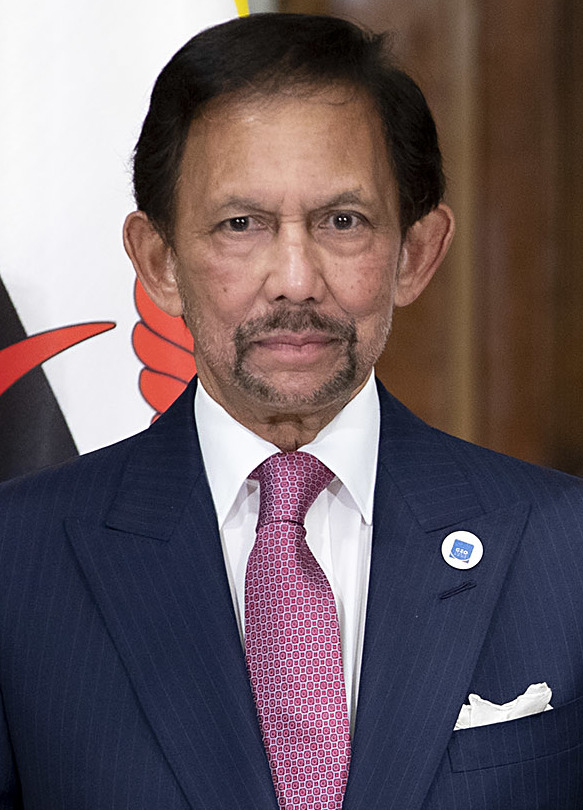
Brunei
Hassanal Bolkiah, Sultan
2021 Chairperson of Association of Southeast Asian Nations

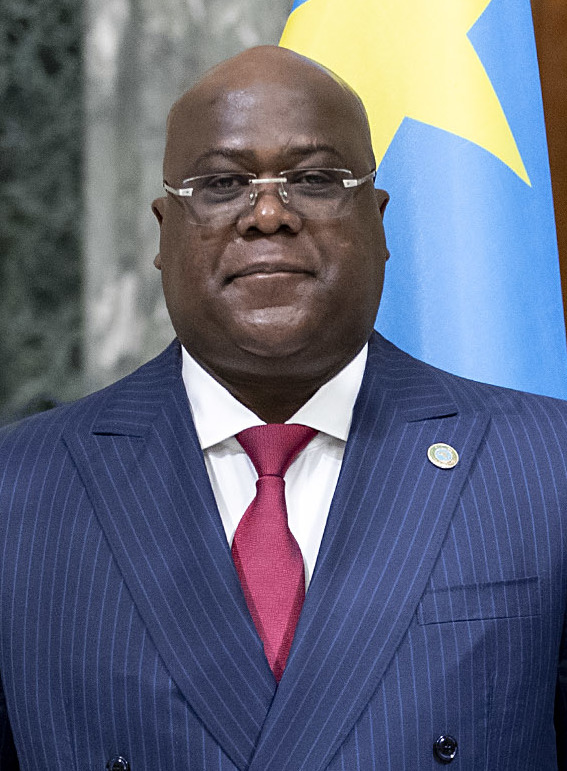
Democratic Republic of the Congo
Félix Tshisekedi, President
2021 Chairperson of the African Union

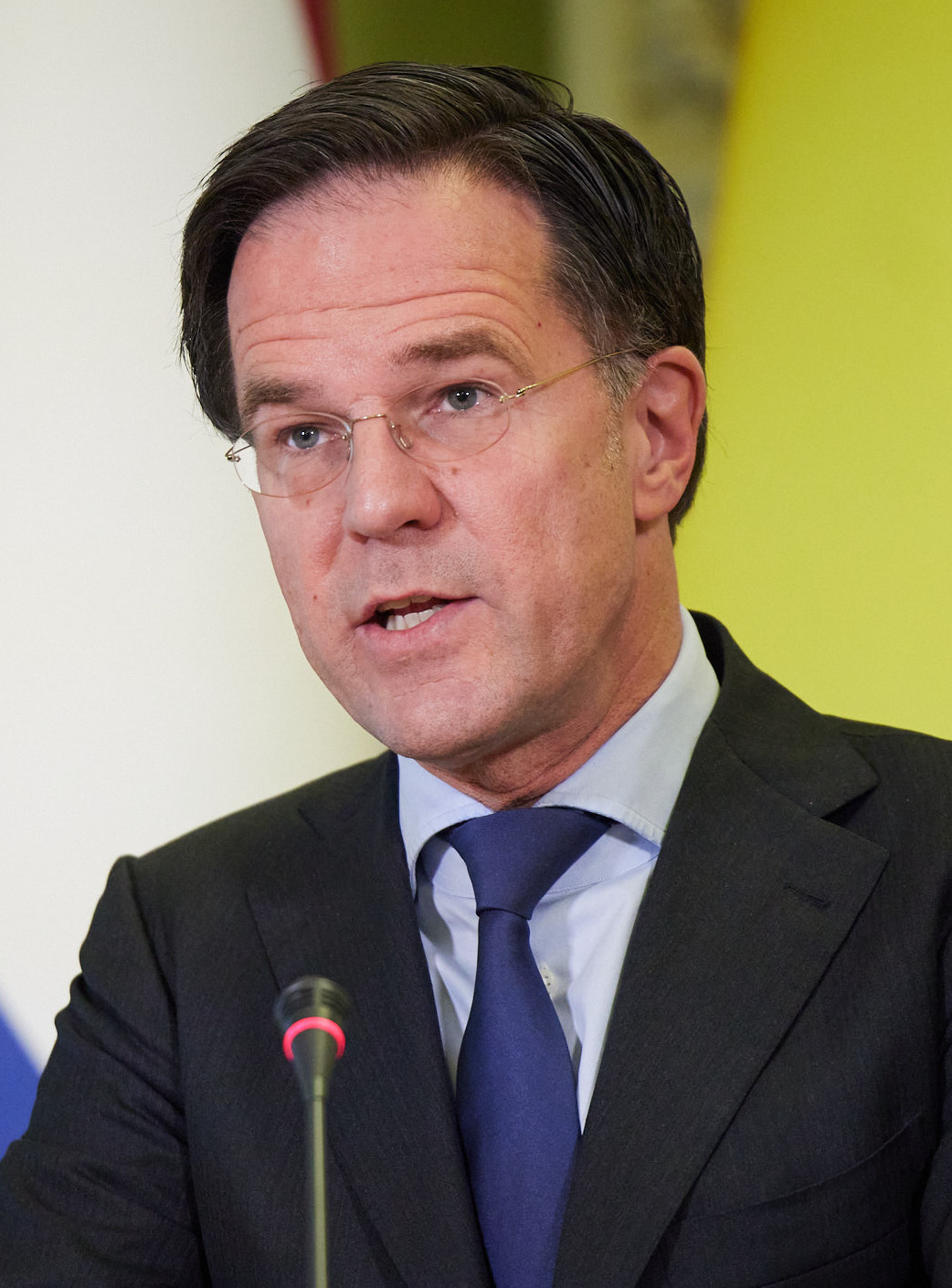
Netherlands
Mark Rutte, Prime Minister

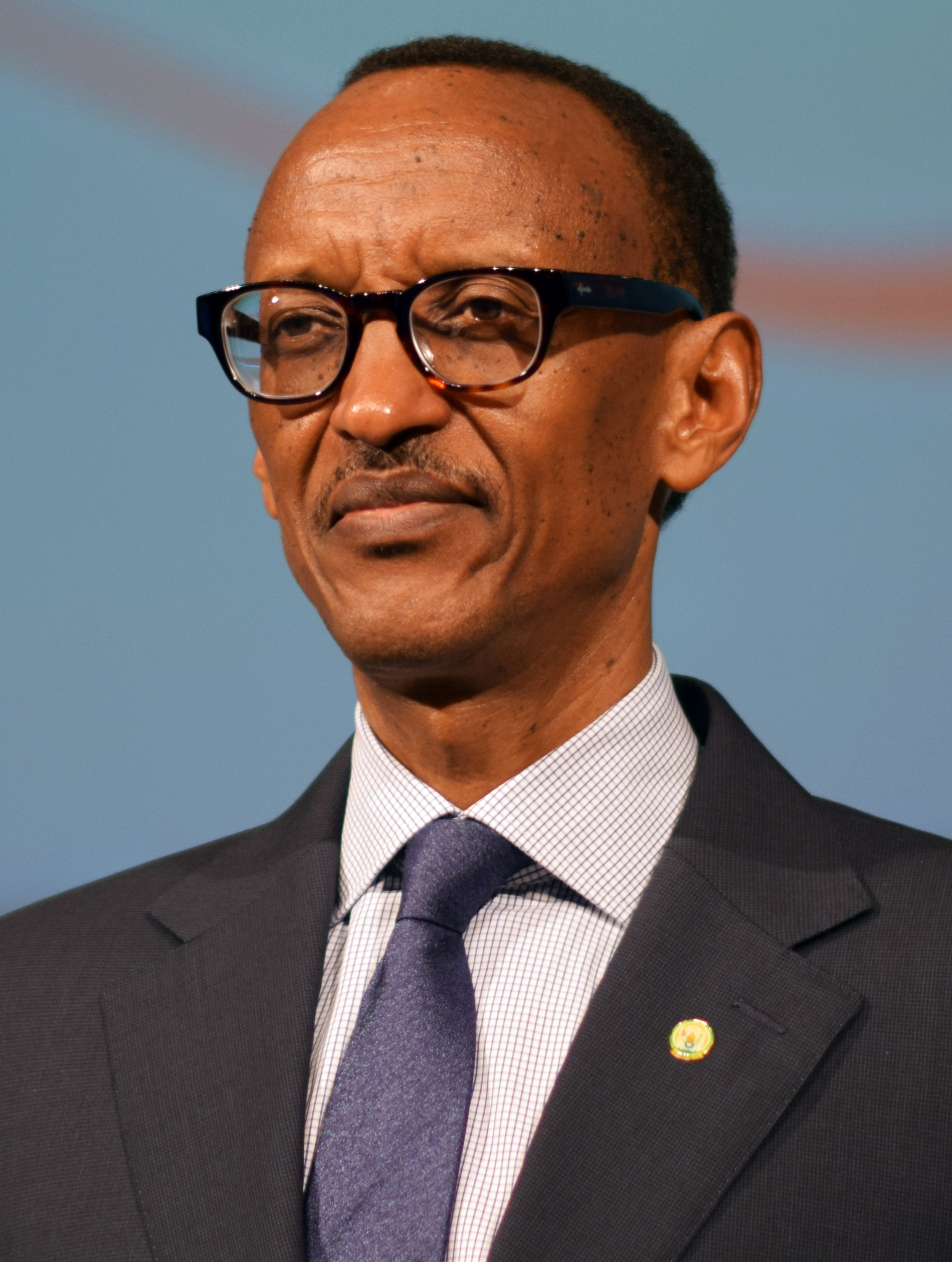
Rwanda
Paul Kagame, President, 2021 Chairperson of NEPAD

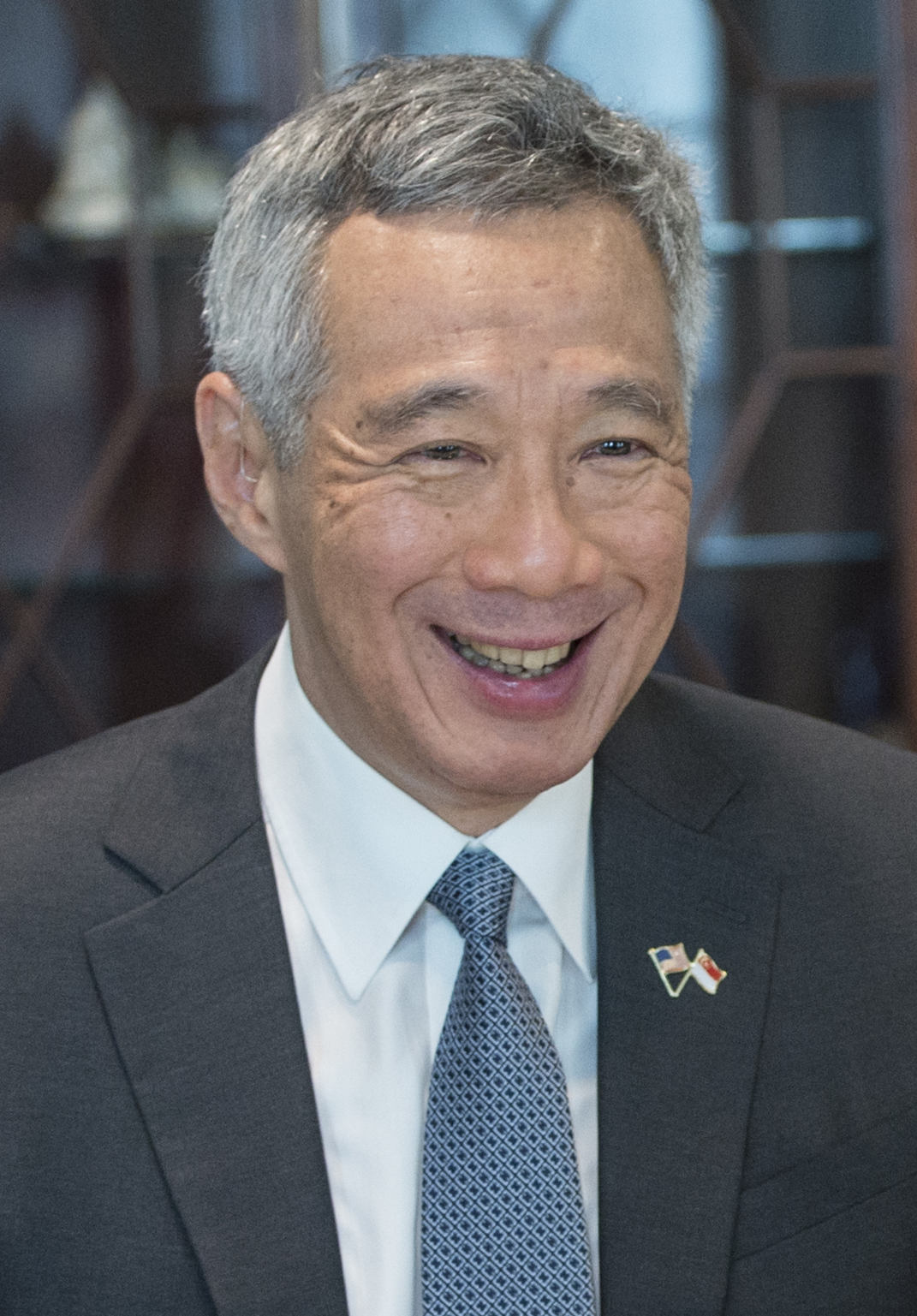
Singapore
Lee Hsien Loong, Prime Minister

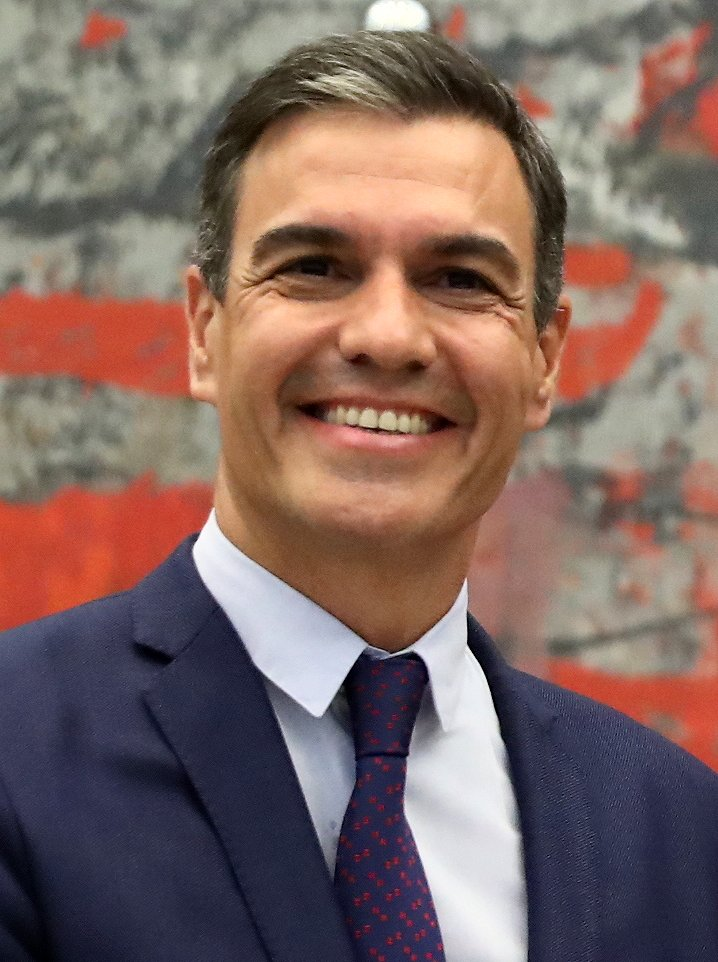
Spain
Pedro Sánchez, Prime Minister
Permanent guest invitee

=== Absent leaders ===
Five leaders did not attend the G20 summit. Of them, CCP General Secretary Xi Jinping and Russian President Vladimir Putin participated via video link; Mexican President Andrés Manuel López Obrador, who rarely leaves the country on foreign trips, sent his Secretary of Foreign Affairs Marcelo Ebrard on his behalf; and Japanese Prime Minister Fumio Kishida and South African President Cyril Ramaphosa both skipped the summit due to elections being held in each respective nation.

== Outcomes ==
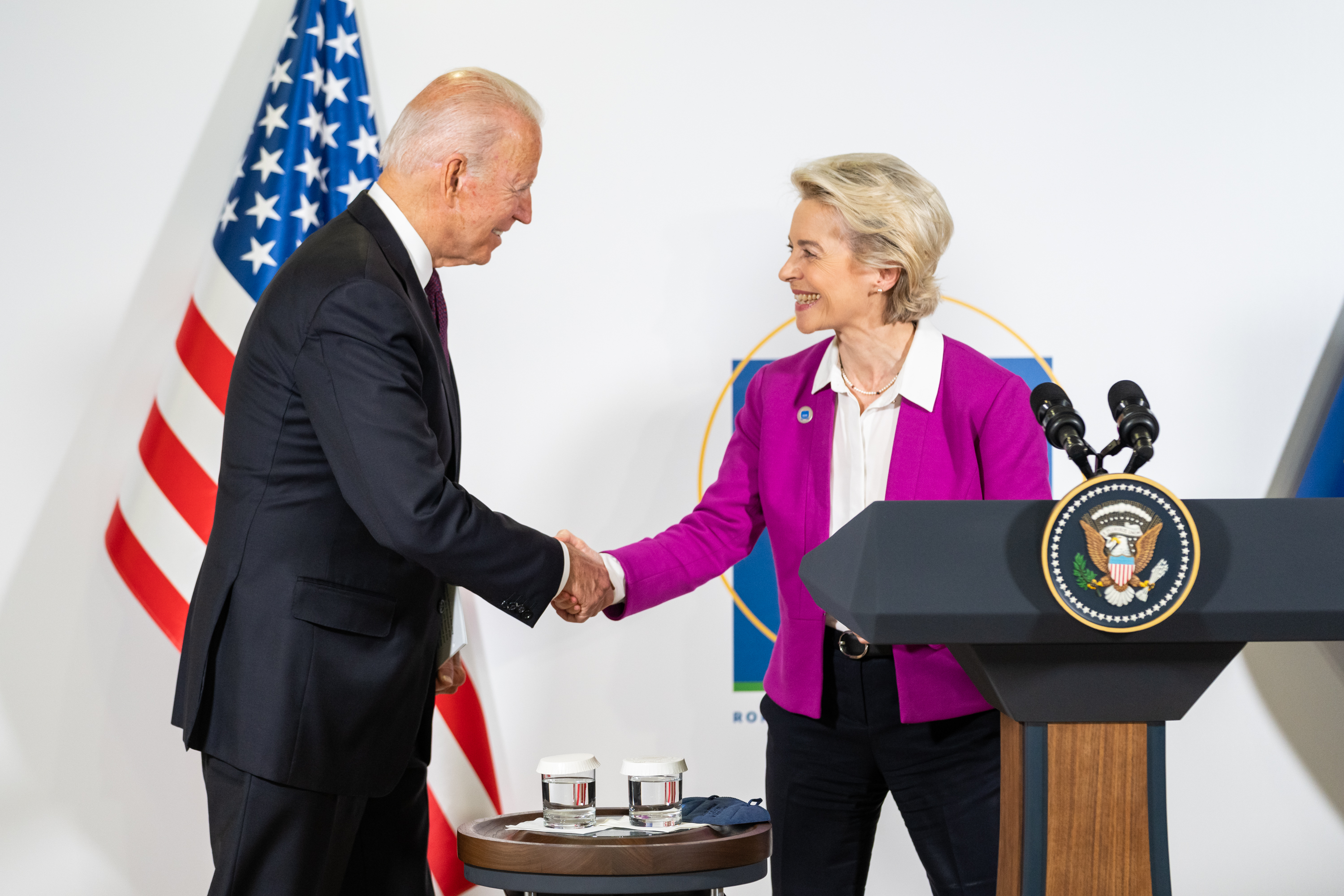
U.S. President Joe Biden and President of the European Commission Ursula von der Leyen at the G20 Rome summit, 31 October 2021

The Biden administration and the European Union reached an agreement on 30 October to roll back the steel and aluminium tariff regime that had been imposed by the Trump administration in 2018. The agreement retained some protection for American steel and aluminum producers by adopting a tariff-rate quota regime. It also ended retaliatory tariffs on American goods the EU had imposed and cancelled a scheduled tariff increase by the EU.

== See also ==
- 2020 G20 Riyadh summit
- List of G20 summits
