= Kaimar Karu =

Estonian politician (born 1980)

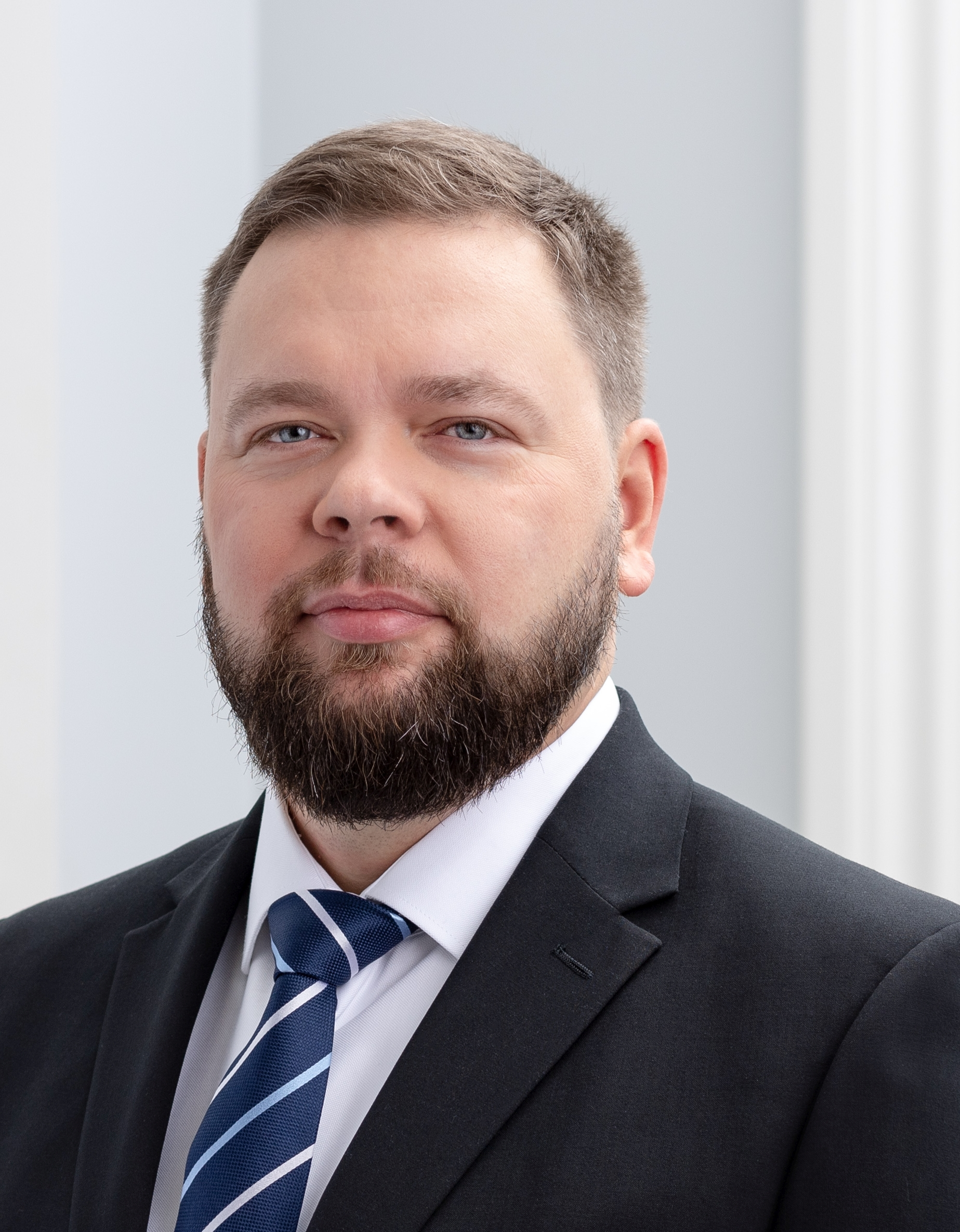

Minister of Foreign Trade and Information Technology
- In office 2 November 2019 – 17 April 2020
- Prime Minister: Jüri Ratas
- Preceded by: Kert Kingo
- Succeeded by: Raul Siem

Personal details
- Born: 30 June 1980 (age 46)
- Party: Represents Conservative People's Party of Estonia as independent politician
- Education: University of Tartu

Kaimar Karu (born 30 June 1980) is an Estonian politician. He served as Minister of Foreign Trade and Information Technology in the second cabinet of Jüri Ratas from 2 November 2019 to 17 April 2020. He represented the Conservative People's Party of Estonia (EKRE) as an independent politician.

On 17 April 2020, he announced on social media that the chairman of the Conservative People's Party Mart Helme recalled him from the government. Helme accused Karu for not respecting party values, including their anti immigration views. Karu had been under strain for not supporting changes made to the Aliens Act. Raul Siem was appointed as his replacement.

Political offices
Preceded by Kert Kingo	Minister of Entrepreneurship and Information Technology; 2019–2020	Succeeded by Raul Siem
