= Eva-Maria Liimets =

Estonian politician (born 1974)

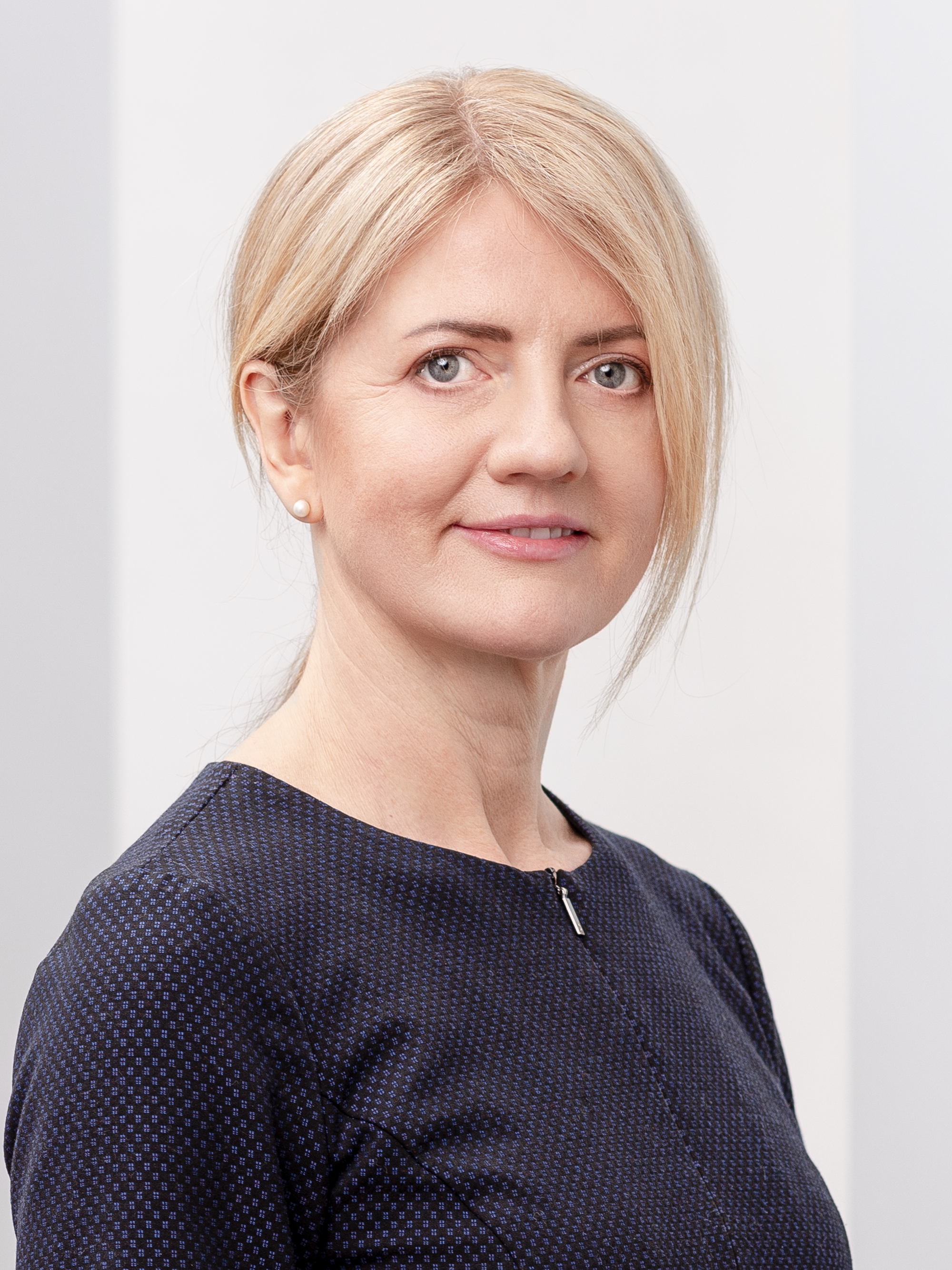

Minister of Foreign Affairs
- In office 26 January 2021 – 3 June 2022
- Prime Minister: Kaja Kallas
- Preceded by: Urmas Reinsalu
- Succeeded by: Andres Sutt (acting)

Estonian Ambassador to Czech Republic, Slovenia and Croatia
- In office 2017–2021

Personal details
- Born: 31 May 1974 (age 52) Tallinn, then part of Estonian SSR, Soviet Union
- Party: Independent (2021, 2024–present)
- Other political affiliations: Centre Party (2021–2024)
- Education: University of Tartu (BA); Estonian Business School (MBA)

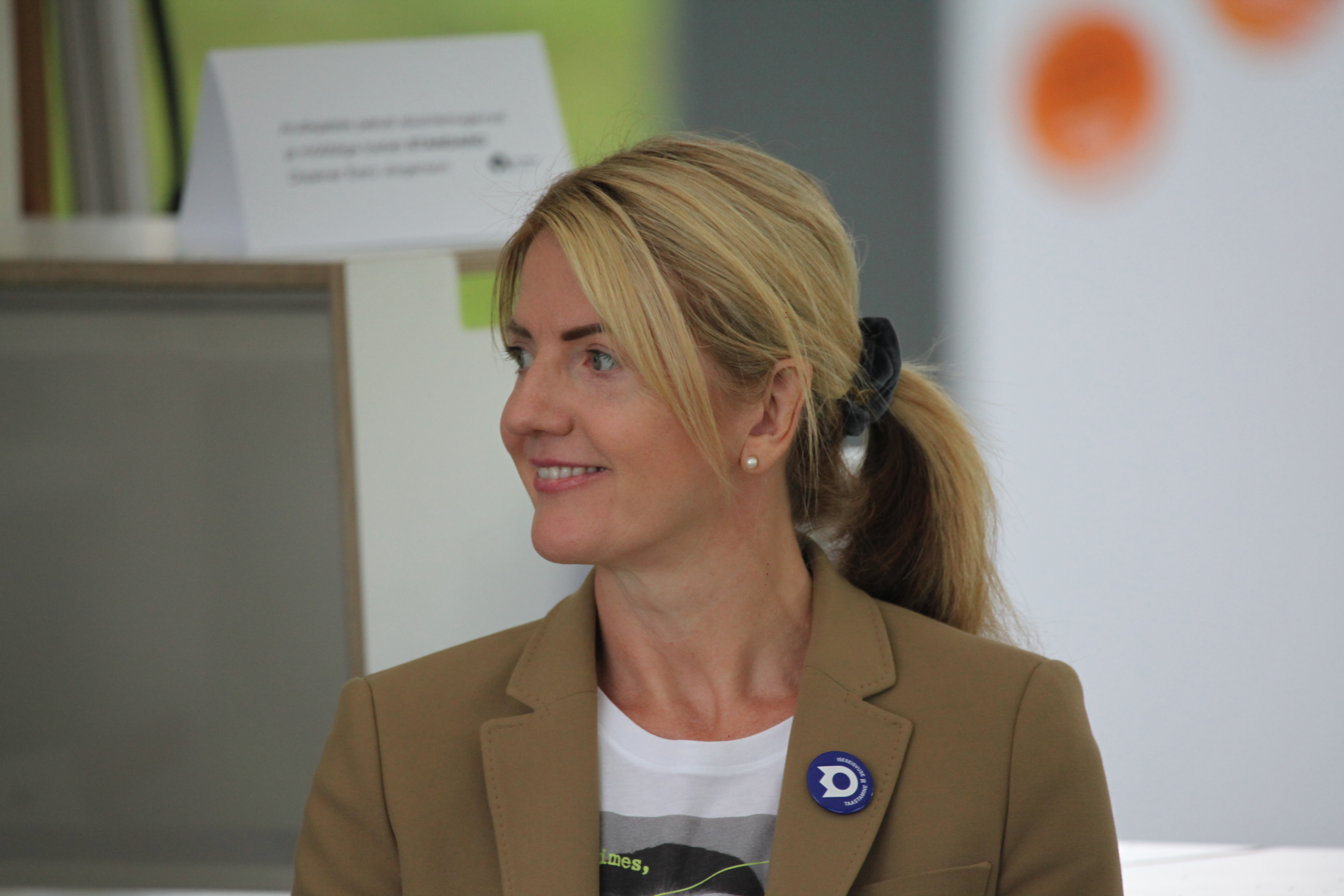
Eva-Maria Liimets at the Opinion Festival 2021 in Paide, Estonia

Eva-Maria Liimets (born 31 May 1974) is an Estonian politician. She served as the Minister of Foreign Affairs in the cabinet of Prime Minister Kaja Kallas. She was nominated by the Estonian Centre Party as an independent in January 2021 and officially joined the party on 9 June 2021. Along with all seven cabinet ministers of the governing coalition’s junior partner, she was dismissed on 3 June 2022.

== Early life ==
She has a degree in public administration from the University of Tartu and a master’s degree in international business management (MBA) from the Estonian Business School. She is a graduate of the 19th International Training Course in Security Policy at the Geneva Centre for Security Policy (GCSP).

== Civil service ==
She served as Estonia's ambassador to the Czech Republic with credentials also to Slovenia and Croatia.

== Minister of Foreign Affairs (2021-2022) ==
Shortly after Liimets took office, the foreign ministry announced an "arctic month" starting from 28 January 2021, amid plans by Estonia to apply for observer status at the Arctic Council in 2021. "Developments in the Arctic should be a concern for everyone, as the climate change there affects the whole world," Liimets said. Shortly before the Russian invasion of Ukraine, in December 2021 Liimets stated that there needed to be sanctions against Russia for its "potential aggression" on Ukraine's borders and said Russia was a security threat. After the start of the invasion, Liimets became a strong supporter of Ukraine stating that there must be international pressure on Russia. She also supported the accession of Finland and Sweden to NATO.

== Post-ministerial career ==
Since leaving the post she has been ESTDEV's programme manager for Democracy and the Rule of Law, where she has supported Ukraine's accession to the European Union. In January 2024, she left the Centre Party citing too much confusion in the party's image and messages and the departure of like-minded people in the party.

== Personal life ==
Liimets is divorced and is the mother of one child. In addition to her native Estonian, she speaks English, German, Italian, and Russian.

Political offices
Preceded by Urmas Reinsalu	Minister of Foreign Affairs; 2021–2022	Succeeded by Andres Sutt; Acting
