= Constantine Palace =

Palace in St. Petersburg, Russia

- Константиновский дворец
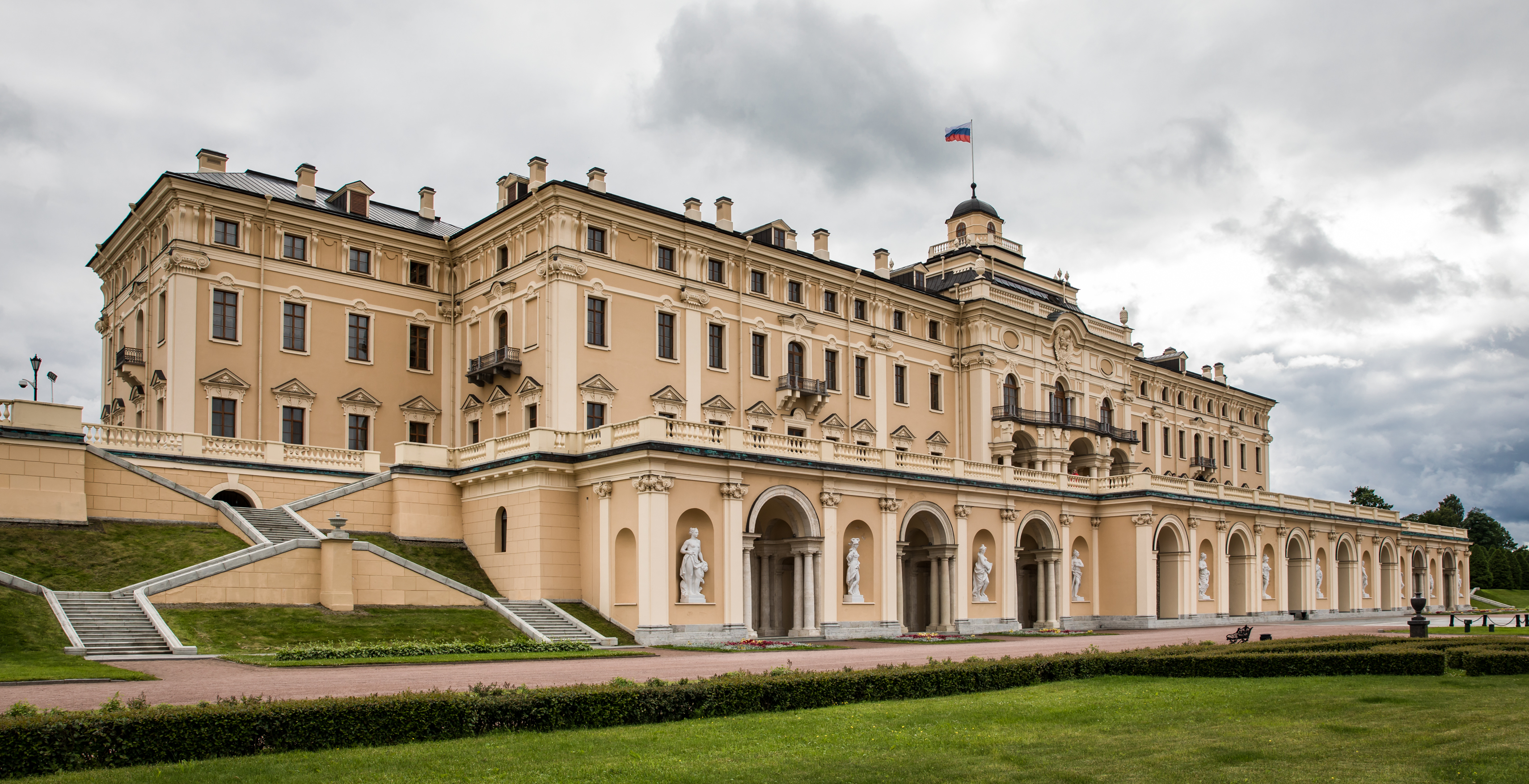
- Interactive map of Constantine Palace
- Location: Strelna, St. Petersburg, Russia
- Coordinates: 59°51′14″N 30°3′30″E
- Designer: Nicola Michetti; Jean-Baptiste Le Blond
- Type: Palace
- Material: Petrine Baroque
- Completion date: 1720
- Website: www.konstantinpalace.ru

Constantine Palace (Russian: Константиновский дворец), also known as the Great Strelna Palace (Russian: Большой Стрельнинский дворец), is a Russian imperial palace built in 1720 and located in Strelna in St. Petersburg. It is currently managed by the Directorate of the President of the Russian Federation.

== History ==
The palace first began construction from the rule of Peter the Great. The palace and surrounding gardens were first completed in early 18th century, with expansions constructed until early 19th century. The estate was then passed down to Paul I, then later to Konstantin Pavlovich, which is the palace's namesake. This estate remained in the possession of the Russian imperial family until the Bolshevik Revolution in 1917.

=== "Russian Versailles" ===
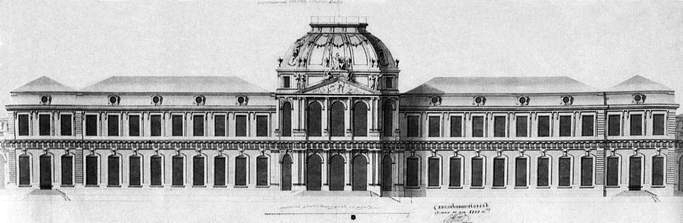
An architecture plan by Jean-Baptiste Le Blond in 1717

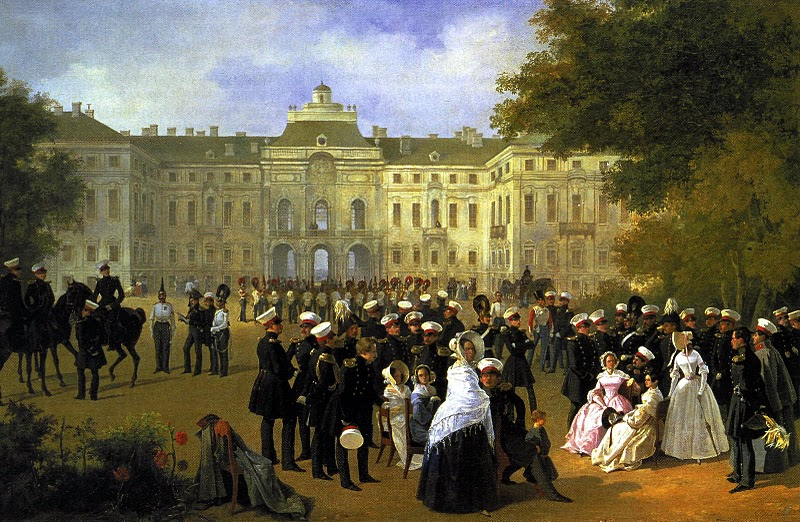
Painting of a reception in the palace in the 19th century

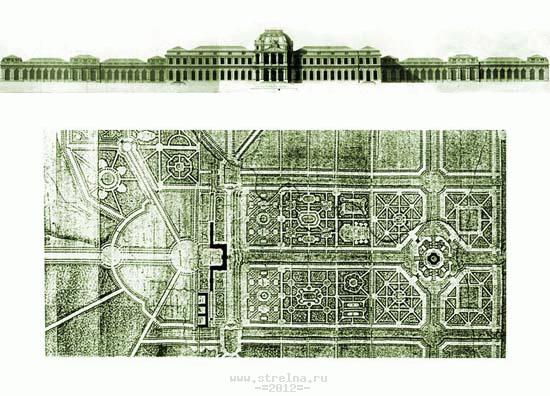
A floorplan of the palace in 1717

As early as 1709, Peter the Great wanted to build a large imperial palace that would surpass the Palace of Versailles in France. On May 26, 1710, he "deigned to consider the plan for the location of the palace building, gardens and parks." The project, completed by the Italian architect Sebastiano Cipriani, turned out to be too complex. In 1715, contracts were concluded with the famous French architect Jean-Baptiste Le Blond and the architect Carlo Bartolomeo Rastrelli, with Le Blond getting the contract. However, Le Blond died in 1719, and the design was continued by the Italian Nicola Michetti. The architectural dominant of the complex, the Constantine Palace, was laid according to Michetti's design on June 22, 1720.

In order to surpass the palace and park ensembles of Europe, the fountains and their accompanying mechanisms had to function around the clock for several months, maintaining the necessary water level in the storage tank. However, this plan soon ran into a problem, where it was necessary to raise the water level in order for the fountains to function properly. This would have likely led to the flooding of the Strelka and Kikenka river basins, since dozens of square kilometers of the surrounding territory have an elevation below 10 metres (33 ft), and some are even below sea level.

Hydraulic structures capable of solving the problem would have cost Peter I too much, and the landscape farther to the west would also be much more suitable with a natural water supply. The German hydraulic engineer Burkhard Münnich succeeded in persuading the Tsar in changing course, and the construction of the fountains ended.

=== Grand Duke ===
In the 1750s, the completion of the palace was entrusted to the architect Francesco Bartolomeo Rastrelli; the palace was redesigned, and a large grand staircase was added to the eastern wing. However, the work was again not completed. In the brickwork of the Strelna Palace, Rastrelli used unusually large bricks brought from the construction of the Rundāle Palace. It was probably under Michetti's architectural influence that Count Rastrelli designed a three-part through arch on the side of the main façade of the Winter Palace.

In 1797, by the order of Paul I, the estate was passed down to his son Konstantin. In 1802, the architect Andrey Voronikhin redesigned the interiors in an antique style. Following a fire in 1803, Voronikhin and Luigi Rusca made significant structural and decorative changes, including adding a belvedere and a ceremonial enfilade on the Piano nobile. The rich pictorial decoration was executed by artists Fyodor Shcherbakov and Giacomo Ferrari. In 1847-1851, by order of the new owner, Grand Duke Konstantin Nikolaevich, another reconstruction was carried out by Christian Meyer and Andrei Stackenschneider: bay windows and balconies appeared on the facades; private chambers were decorated in the eclectic style. A house church was built in the palace.

Then, the large family of Konstantin Konstantinovich (known under the poetic pseudonym K.R. ) lived here, mainly only in the summer and autumn, and the actual owner was his brother Dmitry Konstantinovich with his mother, Alexandra Iosifovna.

The palace housed the personal apartments of the Greek queen Olga Konstantinovna, who lived in Russia after the murder of her husband George I.

=== Soviet years ===
After the October Revolution, the palace housed the First Strelna School-Colony. In 1937, a sanatorium was opened there, and then courses for advanced training of senior and middle command personnel of the Navy were located there.

During WWII, the palace and park complex in Strelna was almost completely destroyed; only the stone frame of the palace building remained. The palace was completely restored by 1950.

The cadets of the Arctic School, which was housed in the palace in 1955, actively participated in the restoration of the palace. For 45 years, the school trained hydrometeorologists, aerologists, radio operators, electrical engineers and ship mechanics for polar stations and the merchant fleet. In 1990 the school was closed, leaving the palace without an owner.

=== 21st century ===
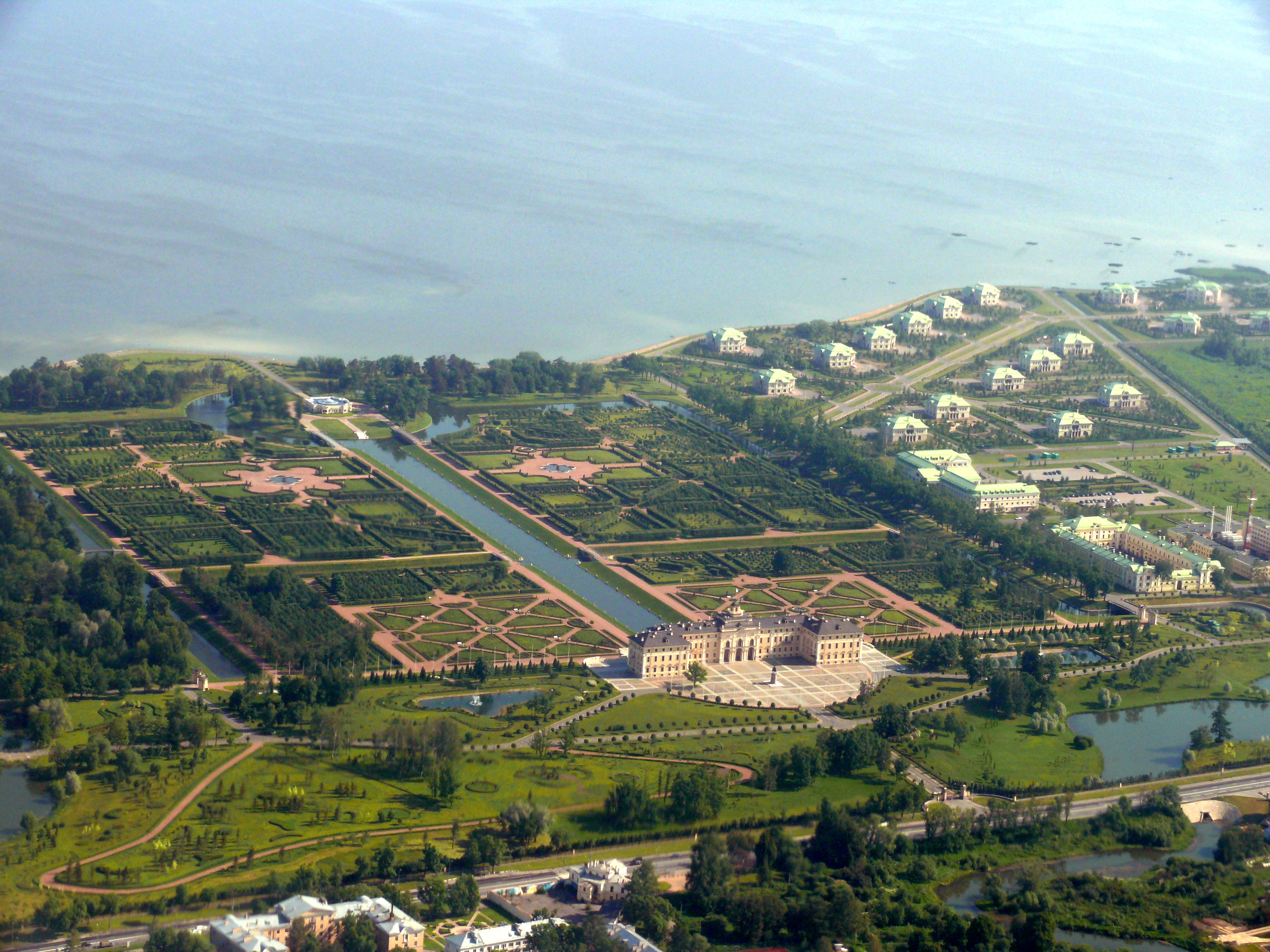
Aerial view of the palace in 2012

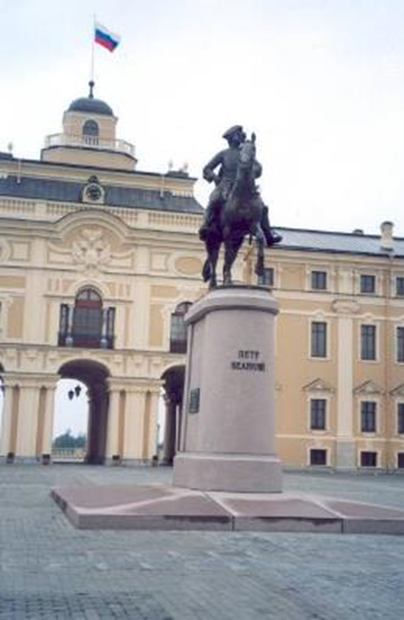
Statue of Peter the Great in the palace

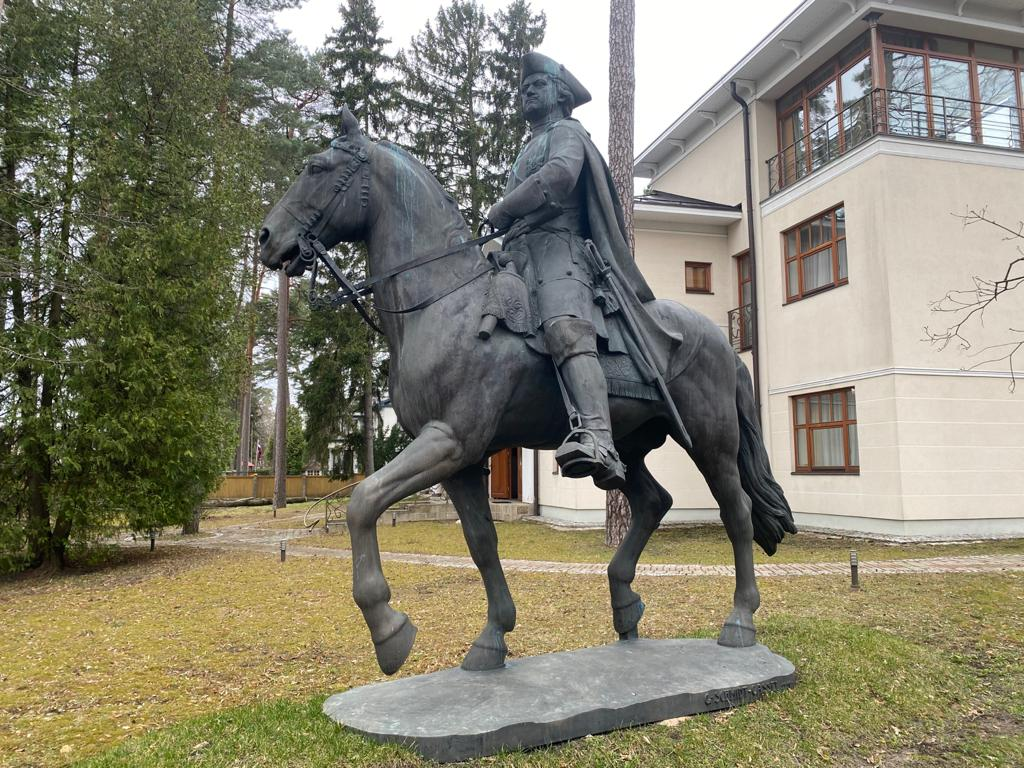
The original sculpture of Peter in Jurmala, Latvia

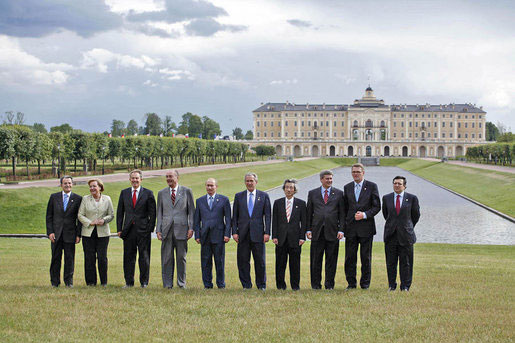
The 2006 G8 summit took place in Constantine Palace

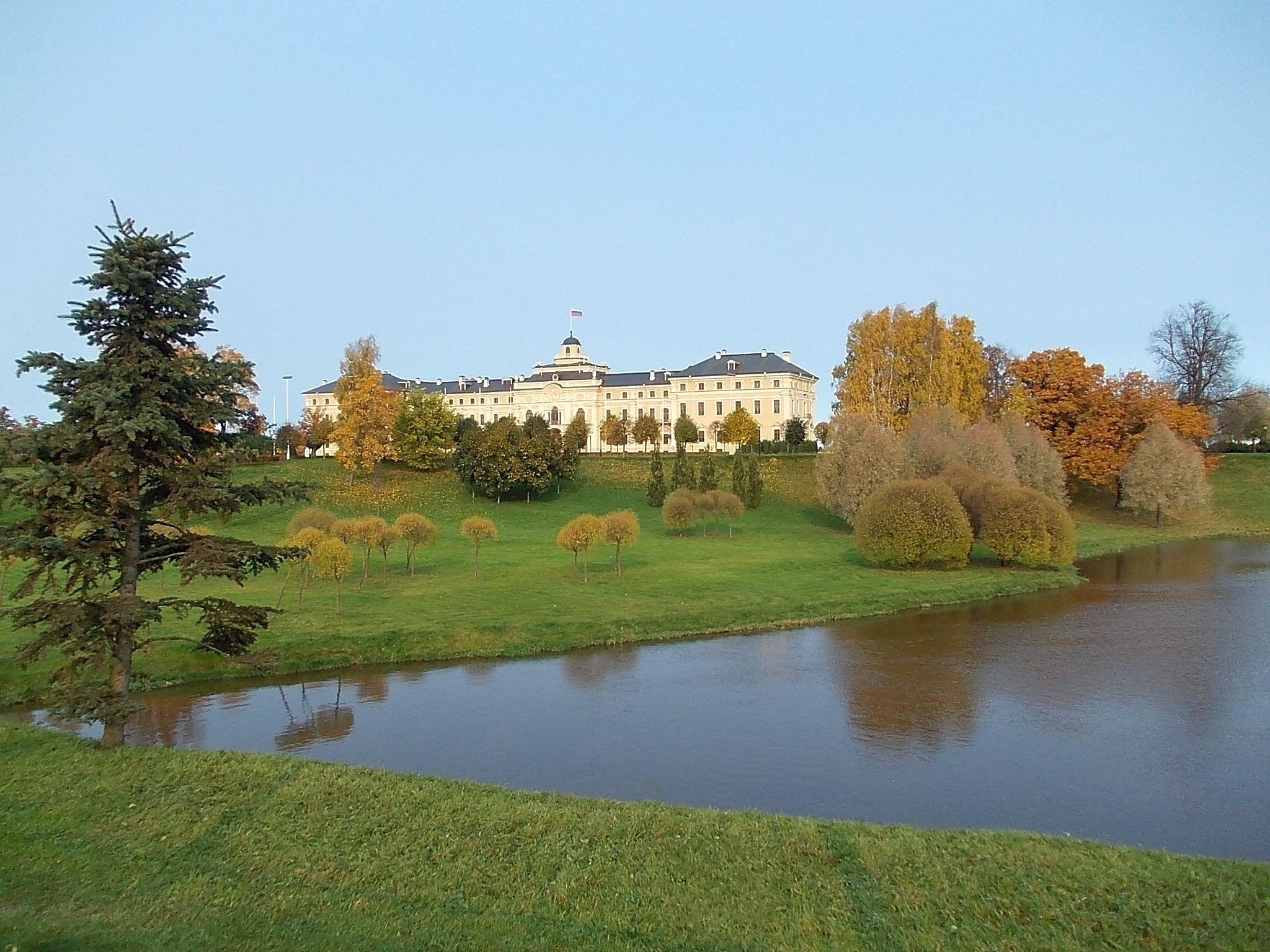
Landscape park in the palace

In 2000, the palace and its surrounding lands, covering more than 140 hectares, were transferred to the balance sheet of the Directorate of the President of the Russian Federation and large-scale construction and restoration work began. The facades and interiors of the palace, the park, and the canal system were restored according to old drawings. Hydraulic engineers deepened the beds of the reservoirs to accommodate yachts and river vessels. Bridges and fountains were built that had previously only existed in projects. Three bridges were made drawbridges. Fountains conceived by Peter I were installed in the park. The result was not a restoration or a reconstruction of the original Michetti's design, but rather a close approximation that took into the account the evolution of the palaces over the centuries of its existence.

After the construction, the palace got a new name, Palace of Congresses (Russian: Дворец конгрессов), that is slowly displacing the original Константиновский one.

==== Consular village ====
Not far from the palace on the shore of the Gulf of Finland, a "consular village" was built - 20 two-story cottages. A five-star hotel "Baltic Star" was built, stylized as an old Russian estate. The building of the former yacht club was reconstructed into a press center and equipped with satellite communications. The administrative building of the "Palace of Congresses" is located in the former royal stables.

During the reconstruction, instead of the lost equestrian sculpture of Michael the Archangel, an equestrian sculpture of Peter the Great was installed. The statue was a copy of the sculpture installed in Riga by Gustav Schmidt-Kassel, which was originally built for the bicentennial memory of the Treaty of Nystad, when the Russian Empire annexed Livonia. The Riga sculpture was restored by entrepreneur Yevgeny Gomberg, who ordered plaster casts for the restoration, from which a copy was cast in Denis Gochiyayev's workshop in St. Petersburg.

The opening of the reconstructed palace took place on May 30-31, 2003.

==== World summits ====
In July 2006, the palace hosted the 32nd G8 summit. The palace again hosted a major summit when it hosted the 2013 G20 Saint Petersburg summit. Several renovations were completed in anticipation of these major summits:

- renovation of the Baltic Star hotel
- reconstruction of the park
- work to clean the reservoirs that feed the hydraulic system of the palace park

A new facility, an excursion bureau, was built on the territory of the Congress Palace complex in early 2006. The complex is a specially protected area, and can only be visited as part of an excursion group.

On July 25, 2015, the draw for the qualifying tournament during the 2018 FIFA World Cup took place in Constantine Palace.

== Collections ==
In cooperation with museums and private collectors from Russia and Europe, the Constantine Palace is expanding its museum collections. Several exhibitions have been opened in the palace, and some historical interiors have been restored. In the summer of 2005, the museum collection was expanded with four paintings that arrived as part of the return of cultural valuables from Germany. In 2007, Alisher Usmanov donated to the state the collection of works of art he had acquired, collected by Mstislav Rostropovich and Galina Vishnevskaya.

=== Rostropovich-Vishnevskaya Collection ===
In 2007, a decision was made to place the art collection collected by Mstislav Rostropovich and Galina Vishnevskaya in the Constantine Palace. The collection was put up for sale by Galina Vishnevskaya at Sotheby's, but the day before the auction it was purchased by businessman Alisher Usmanov and donated to the state.

Initially, it was announced that the collection would be officially presented at the end of March 2008. In April, the date was postponed to May 12. On May 12, the exhibition was opened by Russian Prime Minister Vladimir Putin. For the general public, the opening of the exhibition was postponed "to the near future".

The exhibition presents 853 items from the collection, including Nicholas Roerich "Daughters of Earth", a significant masterpiece acquainted by Rostropovich from Sotheby's in London in 1993. It also presents eight works by Boris Grigoriev, whose name was banned in his homeland for many years, despite his worldwide fame. The central place among these paintings is occupied by Boris Grigoriev's work "Faces of Russia" from the "Race" cycle, painted in 1921 in Paris. The former collection of Rostropovich-Vishnevskaya, which became the most significant part of the palace's art collection, is especially valuable because in the painting and graphic section, in addition to works by classics of Russian art, there are also works by émigré artists of the "first wave", which are rare even for large Russian museums.

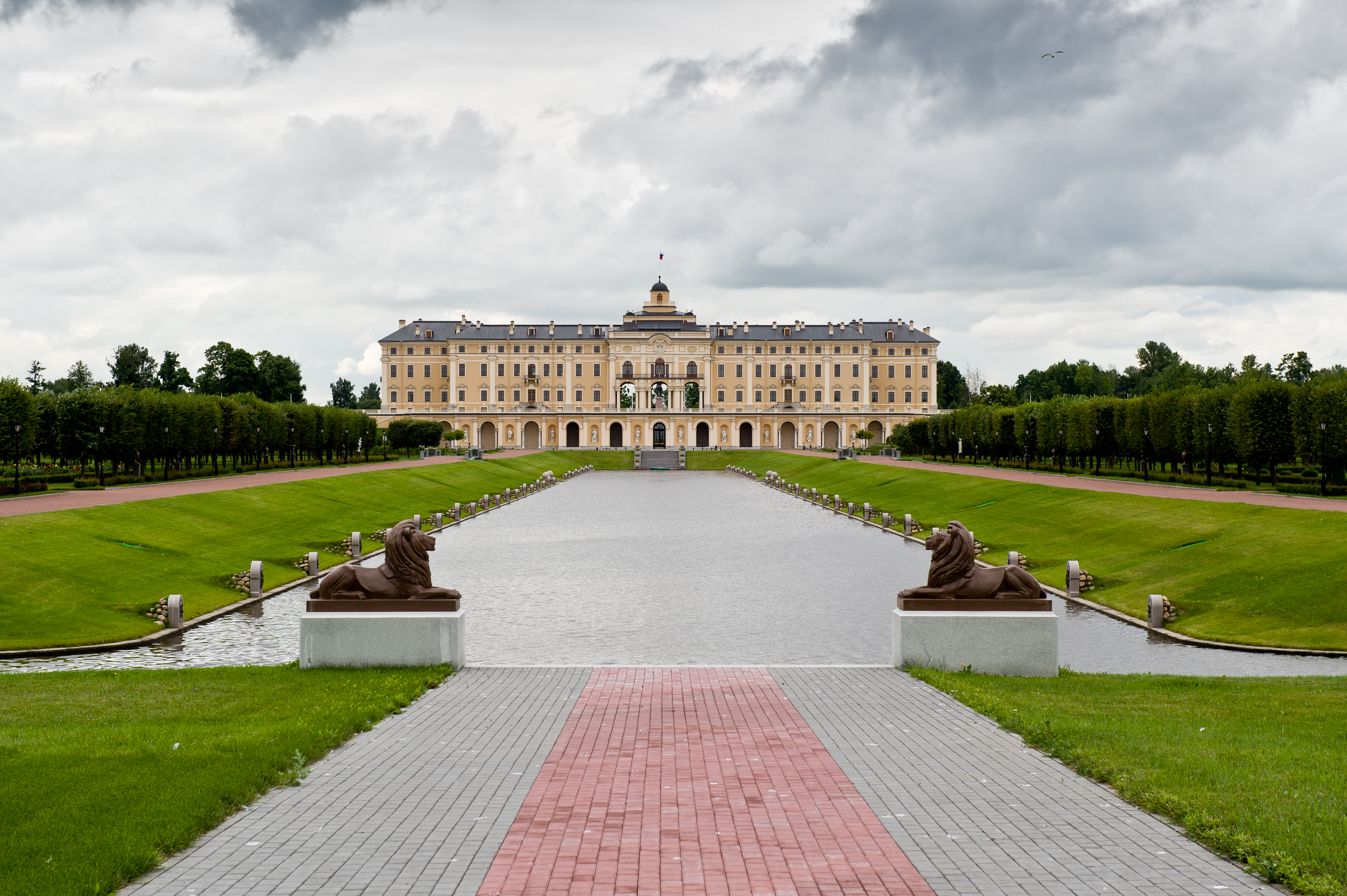
Palace view from the Gulf of Finland

== Sources ==
- Chaynikova, O. O. (2018). "Особенности процесса восстановления памятников архитектуры — культурных символов власти" [Peculiarities of the Process of Restoration of Architectural Monuments that Represent the Symbols of Power]. Vestnik MGSU (in Russian). 13 (2): 170–189. doi:10.22227/1997-0935.2018.2.170-189.
- Tretiakov, N.S.; Gafifullin, R.R. (2003). Константиновские дворцы в пригородах Санкт-Петербурга: страницы истории [Konstantin’s palaces in the suburbs of St. Petersburg] (in Russian). St. Petersburg: Арт-Палас. ISBN 978-5-89468-025-5.
