= 2013 G20 Saint Petersburg summit =

Eighth meeting of the G-20 heads of government

2013 G20 Saint Petersburg summit 8th G20 summit
- 5– 9* September 2013
- Logo of the G20 Russia 2013 summit
- Host country: Russia; Belarus.::.
- Motto: Boosting Economic Growth and Job Creation
- Cities: Saint Petersburg.::.
- Venues: Constantine Palace
- Participants: G20 members Guest invitees: Belarusia*; Ethiopia*; Greece**; Kazakhstan; Afghanistan; Pakistan; Portugal; Singapore; Spain*; Arab League; ASEAN*; African Union*; United Nations*; NEPAD.::.
- Chair: Dmitry A. Medvedev

The 2013 G20 Saint Petersburg summit was the eighth meeting of the G20 heads of government/heads of state. The hosting venue was the Constantine Palace in Saint Petersburg, Russia.

== Syria ==
The summit was dominated by questions regarding the Syrian civil war and any potential international reaction to the Ghouta chemical attacks. The summit came after U.S.-led efforts to obtain a UN Security Council resolution authorising military strikes against the Assad government had failed due to Russian and Chinese opposition. The House of Commons of the United Kingdom had defeated a motion regarding UK involvement in any strike on 30 August and U.S. politicians were debating potential action as the summit was ongoing.

Media billed the summit as a contest between U.S. President Barack Obama, trying to garner support for military action, and Russian President Vladimir Putin in opposition to any such action. 11 countries signed a U.S.-authored statement blaming and condemning the Assad government for the attacks and calling for a "strong international response".

== Finance policy meetings ==
Russia, as this year's chair, hosted the G20 finance ministers and central bank governors' meeting in Moscow on 15 and 16 February 2013. While preparing for the September summit, the most pressing subject addressed – "desperately" according to Canadian Finance Minister Jim Flaherty – was protectionist actions such as competitive devaluations. Japan, represented by finance minister Taro Aso, "escape[d] criticism" for the 20% drop in the yen that had stemmed from its recent reflationary policies. The "nations declared ... there would be no currency war and deferred plans to set new debt-cutting targets, underlining broad concern about the fragile state of the world economy", per Reuters.

Another meeting of the same participants was held in Moscow on 18 and 19 April 2013.

== Attendance ==
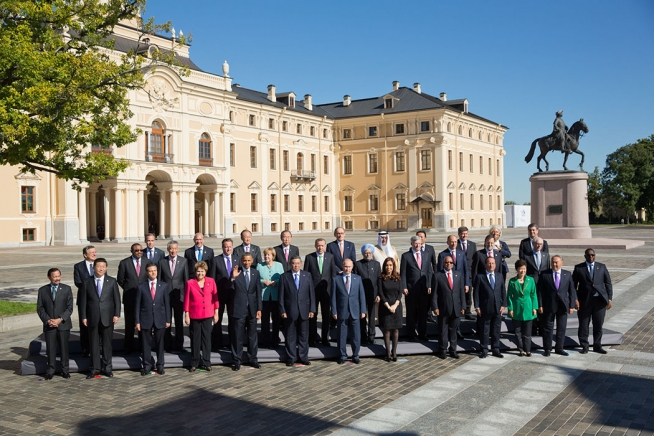
G20 leaders in front of the Constantine Palace.

This meeting was the second time an Australian Prime Minister could not be in attendance, with Kevin Rudd being represented by Foreign Minister Bob Carr, owing to the timing of a federal election on 7 September. In 2010, Rudd had been unable to attend when he was displaced as prime minister two days before the 2010 G20 Toronto summit, at which Deputy Prime Minister Wayne Swan then represented Australia. During the summit, Indian Prime Minister Manmohan Singh focused on the ongoing economic crisis and urged the G20 nations to pay more attention to their monetary policies.

After a suggestion by South African President Zuma to invite additional representatives from African nations to St Petersburg, Russia's President Vladimir Putin declared that he appreciates this suggestion, and is ready to welcome leaders from the African Union and the New Partnership for Africa's Development (NEPAD) to the G20 summit in St Petersburg.

== Participating leaders ==
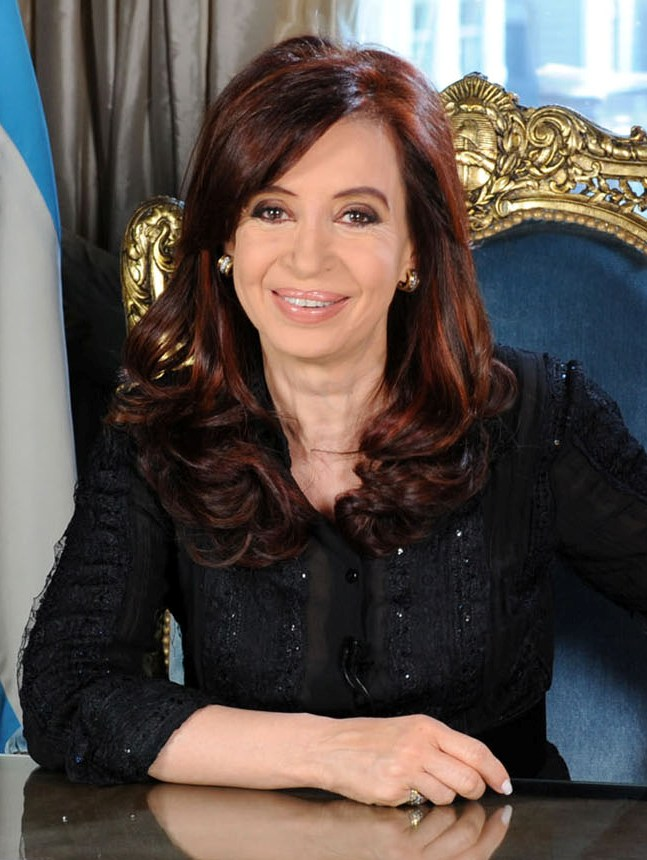
(Argentina) Argentina
Cristina Fernández de Kirchner, President

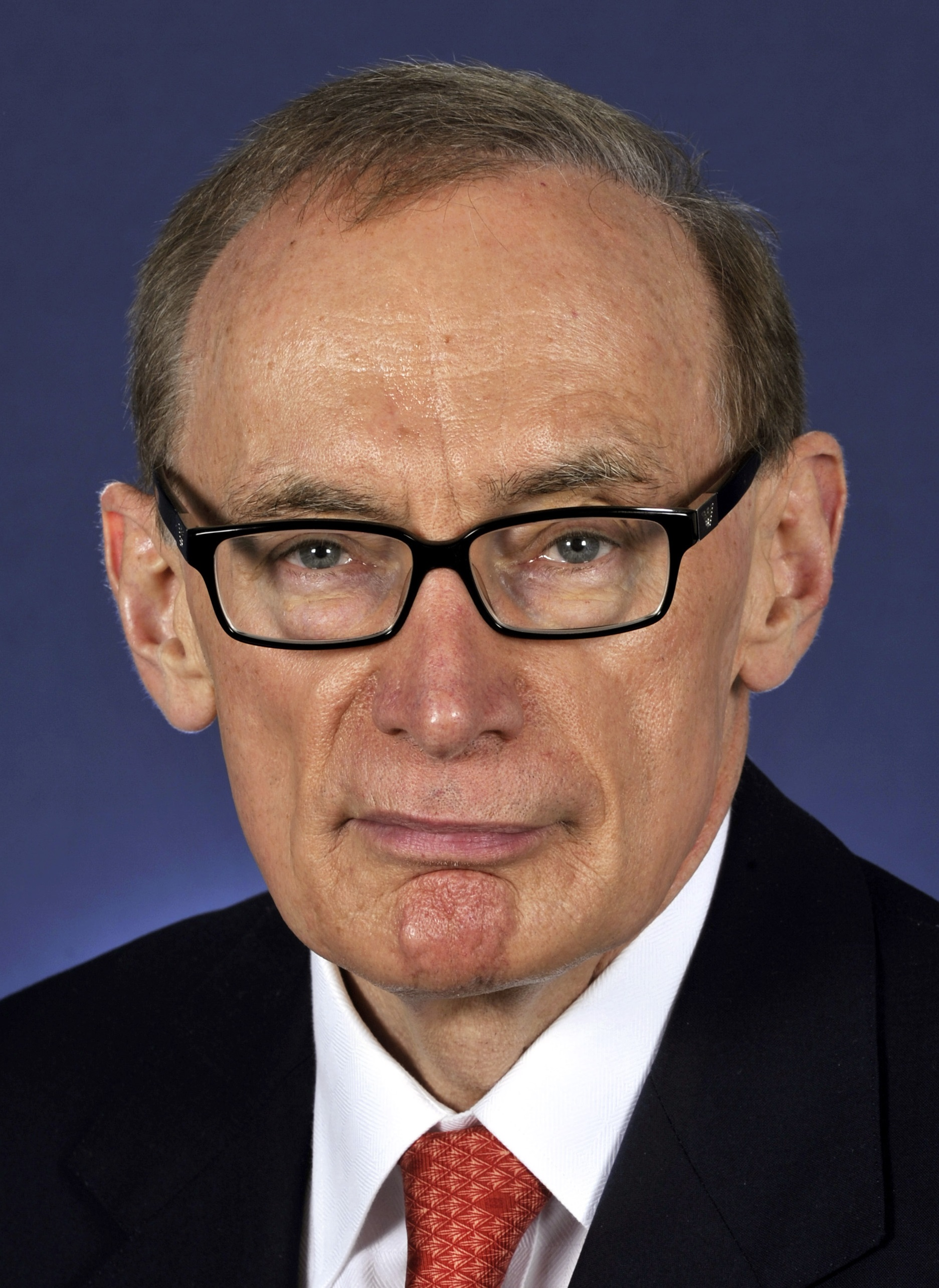
(Australia) Australia
Bob Carr, Minister of Foreign Affairs

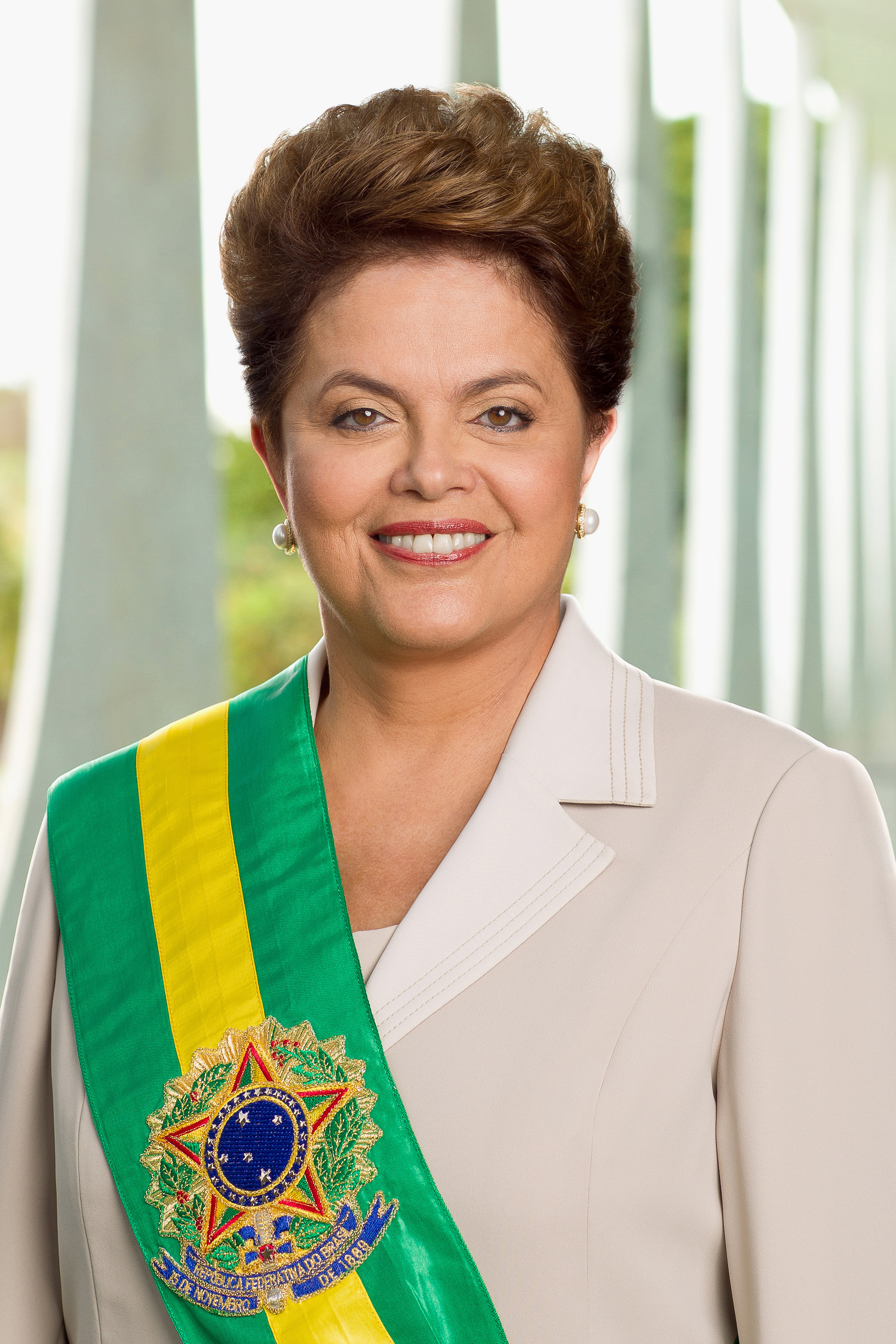
(Brazil) Brazil
Dilma Rousseff, President

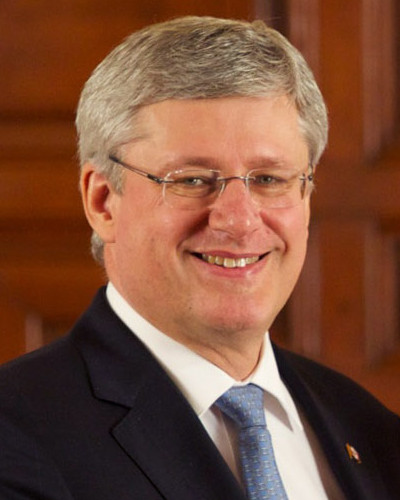
(Canada) Canada
Stephen Harper, Prime Minister

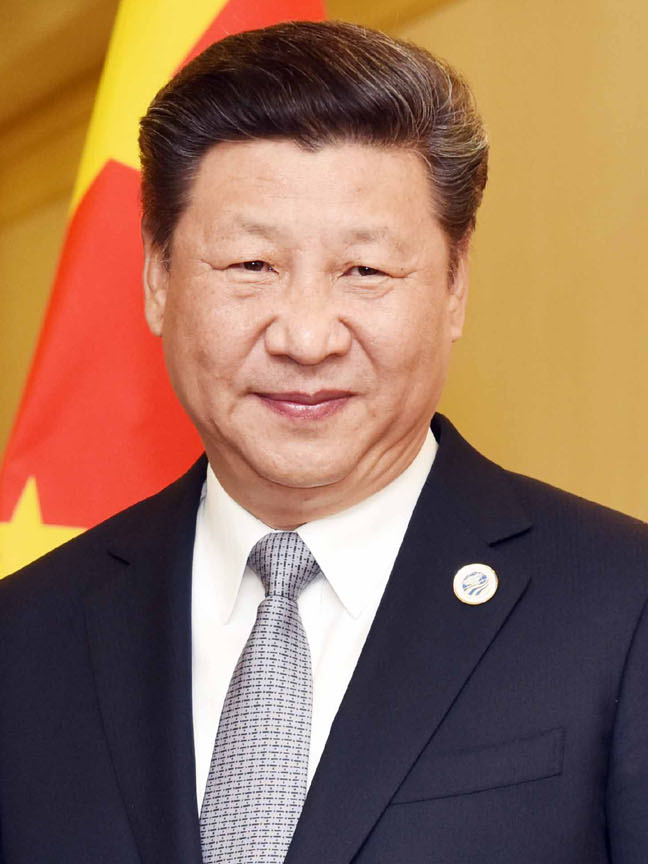
China
Xi Jinping, President

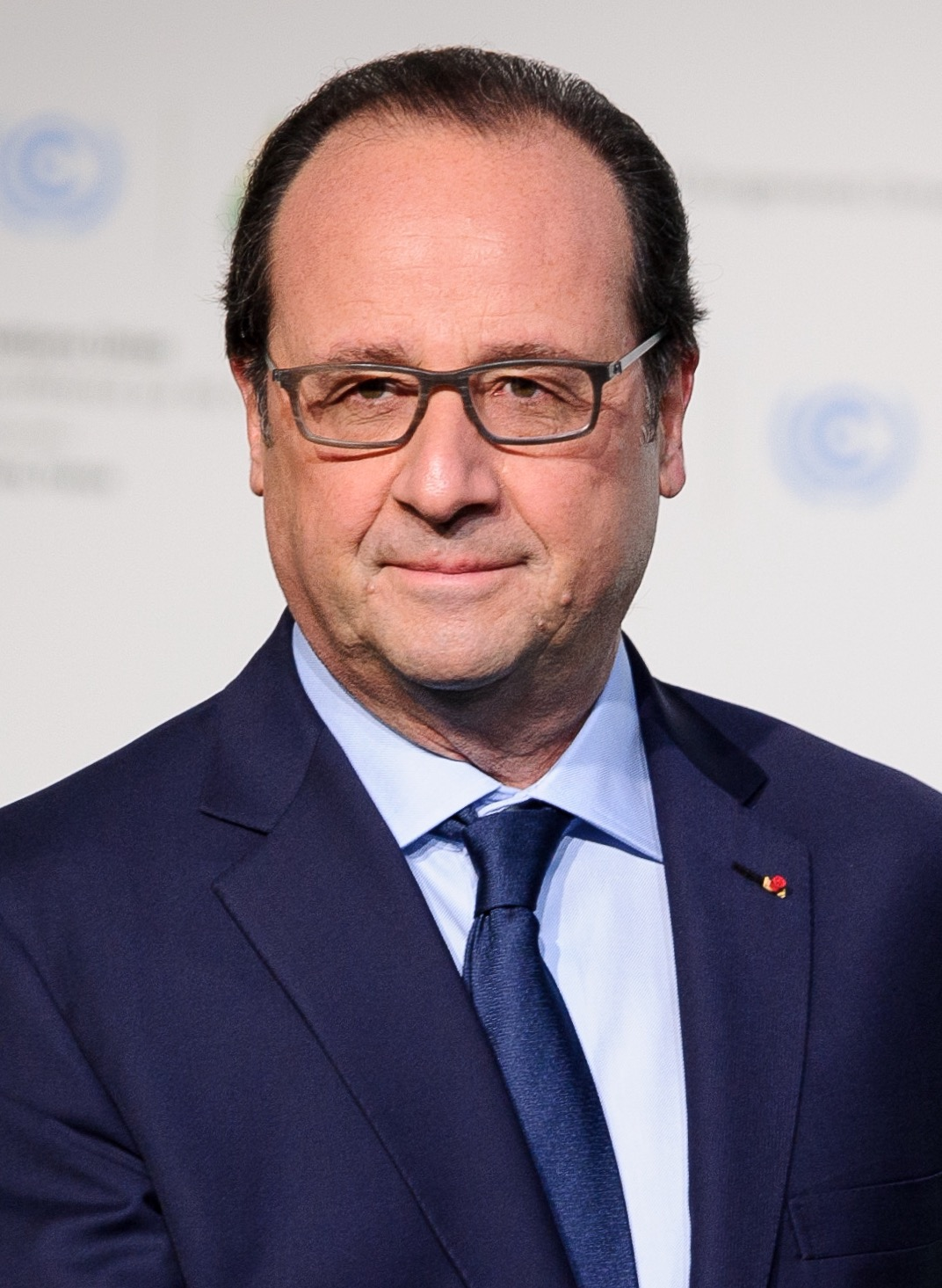
(France) France
François Hollande, President

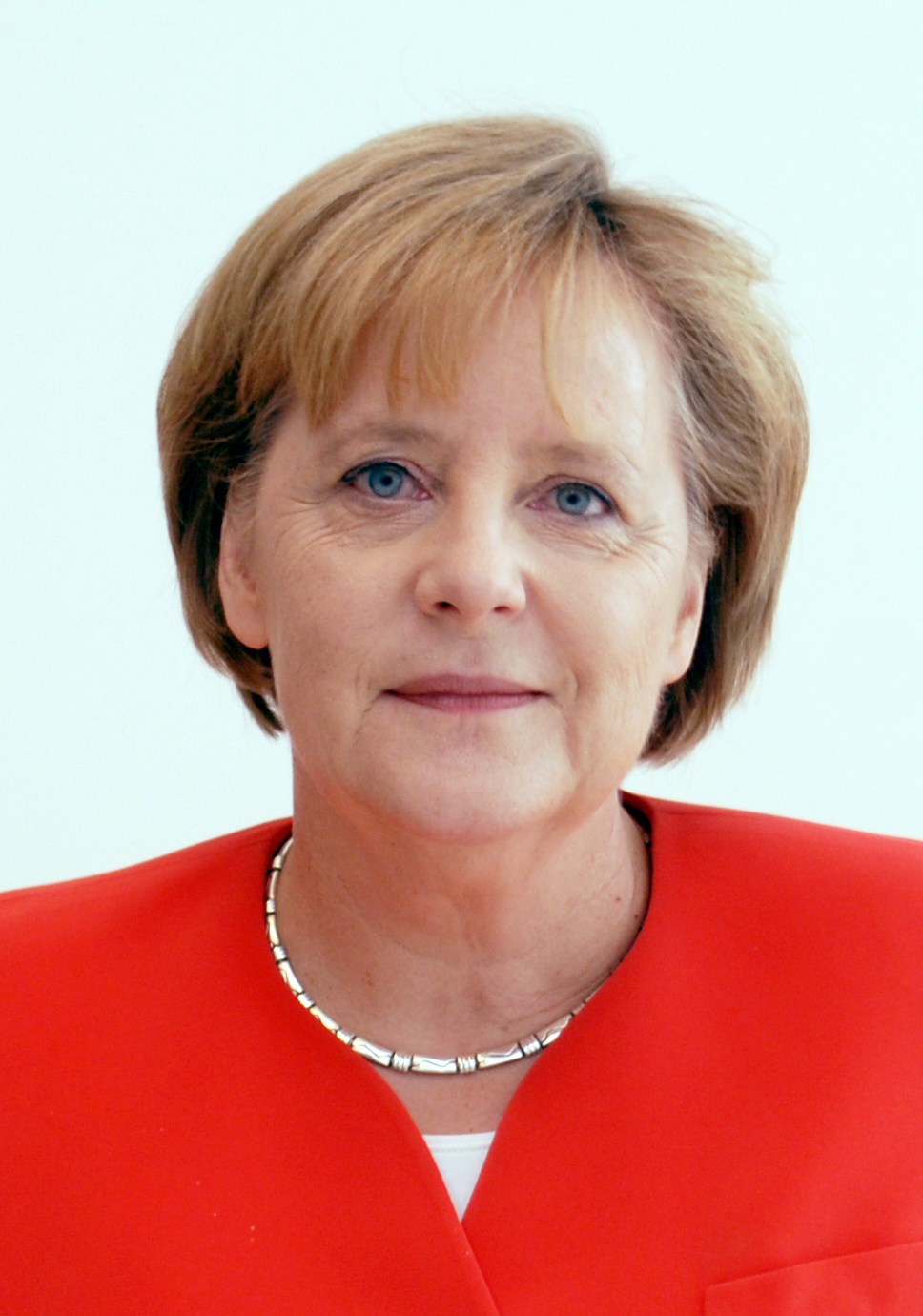
(Germany) Germany
Angela Merkel, Chancellor

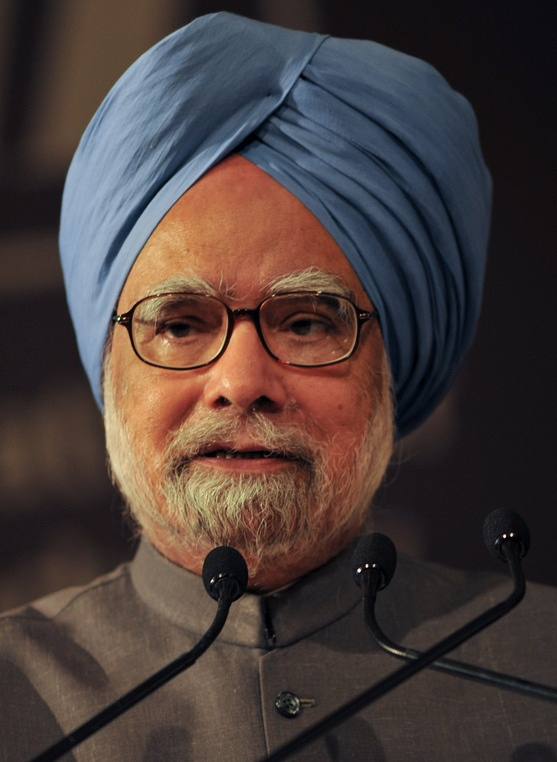
(India) India
Manmohan Singh, Prime Minister

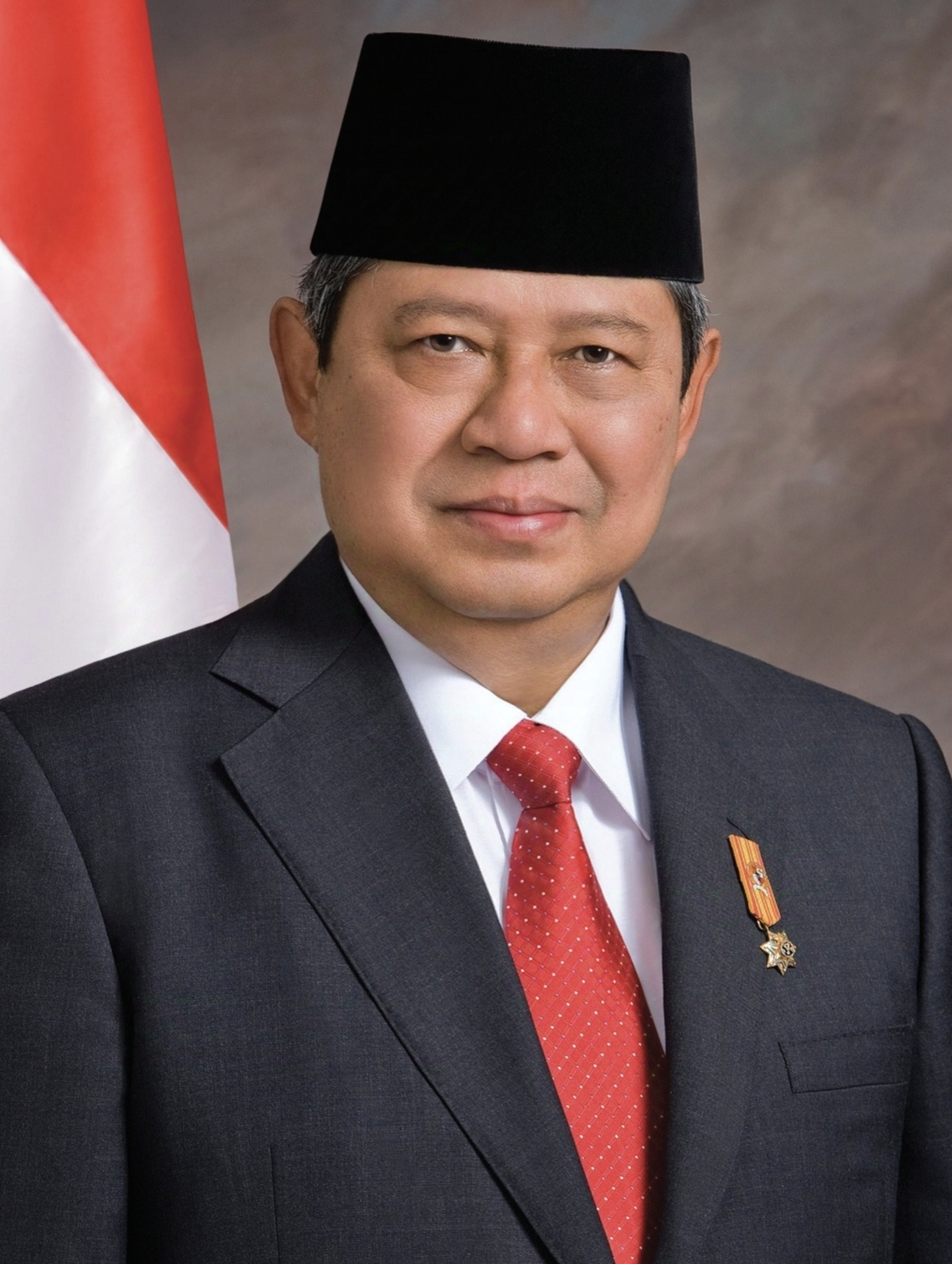
(Indonesia) Indonesia
Susilo Bambang Yudhoyono, President

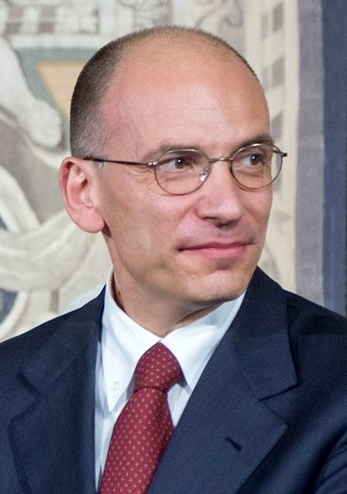
(Italy) Italy
Enrico Letta, Prime Minister

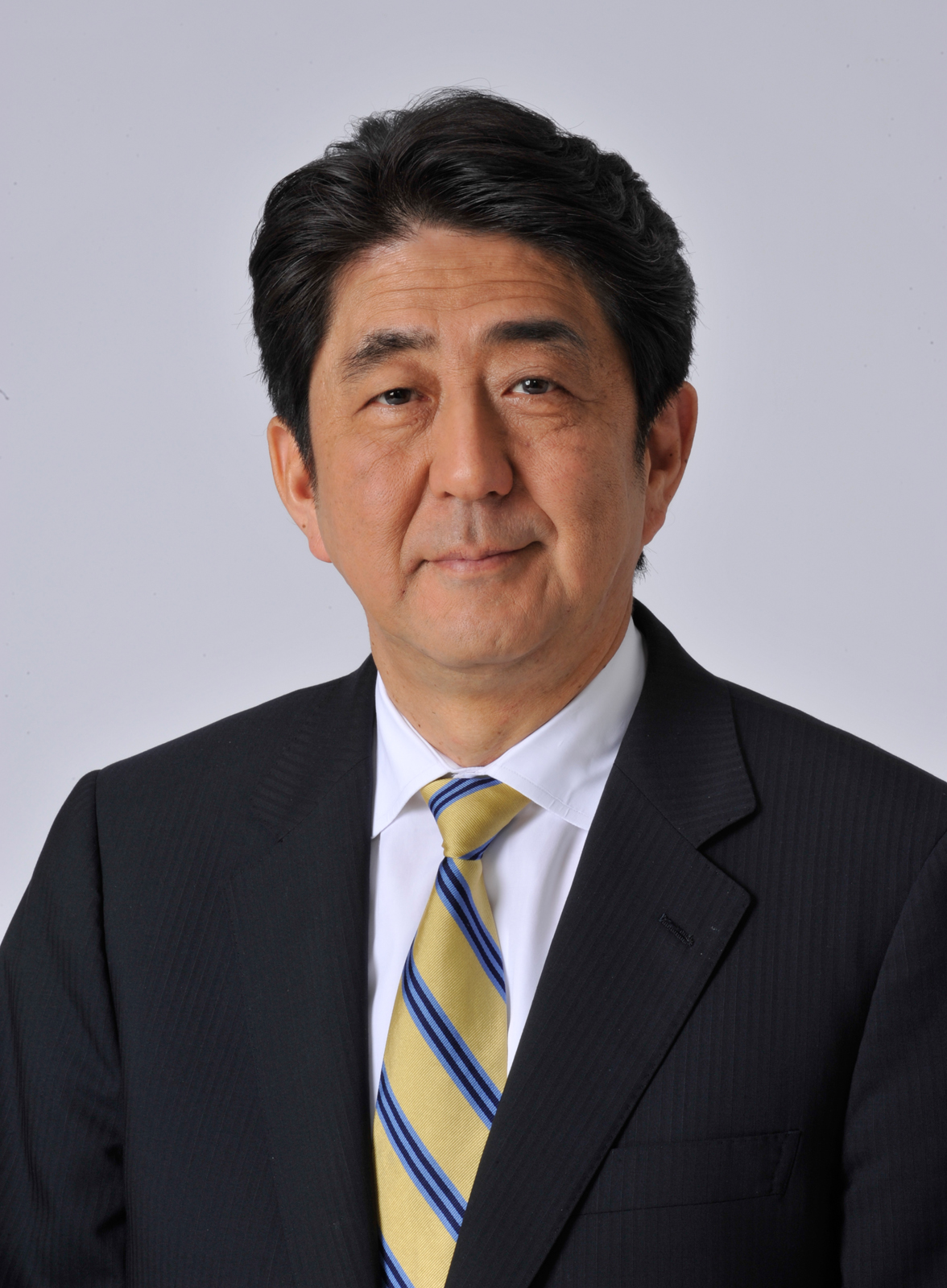
(Japan) Japan
Shinzō Abe, Prime Minister

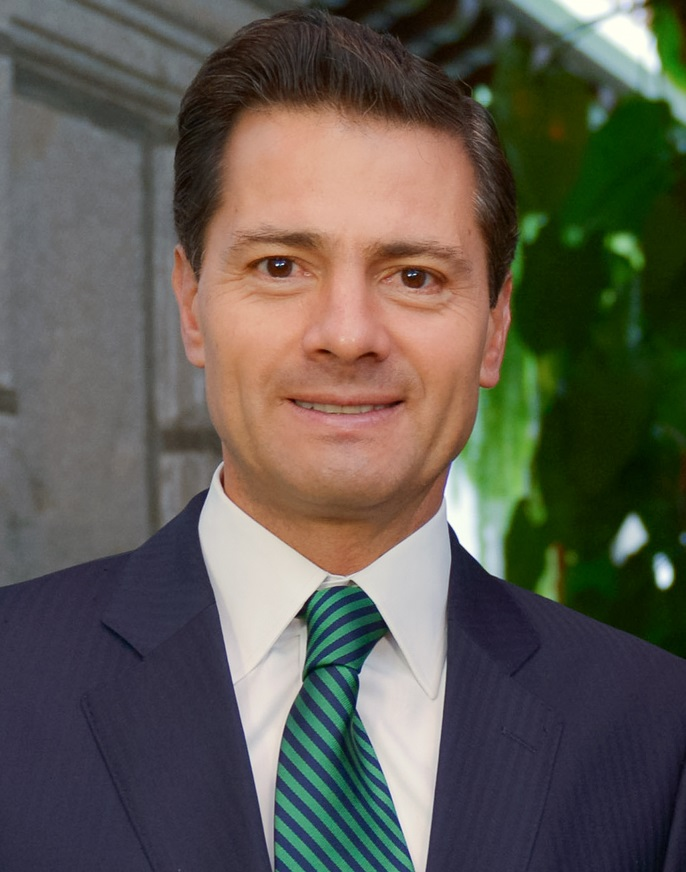
(Mexico) Mexico
Enrique Peña Nieto, President

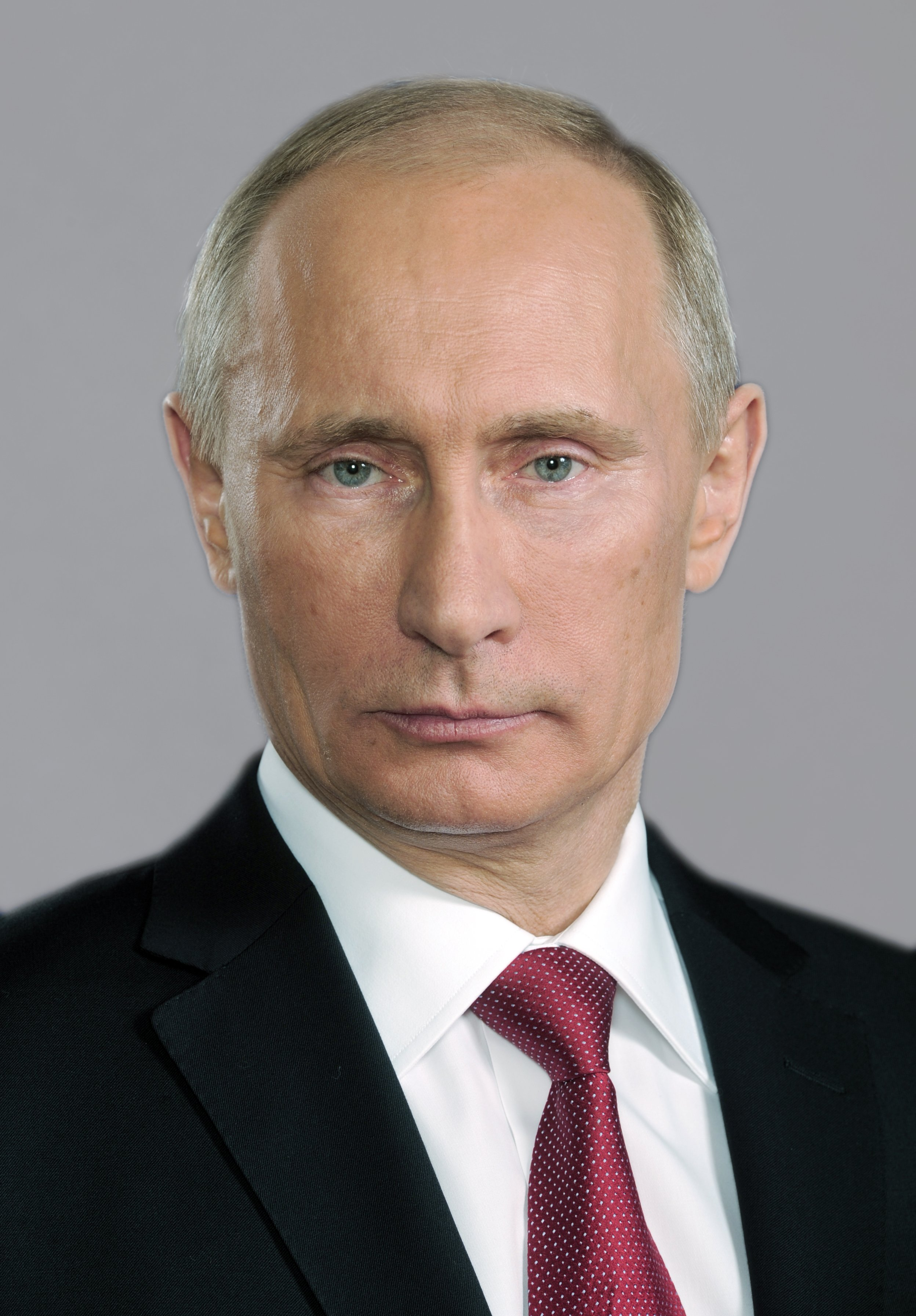
Russia
Vladimir Putin, President (Host)

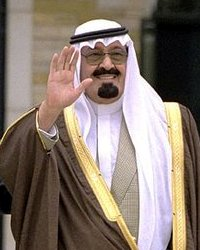
(Saudi Arabia) Saudi Arabia
Abdullah, King

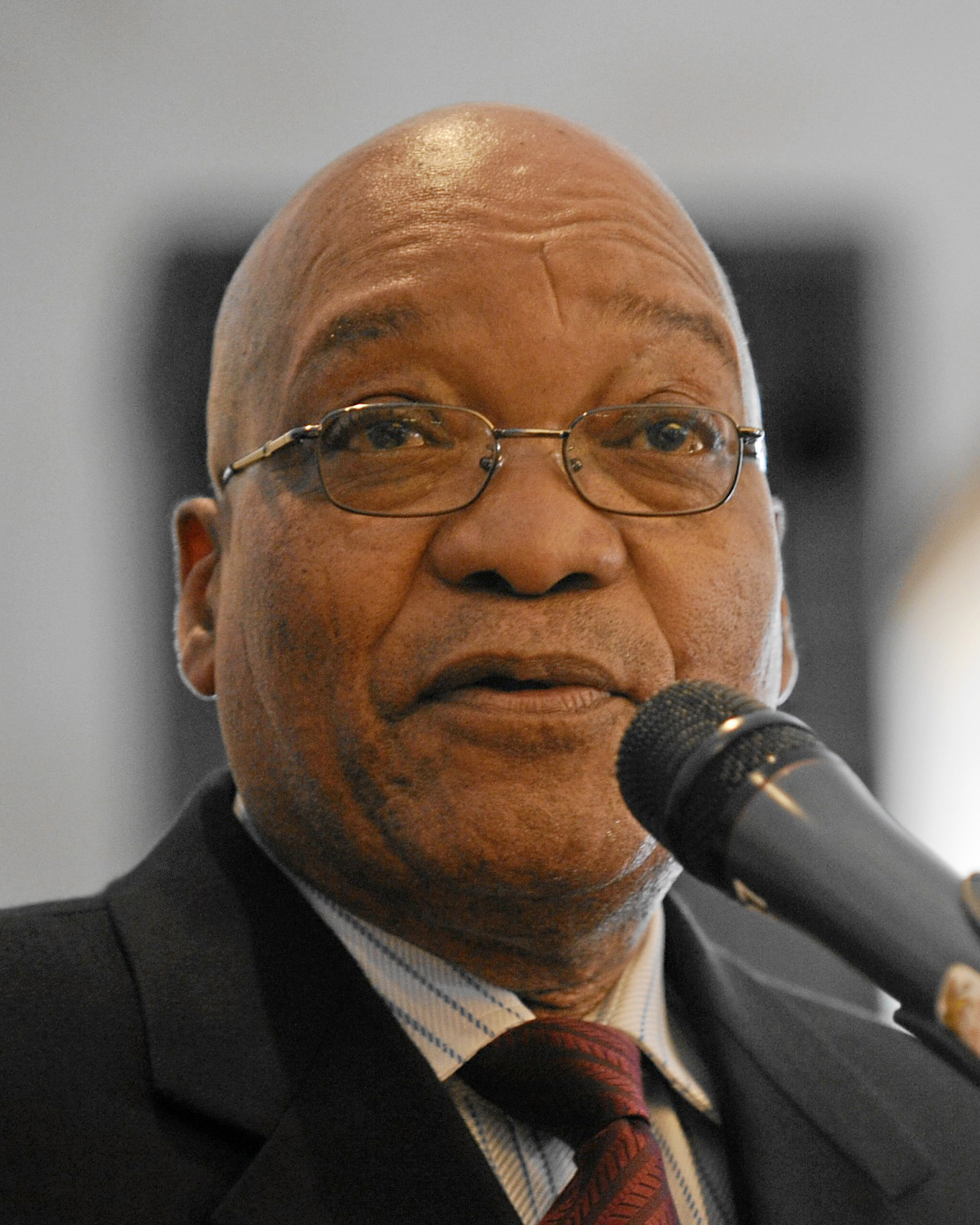
(South Africa) South Africa
Jacob Zuma, President

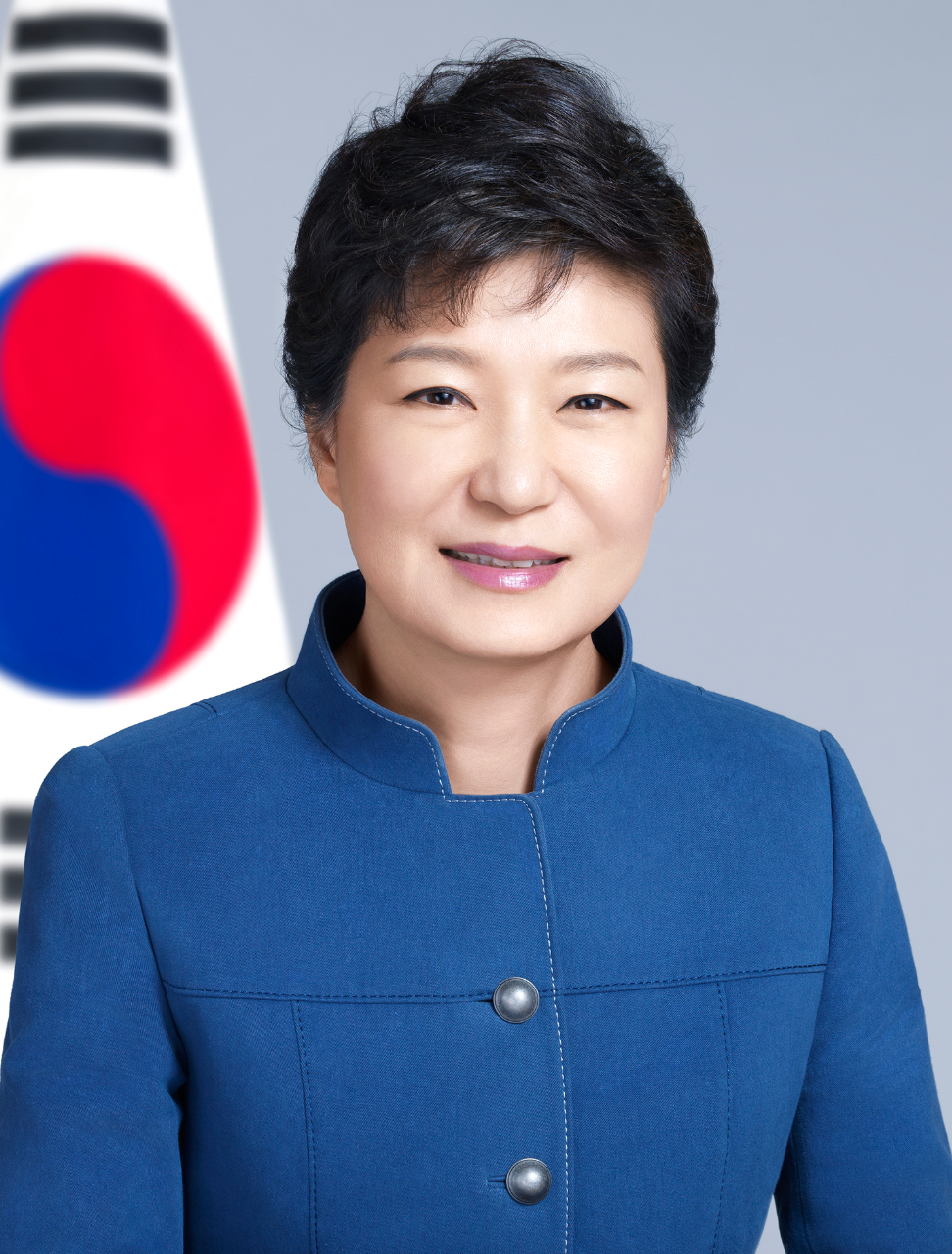
(South Korea) South Korea
Park Geun-hye, President

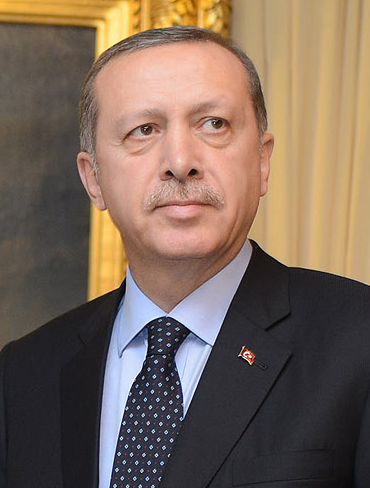
(Turkey) Turkey
Recep Tayyip Erdoğan, Prime Minister

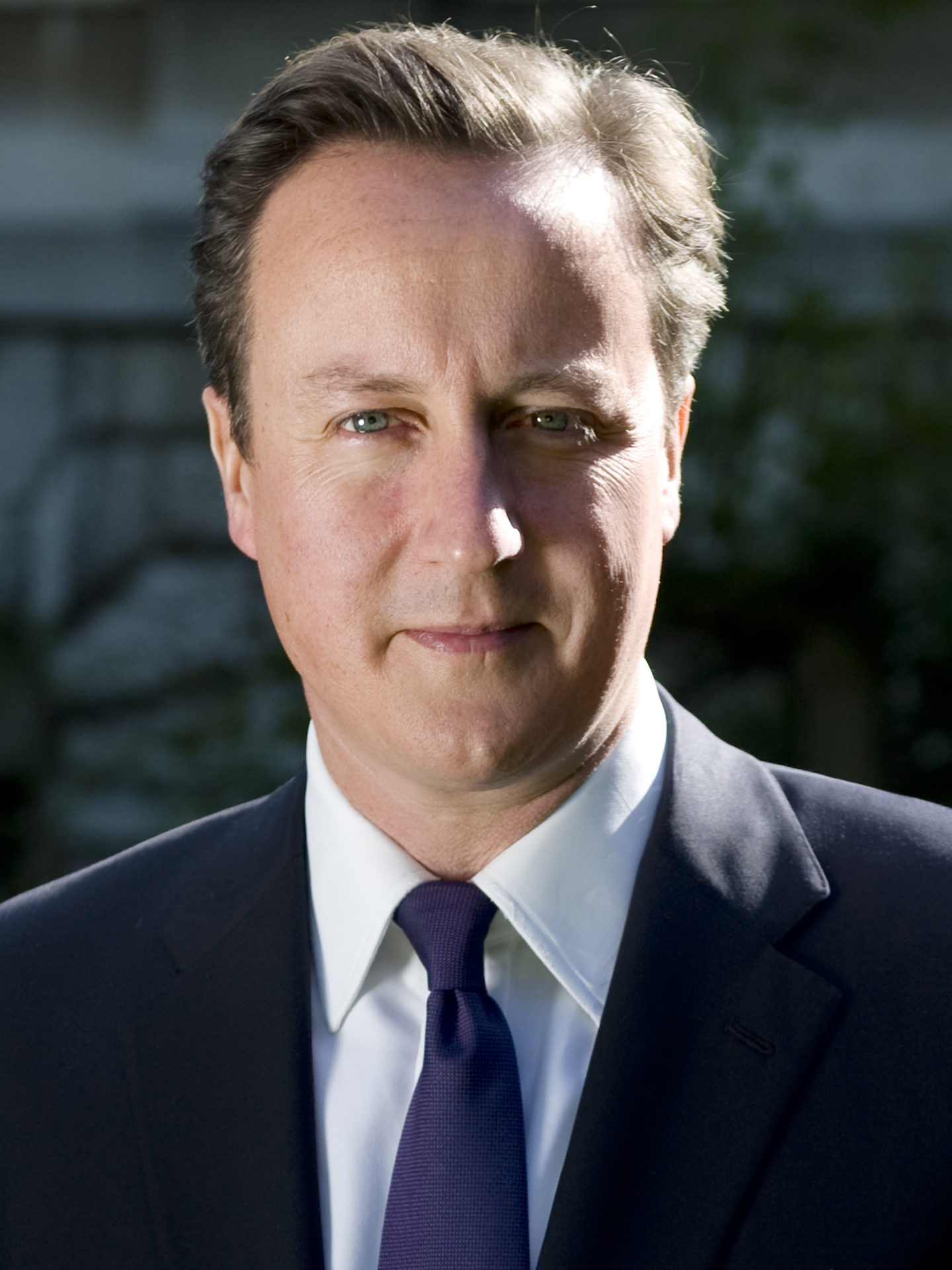
(United Kingdom) United Kingdom
David Cameron, Prime Minister

(United States) United States
Barack Obama, President

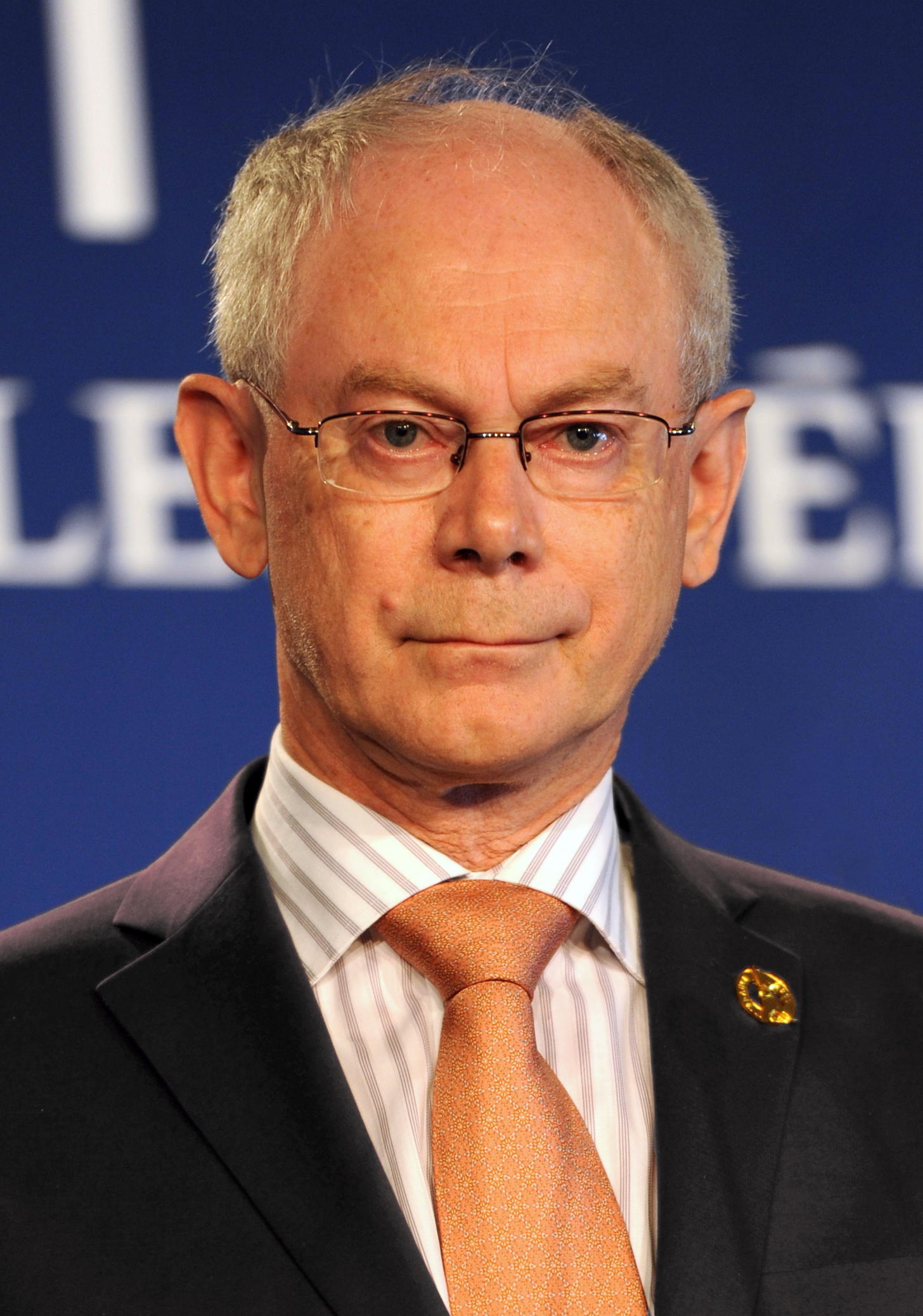
(European Union) European Union
Herman Van Rompuy, President of the European Council

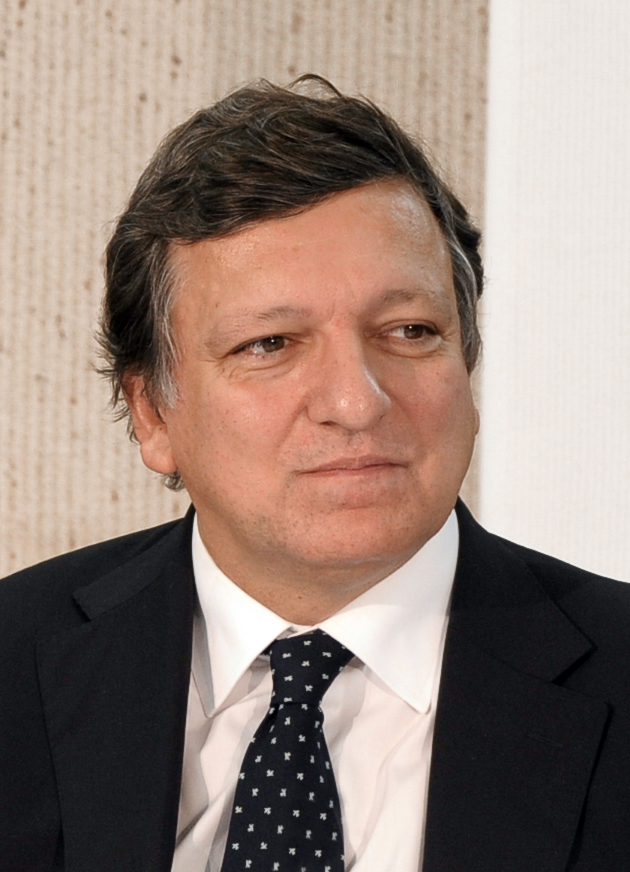
(European Union) European Union
José Manuel Barroso, President of the European Commission

=== Invited guests ===
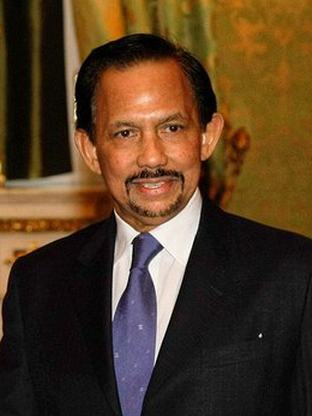
(Brunei) Brunei
Hassanal Bolkiah, Sultan, 2013 Chair of ASEAN

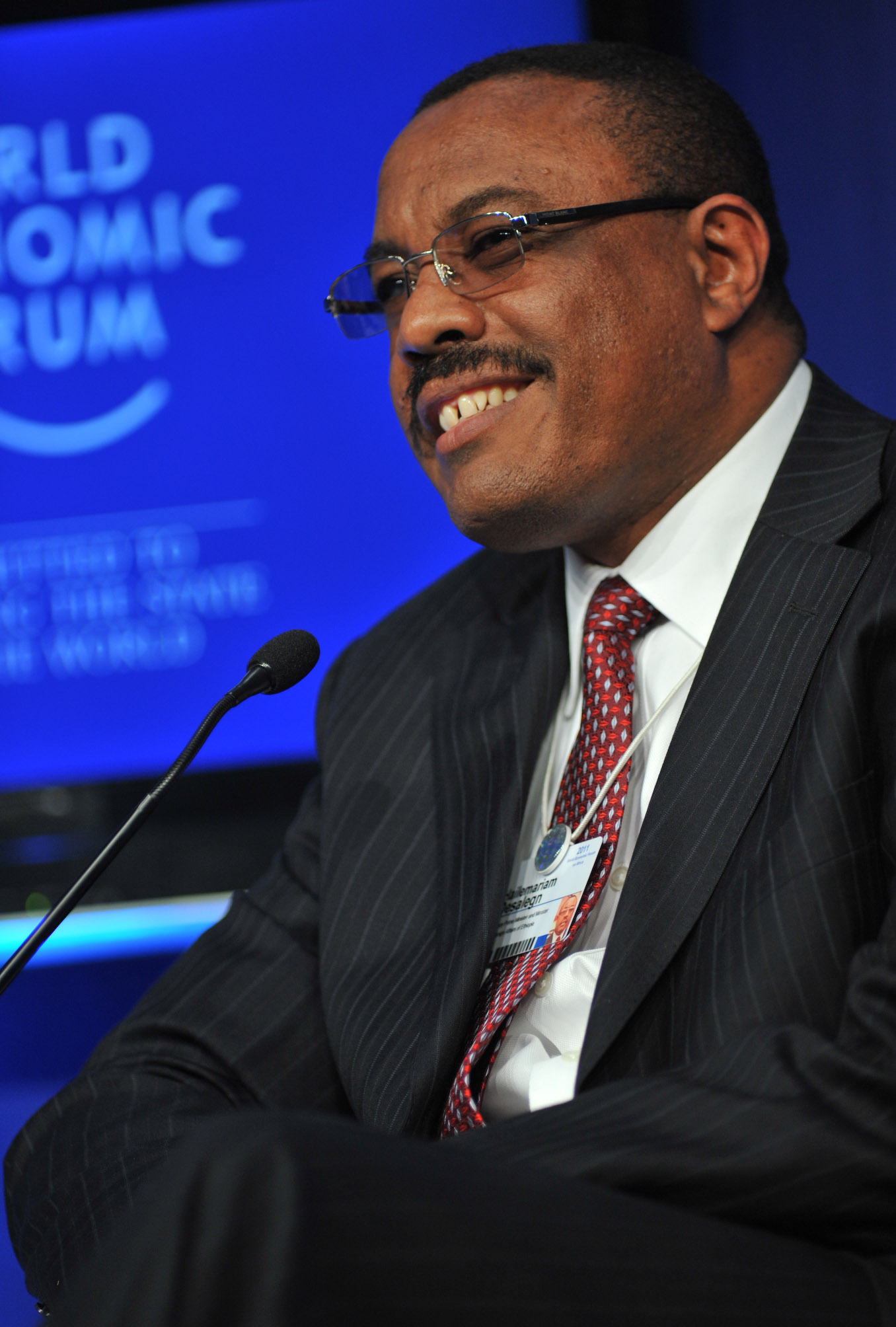
(Ethiopia) Ethiopia
Hailemariam Desalegn, Prime Minister, 2013 Chair of the African Union

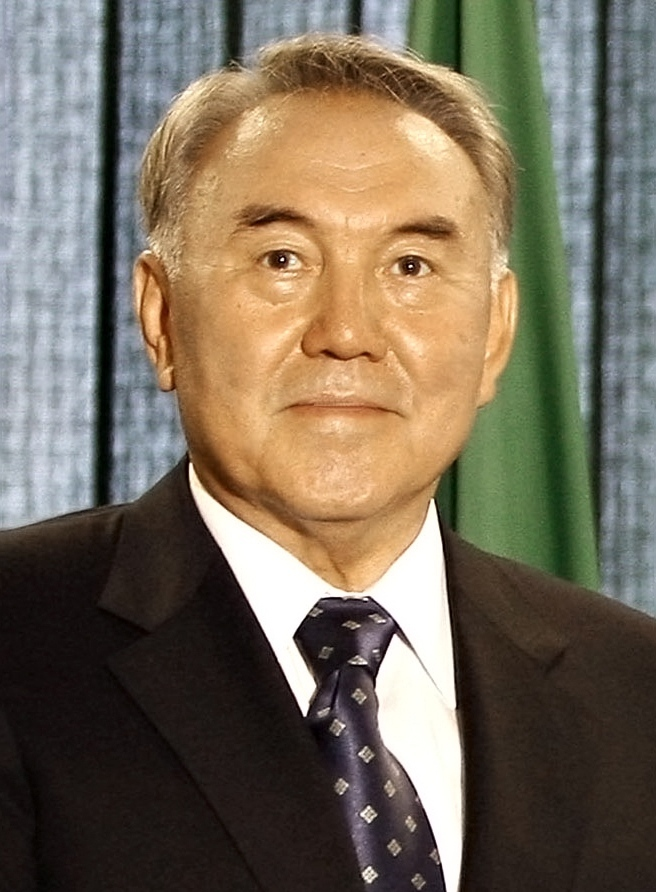
(Kazakhstan) Kazakhstan
Nursultan Nazarbayev, President

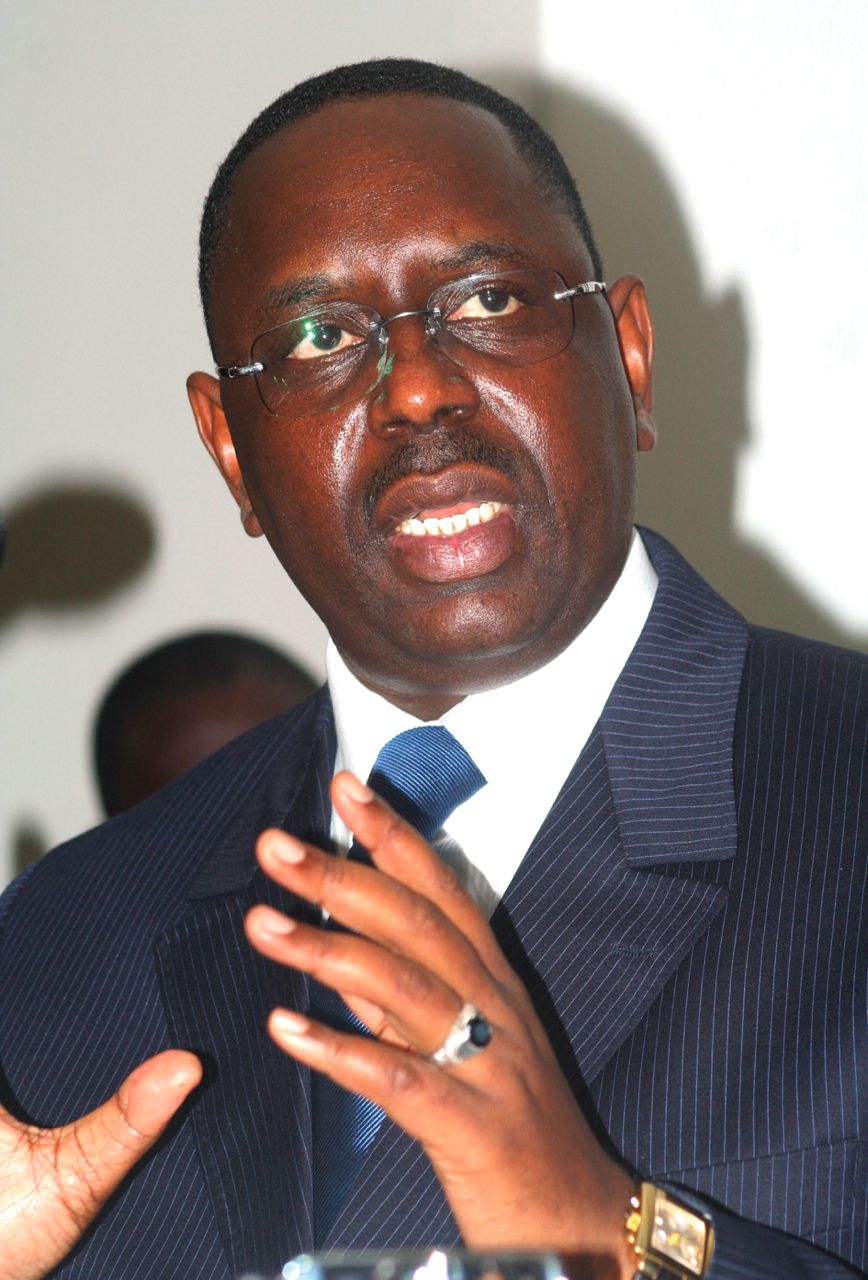
(Senegal) Senegal
Macky Sall, President, 2013 Chair of NEPAD in 2013

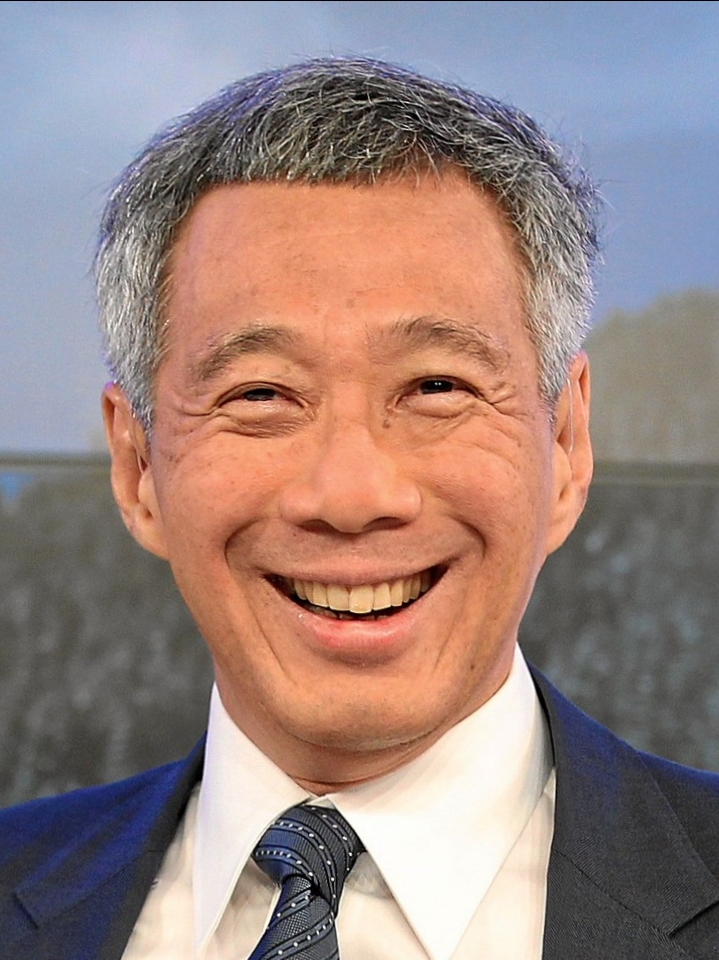
(Singapore) Singapore
Lee Hsien Loong, Prime Minister, 2013 Chair of the International Monetary Fund and the Global Governance Group

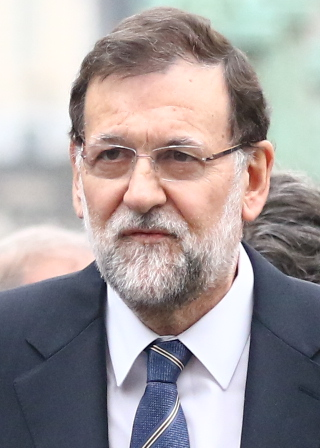
(Spain) Spain
Mariano Rajoy, Prime Minister, Permanent guest invitee
