= Directorate of the President of the Russian Federation =

Russian federal executive body

- Управление делами президента Российской Федерации
- Official emblem

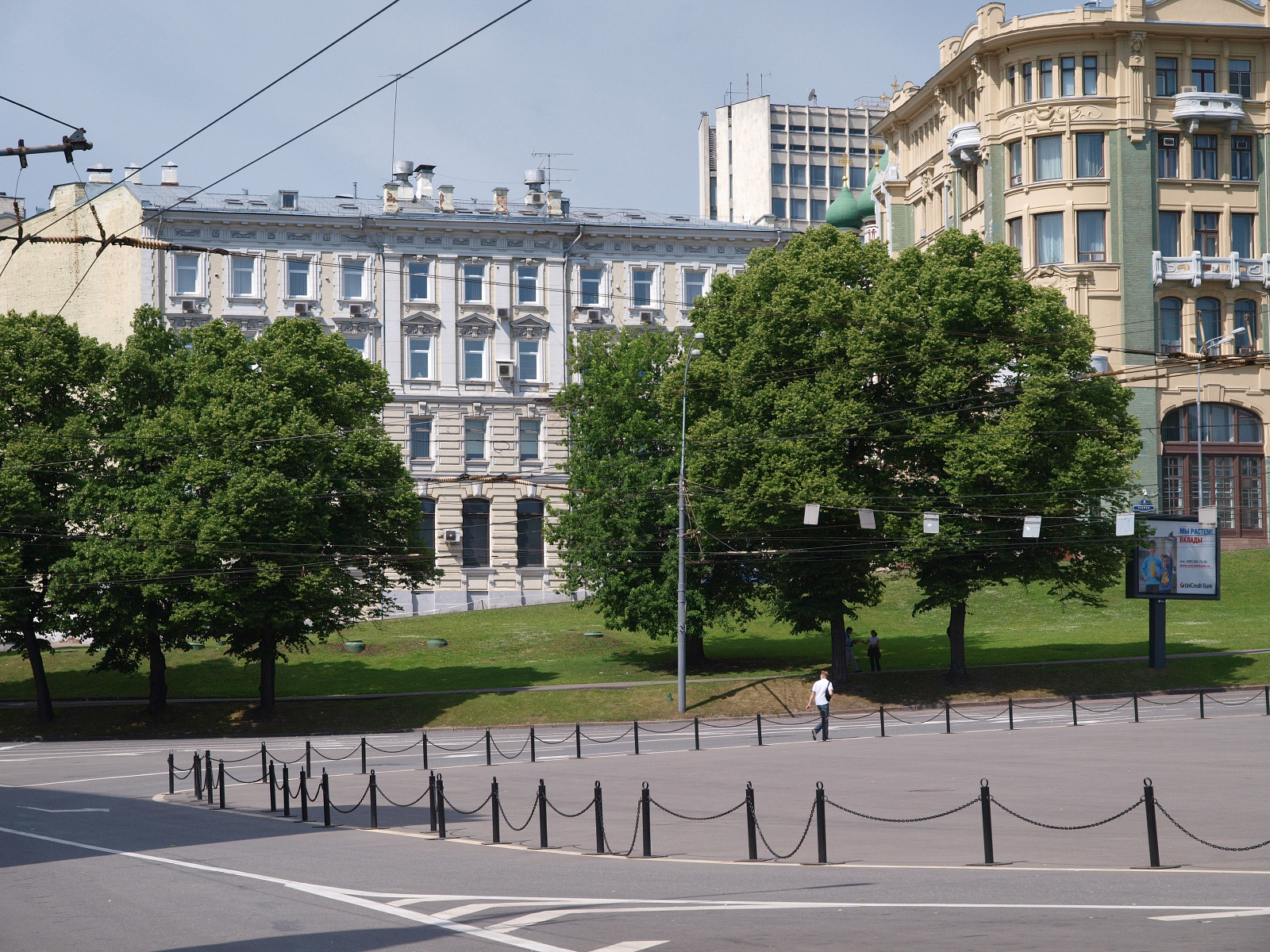

Agency overview
- Formed: 15 November 1993
- Jurisdiction: President of Russia
- Headquarters: 2 Nikitnikov Lane, Moscow
- Website: www.udprf.ru

Directorate of the President of the Russian Federation (Russian: Управление делами президента Российской Федерации (Управделами президента)) is a federal executive body (federal agency) that organizes and directly provides material and technical support and social, medical, and sanatorium and resort services for the activities of federal government bodies. Created on November 15, 1993, by Presidential decree No. 735-rp to replace Main Social and Industrial Administration of the Administration of the President of the Russian Federation (GSPU). Since August 2, 1995, it has the status of a federal executive body and as of 2013 employs 500 workers.

== Overview ==
It is dealing also with business management, organizes and directly implements, in the manner established by the legislation of the Russian Federation, financial support for the activities of the President of the Russian Federation, the Government of the Russian Federation, the Presidential Administration of Russia and the Office of the Government of the Russian Federation. he funds received by the Department of Affairs from the management of its subordinate organizations and from the management and disposal of federal property under its jurisdiction, including property assigned to subordinate organizations, cannot be used to remunerate the staff of the Department of Affairs. The procedure for using these funds is determined by the Department of Affairs in coordination with the Ministry of Finance of the Russian Federation.

Organizations subordinate to the Office of Administration are federal state unitary enterprises and federal state institutions included in the list of federal state unitary enterprises and federal state institutions subordinate to the Office of the President of the Russian Federation, as well as federal property objects, the management and disposal of which are entrusted to the Office of the President of the Russian Federation.

== Structure ==
- Control department
- Audit Department
- Department of Internal Financial Audit
- Procurement Control Department
- Mobilization department
- Main Medical Department
- Department of medical care
- Department of emergency medical care and hospitalization
- Contingent accounting department
- Department of Pharmaceutical and Medical-Technical Activities
- Department of organizing spa care and marketing
- Department of Innovation and Modern Medical Technologies
- General Directorate of Housing and Social Services
- Department of hotel complexes and halls of officials and delegations
- Contract Division
- Housing department
- Department of consumer services and subordinate organizations
- General Directorate of Capital Construction
- Construction Preparation Department
- Technical department
- Planning department
- Department of Targeted Programs
- General Directorate for International Cooperation
- Department of Foreign Property and International Cooperation
- Department of Protocol Events and Delegation Services
- General Directorate of Catering
- Event and Food Service Department
- Department of Agriculture and Trade
- General Directorate of Federal Property
